= Benjamin Verdery =

American musician and composer

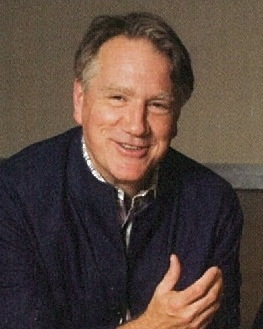
- Verdery in 2005
- Born: 1955 (age 70–71); Danbury, Connecticut, United States
- Education: SUNY Purchase
- Known for: Guitar, composing, teaching
- Style: Classical, contemporary
- Spouse: Rie Schmidt
- Website: Benjamin Verdery

Benjamin Verdery (born 1955) is an American classical guitarist, composer and teacher. Verdery has performed at venues including Carnegie Hall, Concertgebouw (Amsterdam), Lincoln Center, the Metropolitan Opera, and Wigmore Hall (London). He has played and recorded with a wide range of classical and other musicians, including guitarists William Coulter, Leo Kottke, Paco Peña, Andy Summers and John Williams, vocalist Hermann Prey, composer Anthony Newman, and his wife, flutist Rie Schmidt. New York Times classical music critic Allan Kozinn described Verdery as "one of the guitar’s grand individualists" and "an iconoclastic player," known as much for his devotion to new music and transcriptions of Jimi Hendrix songs as for inventive interpretations of Bach. As of 2021, Verdery had released 19 albums and been featured on several others. He has taught at the Yale School of Music since 1985.

== Early life and education ==
Benjamin Verdery was born in 1955 in Danbury, Connecticut, to John Duane Verdery, an Episcopalian minister and headmaster of the Wooster School, and Suzanne Aldrich Verdery. He became interested in music after hearing The Beatles' "I Saw Her Standing There" in 1963.

In his senior year at Wooster School, Verdery began formal lessons with classical guitarist Phillip De Fremery. After learning four pieces in order to audition for conservatory, he was accepted at SUNY Purchase in 1974, where he studied with composer-organist Anthony Newman and guitarist-composer Frederic Hand, and earned the school's first BFA in guitar in 1978. During that time, he also took master classes with the classical guitarist-composers Leo Brouwer and Alirio Díaz; since then he has studied with pianist-composer Seymour Bernstein. While at SUNY, Verdery met flutist Rie Schmidt (who later co-founded Flute Force); together they formed the Schmidt/Verdery Duo and married in 1979. Since debuting in New York City at Merkin Hall in 1980, they have released two albums and continue to perform.

== Music ==
Early in his career, Verdery was recognized in magazines such as Classical Guitar, Guitar Player and Billboard among "a new breed of classical guitarists" and "advocates of new guitar music" stretching the instrument through inventive transcriptions, new compositions, and diverse influences, performance contexts and programs. In Verdery's case, writers cited an open-mindedness and lack of affectation that allowed him to synthesize tonal nuances, techniques and expressive sensibilities from rock, blues, jazz and other influences, including Aretha Franklin, Jimi Hendrix, Dinu Lipatti, Julian Bream, David Oistrakh, Bill Connors, John Williams, John McLaughlin, Miles Davis, and others.

While the earliest part of Verdery's career centered on the classical repertoire, by the late-1980s he looked towards more contemporary material, mixing Anthony Newman, Lou Harrison and Steve Reich compositions alongside Jimi Hendrix tunes in recitals, which stood him apart from most classical guitarists. In the 2000s, he continued to integrate old, new and more diverse works into his programs, blurring boundaries between genres. In 2020, Acoustic Guitar's Mark Small wrote, "Among the virtuosi of the Baby Boomer generation, it's not hard to make a case that Verdery has explored the most diverse terrain," noting a recorded repertoire that includes Bach, Strauss and Mozart, adventurous contemporary classical composers (including himself), arrangements of Prince, traditional folk tunes and hymns, Eastern influences and "all manner of guitars."

=== Performing ===
Verdery has performed internationally, at venues including the Chamber Music Society of Lincoln Center, Concertgebouw, the Metropolitan Opera, Wigmore Hall, and guitar festivals around the world. He has played with guitarists William Coulter, Frederic Hand, Leo Kottke, Paco Peña, Nano Stern and John Williams, and vocalist Jessye Norman, among others. In 1996, Verdery accompanied the German baritone Hermann Prey in a performance of Schubert's "Fruhlingsglaube" described in the New York Times as bringing "an affecting sweetness and intimacy to [the] gently lyrical music." In 2005, Verdery and Andy Summers debuted Ingram Marshall's "Dark Florescence Variations for Two Guitars and Orchestra" at Carnegie Hall with the American Composers Orchestra; Classical Guitar wrote that the performance's modern sensibility "exult[ed] in a dazzling interplay" between classical and electric guitars and orchestra.

Throughout his career, Verdery's recitals have been noted for lyricism, invention, complexity, dynamism and eclecticism. The New York Times review of his 1980 New York debut described his interpretations of Bach as "rhythmically secure and musically precise" with a riveting concentration augmented by "flamboyant gestures." In 1991, Guitar Extra characterized his approach as a "dichotomous marriage of absolute virtuosic bravura and a commanding—and sometimes comedic—stage presence." His later performances have been described as open, democratic and original, freely mixing styles and elements such as altered guitars and digital delay to create new sonic environments.

=== Composing ===
Verdery has composed works for classical and non-classical guitar for solo and duo performance, guitar quartets, chamber groups and orchestras, for himself and others, including Sérgio and Odair Assad, David Russell, David Tanenbaum, Scott Tennant, and John Williams and John Etheridge. After beginning with classical arrangements in the 1980s, he started—without formal training—to compose works for himself, such as the three-movement solo "In Memory," the largely solo and duo pieces comprising his album Some Towns and Cities (1991), "Eleven Etudes," and the Dalai Lama-dedicated "Be Kind All the Time."

Verdery's compositions for larger guitar ensembles include: "Scenes from Ellis Island" (1999), a version of which (titled "Ellis Island") was written for and recorded by the Los Angeles Guitar Quartet; "Pick and Roll" (for multiple guitars, saxophone, violin and basketball player), which premiered at Santa Cruz Contemporary Festival in 2000; and "Give" (for eight guitars), commissioned by Thomas Offermann and premiered in Rostock, Germany in 2009. He has also written chamber music for his group Ufonia and for a work commissioned by the New Jersey Chamber Music Society, titled "Soul Force" (1996, for guitar, cello, flute and percussion). The piece's title lifts a frequently used Martin Luther King term, while the score is based on one of his speeches, with the cello loosely imitating the rhythms of his voice and the guitar imitating its pitch. Verdery's compositions and arrangements are published by Alfred Music and Doberman-Yppan (Canada).

Several composers have written for Verdery, including Daniel Asia, Sérgio Assad, Martin Bresnick, Elizabeth Brown, Frederic Hand, Aaron Kernis, Ezra Laderman, Hannah Lash, David Leisner, John Anthony Lennon, Ingram Marshall, Anthony Newman, Roberto Sierra, Jack Vees, and his former student Bryce Dessner, of The National.

=== Recordings and videos ===
As a recording artist, Verdery has released albums of original and arranged material, of his own, in collaborative duos with guitarists and other instrumentalists, and as a member of Latitude and the ensemble Ufonia. Verdery's early recordings focused on classical works; his first was "Variations and Grand Contrapunctus" (1978), a sweeping piece written for him by Anthony Newman. His first two albums, Bach: Transcriptions for Guitar (1983) and Two Generations of Bach (1985), were noted for their fluent, intuitive playing and modern arrangements; Guitar's John W. Duarte described the former as "intensely musical, expressive but not archaically romantic, splendidly embellished, breathtaking in its sureness and cleanness in even the fastest passages."

With two 1991 recordings, Verdery turned to contemporary American music. Ride the Wind Horse (1991) featured a title piece by Newman, works by Lou Harrison, David Leisner and Roberto Sierra, arrangements of Hendrix's Little Wing and Purple Haze, and Verdery's own first recorded compositions. Los Angeles Times critic John Henken called the album "an important recording distinguished by fluent, evocative playing of strong, characterful repertory." Some Towns and Cities featured fifteen original Verdery compositions inspired by American cities, seen in terms of guitar—the product of Verdery's travels as a performer in the Affiliate Artist Program to factories, hospitals, schools and prisons, as well as concert halls. Reviews described the album as "strikingly American" and groundbreaking, with touches of blues, jazz, Spanish/Mexican and fingerpicking styles and evocative onomatopoeic references. Named Guitar Player's 1992 Best Classical Guitar Recording, it included duets with Fred Hand, Leo Kottke, Paco Peña, John Williams and Rie Schmidt, as well as chamber music selections.

Verdery released three solo guitar albums in the 2000s. Soepa (2002) included an original, arrangements of four Prince songs, and works by composers Daniel Asia, John Anthony Lennon, Ingram Marshall, Van Stiefel and Jack Vees—each present at their piece's recording. Start Now (2005) integrated classical sounds, alternate tunings and electronic effects, as well as African, Indian, flamenco and American popular music elements, including the whimsical "Fix the Funk," the evocative character studies of "Eleven Etudes," and the experimental "Be Kind All the Time." Verdery's Branches (2006) was praised for its transcriptions of Bach, Mozart and Strauss, three Hendrix songs and "Amazing Grace"; Classical Guitar described its approach in the latter four as "collage-like"—with fragments and quoted motives developed to fill in for lyrics that nonetheless maintained each work's harmonic language.

In 2016, Verdery released On Vineyard Sound, an album of originals written by Yale School of Music composition faculty that he performed on solo guitar and in duets. San Francisco Chronicle writer Joshua Kosman described Scenes from Ellis Island (2020) as a playful and ambitious five-work set showcasing Verdery as a solo and collaborative composer and multifaceted performer. The album included the gospel-inflected guitar duet "What He Said"; "From Aristotle", a work combining classical guitar, beatbox rhythms by Marc Martin imitating nature and singing, and spoken-word from the philosopher's Poetics; and the atmospheric title track, featuring overdubbed guitars, cello, and African vocal improvisations.

In 2014, Verdery began releasing music videos with prerecorded audio that were filmed in locations matching the moods of the pieces—many filmed and edited by his daughter, Mitsuko Clarke Verdery. His initial "Shangri La Series" (three videos) was filmed at the Shangri La Museum of Islamic Art, Culture & Design outside Honolulu, Hawaii. As of 2021, Verdery had released 34 videos, containing repertoire such as Bach's Chaconne and Britten's Nocturnal. In 2021, during the COVID-19 pandemic, Verdery and the New York City Classical Guitar Society presented "Peace Love and Guitars," a two-part benefit event premiering sixteen videos featuring him and a number of other artists.

==== Duo and ensemble recordings ====
Verdery has recorded three album collaborations with other guitarists. In 2001, he and steel-string guitarist William Coulter released Songs for Our Ancestors, a wide-ranging album of traditional and ethnic melodies, including Irish jigs, an Africa mbira tune, a Tibetan chant and a Shaker melody; their second, Happy Here (2011), featured originals, traditional Irish and classical works, and rock songs. In 2007, Verdery and Andy Summers released First You Build a Cloud, an album of largely joint compositions, many based on improvisations, as well as a Bach "Sarabande" and a version of the Police song "Bring On the Night." Reviews noted the album for its variety of moods, stringed instruments (including a ukulele) and textures, often Verdery playing classical over Summer's sonic landscapes (e.g., "Flow").

The Schmidt/Verdery Duo have released two albums. Reverie (1986) features flute/guitar arrangements of French, largely Baroque works that Allan Kozinn wrote, were "played with charm, color, character and zest." The Enchanted Dawn (1998) offered a more varied global repertoire with works by Biberian, Hand, Janáček, Michio Miyagi, Piazzolla and Shankar. In the later 1980s, Verdery released three new-age collaborations with Craig Peyton as Latitude: Latitude, 40° North, and Emotional Velocity; in 1988, their song "40 degrees North" reached #1 on the Radio & Records National Airplay chart. Verdery also recorded in the ensemble, Ufonia—with Vicki Bodner (oboe), John Marshall (percussion), Harvie S. (bass) and Keith Underwood (flute)—releasing a self-titled EP (1994) and album (2002); they primarily feature his own compositions of guitar-directed chamber music borrowing from world cultures and employing rich sonic textures. In 2016, Verdery collaborated with rapper Billy Dean Thomas, creating four videos, including Black Bach and Hoochie Coochie Man.

== Teaching and other professional activities ==
Verdery has been a guitar professor at the Yale School of Music since 1985. He has also taught at New York University, Manhattan School of Music, Wisconsin Conservatory of Music, Centro Flamenco Paco Peña (Spain), and his own annual summer master class on Maui, Hawaii. His teaching philosophy balances technique, interpretation and performance, while also emphasizing curiosity, intuition, and the physical relationship to the instrument, including posture and breathing. Verdery's instructional work includes the videotape, The Essentials of Classical Guitar Vol. 1: Sound and Sensation (1989), and the book, Easy Classical Guitar Recital (1999). He was the artistic director of 92nd Street Y’s Art of the Guitar series from 2007 to 2020 and served as artistic director of the D'Addario Foundation for the Performing Arts.

== Discography ==
=== Soloist works ===
- Bach: Two Generations - Concertos For Guitar & Chamber Orchestra, Musical Heritage Society (1983)
- Ride The Wind Horse - American Guitar Music, Newport Classic/Sony Classical (1991)
- Bach: Transcriptions for Guitar, GRI Music (1994); (originally Sine Qua Non, 1983)
- Soepa - American Guitar Music, Mushkatweek Records (2001)
- Branches, Mushkatweek Records (2006)
- The Ben Verdery Guitar Project—On Vineyard Sound, Elm City Records (2016)

=== Original composition works ===
- Some Towns & Cities, featuring duos with Frederic Hand, Leo Kottke, Paco Peña and John Williams, Newport Classic/Sony Classical (1991)
- Ufonia, EP, with Vicki Bodner, John Marshall, Harvie S. and Keith Underwood, Mushkatweek Records (1994)
- Ufonia, with Vicki Bodner, John Marshall, Harvie S. and Keith Underwood, Mushkatweek Records (2002)
- Start Now, Mushkatweek Records (2006)
- Scenes from Ellis Island, New Focus Recordings (2020)

=== Duo collaborations ===
- Reverie – French Music For Flute & Guitar , with Rie Schmidt (as Schmidt/Verdery Duo), Newport Classic/Sony Classical (1986)
- Latitude, with Craig Peyton, Earth Flight Productions (1986)
- Latitude 40 North, with Craig Peyton, Earth Flight Productions (1987)
- Emotional Velocity, with Craig Peyton, Sonia Gaia Productions (1989)
- The Enchanted Dawn, with Rie Schmidt (as Schmidt/Verdery Duo), GRI Music (1998)
- Song for Our Ancestors, with William Coulter, Solid Air (2002)
- First You Build a Cloud, with Andy Summers, R.A.R.E. Records (2007)
- Happy Here, with William Coulter, Mushkatweek Records (2011)

=== As featured player ===
- Legends of the Classical Guitar, Rhino (1991)
- John Williams Plays Vivaldi Concertos, Sony Classics (1991)
- The Romantic Handel, Helicon Classics (1996)
- A Celtic Christmas, Windham Hill (1998)
- The Mask, New World Records (1998)
- Bassoon Brasileiro, MSR Classics (2004)
- A Guitar for Elvis, Solid Air (2010)
- "Atlantis," on Mirage (Elizabeth Brown), New World Records (2013)
