= UT New Music Ensemble =

The UT New Music Ensemble is a contemporary chamber music group based at the University of Texas at Austin Butler School of Music (College of Fine Arts). The group has been led by Professor Dan Welcher since 1979.

Featuring solo, chamber and large ensemble works by living composers and those of the recent past, UTNME presents six full-length concerts annually of new chamber music composed primarily within the past 20 years. This group consists of a sixteen-member core ensemble made up of student instrumentalists and singers at the Butler School of Music.

Since the inception of the Visiting Composers Series in 1995, the ensemble has featured works of four to six world-class guest composers every year; recent guest composers have included Samuel Adler, Claude Baker, William Bolcom, Susan Botti, Evan Chambers, John Corigliano, Michael Daugherty, David Del Tredici, John Harbison, Stephen Hartke, Jennifer Higdon, Lee Hyla, Lowell Liebermann, David Maslanka, James MacMillan, Thea Musgrave, Robert Paterson, Shulamit Ran, Christopher Theofanidis, Augusta Read Thomas, Barton McLean, Priscilla McLean, Michael Torke, Joan Tower and Chen Yi. In addition, works by faculty composers Donald Grantham, Kevin Puts (former faculty member), Russell Pinkston, Yevgeniy Sharlat and Dan Welcher are performed regularly as well as music composed by local Austin and Texas composers.
