= Jack Vees =

American composer and bassist

Jack Vees (born 1955) is an American composer and bassist from Camden, New Jersey.

== Biography ==
Both a performer (electric bass/guitar and electronics) and a composer, Vees has written music for his own ensemble, Chez Vees, and for groups such as Ensemble Modern, California EAR Unit, and Zeitgeist (ensemble). He has collaborated with performers Ashley Bathgate, Libby Van Cleve, Amy Knoles, Jeffrey Krieger, and Ben Verdery, as well as various choreographers and video artists. Influences include Louis Andriessen, John Cage, George Crumb, Charles Ives, Erik Satie, Joel Thome, and Captain Beefheart (Don Van Vliet).

Vees holds an undergraduate degree from Glassboro State College and an M.F.A. from California Institute of the Arts. Previous composition teachers include Louis Andriessen, Vinko Globokar, Stephen L. Mosko, Bernard Rands, and Morton Subotnick.

Vees currently resides in Guilford, Connecticut with his wife Libby Van Cleve. He was formerly the operations director and instructor of the Center of Studies in Music Technology at the Yale School of Music.

== Notable compositions ==
=== Solo (with or without electronics) ===
National Anthem (2000) for guitar and electronics

Surf Music Again (1996) for guitar and electronics

Rocket Baby (1994) for electric cello and midi cellos

Apocrypha (1986) for oboe and electronic tape

John Henry (1984) for bass guitar

=== Small ensemble ===
Piano Trio (Hulk Smash!) (1994) for three players on two pianos

Tattooed Barbie (1991) for 12-string guitar, oboe, and computer

Saints Before the Vanishing Point (1990) for small ensemble

Colorized Chaplin (1989) for electric guitar and harpsichord

Child Bride (1988) for cello, electronics, and midi

=== Theatrical works / opera / multimedia ===
Feynman (2003-2005), chamber opera

Piece for Composition (1987) for multimedia and percussion

== Discography ==
2001: Ben Verdery – Soe-Pa. CD Baby.

- Strummage

2000: The Restaurant Behind the Pier. Recommended Records.

- The Restaurant Behind the Pier
- John Henry
- Monsiur Piñata
- Surf Music II

1998: Emergency Music. Composers Recordings, Inc.

- Prom Face Devotion

1997: Surf Music Again. Composers Recordings, Inc.

- Tattooed Barbie
- Stigmata non Grata
- Piano Trio
- Rocket Baby Electric
- Piano Trio (Hulk Smash!)
- SPNFL
- Surf Music Again

== Publications ==
The Book on Bass Harmonics. Alfred Music Publishers. 1981.
