= Libby Van Cleve =

American oboist

- Born: August 22, 1958 (age 68)
- Occupations: Oboist; Director of Yale's Oral History of American Music
- Partner: Jack Vees

Libby Van Cleve (born August 22, 1958) is an American oboist and Director of Yale University's Oral History of American Music.

== Education and personal life ==
Van Cleve has received the following degrees:

- Bachelor of Arts degree in Music and Religious Studies from Bowdoin College
- Master of Fine Arts Degree in Oboe Performance from the California Institute of the Arts
- Master of Music, Master of Musical Arts, and Doctor of Musical Arts in Oboe Performance from the Yale School of Music

She currently resides in Guilford, Connecticut with husband Jack Vees, a composer and bassist, and their daughter Nola.

== Oboist ==
Libby Van Cleve has recorded works of composers such as Anthony Braxton, Ingram Marshall, Jack Vees, and Eleanor Hovda on oboe, English horn, and oboe d'amore. Through the 1990s, she also collaborated with the avant-garde and now inactive Nancy Meehan Dance Company many times. Van Cleve currently teaches oboe at Wesleyan University in Middletown, Connecticut and at Connecticut College in New London, CT.

In 2004, Van Cleve published her first book, Oboe Unbound: Contemporary Techniques. Composer Anthony Braxton said of the book: "The release of this book will extend the evolution and exploratory dimensions of creative oboe music. It is a must-have for any serious student of oboe music." In 2014, a revised edition was released. Prominent oboist Allan Vogel commented, "Oboe Unbound is inspiring comprehensive, and easy to learn from...I recommend it highly." As a more recent project, Van Cleve has released the first three Bach Cello Suites, edited for oboe, through The Music Source, T.D. Ellis Music Publishing.

== OHAM ==
Van Cleve began her work at the Oral History of American Music as assistant to the director in 1993 and in 2000, became associate director. In 2004, Van Cleve spearheaded efforts which resulted in a $148,000 grant toward preserving OHAM's recordings from the Save America's Treasures initiative. Her second book was published in 2005, Composers' Voices From Ives to Ellington, co-written with Vivian Perlis. In 2006, the two co-authors received ASCAP's Deems Taylor Special Recognition Award for their work. In 2010, Libby Van Cleve succeeded Vivian Perlis as Director of the Oral History of American Music project.

== Selected discography ==
With Anthony Braxton

- Ensemble (New York) 1995 (Braxton House, 1995 [1997])
- Trillium R (Braxton House, 2000)
- Trillium J (Braxton House, 2015)

With Others

- 2012: Life Field, music by David Rosenboom, Tzadik
- 2012: The Eleanor Hovda Collection, music by Hovda, Innova Records
- 2007: Thousand Year Dreaming, by Annea Lockwood, Pogus Records
- 2001: Dark Waters, music by Ingram Marshall, New Albion
- 1996: Surf Music Again, music by Jack Vees, CRI
