= Philip Clapp =

Philip Clapp may refer to:

- Johnny Knoxville (Philip John Clapp, Jr., born 1971), American actor, comedian and stunt performer
- Philip Greeley Clapp (1888–1954), American educator, conductor, pianist and composer
