= First You Build a Cloud =

Studio album by Andy Summers and Ben Verdery
- Released: 2007
- Recorded: June 2004
- Studio: Shant Hall, Venice Beach, California
- Genre: Jazz, avant-garde
- Length: 46:17
- Label: Rare Recordings
- Producer: Andy Summers, Ben Verdery, Dennis Smith

Andy Summers chronology
Splendid Brazil (2005)	First You Build a Cloud (2007)	Fundamental (2012)

Ben Verdery chronology
Two Generations: Concerti for Guitar and Chamber Orchestra (1986)	First You Build a Cloud (2007)

First You Build a Cloud is an album by guitarists Andy Summers and Ben Verdery on the Rare Recordings label. The album consists of twelve guitar duets, with Verdery on acoustic and Summers on electric.

== Origin ==
Summers and Verdery originally met backstage at the 92nd St. Y in New York in January 2002 on the occasion of a guitar marathon. Although their musical background was somewhat different (Summers coming from rock and jazz, and Verdery from classical guitar), both musicians realized that they had played in each others main style on multiple occasions in the past. Verdery had occasionally included rock-soul material in his repertoire, including pieces by Jimi Hendrix, Prince and Otis Blackwell, while Summers had studied classical guitar at California State University, Northridge from 1969 to 1973. They agreed to meet a few weeks later at Summers' home studio in Venice Beach, California, to explore musical ideas and create a hybrid non-generic style.

The concept to record an album together eventually solidified when Summers and Verdery were approached by classical composer Ingram Marshall to perform in a concerto for acoustic and electric guitar he was putting together called Dark Florescence. Summers and Verdery offered to improvise for him to provide inspiration – a move that prompted Verdery to reflect that this might have been a good way to put together an album. When the duo reconvened in Venice Beach, they started exchanging ideas with Verdery on acoustic and Summers on electric. With the exception of cover renditions of The Police's "Bring on the Night" and Johann Sebastian Bach's "Sarabande" and a brand new composition by Summers ("Now I'm Free"), all the remaining pieces in the album are the result of improvisations in the studio. An extra track, "Brotherhood of the Grape" (a reference to the musicians' shared love for wine) was recorded but left out of the album. It is, however, available in an early promotional pressing of the CD.

On his performing classical music for guitar, Summers said: "I have always been very attracted to more edgy classical composers like Varese, Messiaen and Stravinsky; Toru Takemitsu would be another one. I had gone to college for four years and studied music, so there was a lot of stuff like that in my head—very contemporary, 20th Century classical music writing. I was drawn towards all that and wanted to express all those textures through the guitar. I came to a place where the things we can do now with pedals to create these incredible textures became very appealing to me." Verdery remembers that during the recording process he was "reminded of the genius jazz composer/pianist Thelonius Monk who said 'After two takes, you are imitating yourself'. After two takes of 'Fingertips on Earth', our trusted engineer Dennis Smith remarked: 'That was easy. In two takes we have a new tune", to which Andy replied, 'Two takes and a lifetime of work'".

Following Marshall's event at Carnegie Hall on 3 March 2003, Summers and Verdery went on to perform the album in its entirety in a string of concerts in Ireland and at Yale University School of Music in New Haven (where Verdery has been guitar professor since 1985)[5] in 2006 and 2007. Further promotional activities were however curtailed when Summers rejoined The Police for the 2007-2008 The Police Reunion Tour.

== Track listing ==
All tracks are written by Andy Summers and Ben Verdery except where noted.

No.	Title	Length
1.	"First You Build a Cloud"	4:31
2.	"Skywalking Woman"	3:57
3.	"Fez"	2:08
4.	"Bring on the Night" (Sting)	6:06
5.	"World Piece"	3:46
6.	"Love in the Time Of"	3:28
7.	"Now I'm Free" (Summers)	5:22
8.	"Stone Town"	3:45
9.	"Fingertips on Earth"	1:46
10.	"The Girl from Reykjavik"	2:29
11.	"Flow"	4:12
12.	"Sarabande" (J.S. Bach)	4:47

== Production ==
- Andy Summers, Ben Verdery, Dennis Smith – producers
- Dennis Smith – recording, mixing
- Norman Moore – art direction & design
- Andy Summers – cover photography
- Recorded June 2004 at Shant Hall, "Venice Beach, Californshire"
