= Oral History of American Music =

Audio & video interview archive at Yale University

- Abbreviation: OHAM
- Formation: 1969; 57 years ago
- Location: Sterling Memorial Library, Yale University, New Haven, Connecticut
- Official language: English
- Director: Libby Van Cleve
- Founder: Vivian Perlis
- Parent organization: Yale University Library
- Website: http://web.library.yale.edu/oham/about
- Formerly called: Oral History, American Music

Oral History of American Music (OHAM), founded in 1969, is an oral history project and archive of audio and video recordings consisting mainly of interviews with American classical and jazz musicians. It is a special collection of the Irving S. Gilmore Music Library at Yale University and housed within the Sterling Memorial Library building in New Haven, Connecticut. It currently holds approximately 3,000 interviews with more than 900 subjects and is considered the definitive collection of its kind.

== Background ==
The creation of Oral History of American Music was a result of musicologist Vivian Perlis's research on the life of American composer Charles Ives, for which she interviewed sixty individuals who had known him personally. During the course of the interviews, Perlis recognized the need for a larger project that would collect and preserve the oral history of American composers, and began the OHAM project in 1969 with that intent. Perlis's interviews with friends, family and colleagues of Ives became OHAM's initial collection, and were later used in her 1974 book, Charles Ives Remembered: An Oral History, for which she received the American Musicological Society's Otto Kinkeldey Award—the first time it had been awarded either to a woman or for work on American music. In addition to Perlis's biography of Ives, the project's collection played an instrumental role in a number of other historical works: A Good Dissonance Like a Man, a documentary film about Ives; Aaron Copland's two-volume autobiography Copland: 1900 through 1942 and Copland: Since 1943, co-written with Perlis; and the book Composers' Voices from Ives to Ellington, co-written by Perlis and Libby Van Cleve. Perlis served as the project's director until she retired in 2010 and was succeeded by its current director, Van Cleve.

OHAM expanded through interviews conducted by Perlis, Van Cleve and others, as well as by acquisitions of recordings from scholars, radio producers, and concert presenters. Its largest component today is the Major Figures in American Music series, which primarily documents classical composers at varying stages in their careers. OHAM also holds five series of extensive interviews centered around specific persons and topics.

Grants to preserve and digitize OHAM's recordings have come from the Grammy Foundation, Gladys Krieble Delmas Foundation, the National Endowment for the Humanities, and the Save America's Treasures initiative. In 2009, the Aaron Copland Fund for Music donated $500,000 to establish an endowment fund for the organization.

In January 2019, OHAM announced a new research guide entitled An African American Studies Critical Guide to Oral History of American Music. This guide was created by Clara Wilson-Hawkins. It highlights the voices of people of color represented in OHAM's oral histories, with a focus on African American figures and music, as well as those whose work has been influenced by and/or shaped African American music from the early twentieth century through today.

In January 2020, OHAM celebrated its 50th anniversary with a special exhibit entitled reVox. The exhibit featured multimedia compositions whose audio elements were, in part, drawn from the OHAM archives. In March of the same year, the Yale University Library launched an online exhibition, The Struggles and Triumphs of Bessie Jones, Big Mama Thornton, and Ethel Waters. The exhibition, curated by OHAM affiliate Daniella Posy, highlights major moments in Jones, Thornton, and Waters' respective careers using raw materials from OHAM's archives.

== Collections ==
Oral History of American Music's collection consists primarily of audio and video interviews which are digitized and transcribed. The collection is split into six major components in addition to its acquired materials:

- Major Figures in American Music: audio and video interviews with about 1,000 composers, performers, and other significant musicians
- The Ives Project
- The Paul Hindemith Project
- The Duke Ellington Oral History
- The Steinway Project: an oral history of the Steinway & Sons company
- The Yale Student Composers Project: video interviews with graduate student composers at the Yale School of Music
- The Alone Together Series: video interviews with composers and music professionals regarding the impact of the COVID-19 pandemic.

== Access ==
OHAM provides access to interview recordings and text transcripts for personal research use, teaching, and educational purposes. Free online streaming of most interview recordings is available for a limited period of 30 days. Digital copies of most transcripts are also available at no charge. Researchers can visit OHAM's access page for complete and up-to-date access information.
