= Vivian Perlis =

American musicologist (1928–2019)

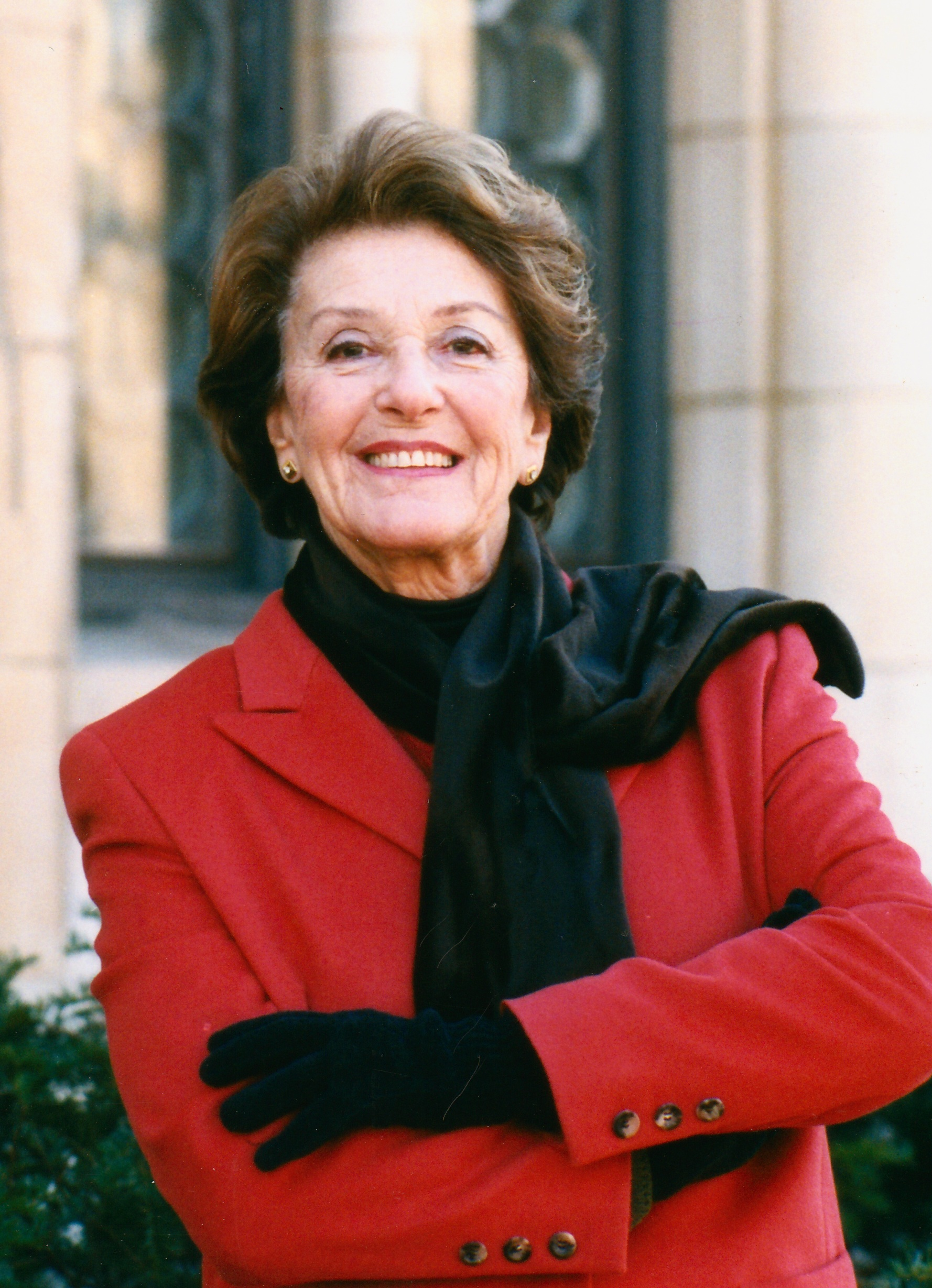
- Born: April 26, 1928; Brooklyn, New York
- Died: July 4, 2019 (aged 91); Weston, Connecticut
- Education: University of Michigan
- Occupations: Oral historian Former director of Oral History of American Music
- Partner: Dr. Sanford J. Perlis

Vivian Perlis (April 26, 1928 – July 4, 2019) was an American musicologist and the founder and former director of Yale University's Oral History of American Music.

== Personal life ==
Vivian Perlis was born in Brooklyn, New York. After growing up in Long Island, N.Y., she attended the University of Michigan, studying classical harp and piano. In addition to her bachelor's degree, she earned a master's degree in music history at the University of Michigan (BM 1949, MM 1952). She was also an enrolled as a doctoral student at Columbia University between 1962 and 1964. During this time she also taught music history at a number of college throughout New England.

Vivian eventually moved to Westport, Connecticut, with her husband, Dr. Sanford J. Perlis, and three children. While performing as a harpist with the New Haven Symphony Orchestra, she took a job as a reference librarian at Yale University in 1959. She died on July 4, 2019, at the age of 91.

== Oral history career ==
As a music librarian for Yale, Perlis worked with The Charles Ives Papers. In 1968, she had an opportunity to interview the elderly Julian Myrick, Ives’ insurance business partner. Recognizing the profound usefulness of recorded memories such as these, Perlis began collecting interviews with other acquaintances of Charles Ives. These amounted to sixty-two tapes and transcripts. In 1974, Perlis used this collection to write the book Charles Ives Remembered, which was the first documentation of a musical figure through the use of oral history. In 1975, the book won the American Musicological Society's Otto Kinkeldey Award, their most prestigious book award. Perlis was the first female recipient, and this was the first time the award was given for an American musical subject. The book was also honored with the Connecticut Book Publishers Award.

While conducting her Ives research, Perlis recognized the value of oral history to document musical figures, and she founded the Oral History of American Music (formerly Oral History, American Music) in 1969.

Perlis and composer Aaron Copland first became friends while working on the Ives project. Copland later wrote the preface for her book, Charles Ives Remembered. As the Ives project finished, Perlis focused on Copland as her new subject. From 1975-’76, she conducted many hours of interviews with Copland and those closest to him. Finally in 1984 and 1989, their efforts culminated in the autobiographies, Copland: 1900 through 1942 and Copland: Since 1943, co-authored by Perlis.

Oral History of American Music (OHAM) holds over 2,200 interviews and transcripts and is a special collection within Yale University's Irving S. Gilmore Music Library. The core unit, Major Figures in American Music, includes interviews with composers, classical performers, and jazz musicians. OHAM also holds projects on Ives, Paul Hindemith, Steinway & Sons, and Duke Ellington, video interviews with Yale graduate composers, and acquisitions.

In 2005, Perlis released a new book, Composers’ Voices From Ives to Ellington, which was co-written with Libby Van Cleve. The book celebrates 20th century composers and includes two CDs of interview material.

Perlis announced her retirement from Oral History of American Music in 2010. She died at her home in Weston, Connecticut, on July 4, 2019, at the age of 91, following an illness.

== Media production ==
Preceding the success of Charles Ives Remembered, Perlis produced and wrote the liner notes for Charles Ives, the 100th Anniversary, a five-record set, which includes excerpts of Perlis’ oral history interviews. The box set was nominated for the Grammy Awards' Best Classical Album in 1975. Then, in 1977, Perlis was historical consultant to the PBS Ives documentary, A Good Dissonance Like a Man. This documentary also used excerpts from her oral history interviews.

In the next thirteen years, Perlis went on to write and produce three documentaries about other oral history subjects and interviewees for the PBS American Masters Series: Memories of Eubie (Eubie Blake; 1980), Aaron Copland: A Self Portrait (1985), and John Cage: I Have Nothing to Say and I Am Saying It (1990).

== Awards ==
- The National Institute of Arts and Letters Charles Ives award 1971
- The New England Association of Oral History's Harvey Kantor Award 1984
- A Guggenheim Fellowship
- The Society for American Music's Irving Lowens Award 1991
- Letter of Distinction from American Music Center 2004
- Lifetime Achievement Award from the Society for American Music
- The Yale School of Music's Sanford Medal 2010
- Musical America Artist of the Year 2011
