= Composers Recordings, Inc. =

American record label

Composers Recordings, Inc. (CRI) was an American record label dedicated to the recording of contemporary classical music by American composers. It was founded in 1954 by Otto Luening, Douglas Moore, and Oliver Daniel, and based in New York City.

The label released over 600 recordings on LP, cassette, and CD. It went out of business in 2003 due to financial pressures, and the rights to CRI's recordings were transferred to New World Records in 2006.

== Selected composers ==
- Samuel Adler
- Dominick Argento
- Aaron Avshalomov
- Jacob Avshalomov
- Milton Babbitt
- Samuel Barber
- Jennifer Margaret Barker
- Leslie Bassett
- Irwin Bazelon
- William Bergsma
- Irving Berlin
- Chester Biscardi
- Marc Blitzstein
- Henry Brant
- Anthony Braxton
- Martin Bresnick
- Margaret Brouwer
- Earle Brown
- John Cage
- Ronald Caltabiano
- Elliott Carter
- Chou Wen-chung
- Chen Yi
- John Corigliano
- George Crumb
- Henry Cowell
- Alvin Curran
- David Diamond
- Jacob Druckman
- Judy Dunaway
- Donald Erb
- Morton Feldman
- Scott Fields
- Irving Fine
- Vivian Fine
- Ross Lee Finney
- Gene Gutchë
- Daron Hagen
- Roy Harris
- Lou Harrison
- Robert Helps
- Lee Hoiby
- Karel Husa
- Andrew Imbrie
- Charles Ives
- Philip James
- Leroy Jenkins
- Tom Johnson
- Ben Johnston
- Samuel Jones
- Victoria Jordanova
- Aaron Jay Kernis
- Guy Klucevsek
- Barbara Kolb
- Ernst Krenek
- Meyer Kupferman
- Ezra Laderman
- David Lang
- Benjamin Lees
- John Anthony Lennon
- Fred Lerdahl
- Otto Luening
- Tod Machover
- Donald Martino
- William Mayer
- Barton McLean
- Priscilla McLean
- Jacques de Menasce
- Peter Mennin
- Jeffrey Mumford
- Alwin Nikolais
- Pauline Oliveros
- Hall Overton
- Harry Partch
- P. Q. Phan
- Tobias Picker
- Cole Porter
- Shulamit Ran
- Bernard Rands
- Gardner Read
- Wallingford Riegger
- Vittorio Rieti
- Neil Rolnick
- Ned Rorem
- Dane Rudhyar
- Frederic Rzewski
- Roger Sessions
- Judith Shatin
- Alice Shields
- Hale Smith
- Harvey Sollberger
- Tan Dun
- Virgil Thomson
- Francis Thorne
- Joan Tower
- Lester Trimble
- Richard Aaker Trythall
- Chinary Ung
- Vladimir Ussachevsky
- Robert Ward
- Richard Wernick
- Robert Willoughby
- Stefan Wolpe
- Charles Wuorinen
- Zhou Long
- Evan Ziporyn

== See also ==
- List of record labels
