= Elizabeth Brown (musician) =

American composer and musical performer

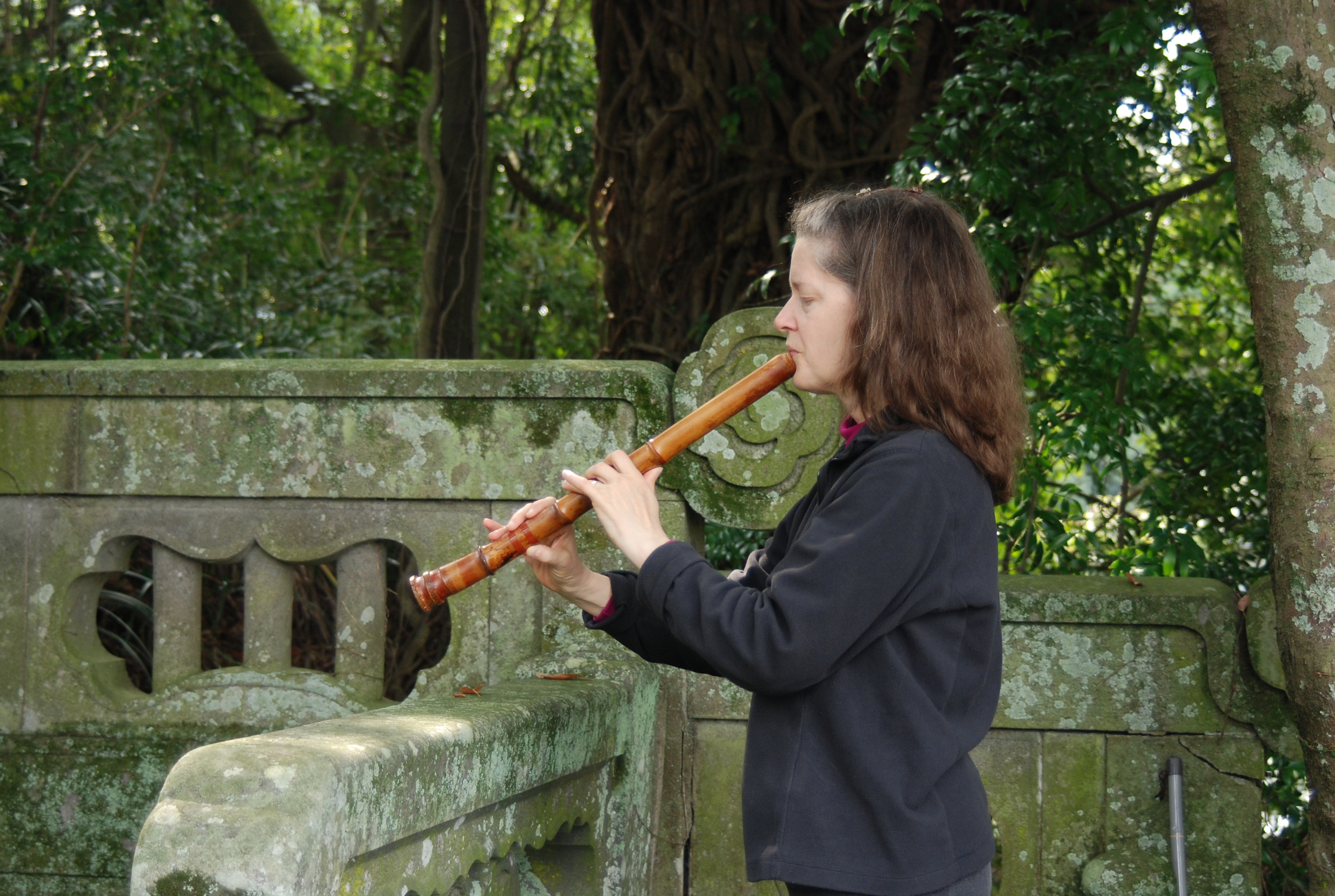
- Elizabeth Brown playing a shakuhachi
- Born: 1953 (age 71–72); Camden, Alabama, United States
- Education: The Juilliard School, University of Cincinnati – College-Conservatory of Music
- Known for: Composing, flute, shakuhachi, theremin
- Style: Contemporary, experimental
- Spouse: Lothar Osterburg
- Awards: Guggenheim Fellowship, New York Foundation for the Arts, New Music USA
- Website: Elizabeth Brown

Elizabeth Brown (born 1953) is an American contemporary composer and performer, known for music described as otherworldly, which employs microtonal expression, unique instrumentation and a morphing, freewheeling language. Her work is frequently commissioned for specific ensembles (e.g., Newband, Orpheus Chamber Orchestra) and has been performed internationally in solo, chamber and orchestral contexts at venues including Carnegie Hall, Boston's Symphony Hall, the Smithsonian Institution, and the Hanoi National Conservatory of Music. She has written extensively for flute, unconventional instruments such as the Partch complement and theremin, and the traditional Asian shakuhachi and đàn bầu; she combines them in original ways that mix Western and Eastern, ancient and modern, and experimental and conventionally melodic sensibilities. Composer and critic Robert Carl calls Brown a "gentle maverick" whose avant-gardism bends and subverts traditional tropes with an unironic, unpretentious manner "that is fresh and imaginative, but never afraid of beauty, nor of humane warmth."

As a multi-instrumentalist, Brown is best known for flute, shakuhachi and theremin. She has performed at Lincoln Center, Carnegie Hall, Symphony Hall in Boston, and the World Shakuhachi Festival (London), among other venues. Her music was recognized with a Guggenheim Fellowship in 2007; she has also received awards from the New York Foundation for the Arts, New Music USA, and composition competitions in Tokyo for traditional Japanese instrumentation, a rarity for a Westerner. Brown lives in Red Hook, New York in the Hudson Valley and is married to visual artist and frequent collaborator Lothar Osterburg.

Elizabeth Brown, Rural Electrification, staged chamber opera for voice, theremin and recorded sound, 2006, performance still.

== Early life and career ==
Elizabeth Cecile Brown was born in 1953 in the small town of Camden, Alabama and grew up on an agricultural research station and working farm there. Despite the area's cultural limitations, she studied piano, performed in church choirs and school bands, and took up the flute at age 16. After a year at University of Southern Mississippi, she transferred to College-Conservatory of Music in Cincinnati (BM, 1975), studying with Robert Cavally. She subsequently moved to New York, finding work as a union usher at Lincoln Center—a three-year experience she considers foundational to her education—and was accepted into The Juilliard School a year later.

After studying under Samuel Baron and earning a degree in flute performance at Juilliard (MM, 1977), Brown established herself in New York's freelance performance community. She subbed at the Metropolitan Opera and New Jersey Symphony Orchestra, and toured with groups such as Orpheus Chamber Orchestra and Philharmonia Virtuosi, gaining notice in the New York Times and other publications for her technique and musicianship. In the 1980s, as a member of a dance company, Gathering Wood, she began her composing career while in her late 20s, despite the lack of formal training in composition.

While on an orchestra tour of Japan during this period, Brown discovered the shakuhachi, an ancient Japanese bamboo flute whose varied, subtle tones she has likened to the private music in her head. The instrument evokes nature and was traditionally played by mendicant Zen monks as a mode of meditation. After studying in the Kinko School tradition with Ralph Samuelson, and Mizuno Komei and Yamato Shudo in Japan, the instrument became a major influence on her musical language. In subsequent years, Brown learned the theremin—after seeing a documentary on the life of Leon Theremin in the mid-1990s—and the đàn bầu (Vietnamese monochord), traveling to Vietnam to study in 2000. She has incorporated all three instruments into her composing.

== Composing ==
Brown's experience as a performer has shaped the way she composes. She gravitates toward instruments with distinctive, weightless timbres and the capacity for subtle inflections and wavering pitches, which glide in and out to blur or dissolve seemingly "normal" melodies and harmonies. As a result, her sound is often characterized as otherworldly, dreamlike and hallucinatory, whimsical, and sometimes, melancholy. Some writers compare her musical language to memory, with glimmers of thought emerging through microtonal expression, subtle textures, and unexpected recognizable sounds and musical references. Composer and critic Kyle Gann calls her approach a "smooth, introverted surrealism," blending stream-of-conscious non-sequiturs, strange conceits and quotations (of Classical, standards and folk music) into elegant wholes that draw listeners into complicity rather than provoking them. The American Record Guide writes that Brown combines "avant-garde gestures with open-hearted songfulness."

=== Flute and chamber music ===
Brown's flute compositions often employ an extended microtonal technique influenced by shakuhachi music and birdsong. The Los Angeles Times described her early piece "Augury" (1987, for flute and guitar) as a "mystical, quirky" work using simple tonal language, inventive guitar effects and dissonance; it won the National Flute Association’s (NFA) Newly Published Music Award in 1988. The NFA later commissioned Brown to write a solo flute piece for its 2000 high school contest: "Trillium" (1999), a delicate, three-part work.

Several of Brown's flute compositions use pre-recorded sound to explore themes involving memory, sensation and place. The cinematic "Travelogue" (1995, performed and recorded by the quartet Flute Force) blends fluctuating melodies, Asian microtonalism, and modernist bent pitch and multiphonic technique to evoke family car trips; its sonic suggestions of arguments, passing cars and a surreal carnival calliope mix humor, nostalgia, delicacy and occasional raucous energy. In 2006, Brown joined Flute Force and together they premiered her "The Baths of Caracalla" (2007) at Carnegie's Weill Hall; the piece surrounds four alto flutes with pre-recorded theremin, flute and psalter whose dissonances, shrieks and slides represent the sights and sounds of the ancient Roman public baths. "Arcana" (2004, commissioned by Toby and Itzhak Perlman) features an Eastern-flavored flute accompanied by recorded theremin and "homemade" drones, creaks, and scratches that evoke tender (a toy shop or dollhouse) and slightly spooky themes (secrets, mysteries, elixirs, intrigue).

Brown's first orchestral piece, "Lost Waltz" (1997), was commissioned by Orpheus Chamber Orchestra. Critics such as The New York Times's Bernard Holland compare its approach to Charles Ives and the repetitive phrases of Janacek, while noting Brown's characteristic "clouds of unreconciled fragments" (e.g., a stray, poignant passage of "Zip-a-Dee-Doo-Dah" on clarinet). Newsday likened its sound to "a ballroom in Atlantis [or] quickly flowing water: attractive, allusive, even poetic." The recording Blue Minor: Chamber Music by Elizabeth Brown (2003) contains five of Brown's flute compositions in chamber music contexts, including "Acadia" (1999), "Blue Minor" (2001), "The Memory Palace" (1990) and "Liguria" (1999), the latter commissioned for the New York New Music Ensemble. The fifth piece, "Figures in a Landscape" (1995) opens with harmonies recalling Aaron Copland, before creating what Kyle Gann calls "an inescapably eerie scene" by juxtaposing a straight-pitched piano with a wavering violin line like "a warped 78 rpm record."

=== Compositions for traditional Japanese instruments ===
Brown has composed many pieces that build on Japanese traditions while diverging in arrangement, orchestration, melodic twists or harmonic progressions. Several works—some created during national park residencies—exploit the shakuhachi's ability to evoke specific natural settings; these include "Acadia" (shakuhachi and flute), "Shakuhachi Duos from Isle Royale" (2005, evoking sound moving across Lake Superior), and "Afterimage" (2011, inspired by the Grand Canyon). The earlier "Hermit Thrush" (1991, shakuhachi) and "The Secret Life of Birds" (1992, flute and koto) use birdsong as inspiration.

Brown's first shakuhachi composition, "Migration" (1990), combines the instrument with a string trio in a dreamlike, spare sonic landscape that recalls traditional Japanese music and theater while retaining a sense of European melody and harmony; reviews suggest the work, a memorial to a friend, evokes both familiar and alien, tragedy and transcendence. Two pieces on Brown's recording Mirage (2013) won Japanese composition competition prizes. "Mirage" (2008; Senzoku Gakuen shakuhachi competition prize) integrates Brown's western training and eastern practice with an iconic shakuhachi riff answered by a string quartet and gentle waltz. "Shinshoufuukei (An Imagined Landscape)" (2010; Makino Yutaka Grand Prize for traditional Japanese instruments, 2011) is a four-movement work using a traditional Japanese orchestra in a nontraditional way; it is a somewhat austere and atypical work for Brown, exploring themes of contemplation, focused attention and longing with meditative, but insistent action driven by percussion rhythms.

=== Partch instrument works ===
Brown composed several works for the original microtonal instruments of American composer and inventor Harry Partch, performed internationally by Dean Drummond and Newband. "Archipelago" (1990) imposes a lyrical cello line over a hazy, multi-instrumental microtonal texture, balancing poetry, detail and the uncommon. "Delirium" (1997) challenges listeners with quietly playful, segueing quotations from "Oh! Susanna" and Prokofiev's Peter and the Wolf. The hallucinatory "Seahorse" (2008, also on Mirage) contrasts the propulsive physicality of Partch instruments with Brown's ethereal, floating theremin, evoking the title creature's marine odysseys with throbbing and wheezing, underwater-like sounds.

=== Compositions for theremin ===
Brown purchased a Moog Etherwave theremin in 1999; like the shakuhachi and đàn bầu, the instrument's flexible pitch and bending tones create an unearthly vocal quality. Critics distinguish Brown's flute-influenced theremin playing for its subtlety, lyricism and serious artistic intent, in contrast to its frequent use as a novelty instrument. Individual theremin works include "Beatitudes" (2003), "Arcana," "Seahorse," and "Atlantis" (2007, also on Mirage), whose expressively deformed, liquid-like sound (blended theremin and acoustic slide guitar) reviews have likened to "submerged" Segovia or Albéniz.

Elizabeth Brown, A Bookmobile for Dreamers, video and opera performance for theremin and recorded sound in collaboration with Lothar Osterburg, 2011, performance still.

In 2006, Brown premiered the staged chamber opera Rural Electrification (for voice, theremin and recorded sound) at Brooklyn's Old American Can Factory. A meditation on progress and labor exploring the effects of the advent of electricity on a young rural woman, it was inspired by Brown's Mississippi farming predecessors and historic pamphlets distributed by the Alabama Power Company. The opera featured a duet between soprano vocals (by performance artist Stephanie Skaff) and Brown's cello-like theremin (which mixes in riffs from "Old MacDonald Had a Farm" and "You Are My Sunshine," addressed to a light bulb); they are augmented by field recordings of birds, wind, crickets, creaking wood and clanking metal, and video projections of rustic, rural scenes created by artist Lothar Osterburg.

Brown has created theremin works for several multimedia/performance collaborations with Osterburg, including "Piranesi" (2007), "A Bookmobile for Dreamers" (2011), and "Babel" (2019). "Piranesi" (theremin and string quartet) blends expressive, microtonal vibrato and the high octave and rare lowest register of the theremin to create airy, eerie patterns; Robert Carl compares its color and texture to Ravel. A Bookmobile for Dreamers (theremin and recorded sound) is a video/opera exploring reading, libraries, culture and imagination through a dialogue between Brown's dreamlike playing and the rambling title vehicle, rendered in Osterburg's whimsical style. Other theremin works include "Arboretum" (2013) and "To Walk Humbly" (2014), a memorial to Vietnam War veteran and peace advocate Colonel Robert Rheault.

== Performance and collaborations ==
Brown has performed on flute with the American Composers Orchestra, Orpheus Chamber Orchestra, Philharmonia Virtuosi, and Momenta Quartet, among others. She has played theremin with Newband, the American Symphony Orchestra at Lincoln Center, the Boston Symphony Orchestra at Symphony Hall, and at Carnegie Hall. She has also played shakuhachi with the New York City Opera, Kohei Nishikawa, Ralph Samuelson, Issui Minegishi, and Momenta Quartet.

In addition to her work with Lothar Osterburg, Brown has collaborated with artist Lorie Novak on the multimedia installations Collected Visions (1992, 2000), which explore female identity, memory and intergenerationality through projected photographs and music. For the AIDS Quilt Songbook, she set Marie Howe's poem A Certain Light to music (for baritone and piano) in 1992.

== Recognition and awards ==
Brown has received a Guggenheim Fellowship (2007), New York Foundation for the Arts fellowships (1992, 2000), and Composers Assistance Program Grants from New Music USA (1994, 2008, 2011). In addition to composition prizes in Japan, she won an Ether Music prize for an original work for theremin in 2005. In 2004, she was awarded recording grants by the Mary Flagler Cary Charitable Trust and Aaron Copland Fund.

Brown has received composer residencies from Montclair State University, Bravo! Vail Valley Music Festival, and Cape and Islands Chamber Music Festival, among others, and artist residencies at the Hanoi National Conservatory of Music, Bellagio Center (Rockefeller Foundation), Bogliasco Foundation, MacDowell Colony, and several national parks. She has received commissions from New Music USA, Electronic Music Foundation, Music from Japan, Fromm Music Foundation, Dartmouth Symphony Orchestra, and many musical ensembles, among others.

== Discography ==
- Elizabeth Brown: Mirage, New World Records (2013)
- Blue Minor: Chamber Music by Elizabeth Brown, Albany Records (2003)
- The Universal Flute, Ralph Samuelson, Innova (2016) – "Afterimage"
- Emergency Music (Bang on a Can Live Vol. II ), Various artists, Composers Recordings, Inc. (1993) – "Migration"
- The Aids Quilt Songbook, Harmonia Mundi (1994) – "A Certain Light"
- Dance of the Seven Veils, Newband (1996) – "Archipelago"
- eyewitness, Flute Force, Innova (2002) – "Travelogue"
