= Dan Welcher =

American classical composer

Dan Welcher (born March 2, 1948) is an American composer, conductor, and music educator.

== Biography ==
Welcher was born in Rochester, New York and earned degrees from the Eastman School of Music and the Manhattan School of Music, studying bassoon, piano, and composition. He was principal bassooonist at the Louisville Orchestra and a professor of composition and music theory at University of Louisville from 1972 to 1978. He additionally taught at the Aspen Music Festival and School from 1976 until 1990, and began teaching at the University of Texas at Austin in 1978. He founded the UT New Music Ensemble and served as the assistant conductor of the Austin Symphony Orchestra from 1980 until 1990.

Welcher's compositions include concertos, symphonies, vocal literature, piano solos, and various kinds of chamber music. He also wrote two operas, Della's Gift, which premiered in Austin in 1987, and Holy Night, which premiered in 2004. Della's Gift has been performed with several opera companies including the New York City Opera. His works have been performed by such ensembles as the Atlanta Symphony Orchestra, Chicago Symphony Orchestra, the Honolulu Symphony, the Boston Pops Orchestra, the Utah Symphony, the Dallas Symphony Orchestra, and the St. Louis Symphony Orchestra. His music is published by the Theodore Presser Company, among others. Recently completed works include Personal Ads: Eight Cabaret Songs, which is a song cycle for piano, soprano and tenor, and the Fifth Symphony, premiered by the Austin Symphony Orchestra on May 1, 2009.

Welcher's numerous accolades include awards and fellowships from the Guggenheim Foundation, National Endowment for the Arts, the Rockefeller Foundation, the MacDowell Colony, Yaddo, the American Music Center, and ASCAP.

For several years, Welcher hosted a weekly radio series called Knowing the Score, aimed at introducing listeners to contemporary classical music.

Welcher held the Lee Hage Jamail Regents Professorship in Composition at the University of Texas, teaching music composition, and served as director of the UT New Music Ensemble until his abrupt departure in 2019 following numerous allegations of sexual misconduct as reported in a September 26, 2019, article in VAN magazine.

== List of works ==
=== Orchestra ===
- Beyond Sight (for a tone poem after Plato for orchestra; 1999)
- Bridges (for five pieces for string orchestra; 1991)
- Bright Wings: A Valediction (for large orchestra; 1996)
- Castle Creek Fanfare/Overture (for large orchestra; 1989)
- Concerto de [sic] Camera (for bassoon and small orchestra; 1975)
- Concerto for Clarinet (for clarinet and orchestra; 1989)
- Concerto for Flute (for flute and orchestra; 1974)
- Concerto for Piano (Shiva's Drum) (for piano and orchestra; 1993)
- Concerto for Timpani (for timpani and orchestra; 2004)
- Concerto for Violin (for violin and orchestra; 1993)
- Dervishes (for ritual dance scene for orchestra; 1976)
- Haleakala: How Maui Snared the Sun (for narrator and orchestra; 1991)
- Jackpot: A Celebratory Overture (for large orchestra; 2005)
- Prairie Light: Three Texas Water Colors of Georgia O'Keeffe (for orchestra; 1985)
- Spumante (for festive overture for large orchestra; 1998)
- Symphony No. 1 (for orchestra; 1992)
- Symphony No. 2 Night Watchers (for large orchestra; 1994)
- Symphony No. 5 (for large symphony orchestra; 2009)
- The Visions of Merlin (for orchestra; 1980)
- Venti di Mare (Sea Winds) (for fantasy-concerto for oboe and small orchestra; 1999)
- Zion (for orchestra; 1999)

=== Wind band ===
- Arches: An Impression for Concert Band (for concert band; 1984)
- Castle Creek Overture (for band; 1989)
- Circular Marches (for large wind ensemble; 1997)
- Glacier (for large wind ensemble; 2003)
- For The Mystic Harmony (for large wind ensemble; 2017)
- Laboring songs (for large wind ensemble; 1997)
- Minstrels of the Kells (for concert band; 2002)
- Perpetual Song (for concert band; 2000)
- Songs Without Words: Five Mood Pieces for Wind Ensemble (for wind ensemble; 2001)
- Spumante (for wind ensemble; 1999)
- Symphony No. 3 Shaker Life (for concert band; 1998)
- Symphony No. 4 American Visionary (for large wind ensemble; 2005)
- The Yellowstone Fires (for large wind ensemble; 1988)
- Zion (for wind ensemble; 1994)

=== Chamber music ===
- A Rag for Rags (for brass sextet and percussion; also for piano; 1984)
- All the Words to All the Songs (for flute and piano; 1996)
- Another Rag for Rags (for violin and piano; 2001)
- Brass Quintet (for brass quintet; 1982)
- Chameleon Music (for ten percussionists; 1987)
- Dante Dances (for clarinet and piano; 1995)
- Elizabethan Variations (for four recorders; 1968)
- Firewing: The Flame and the Moth (for oboe and percussion; 1968)
- Florestan's Falcon (for flute and piano; 2002)
- Harbor Music (String Quartet #2) (for string quartet; 1992)
- Hauntings (for tuba ensemble; 1986)
- Listen Up! A Guide to Melody, Harmony, Rhythm, Tonecolor and Counterpoint (for woodwind quintet; 1986)
- Mill Songs (Four Metamorphoses after Schubert) (for oboe and bassoon; 1997)
- Museon Polemos (War of the Muses)
- Nocturne and Dance (for trumpet and piano; 1966)
- Partita (for horn, violin, and piano; 1980)
- Phaedrus (for violin, clarinet, and piano; 1995)
- Quintet (for clarinet and string quartet; 2001)
- Reversible Jackets: Exercises in Conjugal Counterpoint (for flute and clarinet; 1987)
- Spirit Realms (Three Meditations) (for flute (dbl. piccolo & alto flute) and percussion; 1996)
- Stigma (for solo contrabass and piano; 1990)
- String Quartet No. 1 (for string quartet; 1988)
- The Wind Won't Listen (for bassoon and string quartet; 2002)
- Trio (for violin, violoncello, and piano; 1975)
- Tsunami (for cello, percussion and piano; 1991)
- White Mares of the Moon (for flute and harp; 1986)
- Woodwind Quintet No. 1 (for woodwind quintet; 1967)
- Woodwind Quintet No. 2 (for woodwind quintet; 1977)
- You Can Fool... (for percussion quartet; 2009)
- Zephyrus (for flute, violin, viola, and cello; 1990)

=== Keyboard ===
- Dance Variations (for solo piano; 1979)
- Dreaming of Goldberg (for adult beginning piano; 1979)
- High Tech Etudes (for solo piano; 1988)
- Pachel's Bells (for solo piano; 1986)
- Sonatina (for solo piano; 1972)
- The Birth of Shiva (for solo piano; 1999)

=== Opera ===
- A Star Over Fifth Avenue (2003)
- Della's Gift (for opera in two acts; 1986)
- Holy Night (for opera in three scenes and an epilogue; 2003)
- The Yellow Wallpaper (seven scenes; 2010)

=== Vocal and choral ===
- Abeja Blanca (for mezzo-soprano, english horn, and piano; 1979)
- Canticle of the Sun (for mezzo-soprano, mixed chorus, and organ; 2000)
- Evening Scenes: Three Poems of James Agee (for tenor and chamber ensemble; 1985)
- Four More Personal Ads (for tenor and piano; 2009)
- Four Personal Ads (for soprano and piano; 2007)
- Go Slow, My Soul (for medium voice and piano; 2003)
- How to Make Coq au Vin (for voice and piano; 2005)
- JFK: The Voice of Peace (for an oratorio for orchestra, chorus, and speakers; 1999)
- Leaves of Grass (for a cappella choir; 2004)
- My Life Closed Twice (for medium voice and piano; 2004)
- Remembrance in Black and White (for mezzo-soprano, flute, clarinet, violin, viola, cello, piano, and percussion; 2001)
- The Bequest (for soprano and flute; 1976)
- Tickets for a Prayer Wheel (for baritone and viola; 1997)
- Vox femina: A Cycle of Poems by and about Women (for soprano, flute, clarinet, violin, cello, and piano; 1984)
