= Flute Force =

American classical flute ensemble

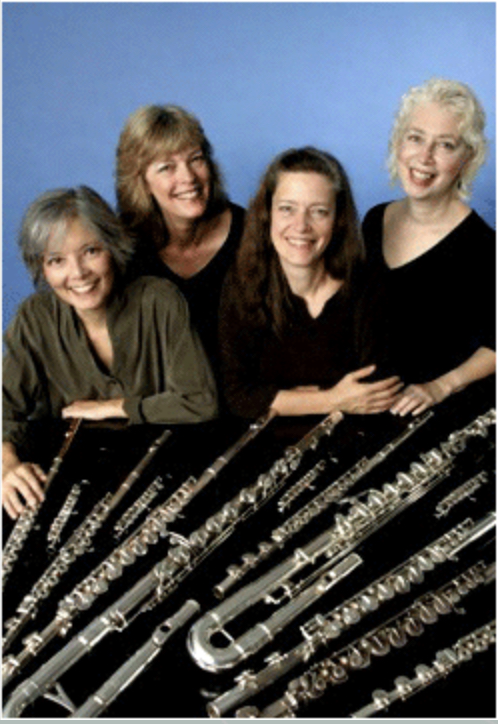

Background information
- Origin: New York, New York, United States
- Genres: Classical
- Occupation: Flute quartet
- Instrument(s): 4 flutes, various types
- Years active: 1981–present
- Members: Rie Schmidt; Wendy Stern; Sheryl Henze; Kathleen Nester
- Past members: Peter Bacchus; Deborah Baron; John Sebastian Winston; Peter Ader; Rachel Rudich; Gretchen Pusch; Elizabeth Brown; Patti Monson
- Website: Flute Force

Flute Force is a New York City-based flute quartet formed in 1981. Since 2016, the ensemble has consisted of Sheryl Henze, Kathleen Nester, Rie Schmidt and Wendy Stern. Flute Force has been recognized by critics for its unique composition, wide-ranging programs and recordings, and virtuosic performances of classical and traditional works. The group is also known for expanding the repertoire and timbre of the flute through the discovery of serious and demanding compositions and the development of new transcriptions, arrangements and original commissions that challenge the conventional expectations of the instrument. Musical America called Flute Force "an extremely persuasive advocate for the flute quartet medium: four top-quality players in a perfectly balanced and expressive ensemble."

== History ==
Frequently billed as one of the first professional flute ensembles in the United States, Flute Force was formed in 1981 by Peter Bacchus, Deborah Baron, Rie Schmidt and John Sebastian Winston.

Flute Force has performed throughout the United States and Canada, at venues such as Carnegie Weill Recital Hall, Merkin Hall, the San Francisco Museum of Modern Art, numerous universities including Yale and Johns Hopkins, and in convention performances for the National Flute Association and New York Flute Club. The group has collaborated in concerts with flutists Julius Baker, Paula Robison and Keith Underwood, and was invited to perform at the Australian Flute Festival in 2002. It has also appeared on National Public Radio, New York Public Radio, and New York and New Jersey public television.

== Music and critical reception ==
Flute Force is representative of a contemporary music phenomenon: the rebirth of consorts—unique chamber combinations of like or varied instruments initially popular in Elizabethan England—which have inspired a range of latter-20th-century formats and compositions. The ensemble has also contributed to a resurgence of interest in the flute during which flutists have incorporated new sounds influenced by diverse cultures and electronic music. Each member of Flute Force plays the entire flute family—the piccolo, standard "C" flute, alto and bass—which in performance has resulted in an increasingly intricate choreography between instruments, roles, distinct individual sounds and blending.

Reviews of the group's concerts have commented on their wide-ranging programs and combinations, "glittering variety of accents" and unaffected, tuneful style. Edith Eisler of New York Concert Review wrote, "Their intonation, balance and ensemble are impeccable ... they frequently and unobtrusively switch instruments and democratically share the leading role."

=== Repertoire ===
In addition to discovering existent works composed for flute, Flute Force has transcribed or had new arrangements created for pieces written for other instruments, as well as commissioned and premiered more than twenty-five new works. Composers who have written commissioned works for the ensemble include: Jeremy Beck, Jeffrey Brooks, Elizabeth Brown, Robert Dick, Donald Martin Jenni, John Morton, Marty Regan, Joseph Schwantner, Eric Stokes and James Tenney.

The group's diverse repertoire has featured works by other 20th-century composers, such as Richard Arnest, Gershwin, Scott Joplin, Anthony Newman, Florent Schmitt, Stravinsky and John Thow. It has performed or recorded pieces by pre-20th-century composers, including Boismortier, William Byrd, Haydn, Friedrich Kuhlau, Mozart, Michael Praetorius, G.P. Telemann and Vivaldi, among others.

=== Recordings ===
Flute Force has released four of its own recordings. Its first, Flute Force (1989), included contemporary works by Ingolf Dahl, Harvey Sollberger, Roger Reynolds, Preston Trombly, David Evan Jones and Peter Bacchus. The recording has been described as an assertive, adventurous program that stretches the flute's capabilities with expressionist effects, introspective moments and textural manipulations. Fanfare reviewer Art Lange wrote, "As demanding and unconventional as these scores may get, Flute Force is nevertheless up to the task: more importantly, with their compatible timbres, soothing ensemble blend, and musical intelligence, they convince us that these pieces communicate as music."

On Pastorale (1996), the ensemble performed works by Barber (Schmidt's arrangement of the Adagio), Eugène Bozza, Stravinsky, Anton Reicha and Debussy, and was joined by flutist Julius Baker on Schmidt's arrangement of Daphnis et Chloé by Ravel and Kenneth Cooper's arrangement of G. F. Handel's aria "Where'er you Walk."

The recording Eyewitness (2001) featured five contemporary works: three composed by flutist-composers Elizabeth Brown, Robert Dick and Gary Schocker, respectively, as well as an atmospheric spoken word cycle by David Alpher (with a Garrison Keillor narration) and an Eric Stokes work in which the group played with the Meridian String Quartet. Stereophile critic David Buckley contrasted the "tonal, though deliciously kaleidoscopic" quality of the collection—including Brown's cinematic and humorous, road-trip inspired "Travelogue"—with Dick's "Eyewitness," which he described as an "iconoclastic work of power and drama that shatters one's idea of the flute as a genteel instrument [with] weird breathing techniques, microtonal ear tugs, shrill, chilling chord effects and soft, flickering textures."

The ensemble's fourth recording, Flute Force (2009), featured Brown's flute and pre-recorded sound composition, "The Baths of Caracalla," and Joseph Schwantner's "Silver Halo."

== Recognition ==
Flute Force has been recognized with grants from Chamber Music America, the National Endowment for the Arts, New Music USA (formerly Meet the Composer), the New York State Council on the Arts, the New York Foundation for the Arts, the American Composers Forum and the Manhattan Community Arts Fund. The group won competition awards from Artists International Young Musicians Competition (1984) and Performers of Connecticut Young Artists Competition (1983).

== Discography ==
- Flute Force, CRI (1987)
- Pastorale, VAI (1996)
- Eyewitness, Innova (2001)
- Flute Force (2008)

=== As featured players ===
- Mozart Variations, "The Bird Catcher's Song (Der Vogelsanger)," Windham Hill (1999)
- Newman New Music, "Variations and Finale on a Theme," Newport Classic (1988)
