= Lothar Osterburg =

German-American artist and master printer

- Born: 1961 (age 64–65); Braunschweig, West Germany
- Education: Hochschule für bildende Künste Braunschweig
- Known for: Printmaking, sculpture, photography, filmmaking
- Spouse: Elizabeth Brown
- Awards: John S. Guggenheim Fellowship, American Academy of Arts and Letters, New York Foundation for the Arts
- Website: Lothar Osterburg

Lothar Osterburg (born 1961) is a German-born, New York-based artist and master printer in intaglio, who works in sculpture, photography, printmaking and video. He is best known for photogravures featuring rough small-scale models of rustic structures, water and air vessels, and imaginary cities, staged in evocative settings and photographed to appear life-size to disorienting, mysterious or whimsical effect. New York Times critic Grace Glueck writes that Osterburg's rich-toned, retro prints "conjur[e] up monumental phenomena by minimal means"; Judy Pfaff describes his work as thick with film noir–like atmosphere, warmth, reverie, drama and timelessness.

Lothar Osterburg, Entering Yesterday's City of Tomorrow, photogravure on gampi mounted, 27" x 69.5", 2011

Osterburg has received a Guggenheim Fellowship and awards from the American Academy of Arts and Letters and New York Foundation for the Arts, and his work has been acquired by the Metropolitan Museum of Art, Library of Congress and Art Institute of Chicago, among others. He has exhibited at the International Print Center New York, Peruvian North American Cultural Institute (ICPNA, Lima, Peru), Museum of Fine Arts Boston, and Center for Photography at Woodstock (CPW). As a master printer, Osterburg has worked with artists including Ida Applebroog, Lee Friedlander, Adam Fuss, David Lynch, McDermott and McGough, and Lorna Simpson. After working in Brooklyn for many years, he is now based near Red Hook, New York in the Hudson Valley and serves as Artist-in-Residence in printmaking at Bard College.

== Early life and career ==
Osterburg was born in Braunschweig, West Germany, in 1961. In his youth, he trained as a musician, playing double bass and piano, but turned to art at Hochschule für bildende Künste Braunschweig, earning a degree in printmaking and experimental filmmaking. After participating in a university exchange program in San Francisco, he immigrated to the United States in 1987 and worked as a printer at the de Soto Workshop (San Francisco) and Graphicstudio (Tampa) and as master printer at Crown Point Press in San Francisco, where he learned the process of photogravure on a project for artist Christian Boltanski.

While in the Bay Area, Osterburg produced mixed-media landscape-and-architecture works that combined black-and-white photographs, gestural abstract drawing, scraps of burnt newspapers and small, linear wire sculptures; critics such as Kenneth Baker described their suggestions of devastation, war and decay as theatrical and bleak, yet bristling with energy, like the work of Anselm Kiefer. Osterburg exhibited at Southern Exposure and the Show n' Tell and Hatley Martin galleries, as well as shows in Germany, Japan, Indonesia and the Philippines.

In 1993, Osterburg started his own print studio specializing in photogravure, which he moved to New York City in 1994 (and Brooklyn in 2003). During an artist residency at MacDowell Colony in 1996, he met his wife and future collaborator, composer Elizabeth Brown. Since moving to New York, Osterburg has exhibited at Takara Gallery (Houston, 1996–8), Moeller Fine Art (New York and Berlin, 2003–11), Highpoint Center for Printmaking (2006), Fitchburg Art Museum (2007), Lesley Heller Gallery (2009–18), and Rockland Center for the Arts, CPW and ICPNA (all 2010), among others. He has been a member of the Studio Art faculty of Bard College since 1998, and taught printmaking at Cooper Union (2002–14), Pratt Institute, Columbia University and Lacoste School of the Arts in France. He has conducted photogravure workshops at art programs and institutions throughout the United States.

Lothar Osterburg, Fram, photogravure, 15.5" x 18.5", 1997

== Work and reception ==
Osterburg's work combines the authority of photography with fanciful, rough models and real outdoor settings to create images suspended between real, imaginary and lost that obscure scale and period. He is a leading teacher and practitioner of photogravure, a 19th-century intaglio process combining printmaking and early photography techniques that was developed by Henry Fox Talbot and Karel Klíč and has remained largely unchanged and little-used. Photogravure's rich, velvety blacks, continuous infinite tonality, and sensitivity to textural effects—scratches, dust and traces resulting from Osterburg's choice to sometimes print with the backs of used copperplates—impart qualities of timelessness, poignancy, mystery and the hand-made to images.

Osterburg mines persistent images in his (and collective) memory, which he recreates in quick, intuitively built models devoid of people, stripped of superfluous detail, and made with humble, found materials: toothpicks, twigs, vegetables, glass doorknobs, broken umbrellas, books, refuse. He places the unpeopled models in carefully selected, sometimes far-flung settings (beaches, lakes or rivers, cities), then photographs them through a magnifying glass or macro lens so they appear life-size from a human vantage point, drawing viewers in as lone spectators. His subject matter has centered on moments of transit through time, space and imagination: sea, air and space vessels, books and art history, decaying and evolving urban scenes.

Lothar Osterburg, Babylon, (from the "Draw me a Planet" series), photogravure with hand-coloring, 27" x 22.5", 2008

=== Photogravures ===
In the mid-1990s, Osterburg moved into sculpture and photography via the wire models he had built for his paintings. Over the next decade, he began fleshing out incomplete but skillfully constructed miniatures out of found materials, which he staged, photographed, and printed as black-and-white photogravures. His earlier photogravures combine drama, whimsy and the mythic, depicting sea vessels in various states (Fram, 1997; Cargo Ship in Storm, 2002; Safe Harbor and Wreck of the Somerset, 2004), rickety, rustic structures (Thorn Boat Marina, 1998; Vietnamese Waterwheel, 2001), and interiors carved from bits of soap (Soap Library, 2001).

Reviews describe these images as beyond documentary or appropriated photography, baffling in their mix of mute, rough-hewn forms, deceptive composing and real settings, whose effects of mist, morning dew, fog, even wind, are captured by photogravure's infinite tonality. Works such as Tidepool Lighthouse (2000) or Floating Village in Halong Bay (2005) offer seemingly historic, rugged New England and Southeast Asian coastal scenes, only to be revealed as models resting on tidal algae or shallow pools. Others portray vaguely convincing maritime dramas, as in Shackleton (2000) or Flat Earth (2006), which depicts a boat heading into a waterfall at the end of the world. After turning to new imagery for a decade, Osterburg returned to the sea in the show "Waterline" (2018), referencing rising seas, historic floods and geologic change through photogravures of imperiled boats and an installation of boat models, hung hip-high along an imaginary waterline.

In the early 2000s, Osterburg also explored images of flight (Zeppelin over Timbuktu, 2003; Channel Crossing with Hot Air Balloon, 2005). Art Newspaper critic Sarah Douglas noted such works for the "humble strangeness" of their construction and dust-marked, scratched surfaces, which she compared to silent film stills or the "delightfully eerie" films of the Brothers Quay. Osterburg's flight interests culminated in images of ancient-yet-futuristic vessels and spacecraft hovering over shadowy shanty and shack cities in his show, "Strangely Familiar" (2006, Highpoint Center), and his series of planets populated by gigantically scaled boats, bridges and condominiums (e.g., Babylon, 2008), which were inspired by Antoine de Saint-Exupéry's The Little Prince.

=== New media collaborations ===
Osterburg expanded into new media through collaborations with his wife, composer Elizabeth Brown, beginning in 2003. The video Watermusic (2004) joins Osterburg's imagery (including photogravures) of an ice-bound ship with music by Brown featuring the Theremin. Osterburg created video projections for Brown's chamber opera, Rural Electrification (2006)—which explores the effects of the advent of electricity on a young rural woman—and for her guitar-and-Theremin work, Atlantis (2008). They developed the multimedia chamber opera A Bookmobile for Dreamers (Lincoln Center, 2013) during a Bogliasco Foundation residency; the dreamlike meditation on books, reading, libraries, culture and imagination combines live Theremin, recorded soundscape and Osterburg's imagery of a bookmobile making its rounds and offering entry into various worlds through books. Brown also wrote music for videos in Osterburg's later projects Piranesi and Babel, which were presented in conjunction with live performances.

Lothar Osterburg, The Tower of Babel, wood, cardstock and book pages, dimensions varying, 7' x 7' x 28', 2017. Installation at the Esther Massry Gallery, Albany, New York.

=== Later projects ===
Osterburg's later projects have increasingly explored imaginary architecture and cities inspired by speculation and memories of art, fiction, travel and reminiscences. This work freely mixes eras and styles to create fantastical, timeless forms and parallel "what-if" histories. Piranesi (2008–10, comprising a model, prints and stop-action video) was inspired by 18th-century printmaker Giovanni Battista Piranesi's Carceri etchings of imaginary subterranean prisons; its theatrical scene features a vaulted ceiling, stone-like towers, elaborate winding stairs and drawbridges, and crude machinery. Reviews compare the work to the mise en scène of early silent films, such as F. W. Murnau's Nosferatu, which conveyed passages of gothic narrative in their detail and expressiveness.

Osterburg repurposed parts of Piranesi in his "Alternative Brooklyn" photogravures—imaginative amalgams of classical forms, New York City anachronisms and modern elements, such as Vaulted Trailer Park and Downtown Transfer (both 2010), which depict mobile homes and elevated trains emerging out of dungeons, or Squatters (2010), which positions all three elements in a Manhattan-like cityscape. Boston Globe critic Mark Feeney characterized the incongruous images as "marvels of deadpan hilarity"; others write that they grapple with the vulnerability of cities to change, simultaneously suggesting alternate histories and future archaeological excavations of contemporary civilization.

Osterburg extended these themes with "Yesterday's Cities of Tomorrow," seeking to capture the mythical, longed for, and sometimes fantastical New York City imagined by Ellis Island immigrants or encountered in old books and movies. The series mixes history (old locomotives, zeppelins, mid-century cars, expressway on-ramps), fantasy, and familiar landmarks (the Brooklyn Bridge and Flatiron Building, elevated trains) in photogravures such as Twilight, 1984 (2011) and Night (2012); Zeppelins docking at Grand Central (2013), described in The New Criterion as a remarkable "steampunk" image, was featured with its playful model in the MTA Arts show "On Time/Grand Central at 100."

Two series celebrating the printed word and cultural diversity grew out of A Bookmobile for Dreamers. "Library Dreams" consists of photogravures of child-like wonder—bookmobiles, a locomotive bursting into a library (referencing Magritte's Time Transfixed), or Literary City (2013), a book city floated on the East River and shot in scale against the Manhattan skyline. "Babel" includes photogravures, a stop-motion video, and the giant (28 feet in a 2017 installation) model Tower of Babel; influenced by Bruegel's The Tower of Babel works, the spiraling sculpture built entirely from old books (in 25 languages, found in Brooklyn) dwarfs a model modern metropolis and is surrounded by floating dirigibles and satellites.

== Awards and public collections ==
Osterburg has been recognized with fellowships from the John Simon Guggenheim Memorial Foundation (2010) and New York Foundation for the Arts (2009, 2003) and awards from the International Fine Print Dealer's Association (2018), American Academy of Arts and Letters (2010), and AEV Foundation (2009), among others. He has received artist residencies from Cill Rialaig (Ireland), Navigation Press, the Bogliasco Foundation (Italy), Hui No'eau Arts Center, MacDowell Colony and the Virginia Center for the Creative Arts.

His work belongs to the public collections of the Metropolitan Museum of Art, Library of Congress, New York Public Library, The Art Institute of Chicago, The British Museum, the China Printmaking Museum, Chazen Museum of Art, the Herzog Anton Ulrich Museum (Germany), Museum of Contemporary Photography, Museum of Fine Arts, Houston, Museum of Fine Arts, Boston, and Spencer Museum of Art, among others.
