= Gene Gutchë =

German composer

Gene Gutchë (born Romeo Maximilian Eugene Ludwig Gutschë; 3 July 1907, Berlin – 15 November 2000, White Bear Lake, Minnesota) was a German composer active primarily in the United States.

Gutchë earned degrees in business and economics but also studied piano with Ferruccio Busoni. In 1925 he moved to the U.S., working in both fields. In the 1950s he attended graduate school in music at the University of Minnesota and the University of Iowa, studying under Philip Greeley Clapp and settling in Minneapolis. He withdrew his early compositions at this time. While much of his work is neo-Romantic, he also experimented with polytonality, serialism, and microtones.

Gutchë also published two books, Music of the People (1968) and Come Prima (1970).

== Selected works ==
Orchestra

- Symphony No.1
- Symphony No.2 for chorus and orchestra, Op.14 (1951)
- Symphony No.3, Op.19
- Rondo Capriccioso, Op.21
- Dance Suite, Op.26 No.2
- Rhapsody, Op.26 No.3
- Holofernes Overture, Op.27 No.1 (1958)
- Judith Prologue, Op.27 No.2
- Concertino, Op.28 (1956)
- Symphony No.4 in one movement, Op.30 (1960)
- Symphony No.5 for string orchestra, Op.34 (1962)
- Bongo Divertimento, Op.35 (1965, revised 1993)
- Genghis Khan for winds and double basses, Op.37 (1963)
- Raquel, Op.38 (1967)
- Rites in Tenochtitlan, Op.39 No.1
- Hsiang Fei, Op.40 (1965)
- Gemini, Op.41 (1965)
- Aesop Fabler Suite, Op.43 (1967)
- Classic Concerto, Op.44 (1967)
- Symphony No.6, Op.45 (1970)
- Epimetheus USA, Op.46 (1969)
- Cybernetics XX, Op.47 (1972)
- Icarus, Op.48 (1975)
- Bi-Centurion, Op.49 (1975)
- Perseus and Andromeda XX, Op.50 (1977)
- Helios Kinetic, Op.52 (1978)

Concertante

- Concerto for piano and orchestra, Op.24
- Timpani Concertante, Op.31 (1963)
- Cantilena for horn and string orchestra (1950)
- Concerto for violin and orchestra, Op.36 (1962)

Chamber music

- String Quartet No.1 in E minor (1949)
- String Quartet in C minor, Op.12 No.1 (1950)
- String Quartet No.3, Op.12 No.3 (1951)
- Interlude for viola and piano, Op.25 (1956)
- String Quartet No.4, Op.29 No.1 (1960, revised 1982)
- String Quartet, Op.29 No.4
- Etude for Unaccompanied Cello, Op.42 (1966)

Piano

- Two Part Invention (1947)
- Fugue in C minor, Op.3 (1948)
- Theme and Variations, Op.6 No.2 (1949)
- Sonata, Op.6 No.3 (1963)
- Utilitarian Fugue, Op.9
- Sonata, Op.32 No.1 (1963)
- Sonata, Op.32 No.2 (1963)

Vocal

- Benediction for soprano and organ (1961)
- Lullaby for soprano and piano (1963)

Choral

- No Greater Love Has Man Than Mighty God Above, Hymn
- Alleluia, Op.33 (1961)
- Akhenaten (Eidetic Images) for tenor solo, chorus and orchestra, Op.51 No.2 (1978)
- Tibi Seris Tibi Metis, Op. 53 (1988–1989)
