= Philip Greeley Clapp =

American conductor and educator (1888–1954)

Philip Greeley Clapp (August 4, 1888 in Boston – April 9, 1954) was an American educator, conductor, pianist, and composer of classical music.

He served as Director of the School of Music at the University of Iowa for more than three decades (1919–1953), helping to establish that school's strong reputation in music and in the arts overall. He worked especially hard in advocating that music and the other arts should be an integral part of a liberal arts education, and succeeded in creating strong graduate programs that awarded degrees not just in scholarship and research but also in performance and creation. Among his students was Gene Gutchë.

As a composer, Clapp followed firmly in the line of Romantic and Impressionist works created by Wagner, Mahler, Strauss and Debussy (Holcomb and Meckna 2001), as well as perhaps Liszt, and others, but adding his own distinctly American style and ideas about orchestration. Although a number of his compositions were never performed, several of his twelve symphonies were premiered by major orchestras and conductors, including Dimitri Mitropoulos and the New York Philharmonic, who gave the first public performance of the Eighth Symphony in Carnegie Hall on February 7, 1952 (Downes 1952). Karl Muck arranged for him to conduct the world premieres of his First and Third Symphonies with the Boston Symphony Orchestra (Holcomb and Meckna 2001).

== Writings ==
- 1916. "Sebastian Bach, Modernist". The Musical Quarterly 2, no. 2 (April): 295–313.

== Sources ==
- Calmer, Charles Edward. 1992. "Philip Greeley Clapp: The Later Years (1909–54)". Ph.D. diss. Iowa City: University of Iowa.
- Downes, Olin. 1952. "Clapp Symphony Introduced Here: Composer's Eighth Is Offered by Mitropoulos on Return to the Philharmonic". New York Times (8 February): 18.
- Harper, Earl Enyeart. 1954. "Moral and Spiritual Values in Music Education". Music Educators Journal 40, no. 6 (June–July): 13–15, 56–57.
- Holcomb, Dorothy Regina. 1972. "Philip Greeley Clapp: his Contribution to the Music of America". Ph.D. diss. Iowa City: University of Iowa.
- Holcomb, Dorothy Regina, and Michael Meckna. 2001. "Clapp, Philip Greeley". The New Grove Dictionary of Music and Musicians, second edition, edited by Stanley Sadie and John Tyrrell. London: Macmillan Publishers.
- Kleinknecht, Daniel. 1993. "A Chant of Darkness". American Choral Review 35, no. 1 (Winter–Spring):3–4.
- Zank, Margaret Jean Porter. 1989. "Compositional Practices in Selected Symphonies of P. G. Clapp". D.A. diss. Greeley: University of Northern Colorado.
