= John Morton (composer) =

American composer (born 1954)

John Morton (born 1954) is an American composer.

Morton is best known for his use and manipulations of music boxes and their sounds. This may be compared to Conlon Nancarrow's use of the player piano and John Cage's use of the prepared piano. Born in Los Angeles, he studied privately with David Sheinfeld in San Francisco and then attended the California Institute of the Arts, where he studied with Morton Subotnick and Lucky Mosko. In summer 2009 he created the Sound Tunnel in New York City's Central Park.
