= P. Q. Phan =

Vietnamese composer

P. Q. Phan (Vietnamese: Phan Quang Phục), (born 1962 in Da Nang, South Vietnam) is a Vietnamese composer of contemporary classical music living in the United States. He became interested in music while studying architecture in 1978 and taught himself to play the piano, compose, and orchestrate. In 1982, he immigrated to the United States and began his formal musical training.

== Early life and training ==
Phan holds a B.M. from the University of Southern California (1987), and an M.M. (1989), M.A. (1993), and D.M.A. (1993) from the University of Michigan. He has taught at the University of Illinois at Urbana–Champaign and Cleveland State University. He is currently a professor of composition at the Jacobs School of Music at Indiana University Bloomington.

== Career ==
Phan's music has been performed throughout the United States, Canada, Mexico, in Europe (England, France, Austria, Italy, Holland, Norway, Germany, Belgium, Spain, Estonia, Lithuania, Russia, and Denmark), Israel, Turkey, Australia, New Zealand, China, Hong Kong(China), Singapore, Korea, and Japan.

He has received numerous commissions, including from the Kronos Quartet, the American Composers Orchestra, the Cleveland Chamber Symphony, the Greater East Lansing Symphony, Obscura Trio, Ensemble Alternance de Paris, Core Ensemble, the Pittsburgh New Music Ensemble, etc.

His works had been performed by the Kronos Quartet, the BBC Scottish Symphony Orchestra, the Radio France, Ensemble Moderne, the Cincinnati Orchestra, Seattle Symphony Orchestra, the American Composers Orchestra, the St. Louis Orchestra – Chamber Group, the Cleveland Chamber Symphony, the Charleston Symphony, the Greater East Lansing Symphony, the Sinfonia da Camera, Pittsburgh New Music Ensemble, and the Society for New Music.

He was guest composer at several music festivals, including Asian Music Week 2000, the ’99 Asian New Music Festival in Tokyo, the New Music Festival at Hamilton College (New York) in April '97 and April '99, the '96 residency with the Kronos Quartet at University of Iowa – Hancher Auditorium, 1995 Asian Composers' Forum in Sendai, Japan, the '94 New Music Festival at University of California, Santa Barbara, the '92 Music Lives in Pittsburgh.

His opera The Tale of Lady Thị Kính, based on the Vietnamese legend Quan Âm Thị Kính, premiered in February 2014 at the Indiana University Musical Arts Center.

His recorded works include Tragedy at the Opera ("Kronos Quartet: 25 Years", Nonesuch 19504), Nights of Memory for solo guitar (Michael McCormick, Plaxton – CD001, L.A., 1992), and a new CD titled Banana Trumpet Games (includes Unexpected Desire, Banana Trumpets Games, My Language, Rough Trax, Beyond the Mountains, and Rock Blood) on CRI-CD849.

== Awards ==
- 1998 Rome Prize
- Rockefeller Foundation Grant
- Meet the Composers: Music Alive Residency Award with the American Composers Orchestra
- ASCAP Standard Awards
- Ohio Arts Council Individual Artist Fellowships
- Charles Ives Center for American Music, Concordia Orchestra
- MacDowell Colony residency
