= Barton McLean =

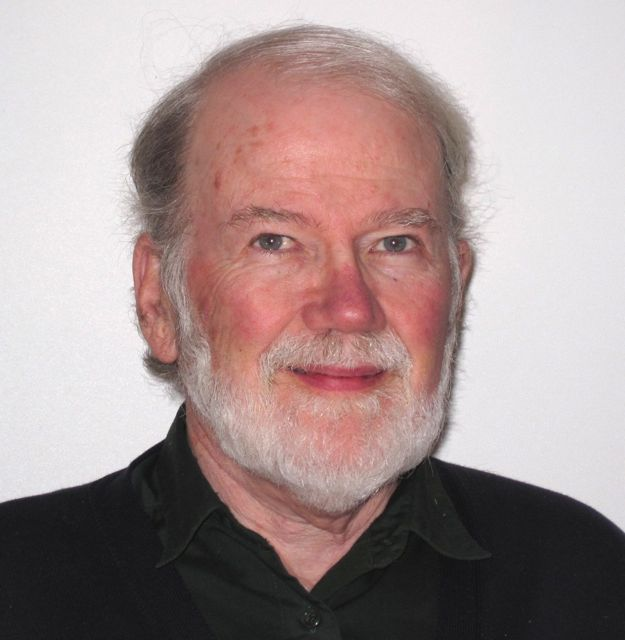

Background information
- Born: April 8, 1938 (age 88); Poughkeepsie, New York
- Occupation: Composer
- Website: Official website

Barton McLean (born 8 April 1938) is an American composer, performer, music reviewer, and writer.

== Life ==
Barton McLean was born in Poughkeepsie, New York, the son of John and Grace McLean, on April 8, 1938. He graduated from State University of New York (SUNY) Potsdam (BS 1960), Eastman School of Music (MM 1965), where he was a student of Henry Cowell, and Indiana University (DMA 1972). He taught music theory and double bass at SUNY (1960–66), while performing on double bass in jazz groups and the Hudson Valley Philharmonic Orchestra. From 1969–76 he taught music composition and theory at Indiana University South Bend. From 1969–76 he directed the Electronic Music Center at the University of Texas at Austin. In 1967 he married fellow composer Priscilla Taylor, and by 1974 they began professional touring as The McLean Mix, presenting their electro-acoustic music, which became a full-time occupation by 1983.

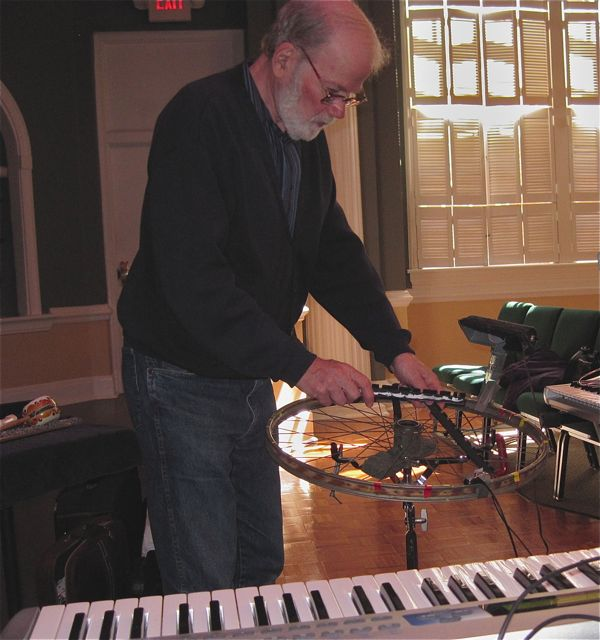
Barton McLean setting up bicycle wheel

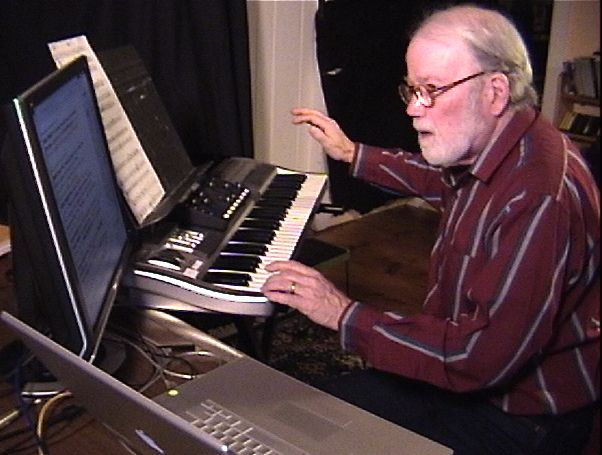
Barton McLean in performance

He created a series of solo instrument and stereo tape pieces, best known of which is Dimensions II (1974), championed by pianist David Burge, who performed it extensively for several years. Another extensively performed set in this series, Dimensions III and IV for saxophone and stereo tape (1979) was premiered by Albert Regni in concert at the University of Texas at Austin on November 15, 1979, and recorded by Regni on CRI Records in 1980, and is still actively performed today.

Created with a National Endowment for the Arts Composer Grant, McLean's Song of the Nahuatl, an electronic composition for eight channels of sound, was premiered at the University of Miami on March 24, 1978. The Electric Sinfonia, an electronic work which uses a 16-tone octave scale, won an award at the International Bourges, France Electro-acoustic Music Festival in June 1983. Along with many electronic works composed over the years, Barton McLean also developed the concept of the audience interacting intricately with instruments and live electronics in several installations.

McLean's music is often based upon processes and sounds of the natural world, while using current electronic and recording technology. The result is considered to have both primitive and sophisticated elements. Barton McLean's signature work is the audience-interactive installation RAINFOREST, created in collaboration with wife and composer Priscilla McLean. It was staged and performed throughout the USA, Canada, Europe, UK, Australia, New Zealand, and Southeast Asia from 1989 until 2013. In a darkened room a taped drone of recorded and synthesizer sounds and continuous projections of rainforest images provided an atmosphere in which members of the public were invited to perform vocally with microphones and on electronic and acoustic instruments.

In 1994, McLean was awarded a New York State Council for the Arts grant to create an installation with a nostalgic Ray Bradbury feel, portraying the ancestors of the tiny village of Petersburgh, New York. Using blown-up photographs and stations set up with recorded speaking voices, instruments, and electronic sounds, Forgotten Shadows was premiered in the Veterans Memorial Hall, Petersburgh, on Oct. 14, 1994. The music was made into a recording that is unique to McLean's style. A new direction in McLean's composing using a computer program written in Cycling '74 software Max/MSP allowed for the creation of Magic at Xanadu (MAX), inspired by the Coleridge poem "Kubla Khan" and performed live on keyboards and computer by Barton McLean. Magic at Xanadu (MAX) was recorded at the Knickerbocker Theatre in Holland, Michigan in 2008 and became a feature of The McLean Mix tours through 2010. Currently, McLean is composing with and developing concepts on the Kyma system provided by Symbolic Sound.

The McLean Mix performed from 1974 to 2013, presenting their separate works and collaborations across the USA and internationally; in these concerts he played the piano or synthesizer, plus woodwinds, amplified bicycle wheel, invented instruments, percussion, and digital processors. The McLeans live in Petersburgh, New York.

== Awards ==
- 1975–95 fifty five Meet the Composer Grants from MTC New York, New England, Midwest, Mid-America, Texas, West, and California during McLean Mix touring
- 1976 National Endowment for the Arts Media Arts Grant
- 1981 Dimensions III chosen as the American representative of the UNESCO-International Music Council-Rostrum International Festival
- 1976, 1982 National Endowment for the Arts Composer Fellowships
- 1979, 1981, 1983, 1985, 2002 MacDowell Colony Fellowships
- 1983 The Electric Sinfonia awarded prize at International Bourges, France Electroacoustic Music Festival
- 1986 Leighton Colony, Banff, Alberta, Centre for the Arts Fellowship
- 1986 New York Foundation for the Arts Composer Fellowship
- 1990, 1994 NYSCA Decentralization Grants for multimedia installations
- 1996 Universiti Malaysia Sarawak Research Grant for Borneo media installation
- 1996, 2000 Virgil Thompson Foundation (for CRI Recordings)
- 1997: Asian Cultural Council (residency with Asian Composers League in Manila, Philippines)
- 2004 American Music Center Composer Award
- 2010 New York Foundation for the Arts Fellows/Innova Award for complete CD production
- 2011 NYSCA Community Arts Grant for audio/video production of Peter's People, Creating the Dream

== Discography ==
- Barton McLean, Orion Records ORS 75192, 1973
- American Contemporary—Electronic Music, Composers Recordings, Inc SD 335, 1975
- American Contemporary—David Burge and Lois Svard Burge, pianists, Composers Recordings, Inc 407, 1979
- American Society of University Composers, Advance FGR-25S (LP), 1979
- McLean: Electro-Symphonic Landscapes, Folkways Records (later Smithsonian) FTS 33450 (LP), 1979
- Electronic Music from the Outside In, Folkways Records (later Smithsonian) FPX 36050 (LP), 1980
- Music of a Timeless Earth. Folkways Records (later Smithsonian) FTS-33875 (LP), 1980
- American Contemporary—Extended Saxophone — Albert Regni, Composers Recordings, Inc 431, 1980
- Computer Music from the Outside In, Folkways Records (later Smithsonian) FSS-37465 (LP), 1983
- Electro-Surrealistic Landscapes, Opus One Records Stereo 96 (LP), 1986
- CDCM Computer Music Series Vol. 7, Centaur Records CRC 2047 (CD), 1990
- Rainforest Images, Capstone Records (Parma) CPS-8617 CD, 1993, re-released 2011
- Gods, Demons and the Earth, Capstone Records (Parma) CPS 8622-CD, 1995
- The McLean Mix & the Golden Age of Electronic Music. Composers Recordings Inc (New World) CD 764. 1997
- The Electric Performer, Capstone Records (Parma) CPS-8637 CD, 1997
- Forgotten Shadows, Composers Recordings, Inc (CRI) CRI 846, 2000
- McLean Mix Live!, MLC Publications (DVD), 2009
- The McLeans Mix Three—3 Collaborations, MLC Publications (DVD), 2009
- Barton & Priscilla McLean: Electronic Landscapes, EM Records, Japan, EM 1060 CD, 2009
- Soundworlds, Innova Recordings 234 (CD), 2010
- Peter's People — Creating the Dream, MLC Publications (DVD), 2011

== Works ==
- Fantasia for Piano, 1968
- Genesis, electronic, 1973
- Spirals, electronic, 1974
- Dimensions II, for piano and recorded sound, 1974
- Song of the Nahuatl, electronic, 1976
- The Sorcerer Revisited, electronic, 1975, rev.1980
- Dimensions III and IV, for saxophone and recorded sound, 1979
- A Lecture, speech improvisation featuring Trevor Wishart, with electronics, 1982
- Etunytude, electronic, 1982
- In Wilderness is the Preservation of the World for live performance, choir, narrators, soloists, taped wolves and eskimos, electronic sounds, audience singing, 1983
- Pathways for symphonic winds and percussion, 1983
- Rainforest, collaborative installation with Priscilla McLean for five performance stations, digital processing, recorded sound, and slides/video, 1989
- Visions of a Summer Night, electronic suite in 5 movements, 1989
- Himalayan Fantasy, electronic, 1992
- Rainforest Images I collaboration with Priscilla McLean, electronic, using rainforest sounds from 3 continents, 1993
- Rainforest Images II, collaboration with Priscilla McLean and Hasnul Jamal Saidon, music and video, 1994
- Earth Music, live electronics with 2 performers, 1993
- Jambori Rimba, collaboration with Priscilla McLean for live performers and electronics, 1997
- Happy Days, for live electronics using music boxes, keyboards, flexatones, party instruments, acting,1997
- Forgotten Shadows, electronic collage using old time songs and instruments, 1998
- Ritual of the Dawn, for 6 piece chamber ensemble, 1998
- Rainforest Reflections for orchestra, tape, two soloists, 1999
- Rhapsody on a Desert Spring for MIDI violin, live performance with Korg Wavestation, 1999
- Journey on a Long String, electronic, 2001
- MILLing in the ENNIUM, electronic collage from installation of the same name, 2001
- Magic at Xanadu, (MAX) live computer performance with MA/MSP, 2008
- Concerto: States of Being, for piano and electronics, 2009
- Ice Canyons, for live electronic performance with MAX/MSP, 2010
- Jubilee, for live computer performance with MAX/MSP, 2010
- Peter's People Suite, from video of the same name, 2012
- !metaSinfonica, electronic music produced with the Kyma system, with video enhancement, 2013
- Dreamscapes, electronic music produced with the Kyma system, with video enhancement, 2016
- Night Conjurer, electronic music produced with the Kyma system, with video enhancement, 2016
- Saxy Dreams, electronic and electroacoustic music produced with the Kyma system with video enhancement, 2017
- Electrojuice, an electronic music produced with the Kyma system, with video, 2019
- Discoveries (with selected Sounds & their VCS), with diagrams of some of the Kyma Sounds used, 2020
- Discoveries (with Timeline), Kyma Timeline, 2020
- Dusk in the Hollow, music accompanied by video images of historical Petersburgh, New York, 2020
- Pterodactyl, primeval music using Kyma and images of prehistoric birds, 2021
- Illusions, a Kyma-generated musical suite in 5 sections featuring fractal plus images of Stephen Dankner, 2021
