= Ingram Marshall =

American composer (1942–2022)

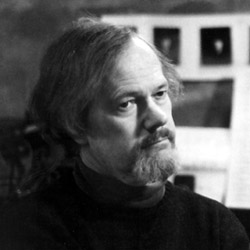
Marshall in his Hamden, CT studio.

Ingram Douglass Marshall (May 10, 1942 – May 31, 2022) was an American composer and a onetime student of Vladimir Ussachevsky and Morton Subotnick.

== Early life and education ==
Marshall was born in Mount Vernon, New York. He was the son of Bernice Douglass and Harry Reinhard Marshall, Sr. Marshall's early interest in music was the result of encouragement provided by his mother, herself an accomplished pianist and vocalist. As a youth, he performed as a soprano in the Boy's Choir at the Mt. Vernon Community Church, and during his high school years was influenced early by noted music instructor Victor Laslo. After graduating from the Fox Lane High School in 1960, he pursued musical studies at Lake Forest College and Columbia University, becoming affiliated with the Columbia-Princeton Electronic Music Center. In 1970 he became a graduate assistant to Morton Subotnick at Cal Arts, staying on to teach for several years after receiving his MFA in 1971.

== Career ==
Though the composer used the term "expressivist" to describe his music, Marshall's music is often associated with post-minimalism. His music often reflects an interest in world music, particularly Balinese gamelan tradition, as well as influence from the American minimalism trends of the 1960s (the composer often acknowledged the work of Steve Reich, Terry Riley, and John Adams).

He first gained recognition for his electroacoustic pieces, often performed by the composer himself on synthesizer, tape looping, gambuh (a traditional Balinese flute), and voice ("Fragility Cycles" [1978] is one of his best known works using this method of solo performance). His acoustic music frequently incorporated tape delay, and later, digital delay (such as "Soe Pa", for solo classical guitar, and "Hymnodic Delays" for the Theatre of Voices). Many of the tape parts of his pieces include the composer's own keening falsetto and gambuh playing (such as "Fog Tropes" and "Gradual Requiem" (1980)). Some of his works were produced in coordination with the assistance of noted Norwegian photographer, James Bengston of Studio Nord in Oslo.

Marshall wrote for the Kronos Quartet: Voces Resonae (1984) and Fog Tropes II (1982), featured in the 2010 film Shutter Island, and for the Orpheus Chamber Orchestra: Orphic Memories (2006).

He taught at the California Institute of the Arts in the early 1970s, joined the music faculty at The Evergreen State College in the late 1980s, and later moved to New Haven, Connecticut. He taught at the Yale School of Music and the Hartt School, and also held visiting teaching positions at the San Francisco Conservatory of Music and Brooklyn College. Among his notable students are Timo Andres, Armando Bayolo, Christopher Cerrone, Tyondai Braxton, Jacob Cooper, Adrian Knight, Matt Sargent, and Stephen Gorbos.

Marshall was the recipient of a Fulbright Scholarship and studied gamelan music in Bali. In 1990 he was awarded a doctorate of philosophy in music by Lake Forest College, largely in recognition of his Fulbright award and gamelan studies in Bali. In addition to his Fulbright award, he received awards from the National Endowment for the Arts, Rockefeller Foundation, Fromm Foundation, Guggenheim Foundation, and the American Academy of Arts and Letters.

== Music ==
=== Chamber works ===
- "The Fragility Cycles" (1978), electronics, synthesizer, gambuh flute, and voice
- "Gradual Requiem" (1980), electronics, synthesizer, flute, voice, mandolin, and piano
- Fog Tropes (1981), brass sextet and tape
- Voces Resonae (1984), string quartet (premiered by Kronos Quartet)
- In My End is My Beginning (1985), Piano Quartet in 2 Movements (premiered by the Dunsmuir Piano Quartet)
- Evensongs (1992), string quartet
- Fog Tropes II (1994), string quartet and tape
- Sierran Songs (1994), bass, marimba, and electronics
- In Deserto: Smoke Creek (2003), violin, bassoon, percussion, guitar, cello, and electronics
- Muddy Waters (2004), piano, percussion, electric guitar, bass, bass clarinet, and cello (premiered by Bang on a Can All-Stars)
- Sea Tropes (2007), flute, violin, cello, bass clarinet, marimba, and tape

=== Orchestral works ===
- "Spiritus" (1981)
- "Sinfonia Dolce far Niente" (1989)
- Peaceable Kingdom (1991)
- "Kingdom Come" (1997)
- Bright Kingdoms (2003)
- Dark Florescence (2004), Variations for Two Guitars and Orchestra (with Andy Summers and Ben Verdery)
- Orphic Memories (2006)

=== Choral works ===
- Savage Altars (1992), chamber choir, violin, viola, and tape
- Hymnodic Delays (2001)
- A New Haven Psalter (premiered on November 30, 2012 by the Yale University Glee Club and the Yale Concert Band)

=== Solo works ===
- Soe-pa (2000), solo guitar with electronics
- Authentic Presence (2001), solo piano (premiered by Sarah Cahill)
- September Canons (2003), solo violin (premiered by Todd Reynolds)
- Five Easy Pieces (2003), Piano four-hands
- "Baghdad Blues" (2006), solo oboe with electronics
- "Florescence Soledad" (2007), solo guitar

== Interviews ==
- Ingram Marshall (July 17, 2001). "Ingram Marshall: Today's Music Tomorrow". NewMusicBox (Interview). Interviewed by Frank J. Oteri (published August 1, 2001).
- Perfect Sound Forever: Interview by Daniel Varela (July 2003)
- "Meet The Composer: Ingram Marshall: A Connecticut Hippie In California" (Podcast). October 5, 2015.
