= Priscilla McLean =

American classical composer

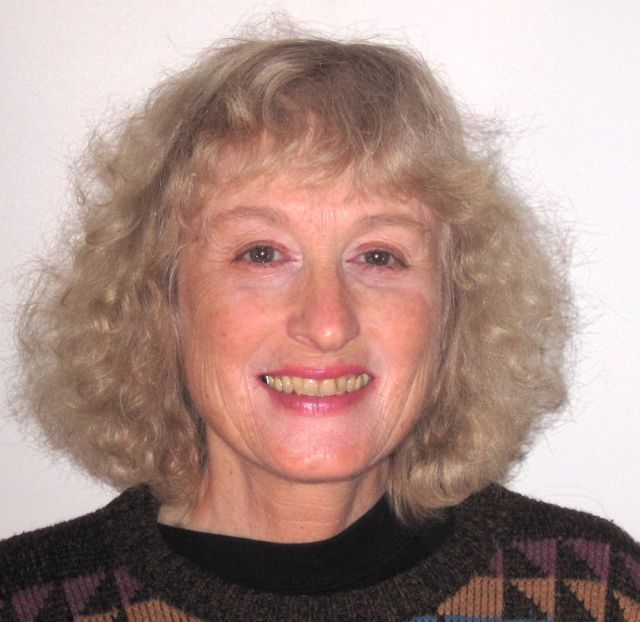
Priscilla McLean

Priscilla McLean (née Taylor; born May 27, 1942) is an American composer, performer, video artist, writer, and music reviewer.

== Life ==
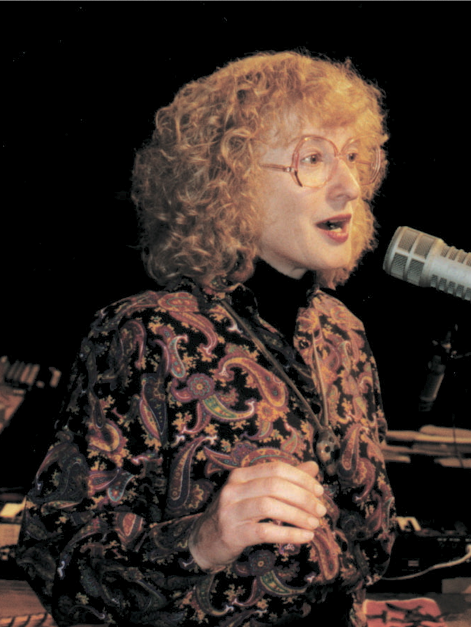
Priscilla McLean singing

Priscilla Taylor was born in Fitchburg, Massachusetts, the daughter of business manager Conrad Taylor and school teacher Grace Taylor. She graduated from Fitchburg State College, Massachusetts (BEd 1963) and the University of Massachusetts, Lowell (BME 1965). At Indiana University, Bloomington (MM 1969), she was greatly influenced by the music of Xenakis, who was teaching there. She has taught at Indiana University, Kokomo (1971–3), St. Mary's College, Notre Dame (1973–6), and the University of Hawaii (1985) and the University of Malaysia (1996). From 1976 to 1980 she produced the American Society of Composers' Radiofest series. In 1974 she and her husband, Barton McLean, began to perform together as The McLean Mix, and in 1983 to present concerts of their own music full-time. She sings with extended vocal techniques and plays the piano, synthesizer, violin, percussion, and Amerindian wooden flutes, as well as newly created instruments.

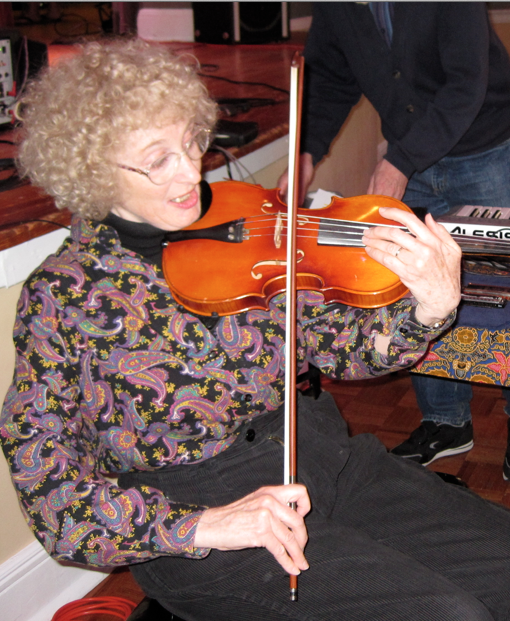
Priscilla McLean playing an altered violin

As The McLean Mix, the couple has performed throughout the United States and Europe, Southeast Asia, the United Kingdom, Canada, Australia, and New Zealand. The New Grove Dictionary of Music describes McLean's work as "[ranging] from abstract orchestral and chamber music to dramatic electro-acoustic works. Since 1978 most of her music has focused on the concept of the wilderness and has incorporated sounds from animals and nature along with synthesized music."

== Awards ==
- National Endowment for the Arts Composer Grants
- National Endowment for the Arts Media Arts Grant
- Martha Baird Rockefeller Grant
- 1989 UNESCO International Composers Rostrum, for international broadcast of Voices of the Wild, Albany Symphony, Julius Hedgi, Conductor

== Discography ==
- American Society of University Composers, Advance Recordings FGR-19S (LP), 1976
- American Contemporary—Electronic Music, CRI SD 335 (LP), 1975 (Now available on New World Records)
- McLean: Electro-Symphonic Landscapes, Folkways Records (later Smithsonian) FTS 33450 (LP), 1979
- Electronic Music from the Outside In, Folkways Records (later Smithsonian) FPX 36050 (LP), 1980
- The McLean Mix—Electro-Surrealistic Landscapes, Opus One Records #96(LP), 1986
- Variations and Mosaics on a Theme of Stravinsky, Louisville Orchestra First Edition Records, LS 762 (LP), 1979
- Rainforest Images, Capstone Records (Parma) CPS-8617 CD, 1993
- Gods, Demons, and the Earth, Capstone Records (Parma) CPS-8622 CD, 1995
- The Electric Performer, Capstone Records (Parma) CPS-8637 CD, 1997
- The McLean Mix & The Golden Age of Electronic Music, CRI (New World) CD 764, 1997
- Vocal Music of Priscilla McLean, Capstone Records (Parma) CPS-8663 CD, 1999
- Barton and Priscilla McLean—Electronic Landscapes, EM Records, Japan, EM 1059 CD, 2006
- McLean Mix Live!, MLC Publications DVD, 2009
- Priscilla McLean—Symphony of Seasons, MLC Publications DVD, 2009
- The McLeans Mix Three, MLC Publications DVD, 2009
- Cries and Echoes, MLC Publications DVD, 2011
- Peter's People—Creating the Dream, MLC Publications DVD, 2012
- Music From the Sounds of Earth, Centaur Records, Inc., CRC 3249 (CD), 2013

== Selected works ==
- Rainer Maria Rilke Poems: Three Songs for Soprano Voice and Violin, 1967
- Lighting Me as a Match for tenor voice, violin, horn, piano, percussion, 1968
- Interplanes for two pianos, 1971
- Night Images, electronic, 1973
- Dance of Dawn, electronic, 1974
- Variations and Mosaics on a Theme of Stravinsky for orchestra, 1975
- Messages for chorus, four soloists, chamber ensemble, 1975
- Ah-Syn! for autoharp processed through Arp 2600 synthesizer, 1976
- Invisible Chariots, electronic, 1977
- Fire & Ice for tenor/bass trombone and prepared piano, 1977
- Beneath the Horizon I for processed whale songs and tuba quartet, 1978
- Beneath the Horizon III for processed whale songs and solo tuba, 1979
- Fantasies for Adults and Other Children, eight pieces for soprano, piano and two performers, 1980
- The Inner Universe, five pieces for prepared piano and recorded sound 1982
- O Beautiful Suburbia! for soprano voice, autoharp or zither, narrator, amplified bicycle wheel and recorded sound, 1984
- A Magic Dwells for orchestra and recorded sound, 1986
- Elan! A Dance to all Rising Things from the Earth for flute, violin, violoncello, piano, and percussion, 1984
- Invocation for hybrid clarinet and soprano recorders, chorus, percussion, amplified bicycle wheel, and recorded sound, 1985
- On Wings of Song for soprano voice, amplified bicycle wheel, and recorded sound, 1985
- Wilderness for soprano voice, chamber ensemble, and recorded sound, 1988
- In Celebration for chorus, piano, percussion, and recorded sound, 1988
- Rainforest, collaborative installation with Barton McLean for five performance stations, digital processing, recorded sound, and slides/video, 1989
- Voices of the Wild for symphony orchestra and recorded sound, 1989, rev. 2011
- The Dance of Shiva, electronic, with fade and dissolve slides/video, 1990
- Wilderness for soprano voice, flexatone, and recorded sound, 1990
- Flight Beyond, electronic, 1990
- Everything Awakening Alert and Joyful! for narrator and orchestra, 1992
- Sage Songs About Life! (and Thyme...) for soprano voice and piano, 1992
- Rainforest Images, collaboration with Barton McLean, electronic, 1993
- Where the Wild Geese Go for B♭ clarinet and recorded sound, 1994
- Rainforest Images II, collaboration with Barton McLean and Hasnul Jamal Saidon, music and video, 1994
- In the Beginning for soprano voice, digital and video processors, recorded sounds, 1995
- Jambori Rimba, collaboration with Barton Mclean for soprano voice, processors, soprano recorder, percussion, recorded sound, and video by Hasnul Jamal Saidon, 2000
- Jambori Rimba, collaborative installation with Barton McLean and Hasnul Jamal Saidon for five electroacoustic stations, recorded sound, video, slides, and dance, 1997
- Desert Spring, collaborative installation with Barton McLean for five electroacoustic stations, recorded sound, American desert slides, 1997
- Desert Voices for Zeta midi violin, digital processor, and recorded sound, 1999
- The Ultimate Symphonius 2000, collaborative installation with Barton McLean for eight electroacoustic stations, recorded sound, video, slides, and dance, 2000
- Angels of Delirium, electronic, 2001
- Symphony of Seasons: Jewels of January and The Eye of Spring, electronic music and video, 2001
- MILLing in the ENNIUM, electronic music, Barton McLean, and video, Priscilla McLean, 2001
- Symphony of Seasons: Autumn Requiem, collaboration with Barton McLean for electroacoustic music ensemble and video by Priscilla McLean, 2002
- Symphony of Seasons: July Dance, electronic music and video, 2003
- Xaakalawe/Flowing, electronic music and video, 2004
- Snowburst Songs: Four Haiku for Winter for soprano voice and piano, 2004
- Cyberlament, electronic music, 2005
- Caverns of Darkness, Rings of Light for solo tuba, recorded tubas, and video, 2007
- Natural Energy, music collaboration with Barton McLean for electroacoustic music ensemble, and video by Priscilla McLean, 2008
- Cries and Echoes for solo violoncello, recorded celli, and video, 2009
- Peter's People: Creating the Dream, collaboration with Barton McLean, video featuring interviewed artists and original music, 2012
- Pilgrimage, electronic music, 2015
- Songs of Radiance: Softly the Morning's Radiance, There Was a Time, and Time is But the Stream, electroacoustic music, 2016
- Caribbean Fantasy, electroacoustic music, 2019
- Ghost Voices, electroacoustic music, 2020
- Ruckus, electroacoustic music, 2021
- Quarantined!, electroacoustic music, 2022

== Books and films ==
- Hanging Off the Edge— Revelations of a Modern Troubadour, memoir by Priscilla McLean, 279 pp, iUniverse, 2006.
- Peter's People— Creating the Dream, Priscilla and Barton McLean, film directors, 2012.
