= American Composers Alliance =

Nonprofit composer service organization

The American Composers Alliance (ACA) is an American nonprofit composer service organization dedicated to the publishing and promoting of American contemporary classical music. Founded in 1937 by Aaron Copland, Milton Adolphus, Marion Bauer and others, it is the oldest national organization of its kind, and represents over 200 member composers.

The organization is based in Manhattan, New York City, New York. From 1951 to 2012, ACA presented the Laurel Leaf Award to individuals and organizations in recognition of "distinguished achievement in fostering and encouraging American music."

The American Composers Alliance publishes musical scores under the imprint American Composers Edition (ACE). From 2001 through 2013, ACA held an annual festival of American music presenting 6-8 concerts with more than 30 composers from across the country. Past festivals received favorable reviews from The New York Times and New Music Connoisseur. In 2017, ACA celebrated its 80th anniversary.

== Affiliation ==
Composers seeking services from American Composers Alliance must be affiliated with Broadcast Music Inc. (BMI) or ASCAP. Any US citizen or US permanent resident may apply for membership. There are no stylistic requirements. The composer must be writing contemporary classical music, at a professional level.

The composer submits electronically a minimum of two recent scores, two recordings (live or studio), a complete list of works (with instrumentation, duration, and premiere performance info), along with a bio, resume, or curriculum vitae that contains performance information for the last three years. A committee from ACA's Board of Governors reviews this material and then makes a recommendation to the full Board, which determines acceptance for works into the ACA Catalog. The process can take from 2 to 3 months.

If the composer's work is accepted into the ACA Catalog, an agreement, a Grant of Rights for the selected works is signed. This Agreement gives ACA administration and publishing rights. The Agreement may be terminated by the composer or by the ACA Board of Governors with reasonable notice. Control of copyright remains with the composer.

== Affiliated composers ==
As of 2026, composers affiliated with the ACA included:

- H. Leslie Adams
- Milton Adolphus
- Bradley Albers
- Ruth Anderson
- T. J. Anderson
- Andrew Ardizzoia
- Bülent Arel
- Christopher Auerbach-Brown
- Elizabeth R. Austin
- Aaron Avshalomov
- Jacob Avshalomov
- Emil Awad
- Frederic Balazs
- James Scott Balentine
- George Barati
- Leslie Bassett
- Marion Bauer
- Ross Bauer
- James Beale
- John J. Becker
- Burton Beerman
- Jason Belcher
- Elizabeth Bell
- Jim Berenholtz
- Brian Bevelander
- Philip Bezanson
- Curtis Biggs
- Hayes Biggs
- Allan Blank
- Marilyn Bliss
- Marc Blitzstein
- Steven D. Block
- Zelman Bokser
- Elliot Borishansky
- Edith Borroff
- Will Gay Bottje
- Martin Boykan
- Daniel Brewbaker
- Jack Briece
- Jack Brimberg
- Richard Brooks
- Mark Brunswick
- Richard Cameron-Wolfe
- Thomas Canning
- Robert Carl
- Philip Carlsen
- Robert Ceely
- Ryan Chase
- Wallace McClain Cheatham
- Gerald Chenoweth
- Barney Childs
- Avery Claflin
- Sheree Clement
- Fred Cohen
- Tim Corpus
- Eleanor Cory
- Gheorghe Costinescu
- Lou Coyner
- Arthur Custer
- Joseph Dangerfield
- Matthew de Lacey Davidson
- William DeFotis
- Michael Dellaira
- Lawrence Dillon
- John Eaton
- George Edwards
- Robert Evett
- Margaret Fairlie-Kennedy
- Noel Farrand
- Peyman Farzinpour
- Vivian Fine
- Tom Flaherty
- David Froom
- Jay Anthony Gach
- Simon Henry Gale
- Gilbert Galindo
- John Grant Gibson
- Robert L. Gibson
- Miriam Gideon
- Janet Gilbert
- Albert Glinsky
- David E. Gordon
- Matthew Greenbaum
- Laura Greenberg
- Joel Gressel
- Karen Griebling
- Gregory Hall
- John Heiss
- Sydney Hodkinson
- Hubert S. Howe Jr.
- Robert Hughes
- Jere Hutcheson
- Edward S. Jacobs
- Loretta Jankowski
- Barbara Jazwinski
- David Evan Jones
- Louis Karchin
- Ulysses Kay
- Sunbin Clara Kim
- Arthur Kreiger
- Karl Kroeger
- Consuela Lee
- John Anthony Lennon
- Jorge Liderman
- Goddard Lieberson
- David Liptak
- David Lipten
- James Lovendusky
- Otto Luening
- Raymond Luedeke
- Erik Lundborg
- Robert McBride
- Richard McCandless
- Elliott Miles McKinley
- Lansing McLoskey
- Colin McPhee
- John Melby
- Sarah Meneely-Kyder
- Scott L. Miller
- Charles Mills
- Darleen Mitchell
- Douglas Moore
- Dorothy Rudd Moore
- Kermit Moore
- Walter Mourant
- Robert Max Newell
- Lewis J. Nielson
- Alison Nowak
- Harold Oliver
- Terry Winter Owens
- Daniel Perlongo
- Gary Philo
- Paul Pisk
- Quincy Porter
- Carlos Rausch
- Thomas L. Read
- Phillip Rhodes
- Wallingford Riegger
- Jody Rockmaker
- Michael S. Rothkopf
- Steven Christopher Sacco
- Allen Sapp
- Gary Schneider
- Brian Schober
- Elliott Schwartz
- Judith Shatin
- Allen Shawn
- Elna Sherman
- Alice Shields
- Marilyn Shrude
- Christopher L. Shultis
- Elie Siegmeister
- Ann Silsbee
- Michael Slayton
- Harvey Sollberger
- Glenn Stallcop
- Joel Eric Suben
- Stephen Carter Suber
- Joyce Hope Suskind
- Daniel Tacke
- Dean Taylor
- Andrew William Thomas
- Mark David Thome
- Robert Scott Thompson
- Frederick C. Tillis
- Joan Tower
- Burr Van Nostrand
- Roger C. Vogel
- Robert Ward
- Ben Weber
- Karl Weigl
- Matthew Welch
- Samuel Wellman
- Peter Westergaard
- Dolores R. White
- Beth Wiemann
- Donald M. Wilson
- Charles Wuorinen
- Rolv Yttrehus
- Noel Zahler

== See also ==
- American Composers Forum
