= Society for New Music =

- Abbreviation: SNM
- Formation: 1971; 55 years ago
- Founder: Neva Pilgrim
- Founded at: Syracuse, New York, United States
- Location(s): 438 Brookford Rd. Syracuse, NY 13224
- Coordinates: 43.035172°N 76.097489°W
- Region served: Central New York
- President: Rob Bridge
- Vice Presidents: Edward Ruchalski; David Stam
- Secretary: Jenny Doctor
- Treasurer: David Abrams
- Main organ: Executive Committee
- Website: www.societyfornewmusic.org

The Society for New Music (SNM) is a contemporary classical music organization based in Syracuse, New York. SNM presents concerts devoted entirely to contemporary music, funds commissions, produces recordings and presents awards to young composers.

== History ==
SNM was founded in 1971 by Neva Pilgrim with the main purpose of promoting contemporary music in the Central New York Region.

== Mission and Work ==
SNM commissions new works, and advocates for composers through Society News (their in-house print and digital publication) and via their radio show, Fresh Ink on WCNY-FM. SNM provides regional musicians with opportunities to perform music by their peers. Works are offered on television, radio, and live performances.

== Commissions ==
Since its inception, SNM has commissioned new works by over fifty composers from the Central New York region, including faculty from Syracuse University, the Eastman School of Music, Colgate University, Cornell University, and many other schools in the area. Many of the composers have won significant awards, such as the Pulitzer Prize in music.

=== SNM Commissioned Composers ===
- Elizabeth Alexander
- Howard Boatwright
- Paul Brantley
- Ron Caltabiano
- Ryan Chase
- Lorne Covington
- Nicholas D'Angelo
- Rob Deemer
- Joseph Downing
- Stephen Ferre
- Earl George
- Daniel Strong Godfrey
- Jorge Villavicencio Grossmann
- Sydney Hodkinson
- Christopher Hopkins
- Brian Israel
- Ping Jin
- Robert Keefe
- Sally Lamb McCune
- Paul Leary
- Greg Levin
- Malcolm Lewis
- Harris Lindenfeld
- David Liptak
- Zhuang Liu
- Marc Mellits
- Dexter Morrill
- Franklin Morris
- Robert Morris
- Mark Olivieri
- Robert Moffat Palmer
- Samuel Pellman
- Burrill Phillips
- Douglas Quin
- George Rochberg
- Christopher Rouse
- Edward Ruchalski
- Carlos Sanchez-Gutierrez
- Nicolas Scherzinger
- Roberto Sierra
- Ann Loomis Silsbee
- Rob Smith
- Steven Stucky
- Augusta Read Thomas
- Zhou Tian
- Dan Trueman
- Octavio Vazquez
- Melinda Wagner
- Gregory Wanamaker
- Richard Wernick
- James Willey
- Dana Wilson
- "Doctuh" Michael Woods
- Ricardo Zohn-Muldoon

== Recordings ==
The Society for New Music has released recordings on a variety of labels, including Innova Recordings, Composers Recordings, Inc. (CRI) and Mode Records. SNM's "American Masters for the 21st Century" on Innova currently includes five albums dedicated to music by living American composers.

== Brian Israel Prize ==
Since 1985, SNM has awarded prizes to composers under age 30. The annual award honors the memory of American composer Brian Israel "who died of leukemia at the age of 35 in 1986. He was on Syracuse University's School of Music faculty at the time of his death. During his short life, Israel championed gifted emerging composers." Winners receive performances of a chamber work, either of the work that won the award, or a different work.

=== Brian Israel Prize Winners and Honorable Mentions ===
- (2024) Winners: Sami Seif (SNM), Maxim Dybal-Denysenko (NY Federation of Music Clubs) Honorable Mention: Yuxuan Lin, Rolando J. Goméz
- (2023) Winners: Daniel Reza Sabzghabaei (SNM), Benjamin Rieke (NY Federation of Music Clubs) Honorable Mention: Johnny Macmillan, Talia Berenbaum, Arjan Singh Dogra
- (2019) Winners: Julian Bennett Holmes (SNM), Paul Edward Frucht (NY Federation of Music Clubs) Honorable Mention: Tomek Arnold, Flannery Cunningham, Jonathan Rainous, Zoe Yucong Wang
- (2018) Winners: Jack Freyer (SNM), Saad Haddad (NY Federation of Music Clubs) Honorable Mention: Douglas Hertz, Noah Kahrs, Michael Seltenreich
- (2017) Winners: Alex Stephenson (SNM), Simon Frisch (NY Federation of Music Clubs) Honorable Mention: James Budinich
- (2016) Winners: Ryan Chase (SNM), Kaito Nakahori (NY Federation of Music Clubs), Honorable Mentions: Charles Peck, Zachary Sheets
- (2015) Winners: Alex Burtzos (SNM), Scott Etan Feiner (NY Federation of Music Clubs); Honorable Mentions: Bin David Li, J. P. Redmond
- (2014) Winners: John Liberatore (SNM), Michael Boyman (NY Federation of Music Clubs); Honorable Mentions: JunYi Chow, Ross Scott Griffey
- (2013) Winners: Juan Pablo Contreras (SNM), Amit Menahem Gilutz (NY Federation of Music Clubs); Honorable Mentions: Eric Allen, Ross Scott Griffey, Nathan Heidelberger
- (2012) Winners: Ted Goldman (SNM), Joseph Nathaniel Rubinstein (NY Federation of Music Clubs); Honorable Mentions: Amit Menahem Gilutz, Justin Paul Jaramillo, Brandon Luis Ridenour, Haralabos [Harry] Stafylakis
- (2011) Winners: Thomas H. Healy (SNM), Bret Bohman (NY Federation of Music Clubs); Honorable Mentions: Evan Antonellis, Thomas Arthur Murphy, Jessica Lynn Rudman
- (2010) Winners: Michael Gilbertson (SNM), Chris Rogerson (NY Federation of Music Clubs); Honorable Mentions: Evan Antonellis, Lembit Lepasaar Beecher
- (2009) Winners: David Crowell (SNM), Samson Young (NY Federation of Music Clubs); Honorable Mention: Evan Antonellis, Matthew Barson, Elizabeth Lim
- (2008) Winners: Baljinder Singh Sekhon (SNM), Eleanor Aversa (NY Federation of Music Clubs), Andy Akiho (SNM 3rd Prize); Honorable Mentions: Dillon Kondor, Gity Razaz, David Salvage, Sheridan Seyfried, Sundar Subramanian, Daniel Wohl, Scott Wollschleger
- (2007): Winners: Nicholas Omiccioli (SNM), Eric Nathan (NY Federation of Music Clubs); Honorable Mentions: Eleanor Aversa, Ryan Carter, Jeff Myers, Gity Razaz, Shogo Samata
- (2006): Winners: Christopher Doll (SNM), Ryan Gallagher (NY Federation of Music Clubs); Honorable Mentions: John Paul Brabant, Chris Rogerson, Robert Singley
- (2005) Winners: Patrick Castillo (SNM), Eric Schwartz (NY Federation of Music Clubs); Honorable Mention: Christopher Tignor
- (2004) Winners: Adam Schoenberg (SNM), Jesse Wright-Fitzgerald (NY Federation of Music Clubs); Honorable Mentions: John Arrigo-Nelson, Vera Ivanova, Peter Kim
- (2003) Winners: Evan Johnson (SNM), Philip Rothman (NY Federation of Music Clubs)
- (2002) Winner: Huang Ruo
- (2001) Winner: Winnie Wing-Yee Cheung
- (2000) Winner: Mark Dennis McConnell
- (1999) Winner: Robert Paterson
- (1998) Winner: Damon Lee
- (1997) Winner: Derek Bermel; Honorable Mention: Ann Lathan Kerzner
- (1996) Winner: Yuzuru Sadashige
- (1995) Winner: Anna Weesner
- (1994) Winner: Michael Sidney Timpson
- (1993) Winner: Sally Lamb McCune; Honorable Mention: David Lefkowitz
- (1992) Winner: Michele Frida Green; Honorable Mention: David Lefkowitz
- (1991) Winner: Kent Marks; Honorable Mention: Nolan Gasser
- (1990) Winner: Alton Howe Clingan; Honorable Mention: Sean MacLean
- (1989) Winner: Betsy L. Schramm; Honorable Mention: Stephen Taylor
- (1988) Winner: Ronn Yedidia
- (1987) Winner: Christopher Keyes; Honorable Mention: Jeremy Beck, Robert C. May
- (1986) Winner: Donald Sloan; Honorable Mention: Linda Bouchard, Lowell Liebermann
- (1985) Winner: Matthew Harris; Honorable Mention: Dan May, Michael Torke
