= Scott Miller =

Scott Miller may refer to:

== Musicians ==
- Scott Miller (pop musician) (1960–2013), rock guitarist, songwriter, author, founder of bands Game Theory and The Loud Family
- Scott Miller (country musician) (born 1968), Southern rock singer with the Commonwealth, former member of the V-Roys

== Sports ==
- Scott Miller (racing driver) (born 1957), American racing driver, crew chief, and NASCAR executive
- Scott Miller (wide receiver, born 1968), American former football wide receiver
- Scotty Miller (born 1997), American football wide receiver
- Scott Miller (soccer, born 1972), Australian soccer coach and former player
- Scott Miller (soccer, born 1981), Australian soccer coach and former player
- Scott Miller (swimmer) (born 1975), Australian Olympic silver medalist in swimming

== Others ==
- Scott Miller (activist) (born 1979), American LGBT rights activist, philanthropist, and diplomat
- Scott Miller (artist) (1955–2008), American painter from Cleveland, Ohio
- Scott Miller (author) (born 1960), American journalist, author of The President and the Assassin
- Scott Miller (chemist) (born 1966), American organic chemist and professor
- Scott Miller (entrepreneur) (born 1961), founder of Apogee Software, programmer and developer of games such as Duke Nukem
- Scott Douglas Miller (born 1959), American university president
- Scott D. Miller, chief executive officer of SSA & Company
- Scott L. Miller (born 1966), American composer

== See also ==
- Austin Scott Miller (born 1961), United States Army general, appointed in 2018 as commander of NATO forces in Afghanistan
