= Tim Corpus =

- Born: 1987 (age 38–39)
- Education: The Hartt School, Chicago College of Performing Arts
- Occupations: Composer, sound designer, arts manager, educator
- Board member of: Illinois Council of Orchestras, Recording Academy Board of Governors
- Website: https://timcorpus.net

Tim Corpus is a Filipino-American composer based in Chicago, Illinois. He composes music for live performance, film, dance, games and has released multiple studio albums including “MMXX”, which was praised by critic Robert Hugill as “a striking disc.”

He created the Ultimate Guide to TouchOSC for TouchOSC from Hexler Heavy Industries.

== Music ==
His music has been performed by the Chicago Symphony Orchestra, Danville Symphony Orchestra, Lake Forest Symphony, Third Coast Percussion, Uniting Voices Chicago, and at Carnegie Hall, the Kennedy Center, Ravinia Festival, Chicago's Auditorium Theatre and features on BBC Radio 3, CNN Money, Illinois Public Media, 98.7 WFMT. His music is published with Attacca Publishing, LLC and the American Composers Alliance.

In 2026 the Chicago Symphony Orchestra under the direction of Chief Conductor Marin Alsop performed his "Great Lake Concerto" at the Ravinia Festival.

“Corpus’s writing is consistently inventive: It’s never quite clear whether the soloists are teasing one another or casually trying to one-up each other, and you’ll never hear a xylophone sound more mournful than it does at the middle of the movement. It's always a high endorsement, to both performer and composer, when people start hooting in the middle of a classical music piece like they’re at a stadium show.” - review by Hannah Edgar from the Chicago Tribune

In 2014 he was commissioned by Access Contemporary Music to compose a piece for the Women's Lounge at Chicago's Union Station.

Corpus studied with Robert Carl, Larry Alan Smith, Stacy Garrop, Vadim Karpinos, Ed Harrison, and David Macbride.

In August 2026 he released his fourth studio album.

For anyone dealing with stress, restless nights, or the constant mental noise that follows long creative days, Place of Rest offers a clear proposition. Put the album on, let the breath slow, let the outside room fade, and let the sound become less like entertainment and more like shelter.

— Will Vance, Tim Corpus’ Place of Rest Turns Ambient Into a Sleep Ritual, https://magneticmag.com/2026/08/tim-corpus-place-of-rest-turns-ambient-into-a-sleep-ritual/

== Arts Management ==
Corpus has worked with several arts organizations including the Chinese Fine Arts Society, Illinois Council of Orchestras, Charlotte New Music Festival , Northwest Indiana Symphony Orchestra, Hyde Park Youth Symphony, Lake Forest Symphony, and New Music Chicago. He was a founding leader of the Opera Festival of Chicago, and the executive director of the 2025 Ear Taxi Festival.

While at the Lake Forest Symphony, he was involved in the Musical Memories study, led by Dr. Hector Rasgado Flores. The purpose of the present study was to evaluate the effectiveness of a music therapy-informed program named Musical Memories conducted at the older adult living community.

In 2026 he was awarded executive director of the Year from the Illinois Council of Orchestras

He is the vice-chairman of the Chicago Chapter of the Society of Composers & Lyricists and a Chapter Governor for the The Recording Academy

== Select Works ==
=== Orchestral and Large Ensemble ===
- Where the Rivers Meet (2026)
- Great Lake Concerto (2024)
- Moonshot (2023)
- First Flight (2012)
- Breath (2012)

=== Chamber Music ===
- String Quartet No. 1 (2011)
- String Quartet No. 2 (2012)
- String Quartet No. 4 (2021)
- Bird in Space (2012)
- Letter's Home (2014)
- From Spring's Thaw (2013)

=== Soundtracks ===
- The Little Dancer (2026) - Dance show by Rachel Molinaro
- Coming Out for Christmas (2023) - Film by Milon V. Parker
- Jordan Black: SKETCH Symbol (2023–2024) Web series by Jordan Black
- Whodunit? (2023) - Dance show by Rachel Molinaro
- Ending the War on My Body (2022) - Dance show by Katherine McClintic

== Discography ==
Title	Details	Label
Place of Rest	Studio album; August 6, 2026	Attacca Publishing
Alphabet	Studio album; August 23, 2024	Attacca Publishing
Ending the War on My Body	Soundtrack album; November 3, 2023; Featuring Katherine McClintic	Attacca Publishing
MMXX	Studio album; September 10, 2021	Attacca Publishing
A is for Angela	Single release; March 31, 2021	Attacca Publishing
The Haunted House	Single release; October 30, 2020	Attacca Publishing
Breath	Studio album; September 2, 2014	Carlock Records
Ten x Ten	Compilation album; Nov 16, 2013	Access Contemporary Music
