= Mocolo =

Mocolo screenshot

Mocolo is a proprietary video analysis server for Microsoft Windows, mostly used in interactive environments. It monitors video streams, finds interactions (presences or movements) and sends analysis results to a list of client applications in form of Open Sound Control (OSC) packets. Key features: lightweight performance, capability to analyze several video sources at the same time, connectivity toward any OSC capable application. Mocolo makes use of small amounts of CPU time and no use of the GPU, leaving enough resources for other client applications running on the same machine.
