= Lawrence Dillon =

American composer (born 1959)

Lawrence Dillon (born July 3, 1959) is an American composer, and Composer in Residence at the University of North Carolina School of the Arts. His music has a wide range of expression, generally within a tonal idiom notable both for its rhythmic propulsiveness and a strong lyrical element. Acclaimed particularly for his chamber music, he has also written extensively for voice and large ensembles.

== Early life and education ==
Dillon was born in Summit, New Jersey to James and Jeanne Beaumont Dillon. He was the youngest of eight children. His father died of a brain tumor when Lawrence was two; his mother lived well into her nineties. He lost 50% of his hearing in an early childhood bout with chicken pox.

Intrigued by his siblings' piano lessons, he began his own at age seven, and soon developed a habit of composing a new work for his lesson each week. After undergraduate studies at the Hartt School of Music, he became the youngest composer to earn a doctorate at The Juilliard School, winning the Gretchaninoff Prize upon graduation (1985). He studied privately with Vincent Persichetti, and in classes with Milton Babbitt, Elliott Carter, David Diamond, Leon Kirchner and Roger Sessions. Other teachers included Edwin Finckel and James Sellars. As a student, he won an ASCAP Young Composers Award and first prize in the annual CRS New Music Competition. Upon graduation, he was appointed to the Juilliard faculty.

== Career highlights ==
In 1990, Dillon was offered the position of Assistant Dean at the University of North Carolina School of the Arts where he is now Composer in Residence. His works are recorded on the Bridge, Naxos and Albany labels and published by American Composers Editions, a subdivision of BMI. In recent years, he has received increasing recognition for music that Gramophone called "arresting and appealing." In the last ten years, his compositions have been commissioned and performed by the Emerson String Quartet, Lauren Flanigan, the Ravinia Festival, the Daedalus String Quartet, the Lincoln Trio, the Seattle Chamber Music Society, the Cassatt Quartet, the Kavafian/Jolley/Vonsattel Trio, Danielle Belén, Le Train Bleu, the Mansfield Symphony, the Boise Philharmonic, Wintergreen Summer Arts Festival, the Salt Lake Symphony, the Quartetto di Sassofoni d'Accademia, the Winston-Salem Symphony, Low and Lower, the University of Utah and the Idyllwild Symphony Orchestra. From 1999 to 2014 he worked on the Invisible Cities String Quartet Cycle, a set of six quartets zooming in on individual aspects of the quartet tradition.

Dillon has been a guest composer at numerous schools and festivals, including Juilliard School, The Curtis Institute of Music, the St. Petersburg/Rimsky Korsakov Conservatory, SUNY Stony Brook, the Colburn School of Music, the Ravinia Festival, the Hartt School of Music, the Charles Ives Center, Seisen International School, Wintergreen Summer Arts Festival, Charlotte New Music Festival, Spoleto Festival and Indiana University.

Dillon was the featured American composer in the February 2006 issue of Chamber Music magazine. He is a two-time winner of the North Carolina Artist Fellowship, the highest honor accorded to artists in the state.

== Critical reception ==
Reviewers of Dillon's music have repeatedly noted his arresting ideas, technical skill, lyricism and wit. In a review of his fourth string quartet, the Washington Post cited the work's "jewel-like craftsmanship," saying, "Dillon's control of time was a conspicuously imaginative element throughout." Gramophone called his recording Insects and Paper Airplanes "Sly and mysterious…just when you thought the string quartet may have reached the edge of sonic possibilities, along comes a composer who makes something novel, haunting and whimsical of the genre… Each score is an arresting and appealing creation, full of fanciful and lyrical flourishes…Highly recommended." Musicweb International commented on "music that is often profound without being pretentious, sometimes light-hearted but never 'lite', humorous without being arch, and immensely appealing but never frivolous." Fanfare magazine called him "an original in the best sense of the word."

== Recordings ==
- Six Scenes and a Fantasy (1983), produced by Contemporary Record Society, along with works by Peter Mennin, Henry Cowell and Martin Rokeach
- Chamber Music of Lawrence Dillon (2000), produced by Albany Records. Contains Furies and Muses, Devotion and String Quartet No. 1: Jests and Tenderness performed by the Borromeo Quartet, Cassatt Quartet and Mendelssohn String Quartets with flutist Ransom Wilson and bassoonist Jeff Keesecker.
- A New Century Christmas (2000), contains The Last Nowell and O Hellish Night performed by the New Century Saxophone Quartet.
- Appendage and Other Stories (2009), produced by Albany Records. Contains spoken-text chamber works Entrance and Exit, as well as the song cycle Appendage and the song "Still Point".
- Insects and Paper Airplanes (2010), produced by Bridge Records. Contains String Quartet No. 2: Flight, String Quartet No. 3: Air, String Quartet No. 4: The Infinite Sphere and a piano quartet What Happened performed by the Daedalus String Quartet and Benjamin Hochman.
- Lawrence Dillon Violin Music (2011), produced by Naxos Records. Contains seven works for violin solo and violin with one other instrument performed by Danielle Belén.
- Yael Manor Elixir (2015), produced by ACA. Includes the debut recording of Honey for solo piano.

== Major works ==
- Appendage (1993), recorded by Lauren Flanigan, conducted by Ransom Wilson
- Orpheus in the Afterworld: Concerto for Flute and Chamber Orchestra (1994)
- Devotion (1996), recorded by flutist Ransom Wilson and the Borromeo String Quartet
- Concerto for Violin and Orchestra (1996)
- Furies and Muses (1997), premiered and recorded by the Casatt String Quartet and bassoonist Jeffrey Keesecker
- Symphony No. 1 (1998), commissioned and premiered by the Carolina Chamber Symphony
- String Quartet No. 1: Jests and Tenderness (1999), premiered and recorded by the Mendelssohn String Quartet
- Snegglish Dances (2000), commissioned by the Louisville Orchestra and winner of the 2001 Leonard Bernstein Award for Educational Programming from the American Symphony Orchestra League and ASCAP
- Lessons of my youth (2001) for a capella male chorus
- The memory of light (2001) for a capella SATB chorus
- Amadeus ex machina (2001), given its Russian premiere by the St. Petersburg Chamber Philharmonic
- Buffa (2001) an opera
- String Quartet No. 2: Flight (2002), premiered and recorded by the Daedalus Quartet
- Wright Flight (2003) for orchestra and three narrators, projected images and three strands of narrative, commissioned by the 2003 Illuminations festival at Roanoke Island Festival Park
- Revenant: Concerto for Horn and Orchestra (2005), premiered by hornist David Jolley with the composer conducting
- What Happened (2005), for piano quartet, premiered by the Atlantic Ensemble
- Blown Away (2005) for wind ensemble
- Entrance and Exit (2007), two concert-framing works for actor and chamber ensemble
- String Quartet No. 4: The Infinite Sphere (2009), commissioned and recorded by the Daedalus String Quartet
- String Quartet No. 5: Through the Night (2009), commissioned by the Emerson String Quartet
- Figments and Fragments (2010), commissioned by the Idyllwild Symphony Orchestra, the Boise Philharmonic, the University of Utah Philharmonia and the Salt Lake Symphony
- Shadow on the Sun (2010) for wind ensemble
- Seven Stories (2013), premiered by Le Train Bleu with soprano Mary Mackenzie
- Sanctuary (2013) septet for piano, horn and strings, commissioned and premiered by the Seattle Chamber Music Society
- String Quartet No. 6: Rapid Eye (2014), commissioned by the Carpe Diem String Quartet
- Katabasis (2014), double concerto for cello, bass and orchestra
- Poke (2014), for solo cello, double-bass, and string orchestra
- Air (2014) for string orchestra
- Sure (2015) for soprano and orchestra
- Silent Bond (2016) for mixed ensemble
- Manic (2017) for percussion ensemble
- Stillness and Velocity (2018) for horn, violin and piano, premiered by David Jolley, Ani Kavafian and Gilles Vonsatel
- Nest (2018) for chamber orchestra
- String Quartet No. 7: Consensus (2019)
- String Quartet No. 8: Last Spring (2020) commissioned and premiered by the Reynolda String Quartet
- String Quartet No. 9: we thought we heard (2021)
- Portal (2022) for saxophone octet
- String Quartet No. 10 (2022)
- Abundance (2024) for piano quartet
- Vanishing (2025) for orchestra
- String Quartet No. 11: Nocturne (2025)

Dillon's blog Infinite Curves was featured on Sequenza21.com for ten years before moving to ArtsJournal.
