= Dona nobis pacem =

Latin phrase used in the Christian mass

Dona nobis pacem (Latin for "Grant us peace") is a phrase in the Agnus Dei section of the mass. The phrase, in isolation, has been appropriated for a number of musical works, which include:

== Classical music ==
- "Dona nobis pacem", a traditional round
- Dona nobis pacem, fugue by Ludwig van Beethoven (now thought genuine), Hess Anh. 57 (1795)
- Dona nobis pacem, cantata by Ralph Vaughan Williams (1936)
- Title of the third movement of Symphonie Liturgique by Arthur Honegger (1945)
- Title of a choral work by Ann Loomis Silsbee (1981)
- Dona nobis pacem for choir and orchestra by the Latvian composer, Pēteris Vasks (1996)
- Title of section of Adiemus V: Vocalise by Karl Jenkins (2003)

== Literature ==
- "Dona Nobis Pacem" is repeatedly quoted in Graham Greene's 1938 novel Brighton Rock by its antihero Pinkie Brown.
- "Dona Nobis Pacem" is used in Graham Greene's 1966 novel The Comedians.

== Other Musical Uses ==
- The song was included in Bobby Darin's Christmas album The 25th Day of December (1960).
- The title of a song, from the Present from Nancy LP by the Dutch band Supersister (1970).
- Referenced in the second half of the song "She Was Naked" by the Dutch band Supersister (1970).
- Performed by cast members (as an impromptu choir) in the M*A*S*H Christmas episode "Dear Sis" (1978).
- At the end of Pray Your Gods by Toad the Wet Sprocket (1992).
- Bass guitarist Michael Manring performs an instrumental version on the Windham Hill compilation A Winter's Solstice IV (1993).
- Included in an arrangement of "I Heard the Bells on Christmas Day" recorded by Wayne Watson on One Christmas Eve (1994).
- A setting by David Fanshawe, on the recording of African Sanctus (1994).
- Clarinetist Richard Stoltzman performs the song on the Windham Hill compilation The Carols of Christmas (1996).
- Updated with modern Christmas lyrics interpolated by American bluegrass group Salamander Crossing, as a bonus track on their compilation album Henry Street - A Retrospective (2000).
- The title of a composition by Motoi Sakuraba in the video game Tales of Destiny 2 and featured throughout the series. (2002)
- Track 12 of the album Whiskey Tango Ghosts, by Tanya Donelly (2004).
- One track of the album No Boundaries, by Ladysmith Black Mambazo (2006).
- The phrase is repeated in the song "Old City (Instrumental)" on the album Instrumentals by the Shanghai Restoration Project (2008).
- The title of a track in the Max Richter score for the HBO show The Leftovers (2014).
- A song performed by an unnamed family in season 3, episode 11 of The Handmaid's Tale, Liars (2019).

== Other References ==
- The phrase is used by the Doctor - season 4, episode 6 of Doctor Who, "The Poison Sky" - when speaking in code to Donna Noble who is trapped on the TARDIS by the Sontarans (2008).
- Sister Steven, a character in the comic strip 9 Chickweed Lane repeatedly uses the phrase when her patience is being tried.
