= Ann Loomis Silsbee =

American composer and poet

Ann Loomis Silsbee (21 July 1930 - 28 August 2003) was an American composer and poet who composed two operas, published three books of poetry, and received several awards, commissions, and fellowships.

Silsbee was born in Cambridge, Massachusetts. She earned a bachelor's degree from Radcliffe College, a master's in music from Syracuse University, and a doctor of musical arts in composition from Cornell University. She studied with Irving Fine, Earl George, and Karel Husa, and in Paris with unspecified teachers. Her dissertation was on a composition by Peter Maxwell Davies called Stone Litany. While at Cornell, she attended a poetry seminar led by Archibald Randolph (A.R.) Ammons, whose poetry she would later set to music. She married Robert Silsbee, a physicist who taught at Cornell, and they had three sons, Doug, David, and Peter.

In 1964, Silsbee's work River was performed at the Ferienkurs fuer Neue Musik in Darmstadt, Germany. In the late 1960s and early 1970s, she taught at the State University of Cortland (New York) and at Cornell University. In the early 2000s, she hosted several poetry groups and retreats. Her awards, commissions, and fellowships included:

== Awards ==
- Burge Eastman Prize
- Society for New Music

== Commissions ==
- First Street Playhouse, New York
- TROIKA Association, Ithaca, New York

== Fellowships ==
- Composers Conference, Vermont
- Composer Fellowship Grant, National Endowment for the Arts
- Yaddo Residency 1979

Silsbee served on the boards of the American Composers Alliance (ACA) and the International League of Women Composers. Her papers are archived at Cornell University. Her works were recorded commercially on the LPs TURNA TV 34704 and NORTH NR 221, and published by the ACA. They include:

== Books ==
- Book of Ga
- Fullest Tide (published posthumously)
- Orioling

== Chamber ==
- Another River (cello quartet and percussion)
- Expressions (clarinet)
- Glyphs (guitar and harpsichord)
- Go Gentle (three woodwinds or three strings)
- Journey (flute and percussion)
- Pathway (percussion and strings)
- Phantasy (oboe and harpsichord)
- Pharos (cello, piano and percussion)
- Quartet (clarinet, violin, cello and piano)
- Quest (string quartet)
- Runemusic (cello)
- Spirals (string quartet; also arranged for piano and for orchestra)
- Three Chants (unspecified number of flutes)
- Trialogue (violin, clarinet and piano)

== Dance ==
- River (two groups of musicians and optional dancers)

== Electronic ==
- Prometheus (bass, chorus, chamber ensemble and tape)

== Opera ==
- Nightingale’s Apprentice (for children; libretto by Margaret Weaver)
- People Tree

== Orchestra ==
- Seven Rituals
- Spirals (also arranged for string quartet and for piano)
- Trois Historiettes

== Piano ==
- Bagatelle
- Corrai (prepared piano)
- Doors (Burge Eastman prize)
- Expressions
- In and Out the Window
- Letter from a Field Biologist (two pianos)
- Spirals (also arranged for string quartet and for orchestra)

== Vocal ==
- An Acre for a Bird (motet)
- Bourn (text by A. R. Ammons; soprano, tenor, cello and harpsichord)
- Canticle (text after the Song of Solomon; soprano, oboe and harpsichord)
- De Amore et Morte (woman's voice and chamber ensemble)
- Diffraction (text by e. e. cummings; soprano, flute, piano and percussion)
- Dona Nobis Pacem (chorus)
- “Huit Chants en Brun” (text by Federico Garcia Lorca; translated into French by Andre Belamich)
- Hymn (text by A. R. Ammons; soprano, oboe and piano)
- Icarus (eight voices, recorder, and bongo drums)
- Leavings (soprano, percussion and prepared piano)
- Mirages (text by e. e. cummings; bass, cello and quarter tone harpsichord)
- “Now” (text by e. e. cummings)
- Only the Cold, Bare Moon (song cycle based on eight Chinese poems; soprano, flute and piano)
- Pictures from Brueghel (soprano and chorus)
- Raft (text by A. R. Ammons; narrator and percussion)
- Scroll (soprano and chamber ensemble)
