= John S. Hilliard =

American classical composer (1947–2019)

John Stanley Hilliard (October 29, 1947 – November 15, 2019) was an American composer.

== Early life ==
Born in Hot Springs, Arkansas, United states, into a family of musical amateurs, John Hilliard began his musical training by studying piano at the age of 6 from his cousin, Barbara Dodson, a local piano teacher and composer. His father, Sherlon Hilliard (of Irish and English descent), possessed a fine tenor voice and was a popular gospel-style singer with their county Protestant Church of the Nazarene congregations. While his mother, Laurine H. Hilliard (of Scottish descent), was an amateur accordionist and pianist. Hilliard’s grandfather, John Milton Hilliard, had also been well known as a congregational song leader (shaped-note tradition) for the rural areas of central Arkansas in the 1930s and 1940s. By age 11 Hilliard showed an interest in composing. At the age of 8, he had begun playing trumpet in the elementary band and was taught by the same elementary music teacher as President Bill Clinton, who was a childhood friend. They later both shared another influential music teacher, Virgil Spurlin, during their years together in the Hot Springs High School Band. In 1964 Hilliard played at all-state band under W. Francis McBeth, who would later become his first composition teacher for four years at Ouachita Baptist University, Arkadelphia, Arkansas. Hilliard would earn his Bachelor of Music degree there in 1969 in horn performance, education and theory-composition. He studied piano, horn, trumpet, cello and conducting during these years at Ouachita. Hilliard later, in 1972, received his Masters of Music degree in composition and conducting at Virginia Commonwealth University. During his years at VCU, Hilliard studied briefly with famed African-American composer William Grant Still.

== Career ==
Hilliard's music has had performances in Austria, Canada, Germany, Hong Kong, Ireland, Japan, the Netherlands, South America, the United Kingdom and the United States including performances at the John F. Kennedy Center for the Performing Arts, Merkin Concert Hall and at numerous new music festivals. His orchestral works have been performed by the Saint Louis Symphony Orchestra and the Richmond Symphony Orchestra. His piano concerto No. 1, "Okeanos", was premiered in 2000 by pianist Eric Ruple with the James Madison University Wind Symphony at the College Band Directors National Association Conference. Hilliard's second piano concerto was commissioned by the Staunton Music Festival (Virginia) and had its premiere there at the Blackfriars Playhouse in 2004, with the composer conducting. In 2006, the James Madison University Wind Symphony premiered his "Variations on a Theme from 'L'oiseau de feu'".

Hilliard had composed four symphonies; three piano concerti; a trumpet concerto; sonatas for piano, violin, and cello; works for wind ensemble; and various other chamber works, including two song cycles. In 1973 he studied composition with George B. Wilson, University of Michigan at Interlochen. Hilliard received his Doctor of Musical Arts degree from Cornell University, Ithaca, N.Y. in 1983. From 1981 to 1985 he did four years post-doctoral composition study at Southern Methodist University with Donald Erb, and one year of study at the University of Texas, Austin with the American expatriate French composer, Eugene Kurtz, of Jobert publications, Paris, France.

In 1973, during his years working at the Interlochen Arts Academy, Interlochen, Michigan, Hilliard was encouraged by Thor Johnson, then conductor of the Nashville Symphony, by his requesting him to compose a work for the Interlochen Arts Academy Orchestra. This was Hilliard's "The Grand Traverse: Concerto for Trumpet and Orchestra", which was premiered at Interlochen's Corson Auditorium by the orchestra in 1975 with Byron Hanson conducting and John Lindenau on solo trumpet.

In 1981 Hilliard was awarded a summer residency position and commission from the Virginia Center for the Creative Arts. His first symphony was chosen in an American Orchestra League competition for premiere by Leonard Slatkin for the Saint Louis Symphony Orchestra in 1989. Hilliard has won annual ASCAP Awards, a commission from the International Horn Society and the first-place award in the Virginia Music Teachers Association's commissioned composer contest for 1992.

President Bill Clinton requested Hilliard to compose a fanfare for his first inauguration in 1993.

The Far East and Asian music have had a profound influence upon his life and composing. Hilliard studied and played in Cornell University's Javanese gamelan under the leadership of Jennifer Lindsay. In 1995, Hilliard was given an Artistic Fellow residency grant by the Japan Foundation in Tokyo, studying shakuhachi with Christopher Yohmei Blasdel and gagaku in Nara at the Kasuga Shrine. He resided in Tokyo, Koto-Ku district, Fukagawa area. In 1996 he studied Indian and Balinese music in California. Two years later, Hilliard was granted a Senior Fulbright Award to teach and compose in Hong Kong for 1998-99.

He had lived parts of 12 years in Japan. During his years there, in addition to studying Japanese traditional music, he practiced Zen Buddhism (zazen in Nara). He was both a Buddhist and a Christian. Hilliard was also a follower of "Eastern religions". He had been a member of the Episcopal Church (U.S.) since 1986. Hilliard was married to Japanese abstract artist Mineko Yoshida.

Hilliard had served on the music faculty at the Interlochen Center for the Arts, National Music Camp (1967–1990), Cornell University, and Washington State University. He taught music composition for 14 summers at the Interlochen Arts Camp (formerly the National Music Camp), and for three years was on the faculty and administrative staff of the Interlochen Arts Academy, during which time he founded and conducted their first contemporary music group "The 20th-Century Chamber Players". At Cornell, Hilliard was the conductor of the Cornell Chamber Orchestra and Assistant Conductor of the Cornell Symphony under Edward Murray. He retired from teaching in 2013 and is Emeritus Professor of Music and former Resident Composer at the School of Music of James Madison University. Among Hilliard's teachers include Pulitzer Prize-winning composer Karel Husa, Donald Erb, W. Francis McBeth, Robert Moffat Palmer, George B. Wilson, William Grant Still and Ned Rorem (Pulitzer Prize, 1976). In addition, he has attended masterclasses with Ezra Laderman, Alan Hovhaness, Włodzimierz Kotoński, George Crumb, Homer Keller, Milton Babbitt, Ben Johnston, Joseph Schwantner, Paul Creston and Olivier Messiaen. He earned a doctorate in Music Composition from Cornell University at Ithaca, New York in 1983. Numbered among his students is Joel McNeely, a noted film composer for Disney studios and George Lucas. Other students include Steve Van Dam (founder of the band Everything), David Castle (songwriter), Terry Vosbein (composer/arranger/educator), Larry Clark (Vice Pres., Editor-in-Chief, Carl Fischer Music), Evan Duffy, Matthew Labarge, and Butch Taylor (formerly of the Dave Matthews Band).

The Augsburg Mozartfest commissioned Hilliard to complete one of Wolfgang Amadeus Mozart's unfinished manuscripts, one for violoncello and cembalo that had been started in 1782, the year Mozart married. Hilliard completed the manuscript fragment in the style of Mozart and added his own set of variations from the fragments. This set was premiered May 2004, in Augsburg, Germany, by cellist James Wilson and pianist Carsten Schmidt.

On January 31, 2007 a concert of Hilliard's music was presented at the John F. Kennedy Center for the Performing Arts, which included the Washington, D.C. premiere of his second piano concerto performed by guest pianist Carsten Schmidt of Sarah Lawrence College. In 2010 the James Madison University orchestra, with Lori Piitz, performed a movement of his Third Piano Concerto in the new Forbes Performing Arts Center on the campus of James Madison University. Also they have premiered his Eleison for large women's chorus and harps, 2 pianos, four cello and four doublebasses. The text made use of English, Greek and Hebrew.

In 2013 the university sponsored a special celebratory concert in his honor which was attended by 30 former composition students, and performed mostly by JMU current music majors.

== Later life ==
After retiring, Hilliard completed a commission for the World Saxophone Congress for premiere in France in 2015. He adjudicated for the Washington International Composition competition and has taught as a substitute at the University of Virginia in Charlottesville.

He died in Fishersville, Virginia, in November 2019.
