= Opera Festival of Chicago =

- Opera Festival
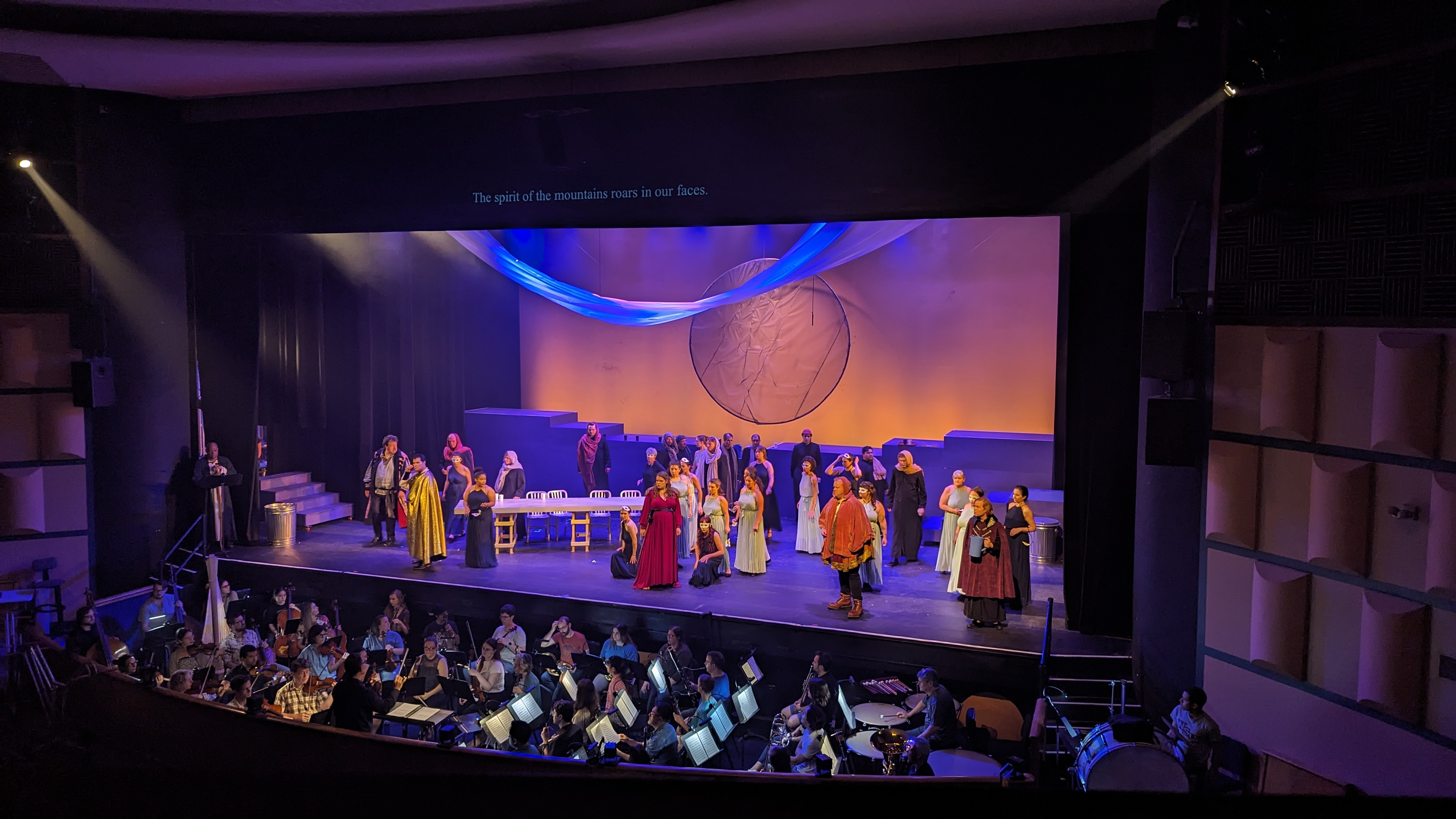
- Opera Festival of Chicago performance of Attila in July 2023
- Founded: 2020; 6 years ago
- Location: Chicago, Illinois, USA
- Music director: Emanuele Andrizzi
- Website: www.operafestivalchicago.org

The Opera Festival of Chicago is a summer opera festival based in Chicago, Illinois. Founded in 2020 by Uff. Emanuele Andrizzi, Tim Corpus, Franco Pomponi, and Ella Marchment, the company presents Italian operas, vocal recital concerts, and special events.

The festival has worked with renowned opera singers from around the world including Ferruccio Furlanetto, Andrea Silvestrelli, Patrick Blackwell, Jose Simerilla Romero, Kenneth Tarver, Maria Kanyova, Jonathan Tetelman, Franco Pomponi, and others.

== History ==
The festival launched its first live festival in 2021 after moving its originally planned festival online due to the COVID-19 pandemic.

Between 2023 and 2025, the festival scaled up to involve over 150 cast and crew members. The company formed strategic partnerships with the Italian Cultural Institute and the Chicago Federation of Musicians, while also launching a dedicated Young and Emerging Artist Program to mentor the next generation of singers.

== Operas ==
Main Stage Festival Shows
Year	Show	Composer	Venue	Dates
2026	La bohème	Giacomo Puccini	North Shore Center for the Performing Arts	June 26, July 1, 5, 2026
2026	Adriana Lecouvreur	Francesco Cilea	North Shore Center for the Performing Arts	June 28, July 3, 2026
2025	L’amore dei tre re	Italo Montemezzi	Athenaeum Center for Thought & Culture	May 9, 11, 2025
2025	Pagliacci	Ruggero Leoncavallo	North Shore Center for the Performing Arts	June 27, 29, 2025
2024	Manon Lescaut	Giacomo Puccini	Cahn Auditorium	June 27, 29, 30, 2024
2024	Il Prigioniero	Luigi Dallapiccola	Athenaeum Center for Thought & Culture	July 11, 14, 2024
2024	The Medium	Gian Carlo Menotti	Athenaeum Center for Thought & Culture	July 11, 14, 2024
2023	Assassinio nella cattedrale	Ildebrando Pizzetti	The Chicago Temple	July 6, 9, 2023
2023	Attila	Giuseppe Verdi	Cahn Auditorium	July 20, 23, 2023
2022	L’Inganno Felice	Gioachino Rossini	Athenaeum Center for Thought & Culture	July 8, 10, 2022
2022	Il Corsaro	Giuseppe Verdi	Cahn Auditorium	July 22, 24, 2022
2021	Il Segreto di Susanna	Ermanno Wolf-Ferrari	Athenaeum Center for Thought & Culture	July 24, 2021
2021	Il Tabarro	Giacomo Puccini	Thalia Hall	August 5, 2021
