= Rolv Yttrehus =

American classical composer

Rolv Berger Yttrehus (born Duluth, Minnesota, March 12, 1926 – February 4, 2018) was an American composer of contemporary classical music.

He held degrees from the University of Minnesota and University of Michigan and a Diploma from the Accademia di Santa Cecilia in Rome. He studied harmony with Nadia Boulanger and composition with Ross Lee Finney, Roger Sessions, Aaron Copland, and Goffredo Petrassi. He taught at the University of Missouri, Purdue University, University of Wisconsin, Oshkosh, and Rutgers University.

He regarded Arnold Schoenberg and Sessions as his principal influences.

He died in 2018.

== List of works ==
- Six Pieces for Piano Solo (1942–45)
- Six Haiku (1960) pub. American Composers Alliance
- Music for Winds, Percussion, and Viola (1961) pub. American Composers Alliance
- Espressioni per Orchestra (1962) pub. American Composers Alliance
- Sextet (1964–70, revised 1974) pub. C. F. Peters Corporation
- Music for Winds, Percussion, 'Cello and Voices (1969) pub. Association for the Promotion of New Music (APNM)
- Angstwagen (1971) pub. American Composers Alliance
- Quintet (1973) pub. Boelke-Bomart/Mobart Music
- Gradus ad Parnassum (1974–79) pub. American Composers Alliance
- Sonata for Percussion and Piano (1982) pub. C. F. Peters Corporation
- Explorations for Piano Solo (1985) pub. APNM
- Sonata for 'Cello and Piano (1988, revised 1989) pub. C. F. Peters Corporation
- Raritan Variations (1989) pub. APNM
- Symphony No. 1 (1998) pub. APNM
- Plectrum Spectrum (2000) pub. APNM
- Sextet II (2006) pub. APNM
- Laudate Milton Babbitt (2006) pub. APNM

== Bibliography ==
- Boros, James. 1988. "An Interview with Rolv Yttrehus on the Occasion of Gradus Ad Parnassum." Perspectives of New Music, 26/2 (Summer): 238–253
- Boros, James. 1991. "The Role of Percussion Instruments in the Music of Rolv Yttrehus." Percussive Notes 30/2 (December): 63–68
