= Neva Pilgrim =

American soprano (1938-2024)

Neva Pilgrim (November 21, 1938 – January 21, 2024) was an American soprano known for her work in the performance of contemporary classical music.

She grew up on a farm in Cottonwood County in southwestern Minnesota, near Bingham Lake, between Mountain Lake and Windom. She graduated magna cum laude from Hamline University, received a Master of Music degree from Yale University, and studied at the Vienna Academy of Music on a Ditson Fellowship. She worked closely with many composers, including Pierre Boulez, Lukas Foss, Luciano Berio, George Rochberg, R. Murray Schafer, Ralph Shapey, Richard Wernick, Luigi Dallapiccola, Gunther Schuller, and Steven Stucky.

Pilgrim sang as a soloist with the Chicago Symphony, Syracuse Symphony, Binghamton Symphony, New York Philharmonic, Brooklyn Philharmonic, Northeastern Philharmonic, and the St. Paul Chamber Orchestra.

She released over 20 recordings and was one of the three founding members of the Society for New Music, which was established in Syracuse, New York in 1971. She was an artist-in-residence at Colgate University until 2023 and had a private studio in New York City.

Among her awards were a Martha Baird Rockefeller grant, NEA and Fromm Foundation commission grants. She also received a Certificate of Merit for her significant contribution to the field of music from the Yale School of Music, an outstanding alumni award from Hamline University, and the Laurel Leaf Award from the American Composers Alliance (1994).

She was a long-time resident of Syracuse, New York.
