= Avery Claflin =

American composer

Avery Claflin (January 21, 1898 - January 9, 1979) was an American composer, although he studied law and business, later pursuing a career in banking. He served as president for the French American Banking Corp.

== Life and career ==
He was born in New Hampshire and graduated from Harvard University where he was a member of the Harvard Glee Club. Claflin was originally a pianist but he pivoted after sustaining an injury while serving during World War I which resulted in the loss of one of his fingers. Among Claflin's connections in France after the war ended, were the French composer Erik Satie and French writer Jean Cocteau.

Claflin married Dorothea Carroll in 1922. He went into banking after marrying his wife who came from a banking family. Claflin was a business associate of Charles Ives. Although he worked in business, Claflin found time to compose music and be active in various musical organizations, including the Society of Friends of Music and The New School for Social Research. He retired in 1954, and he composed many of his works after this date.

Among his works is a madrigal, Lament for April 15, which uses as its text instructions for an Internal Revenue Service tax form. This choral work received its premiere in 1955 at Tanglewood, in Berkshire County, Massachusetts. Every year on April 15, Karl Haas, musician, conductor, and radio host, played a recording of this composition on his public radio program, Adventures in Good Music.

He was a member and at one time treasurer of the American Composers Alliance.

== Musical works ==
- "Lament for April 15" (1955)
- "La Grande Bretèche," (1956)
- "Design for the Atomic Age" (1956)
- "Fish-house Punch" (1957)
- "Teen Scenes" (1958)
- "The Quangle Wangle's Hat"
