= Milton Adolphus =

American pianist and composer (1913–1988)

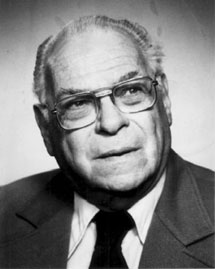
Irving Milton Adolphus

Irving Milton Adolphus (January 27, 1913 – August 16, 1988) was an American pianist and composer.

== Biography ==
Milton Adolphus (January 27, 1913 – August 16, 1988) was an American composer, pianist, and music administrator whose career spanned popular music, classical composition, and public service. His output includes more than 200 orchestral, chamber, and vocal works, among them 13 symphonies and 35 string quartets, including one unnumbered quartet. He was also active in music education, arts administration, and civil rights organizations.

Adolphus was born in the Bronx, New York City, and received his early musical training there. He later attended Yale University, where he studied music before continuing advanced compositional studies in Philadelphia with Rosario Scalero, a teacher known for his emphasis on formal clarity and structural discipline and for his influence on a generation of American composers.

During the early 1930s, Adolphus worked as a pianist and arranger in stage shows and dance bands, participating in the professional popular-music environment of the period. In 1930, while still in his teens, he composed the melody later known as "Dream a Little Dream of Me." Contemporary newspaper accounts and surviving documentation indicate that he sold the song outright that year for $12.50, relinquishing any future ownership or royalty interest. The song was later published and credited to other composers, with lyrics supplied by a third author, and went on to become one of the most frequently recorded standards in American popular music.

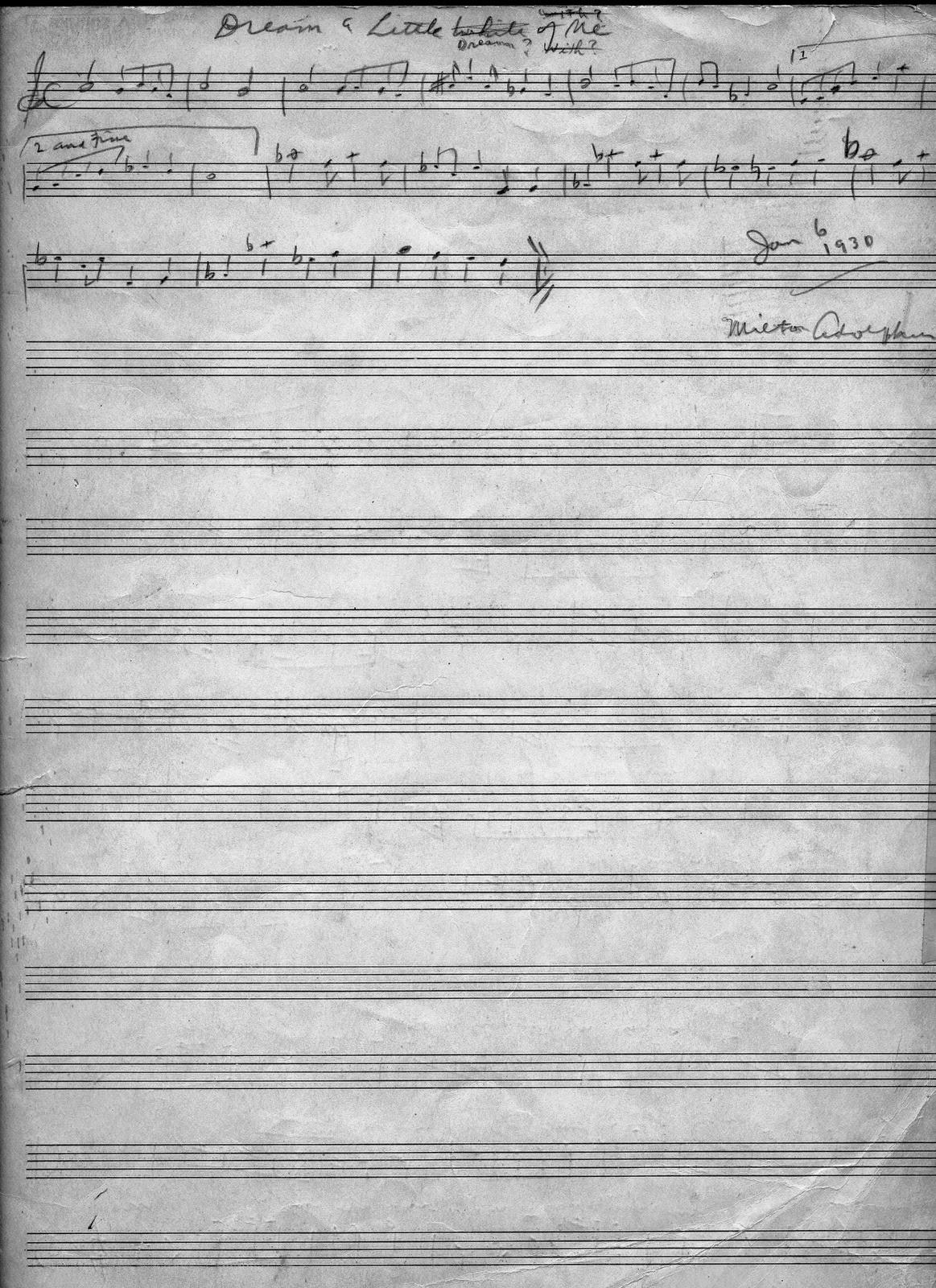
Handwritten musical manuscript titled Dream a Little Dream of Me, dated January 6, 1930, in the hand of Milton Adolphus.

In 1936, Adolphus was appointed Director of the Philadelphia Music Center, where he organized concerts, educational programs, and performances connecting contemporary classical music with broader public audiences. During this period, he became involved with several major musical institutions. He was a founding member of the American Composers Alliance, an organization established to support the performance and publication of American concert music, whose first president was Aaron Copland. He also served as a board member of the League of Composers and was involved extensively with the Curtis Institute of Music.

Adolphus was active in civic and social organizations as well. He participated in the United States civil rights movement and later helped found the Urban League of Harrisburg, reflecting his long-standing commitment to community engagement alongside his musical work.

In 1938, Adolphus moved to Harrisburg, Pennsylvania, where he joined the Department of Labor and Industry of the Commonwealth of Pennsylvania. He remained in state service until his retirement in 1974. Throughout this period, he maintained a dual career, working full time in public service while composing steadily. Much of his large-scale compositional output, including symphonies, string quartets, and chamber works, was written outside academic or institutional appointments.

Adolphus married Elena Watnik (1913–2005), later known as Elena Adolphus. The couple had one son, Stephen Harris Adolphus, born in Harrisburg on September 19, 1939. The family remained based in Harrisburg for many decades, where Adolphus was active in local musical organizations, choral conducting, and church music.

After retiring from state employment, Adolphus relocated to West Harwich, Massachusetts, on Cape Cod. There he continued to compose and became involved with the Chatham Unitarian Universalist Fellowship, which he helped organize. His later years were devoted largely to composition and community music activities.

Milton Adolphus died on August 16, 1988, in Harwich, Massachusetts. His survivors included his wife, Elena, and his son, Stephen. His legacy is preserved in part through the Milton Adolphus Award, presented annually to a student at Fiorello H. LaGuardia High School of Music & Art and Performing Arts in New York City, recognizing achievement in composition.

== Early career and popular music work ==
During the late 1920s and early 1930s, Milton Adolphus was active as a pianist, arranger, and songwriter in the professional popular-music world of New York City and the surrounding region. Like many young musicians of his generation, he worked within the vaudeville circuit, performing with dance bands and orchestras in New York City and in the Catskill Mountains, where seasonal venues and resorts supported a steady demand for live music. This environment required versatility, speed, and practical musicianship, and Adolphus developed his early professional skills within that context.

In 1931, Adolphus collaborated with Irving “Ving” Merlin on the song "I Can’t Believe It", a work documented in the Catalog of Copyright Entries. The collaboration reflects the common working practices of the period, in which composers and performers frequently partnered on individual songs while continuing to circulate among multiple ensembles and engagements.

By the early 1930s, Adolphus had also established himself as an arranger for major dance orchestras. During this period he worked with Glen Gray's Casa Loma Orchestra, one of the most prominent big bands of the era. Adolphus is credited with arranging the orchestra’s theme song, "Smoke Rings", which became closely associated with the ensemble and remains one of the best-known big-band themes of the period.

Although Adolphus later devoted the majority of his career to concert music and public service, his early professional work placed him squarely within the commercial music economy of the interwar years. This experience shaped both his technical fluency and his understanding of how music circulated beyond formal concert settings, informing his later activities as a composer, administrator, and advocate for American music.

== Compositions ==
- Dream a Little Dream of Me (1930)
- Symphony No. 8, in B minor (1936)
- Adagio for solo violin, solo cello and sinfonietta, Op. 42
- Birthday Suite for piano, Op. 87
- Bitter Suite for oboe, 4 clarinets and strings, Op. 98 (1955)
- Bouncettino for viola and piano, Op. 78 (1944)
- Cape Cod Suite, Op. 200
- David's Dream for orchestra, Op. 149
- Dream World for piano, Op. 90
- Elegy, Op. 46
- Elegy for clarinet, horn, violin, viola and cello, Op. 81
- Faith, an oratorio, Op. 123
- Five Vignettes for piano, Op. 94
- Four Poems
- Improvisation for viola and piano, Op. 61 (1937)
- Interlude for cello and chamber orchestra, Op. 96
- Lilacs for medium voice with clarinet and piano, Op. 95 (1982)
- Opus 93 for clarinet and piano, Op. 93
- Opus 99 for flute (or clarinet) and piano, Op. 99
- Petits Fours for cello and piano (1960)
- Prelude and Allegro for string orchestra, Op. 51
- Septet, Op. 39
- Septet in F♯ minor for oboe (or flute), 3 violins, 2 violas, 1 cello, Op. 39a
- Song of the Aircraft Warning Corps (1943)
- String Octet No. 2, Op.175
- String Quartet No. 8 in E Minor, Op. 41
- String Quartet No. 10, Op. 45
- String Quartet No. 13, Op. 63
- String Quartet No. 14, Op. 65
- String Quartet No. 15, Op. 67
- String Quartet No. 16 "Indian", Op. 69
- String Quartet No. 17, Op. 70
- String Quartet No. 18, Op. 72
- String Quartet No. 20, Op. 80
- String Quartet No. 21 "In Ancient Style", Op. 84
- String Quartet No. 23, Op. 91
- Suite for string orchestra
- Suite No. 2 for orchestra
- Tribach for flute, clarinet and piano, Op. 101
- Trio Prosaico for violin, horn and piano, Op. 147
- Ulalume, Op. 39b
- War Sketches
- Wind Quartet, Op. 20

== Recordings ==
Few Adolphus recordings are currently available; however, Adolphus/Pisk/Gerschefski/McBride, a Composers Recordings, Inc. album from 1965, recorded by the National Polish Radio Symphony Orchestra, was reissued in 2010 by New World Records, and contains Adolphus' Elegy (1936). Additionally, many scores can be ordered from the American Composers Alliance reprint service.
