= International Hans Gabor Belvedere Singing Competition =

The International Hans Gabor Belvedere Singing Competition is an annual competition for young opera singers. It has been described as "THE 'springboard' for a career in opera", or the "singers' stock exchange, the 'Wall Street of Voices'".

Hans Gabor (founder of the Wiener Kammeroper) created the contest in 1982 to promote the careers of emerging opera artists. Categories for operetta and accompaniment were added later. The competition is judged by a panel of opera managers, agents, and media representatives. Competitors from around the world participate, with the qualifying round of competition taking place in 50 cities. A number of different prizes are awarded, including cash and opera engagements.

The competition was the subject of a 2012 documentary film, Wall Street of Voices.

== List of winners ==
The main prizes include 1st, 2nd, and 3rd Opera prizes, which are aimed at recognizing the top talents of the competition. Over the years, the prize categories have expanded and adapted to include other special prizes such as the Audience Prize and the Media Prize.

Year	Prize	Name
2024	1st Prize Opera	Jungrae Noah Kim
2024	2nd Prize Opera	Daniel O'Hearn
2024	3rd Prize Opera	Matthew Cairns
2023	1st Prize Opera	Ann-Kathrin Niemczyk
2023	2nd Prize Opera	Filip Filipović
2023	3rd Prize Opera	Jose Simerilla Romero
2022	1st Prize Opera	Key'mon Murrah
2022	2nd Prize Opera	Nikita Ivasechko
2022	3rd Prize Opera	Rueben Mbonambi
2021	1st Prize Opera	Joshua Lovell
2021	2nd Prize Opera	Elena Villalón
2021	2nd Prize Opera	Verity Wingate
2021	3rd Prize Opera	Kangyoon Lee
2019	1st Prize Opera	Valeriia Savinskaia
2019	2nd Prize Opera	Boikhutso Owen Metsileng
2019	3rd Prize Opera	Slávka Zámečníková
2018	1st Prize Opera	Sungho Kim
2018	2nd Prize Opera	Georgios Stavrakakis
2018	3rd Prize Opera	Pavel Petrov
2017	1st Prize Opera	Aigul Akhmetshina
2017	2nd Prize Opera	Kang Wang
2017	3rd Prize Opera	Mandla Mndebele
2016	1st Prize Opera	Nicholas Brownlee
2016	2nd Prize Opera	Noluvuyiso Mpofu
2016	3rd Prize Opera	Raehann Bryce-Davis
2015	1st Prize Opera	Levy Sekgapane
2015	2nd Prize Opera	Lise Davidsen
2015	3rd Prize Opera	Ki Hun Park
