= Levy Sekgapane =

South-African operatic tenor (born 1990)

- Born: Kroonstad, Free State, South Africa
- Genres: Opera
- Occupation: Opera singer (tenor)
- Years active: 2013–present
- Website: levysekgapane.com

Levy Sekgapane is a South-African operatic and Bel canto tenor whose repertoire includes roles in works by G. Rossini, G. Donizetti, W. A. Mozart, J. S. Bach. Sekgapane was named the 30 Under 30 Europe 2018: Arts & Culture by Forbes magazine.

== Early life ==
Sekgapane was born in Kroonstad, South Africa. He graduated from the South African College of Music at the University of Cape Town.

== Participation in international vocal competitions ==
Sekgapane obtained the 1st prize at the International Hans Gabor Belvedere Singing Competition as well as the 1st prize at the Montserrat Caballé International Singing Competition in 2015. In the summer of 2017, he won the 1st prize at Plácido Domingo's Operalia, the World Opera Competition.

== Artistic activity ==
The singer's stage activity began in Chemnitz, Germany in 2014 when he sang the role of Don Ramiro in Rossini's La Cenerentola. During the season 2015/16, he became a member of the Young Ensemble of Semperoper in Dresden.

The following season he performed the roles of Don Ramiro, Count Almaviva (Il barbiere di Siviglia) and Lindoro, at Teatro Massimo in Palermo, Bavarian State Opera, Hamburg State Opera and Aalto-Musiktheater Essen. He also appeared at Royal Opera Copenhagen as Il Conte di Libenskof in a new production of Rossini's Il Viaggio a Reims (2017). Levy Sekgapane also performed at opera festivals such as the Rossini Opera Festival in Pesaro, the Whitsun Festival at State Theatre Wiesbaden, the international Donizetti Opera festival in Bergamo, Glyndebourne Festival, Salzburg Festival and Wexford Festival Opera.

On the concert stage, he gave his debut at Elbphilharmonie Hamburg singing at New Year's Eve gala. He took part in a concert dedicated to Maria Callas at Theatre Champs-Élysées in Paris and performed in the AIDS Gala concert hosted annually at Deutsche Oper Berlin to support HIV and AIDS.

== Repertoire ==
=== Opera roles ===
Role	Opera	Composer	Location
Count Almaviva	Il barbiere di Siviglia (The Barber of Seville)	G. Rossini	2019 - Teatro Massimo di Palermo 2019 - Glyndebourne Opera House 2019 - Opéra National de Bordeaux 2019 - Ópera Nacional de Chile, Santiago 2018 - Ópera de Las Palmas 2018 - Teatro del Maggio Musicale Fiorentino 2018 - Opéra National de Paris 2017/18 - Den Norske Opera, Oslo 2016/17 - Aalto-Musiktheater Essen 2016/17 - Deutsche Oper Berlin 2016 - Semperoper Dresden
Don Ramiro	La Cenerentola	G. Rossini	2020 - Bayerische Staatsoper, München 2019 - Opéra Royal de Wallonie, Liège 2017 - Bayerische Staatsoper, München 2016 - Staatsoper Hamburg
Selimo	Adina	G. Rossini	2019 - Wexford Festival Opera 2018 - Rossini Opera Festival, Pesaro
Conte di Libenskof	Il viaggio a Reims	G. Rossini	2017 - Gran Teatre del Liceu, Barcelona 2017 - Royal Danish Opera, København
Arbace	Idomeneo	W. A. Mozart	2019 - Salzburger Festspiele
Guido	Enrico di Borgogna	G. Donizetti	2018 - Teatro Donizetti Bergamo
Don Narciso	Il turco in Italia	G. Rossini	2018 - Staatsoper Hamburg
Ernesto	Don Pasquale	G. Donizetti	2018/19 - Latvian National Opera, Riga 2022 - Teatro Petruzzelli, Bari
Nemorino	L'elisir d'amore	G. Donizetti	2017/18 - Hessisches Staatstheater Wiesbaden
Lindoro	L'italiana in Algeri	G. Rossini	2017 - Teatro Massimo di Palermo
Albazar	Il turco in Italia	G. Rossini	2016 - Rossini Opera Festival, Pesaro

=== Concerts, recitals ===
Year	Event	Orchestra, conductor, pianist	Location
2019	Messa di Gloria, G. Rossini	Insula orchestra, Speranza Scappucci,	La Seine Musicale, Paris
2019	Machaidze & Sekgapane – Italian operatic gems concert	Copenhagen Philharmonic Orchestra, Patrick Lange	Tivoli Concert Hall, Copenhagen
2019	"Korchak and friends" concert for the 40th birthday of Dmitry Korczak	Musica Viva Orchestra, Dmitry Korchak / Konstantin Chudovsky	Moscow Concert Hall Zaryadye (Зарядье)
2018	Maria Callas: The tribute concert	Lamoureux Orchestra, Yvan Cassar	Theatre Champs-Élysées, Paris
2018	Riga Opera Festival Gala Concert	Latvian National Opera Orchestra, Ozoliņš / Vaicis / Veismanis	Latvian National Opera, Riga
2017	New Year's Eve gala concert with Olga Peretyatko	NDR Elbphilharmonie Orchestra, James Conlon	Elbphilharmonie, Hamburg
2017	Duet Gala Concert	Cape Town Philharmonic Orchestra, Tim Murray	Artscape Opera House, Artscape Theatre Centre, Cape Town
2017	Recital at La Motte Wine Estate	Albie van Schalkwyk (piano)	La Motte Wine Estate, Cape Town
2017	Recital at the CPH Opera Festival	Leif Greibe (piano)	Børssalen, Copenhagen
2016	23 Festive Opera Gala (for the German AIDS Foundation)	[information needed]	Deutsche Oper, Berlin
2016	Rossini Gala, the Verdi Symphonic Season	Orchestra Sinfonica di Milano Giuseppe Verdi, Jader Bignamini	Auditorium di Milano, Milan
