= Richard Cameron-Wolfe =

American composer and pianist

Richard Cameron-Wolfe is an American composer and pianist.

== Early life and education ==
Cameron-Wolfe was born in Cleveland, Ohio. He studied at Oberlin Conservatory of Music and Indiana University School of Music with Joseph Battista and Menahem Pressler (piano) and Bernhard Heiden, Iannis Xenakis, Juan Orrego-Salas, and John Eaton (composition).

== Career ==
Before moving to New York City, he taught at Indiana University, Radford College (Virginia), and the University of Wisconsin-Milwaukee. In New York he performed and composed for several major ballet and modern dance companies, including the Joffrey Ballet and the Jose Limon Company. He then taught music theory and history, composition, and music resources for choreographers at Purchase College, State University of New York from 1978-2002. His ideas on the intersection between choreography and music are cited in Oxford's volume Gestures of Music Theater: The Performativity of Song and Dance. He composed the libretto or the opera Los Caminos del Paxos with Arturio Arias.

Since 1989 Cameron-Wolfe has been a frequent guest of music schools and festivals in Russia and former Soviet nations and a promoter of the exchange of musical ideas, scores and performances between those the countries and the US. He has also acted as co-editor of FULCRAM: an annual of poetry and aesthetics.

As a pianist, Cameron-Wolfe frequently performs the music of Dane Rudhyar in the United States, Sweden, Finland, The Netherlands, Russia, Azerbaijan, and Bulgaria. Unusually, he has given four uninterrupted solo performances of Satie’s 24-hour Vexations." Cameron-Wolfe also performs the works of lesser-played composers of the early 20th century who provided the transition from late Romanticism into post-World War II "sound art". His current repertoire includes works by Leo Ornstein, his mentor Dane Rudhyar, and Charles Ives.

== Compositions ==
- as he seemed to appear to the beast in the distance … (activities for percussionist)
- ARQ: Region III Refuge - piano 4-hands, violin
- Code of Unsilence: A Prayer - piano
- Heretic (Micro Opera for Guitarist)
- Kyrie (Mantra) - flute trio
- Labyrinths - high voice, cello, piano
- Lapis Lazuli - fl/alto flute; piano
- Le Pont des Ames - piano, string orchestra
- Lilith - violin, piano
- Lonesome Dove - a true story (for saxophone, dancer, and stagehand)
- A Measure of Love and Silence
- MeMarie (micro-opera for soprano alone)
- Reconciliation - ob/eng hn, Bb/Eb cl, bsn, hn, tbn, 2 vln, vla, 2 vcl,
- Roerich Rhapsody—Liaison - cello, piano
- Sacre-Lege - fl, cl, vln, vcl, perc
- A Song Built from Fire (for singing pianist)
- Time Refracted - cello, piano
- Variations and Liebestod - unaccompanied clarinet

== Discography ==
- Burning Questions
- Paris-X
