= Open Sound Control =

Protocol for multimedia devices

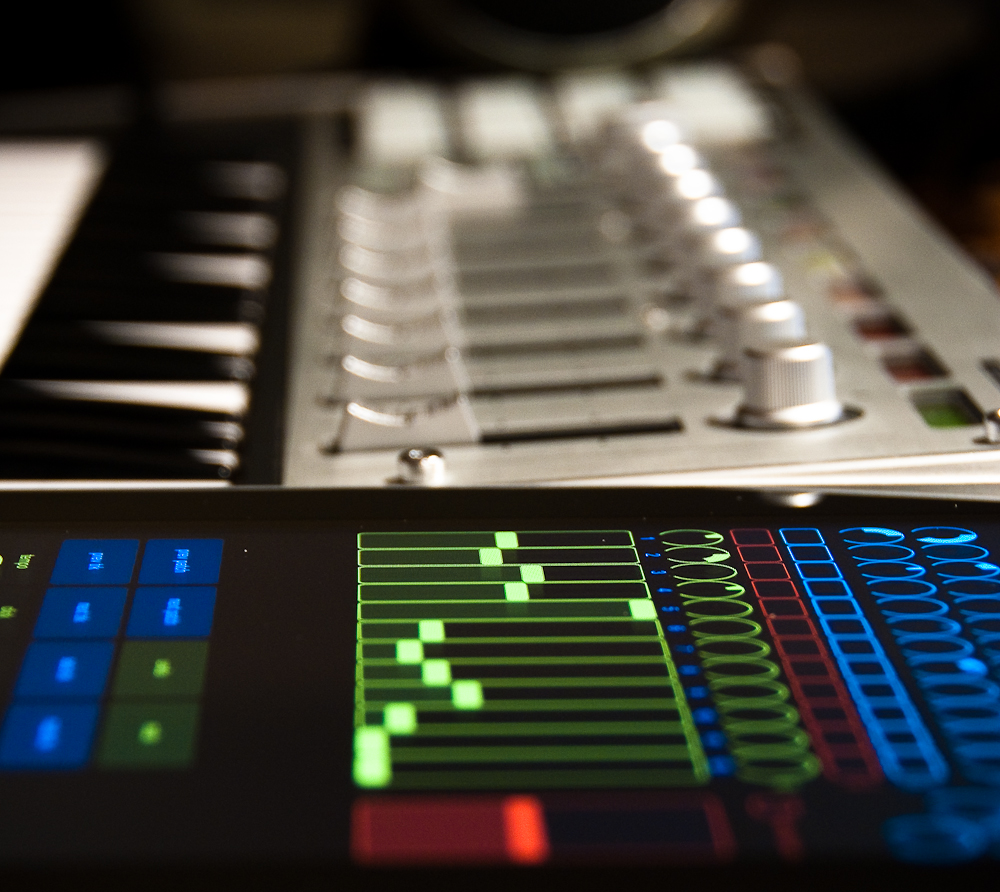
iPad running TouchOSC

Open Sound Control (OSC) is a protocol for networking sound synthesizers, computers, and other multimedia devices for purposes such as musical performance or show control. OSC's advantages include interoperability, accuracy, flexibility, and detailed documentation. Its disadvantages include higher bandwidth requirements and load on embedded processors relative to alternatives such as MIDI, as well as a lack of standardized messages across different devices. The first specification was released in March 2002.

== Motivation ==
OSC is a content format developed at CNMAT by Adrian Freed and Matt Wright comparable to XML, WDDX, or JSON. It was originally intended for sharing music performance data (gestures, parameters and note sequences) between musical instruments (especially electronic musical instruments such as synthesizers), computers, and other multimedia devices. OSC is sometimes used as an alternative to the 1983 MIDI standard, when higher resolution and a richer parameter space is desired. OSC messages are transported across the internet and within local subnets using UDP/IP and Ethernet. OSC messages between gestural controllers are usually transmitted over serial endpoints of USB wrapped in the SLIP protocol.

== Features ==
OSC's main features, compared to MIDI, include:

- Open-ended, dynamic, URI-style symbolic naming scheme
- Symbolic and high-resolution numeric data
- Pattern matching language to specify multiple recipients of a single message
- High resolution time tags
- "Bundles" of messages whose effects must occur simultaneously

== Applications ==
There are dozens of OSC applications, including real-time sound and media processing environments, web interactivity tools, software synthesizers, programming languages and hardware devices. OSC has achieved wide use in fields including musical expression, robotics, video performance interfaces, distributed music systems and inter-process communication.

The TUIO community standard for tangible interfaces such as multitouch is built on top of OSC. Similarly the GDIF system for representing gestures integrates OSC.

OSC is used extensively in experimental musical controllers, and has been built into several open source and commercial products.

The Open Sound World (OSW) music programming language is designed around OSC messaging.

OSC is the heart of the DSSI plugin API, an evolution of the LADSPA API, in order to make the eventual GUI interact with the core of the plugin via messaging the plugin host. LADSPA and DSSI are APIs dedicated to audio effects and synthesizers.

In 2007, a standardized namespace within OSC called SYN, for communication between controllers, synthesizers and hosts, was proposed.

== Design ==
OSC messages consist of an address pattern (such as /oscillator/4/frequency), a type tag string (such as ,fi for a float32 argument followed by an int32 argument), and the arguments themselves (which may include a time tag). Address patterns form a hierarchical name space, reminiscent of a Unix filesystem path, or a URL, and refer to "Methods" inside the server, which are invoked with the attached arguments. Type tag strings are a compact string representation of the argument types. Arguments are represented in binary form with four-byte alignment. The core types supported are

- 32-bit two's complement signed integers
- 32-bit IEEE floating point numbers
- Null-terminated arrays of eight-bit encoded data (C-style strings)
- arbitrary sized blob (e.g. audio data, or a video frame)

An example message is included in the spec (with null padding bytes represented by ␀): /oscillator/4/frequency␀,f␀␀, Followed by the 4-byte float32 representation of 440.0: 0x43dc0000.

Messages may be combined into bundles, which themselves may be combined into bundles, etc. Each bundle contains a timestamp, which determines whether the server should respond immediately or at some point in the future.

Applications commonly employ extensions to this core set. More recently some of these extensions such as a compact Boolean type were integrated into the required core types of OSC 1.1.

The advantages of OSC over MIDI are primarily internet connectivity; data type resolution; and the comparative ease of specifying a symbolic path, as opposed to specifying all connections as seven-bit numbers with seven-bit or fourteen-bit data types. This human-readability has the disadvantage of being inefficient to transmit and more difficult to parse by embedded firmware, however.

The spec does not define any particular OSC Methods or OSC Containers. All messages are implementation-defined and vary from server to server.
