= Barbara Jazwinski =

American composer and pianist

Barbara Jazwinski is a Polish-American composer and pianist known for her contributions to contemporary music. She is Head of the Composition Program at the Newcomb Music Department, Tulane University in New Orleans. She was honored with the Prince Pierre of Monaco Composition Award for her work on the Sextet, and she also secured the top position in the Nicola De Lorenzo Composition Contest for her composition of Music for Chamber Orchestra.

== Education ==
She studied composition and theory at the Fryderyk Chopin Academy of Music in Warsaw and earned her M.A. in composition and piano from Stanford University and her Ph.D. in composition from the City University of New York.

== Career ==
Jazwinski's music has been selected for programming at Diffrazioni Multimedia Festival in Florence, the London Festival of American Music, Laboratorium Muzyki Wspolczesnej in Poland, Washington Square Contemporary Music Series, the New York University New Music Ensemble, and the International Music by Women Festival in Oxford, Mississippi.

Her works have been performed or recorded by ensembles and organizations such as the Royal Scottish National Orchestra, the Polish Radio and TV Orchestra of Cracow, the Koszalin Philharmonic, the New Orleans Chamber Orchestra, Shenson Recital Series at Stanford, Klassik & Elektronik Music Play in Berlin, and the Filarmonica de Stat Banatul in Timișoara, Romania, The ISCM Virtual Collaborative Series, International Double Reed Conference, International Clarinet Association.

Since 1988, she has served as the Music Director of Spectri Sonori, an acclaimed concert series dedicated to contemporary music.

== Selected works ==
Jazwinski's music is published by the American Composers Edition.

- Wind Shadows for bassoon and piano
- She is a [dancer] for the SATB choir and piano
- Dreams of Vagabond Winds for oboe, clarinet, and bassoon
- Dreams interrupted... for guitar solo
- Blue Waltz for Youth Symphony Orchestra
- Shadows in Shades of Blue for flute, clarinet, violin, cello, and piano
- The Girl by the Ocean, for baritone and piano
- Soliloquy, for clarinet solo
- Designs in Blue Shadows for piano solo
- Blue Shadows for flute, clarinet, and piano
- Images in Blue for the saxophone quartet
- Blue Tango for oboe, clarinet, saxophone, and bassoon
- Quintet for flute, oboe, clarinet, bassoon, and piano
- Fantasy on Jazz for clarinet solo and symphony orchestra
- Winter Dreams for flute, clarinet, violin, cello, piano, and percussion
- Sequenze Concertanti, for string orchestra
- Stryga for symphony orchestra
- Concerto for Violoncello and Chamber Orchestra
- To the Evening Star for soprano, flute, clarinet, violin, and piano
- Visions for clarinet solo
- Invocations for violin, cello, and piano
- Incantations for violin solo
- The Seventh Night of the Seventh Moon for soprano, clarinet, and piano
- Sextet for flute (a. fl.), clarinet (b. cl.), trumpet, double bass, and percussion
- String Trio
- Cantique de Saint-Jean for chorus and symphony orchestra
- Dialoghi for piano solo
- Three Miniatures for Flute and Piano

== Selected discography ==
- Fantasy on Jazz (NV6519)
- The Girl by the Ocean (Lorelt 143)
- Stryga for symphony orchestra (VMM 3002)
- Visions for clarinet solo (CPS 8641, CPS 8668)
- Winter Dreams for flute, clarinet, violin, cello, piano, and percussion (CPS 8630)
- Images in Blue for saxophone quartet (RR 7805)
- Sequenze Concertanti (VMM 3024)
- Blue Tango (MGB CD 6213)

=== Virtual albums ===
- Various Artists – Designs in Blue Shadows (Chamber Music of Barbara Jazwinski)
- Fantasy on Jazz, transcription for clarinet and piano
- Visions for clarinet solo
- Designs in Blue Shadows
- Dialoghi
- Soliloquy for clarinet solo
- Incantations
- Invocations

== Selected publications ==
- Jazwinski, B. M. (1984). Four Compositions by Tadeusz Baird: An Analytic Essay. City University of New York.
- Winston, J. L., Jazwinski, B. M., Corey, D. M., & Colombo, P. J. (2022). Music training, and the ability of musicians to harmonize, are associated with enhanced planning and problem-solving. Frontiers in Psychology, 12, 805186.
