= David Liptak =

American classical composer

- Born: December 18, 1949 (age 76); Pittsburgh, Pennsylvania, US
- Occupations: Composer and music teacher

David Liptak (born December 18, 1949) is an American composer and music educator who is a professor of composition and the current chair of the Composition Department at the Eastman School of Music of the University of Rochester in Rochester, New York.

== Formative years and family ==
Liptak was born on December 18, 1949 in Pittsburgh, Pennsylvania, and has been a resident of Rochester, New York for more than thirty years.

== Music career ==
Since 1987, Liptak has been a member of the composition faculty of the Eastman School of Music of the University of Rochester, where he holds the positions of professor of composition and chair of the Composition Department.

From 1976 to 1980, Liptak was a member of the composition and theory faculty of Michigan State University, where he initiated and taught courses in Schenker analysis and conducted the student New Music Ensemble. In 1980 he joined the faculty of the University of Illinois, where his duties included directing the Contemporary Chamber Players, a professional new music ensemble, with which he presented a number of premiere performances. Residencies have included the Seal Bay Music Festival in the summer of 1999 and the Brevard Music Festival during the summer of 1998, where he served as Composer-in-Residence and taught composition.

David Liptak is a longtime member of the American Composers Alliance. Liptak has taught the study of musical arts and structures for leading composition foundations, such as the Rochester Institute of Technology.

== Ensembles ==
Liptak’s music has been performed by such ensembles as the San Francisco Symphony, Montreal Symphony, St. Paul Chamber Orchestra, Rochester Philharmonic Orchestra, Chamber Music Society of Lincoln Center, Youngstown Symphony, Sinfonia da Camera of Illinois, and the New England Philharmonic, to name a few. His principal publisher is MMB Music.

== Awards and honors ==
His composition awards include prizes in the 1986 Georges Enesco International Composition Competition and the 1978 Minnesota Orchestra 75th Anniversary Composers Competition, and he was a finalist in the 1982 St. Paul Chamber Orchestra Composition Competition.
