= Robert Moffat Palmer =

American classical composer (1915–2010)

Robert Moffat (variously "Moffatt" and "Moffett") Palmer (b. June 2, 1915, Syracuse, New York; d. July 3, 2010, Ithaca, New York) was an American composer, pianist and educator. He composed more than 90 works, including two symphonies, Nabuchodonosor (an oratorio), a piano concerto, four string quartets, three piano sonatas and numerous works for chamber ensembles.

== Biography ==
=== Education ===
Born in Syracuse, New York, Palmer began, at age 12, piano studies with his mother. He attended Syracuse's Central High School, undertaking pre-college studies in piano and additional study of violin and music theory at the Syracuse Music School Settlement. Awarded a piano scholarship to the Eastman School of Music, he soon became a composition major. At Eastman, he studied with Howard Hanson and Bernard Rogers, earning bachelor's (1938) and master's (1940) degrees in composition. He undertook additional studies with Quincy Porter, Roy Harris and, at the first composition class at the Tanglewood Music Center in 1940, with Aaron Copland.

=== Early career ===
Palmer came to national attention in an article titled "Robert Palmer and Charles Mills" published in 1943 by critic Paul Rosenfeld in Modern Music. Rosenfeld hails two "new, impressive, distinctive works" by Palmer," noting "an impression of robustness and maturity." In the Concerto for Small Orchestra (1940), Rosenfeld discerns a "quite original opening movement, (whose) clash of melodies in contrary motion was magnificent and fierce," signaling "a new composer to be watched with happy expectation."

Further national attention came with the publication in 1948 by Aaron Copland of an article in the New York Times titled "The New 'School' of American Composers." Copland's article singles out Palmer as one of seven composers "representative of some of the best we have to offer the new generation," adding that "Palmer happens to be one of my own particular enthusiasms." In Palmer's first two string quartets, Copland discerns "separate movements of true originality and depth of feeling," observing that "always his music has urgency—it seems to come from some inner need for expression."

Early in his career, Palmer taught music theory, composition and piano at the University of Kansas from 1940 until 1943.

=== Later career ===
From 1943 until his retirement in 1980, Palmer served as a member of the faculty at Cornell University, where he was appointed Given Foundation Professor of Music in 1976. According to Pulitzer Prize-winning composer Steven Stucky, chair of the board of directors of the American Music Center and a former Palmer student, "(Palmer) founded the doctoral program in music composition at Cornell University, which was the first in the United States (and quite possibly the world)." Writing in Clavier magazine in 1989, pianist Ramon Salvatore observed that "[Palmer's] influence on two generations of Cornell composers has been enormous; many of his former students now hold university and college professorships throughout the United States" Additionally, Palmer served as visiting composer at Illinois Wesleyan University in 1954 and as the George A. Miller Professor of Composition at the University of Illinois Urbana-Champaign in 1955-56.

Many of Palmer's most distinctive works date from his Cornell period. Steven Stucky remarks that Palmer "once seemed poised to become a leading national figure. A steady stream of first-rate pieces attracted top performers in concert and on recordings: the Second Piano Sonata (1942; 1948), championed by John Kirkpatrick; Toccata Ostinato (1945), a boogie-woogie in 13/8 written for pianist William Kapell; the first Piano Quartet (1947); the Chamber Concerto No. 1 (1949); the Quintet for Clarinet, Piano, and Strings (1952). Most influential of these was the mighty Piano Quartet, which used to loom large as one of the major accomplishments of American chamber music."

Echoing this assessment, Robert Evett, in a review written in 1970 for the Washington Evening Star of Palmer's first Piano Quartet (1947), found it "one of the most engrossing works of a superb American composer. ... At its premiere, it was a triumph. It was a triumph again last night."

Palmer's publishers include Elkan-Vogel, Peer International, C. F. Peters Corporation, G. Schirmer Inc., Valley Music Press, and Alphonse Leduc-Robert King, Inc. Palmer's students include Pulitzer Prize-winning composers Steven Stucky and Christopher Rouse and composers Paul Chihara, Bernhard Heiden, Brian Israel, Ben Johnston, David Conte, John S. Hilliard, Leonard Lehrman, Daniel Dorff, Jerry Amaldev, James Marra, Harris Lindenfeld, and Jack Gallagher. See: List of music students by teacher: N to Q#Robert Moffat Palmer.

== Style and reception ==
Elliott Carter, writing for Modern Music about an early-1940s League of Composers performance of Palmer's String Quartet No. 1 (1939), reported that "Palmer, a hitherto unheard-from composer, was the big surprise of the whole concert series. His music is firm and definite; its dissonance resembles that of younger Europeans whom we never hear in this country... His quartet showed an impressive seriousness and great musicality."

William Austin, writing in 1956 in The Musical Quarterly, observes that "through recordings and published scores... [Palmer's] fairly large but scattered audience can now confirm the predictions of Paul Rosenfeld and Aaron Copland that Palmer would rank among the leading musical representatives of his generation." Austin notes "the works [Palmer] creates are taut and sturdy" and cites as characteristic Palmer's use of asymmetrical rhythm and meter, the octatonic scale, "imitative counterpoint" and "expansion of phrases by varied repetition." Austin holds that "Palmer sings with a kind of devout serenity" of the "grim, divided, disappointed world of the 1940s and '50s, doggedly refusing to despair, no matter how often its hopes for liberty, equality and fraternity must be deferred. . . His best music ranks with the best means available for all who share this outlook."

The previous year (1955), Herbert Livingston described the premiere performance of Palmer's String Quartet No. 3 at the University of Michigan as "the most recent addition to the distinguished series of works commissioned by the University for the Stanley Quartet (others cited by Livingston included quartets and quintets by Walter Piston, Quincy Porter, Wallingford Riegger, Darius Milhaud, and Heitor Villa-Lobos). It is both a significant contribution to the repertory of contemporary American chamber music and a work that reveals new developments in the composer's style." Livingston adds, "every refinement of its complex structure contributes positively to the expressiveness of the music."

The premiere performance in 1963 of Palmer's oratorio, Nabuchodonosor, lasting 40 minutes, was greeted by The Musical Quarterly's William C. Holmes as "a culminating point in Robert Palmer's more than twenty-five years as an active composer... It is his largest and most ambitiously conceived work to date. It is a forceful, rough-hewn cry of defiance against tyranny in all forms and, as such, cannot help but move anyone who shares Palmer's views on this subject." Holmes takes note of "the exciting forcefulness that carries one with it to the climax" and of the coda that follows—intended, says Holmes, "to convey a serene greeting of peace to mankind."

Arthur Cohn, surveying four works by Palmer in The Literature of Chamber Music (1997), detects "brilliant contrapuntalism" in Palmer's "vitally communicative music." Cohn notes that "in Palmer's hands repetition is always paralleled by change" and finds "positive tonalism, broadened and colored by contemporary expansion" in the music of "this American composer of virile voice."

In a eulogy written in 2010 for the American Music Center, AMC chair of the board of directors and former Palmer student Steven Stucky noted that "Austin captures the grave lyricism that makes Palmer memorable, but no less important was his lively rhythmic language, which owed a debt in equal parts to American vernacular music, jazz, and Renaissance polyphony." Stucky concludes that "Palmer's music is ripe for rediscovery by a wider public, and it lives on in those who knew him, and those who celebrate him now for a life well and generously lived."

According to Daniel Aioi, Palmer's "body of work resides at Cornell in the Sidney Cox Library of Music and Dance and in the University Archives in Olin Library."

== Commissioned works ==
- Concerto for Small Orchestra (1940); commissioned by CBS and the League of Composers
- Second String Quartet (1943; rev. 1947); commissioned by the Sergei Koussevitzky Music Foundation
- Variations, Chorale and Fugue for orchestra (1947; rev. 1954); commissioned by Dimitri Mitropoulos and the Minneapolis Symphony
- Quintet for Piano and Strings (1950); commissioned by the Elizabeth Sprague Coolidge Foundation
- Quintet for Clarinet, Piano and Strings (1952; rev. 1953); commissioned by the Quincy, Illinois Chamber Music Society
- String Quartet No. 3 (1954); commissioned by the Stanley Foundation of the University of Michigan
- Of Night and the Sea (1956); commissioned by the Paul Fromm Music Foundation
- Memorial Music (1960); commissioned by the National Association of Educational Broadcasters
- Centennial Overture (1965); commissioned by Cornell University and Lincoln Center for the Performing Arts
- Quartet No. 2 for Piano and Strings (1974); commissioned by the Galzio Quartet, Caracas, Venezuela
- Piano Sonata No. 3 (1979); commissioned by Ramon Salvatore
- Cello Sonata No. 2 (1983); commissioned by the Hans Kindler Foundation, Washington, DC

== Notable performances ==
- Piano Sonata No. 1 (1938) premiered March 26, 1940 in New York by pianist John Kirkpatrick
- Concerto for Small Orchestra (1940) premiered in 1941 by the CBS Orchestra
- Toccata Ostinato (1944) for piano commissioned, premiered, dedicated to and recorded by William Kapell
- Quartet for Piano and Strings (1947) Premiered in 1947 by John Kirkpatrick, pianist, and members of the Walden Quartet
- Quintet for Piano and Strings (1950) premiered in 1951 at the Library of Congress by the Juilliard String Quartet and pianist Erich Itor Kahn
- String Quartet No. 3 (1954) premiered July 12, 1955 by the Stanley Quartet at the University of Michigan
- Centennial Overture (1965) premiered March 12, 1965 at Lincoln Center for the Performing Arts and broadcast nationally by the New York Philharmonic Orchestra conducted by George Cleve.
- Organon II (1975), for string orchestra, premiered April 4, 1975 by the Rochester Philharmonic Orchestra conducted by David Zinman.

== Awards ==
- National Academy of Arts and Letters, 1946
- Guggenheim Fellowship, 1952
- Guggenheim Fellowship, 1960
- Fulbright Grant, 1960
- National Endowment for the Arts grant, 1980

== Compositions ==
=== Orchestral ===
- Poem for violin and chamber orchestra (1938)
- Concerto for Small Orchestra (1940)
- K 19, symphonic elegy for Thomas Wolfe
- Variations, Chorale and Fugue (1947; rev. 1954)
- Chamber Concerto for violin, oboe and string orchestra (1949)
- Symphony No. 1 (1953)
- Memorial Music (1960)
- Centennial Overture (1965)
- Symphony No. 2 (1966)
- Piano Concerto (1971)
- Symphonia concertante for nine instruments (1972)
- Organon II for string orchestra (1975)
- Concerto for two pianos, two percussion, strings and brass (1984)

=== Wind ensemble ===
- Choric Song and Toccata (1968)

=== Choral ===
- Abraham Lincoln Walks at Midnight for chorus and orchestra (1948)
- Slow, Slow, Fresh Fount for SATB chorus (1953; rev. 1959)
- The Trojan Women for women's chorus, winds and percussion (1955)
- And in That Day for chorus (1963)
- Nabuchodonosor for tenor and bass soloists, TTBB chorus, winds, percussion, and two pianos (1964)
- Portents of Aquarius for narrator, SATB chorus and organ (1975)

=== Chamber ensemble ===
- String Quartet No. 1 (1939)
- Concerto for five instruments (1943)
- String Quartet No. 2 (1943; rev. 1947)
- Piano Quartet No. 1 (1947)
- Piano Quintet (1950)
- Sonata for viola and piano (1951)
- Quintet for clarinet, string trio, and piano (1952; rev. 1953)
- String Quartet No. 3 (1954)
- Sonata for violin and piano (1956)
- Piano Trio (1958)
- String Quartet No. 4 (1960)
- Organon I for flute and clarinet (1962)
- Sonata for trumpet and piano (1972)
- Piano Quartet No. 2 (1974)
- Organon II for violin and viola (1975)
- Sonata No. 1 for cello and piano (1978)
- Sonata No. 2 for cello and piano (1983)

=== Vocal ===
- Two Songs (Walt Whitman) for voice and piano (1940)
- ' 'Kaw River' ' (Will Gibson) for soprano and piano (1943)
- Carmina Amoris for soprano, clarinet, violin and piano (1951)
- Of Night and the Sea, chamber cantata for soprano and bass soloists and orchestra (1956)

=== Keyboard ===
- Piano Sonata No. 1 (1938; rev. 1946)
- Three Preludes for piano (1941)
- Piano Sonata No. 2 (1942; rev. 1948)
- Sonata for two pianos (1944)
- Toccata Ostinato for piano (1944)
- Sonata for piano four hands (1952)
- Evening Music for piano (1956)
- Seven Epigrams for piano (1957)
- Epithalamium for organ (1968)
- Morning Music for piano (1973)
- ' 'Transitions' ' for piano (1977)* Piano Sonata No. 3 (1979)

== Sources ==
- Aioi, Daniel. "Retired music professor Robert Palmer dies at age 95", Cornell Chronicle Online, July 8, 2010. Retrieved 2011-06-07.
- Anderson, E. Ruth. "Palmer, Robert M." Contemporary American Composers: A Biographical Dictionary (Boston: G. K. Hall, 1976), ISBN 978-0-8161-1117-6. Digitized by the Internet Archive, 2010. Retrieved 2011-05-15.
- Austin, William. "The Music of Robert Palmer", The Musical Quarterly, Vol. 42, No. 1 (Jan. 1956), pp. 35–50.
- Austin, William W. 1986. "Palmer, Robert (Moffat)". The New Grove Dictionary of American Music, Vol. 3, edited by H. Wiley Hitchcock and Stanley Sadie. London: Macmillan.
- Austin, William W. 2001. "Palmer, Robert (Moffett)". The New Grove Dictionary of Music and Musicians, edited by Stanley Sadie and John Tyrrell. London: Macmillan.
- Austin, William W., Music in the 20th Century (NY: W. W. Norton, 1966), ISBN 978-0-393-09704-7, p. 441.
- Cohn, Arthur. The Literature of Chamber Music (Chapel Hill, NC: Hinshaw Music, 1997), ISBN 978-0-937276-16-7, Vol. 3, pp. 2067–2069.
- Copland, Aaron. "The New School of American Composers", The New York Times, March 4, 1948.
- Ewen, David. American Composers: A Biographical Dictionary (NY: Putnam, 1982), ISBN 978-0-399-12626-0, pp. 487–489.
- Holmes, William C. "Current Chronicle", The Musical Quarterly, Vol. 50, No. 3 (Jul. 1964), pp. 367–370.
- Livingston, Herbert. "Current Chronicle", The Musical Quarterly, Vol. 41, No. 4 (Oct. 1955), pp. 511–514.
- "Robert M. Palmer", Ithaca Journal obituary, Robert M. Palmer Obituary: View Robert Palmer's Obituary by Ithaca Journal July 5–7, 2010. Retrieved 2011-06-07.
- Rosenfeld, Paul. "Robert Palmer and Charles Mills", Modern Music, XX, May–June 1943, pp. 264–266.
- Salvatore, Raymond. "The Piano Music of Robert Palmer", Clavier, April 1989, Vol. 28, No. 4: 22–30.
- Slonimsky, Nicholas. 1958. "Palmer, Robert." Baker's Biographical Dictionary of Musicians, 5th ed. (NY: G. Schirmer, 1958), pp. 1203–1204.
- Stucky, Steven. "Remembering Robert Moffat Palmer (1915-2010)."
