= Brian Israel =

American composer, pianist & conductor

Brian Israel (February 5, 1951 - May 7, 1986), was an American composer, pianist, and conductor. He was a faculty member of the Syracuse University School of Music from 1975 until his death, at age 35, from leukemia. He left a large number of symphonic, chamber, and solo works, several of which have been recorded for Spectrum, Redwood, Pro-Viva, Innova Records, and Albany Records. "His music is marked by extreme contrasts in tempo and mood, often following a witty or downright funny movement with one that is deadly serious."

In his honor, the Syracuse Society for New Music awards the Brian Israel Prize every year to an emerging New York State composer. In addition, Syracuse University gives the Brian Israel Award each year to a deserving student composer at the university.

== Biography ==
A native of the Bronx, New York, Brian Israel studied with Lawrence Widdoes, Ulysses Kay, Robert Moffat Palmer, Burrill Phillips and Karel Husa. He received his MFA and DMA degrees from Cornell University, and joined the Syracuse University School of Music faculty upon completion of his graduate studies. He remained at Syracuse University until his death from leukemia at age 35.

A prolific composer, he won several awards and received numerous commissions, among them a commission from the Society for New Music. Several of his works have been recorded on Spectrum, Redwood, and Pro-Viva. His "Concerto for Clarinet and Wind Ensemble" is regarded as his "most original creation," according to composer Daniel Godfrey in a 1986 interview. The movement titles are "Crystalnacht," "Coronach" and "Liberation." As a pianist, composer, and conductor, he performed with numerous ensembles, including, for many years, the Society for New Music.

Other notable works include a Piano Quartet (1984), his String Quartet No. 2 ("Music for the Next to Die"), and his final work: Symphony No. 6, for soprano, baritone, and orchestra, with texts from the Bible and Langston Hughes.

== Recordings ==
- String Quartet #2 ("Music for the Next to Die"). Included on the album Society for New Music, Spectrum Records, 1984 (SR-183)
- In Praise of Practically Nothing. Included on the album Eastman American Music Series, Vol.6, Albany Records, 1999 (Troy 277)
- String Quartet #2 ("Music for the Next to Die"). Included on the CD boxed-set American Masters for the 21st Century, Society for New Music, Innova (616), 2004
- Sonatinetta for Mandolin and Guitar. Included on the album American Music for Mandolin and Guitar, by Duetto Gioconda, Querstand/Forte, 2007.
