= Joseph Dangerfield =

American musician (born 1977)

Joseph Dangerfield (born 1977) is a composer, pianist, and conductor who has lived and worked professionally in Germany, Holland, Russia, and the United States. In 2022 Dangerfield taught band and music at Woodrow Wilson High School in West Virginia.

He studied composition at Bowling Green State University with Marilyn Shrude, and Mikel Kuehn, and University of Iowa (PhD 2005) as a student of David Gompper. He was awarded a Fulbright Award to the Moscow Conservatory, where he served as composer-in-residence with the Ensemble Studio New Music, and to Maastricht Conservatory. He later performed as part of a group called The Leviathan Trio, with whom he toured China.

Dangerfield's music is published by PIP Press Music Publications, European American Music and is available on Albany Records.

== Composition ==
Dangerfield has said he considers himself "primarily a composer", and he has published compositions for piano as well as for ensembles. A review of Duo XXI's record, Quest, described his piece Nomina sunt omina as commanding and inspired by ritual. A review in Fanfare of one of his earlier compositions noted the inspiration of his mentor, David Gompper.

== Sources ==
- Official website
