= Charles Mills (composer) =

American composer (1914–1982)

Charles Mills (January 8, 1914 – March 7, 1982) was an American composer and music critic. A skilled woodwind player with a background as a jazz musician in his young adulthood, he was a prolific composer for the recorder and produced six symphonies. His compositions also included fugues, sonatas and concerti among other traditional forms of classical music. He was heavily influenced by Baroque music, and blended Baroque contrapuntal style with American idioms. While mainly a classical composer, he also wrote some pieces for jazz ensemble.

== Life and career ==
Charles Mills was born in Asheville, North Carolina on January 8, 1914. A self taught musician, he began earning a living as a musician in jazz bands at the age of 17. He worked as a saxophonist, clarinetist, and flute player. The music of his childhood, folk songs native to the Carolinas and African-American spirituals, later became influences in his adult compositions. He was also heavily influenced by the jazz of the dance orchestras he played in during the 1920s.

In 1933 Mills relocated to New York City where he initially studied music composition with Max Garfield. He subsequently studied with Aaron Copland from 1935 to 1937, Roger Sessions from 1937 to 1939, and Roy Harris from 1939 to 1941. He worked in New York as a critic for the quarterly journal Modern Music; focusing mainly on music on the radio, and was awarded a Guggenheim Fellowship in 1952. He taught on the faculty of the Manhattan School of Music where he was head of the composition department in 1954–1955.

Mills converted to Roman Catholicism and was baptized in that faith on May 14, 1944. He died in New York City on March 7, 1982.
