= TouchOSC =

- Developers: Hexler Heavy Industries, LLC
- Release: v1.0, 2008
- Stable release: v1.5.1 / June 11, 2026
- Written in: Lua
- Website: https://hexler.net/touchosc/releases

TouchOSC is a cross-platform application developed by Hexler Heavy Industries that allows users to create and use custom control surfaces for music, lighting, and multimedia systems. Designed for mobile devices and desktop platforms, it supports protocols such as OSC (Open Sound Control), MIDI, and serial communication, enabling real-time interaction with software and hardware.

== History ==
Mk1 of TouchOSC was released in 2008 as an app on the Apple App Store.

Mk2 was released 6 June 2021. With the introduction of Mk2 came scripts to allow users to customize templates using Lua.

The Ultimate Guide to TouchOSC tutorial series started by Tim Corpus in 2020 about how to use the platform is available on YouTube, along with a database of free templates on PatchStorage.

== Features ==
TouchOSC is capable of sending MIDI messages over WIFI, while also sending MIDI or OSC messages to multiple devices. To communicate over WIFI, the system uses the TouchOSC Bridge.

=== Software Integration ===
Many software programs communicate with TouchOSC including:

- Ableton Live
- Logic Pro
- Reaktor
- Reaper
