= Scott D. Miller =

Chief Executive Officer

- Born: 1955 or 1956 (age 70–71); United States
- Education: Stanford University and University of Chicago
- Occupation: Business executive

Scott D. Miller is an American business executive who is the Chairman of consulting firm SSA & Company, LLC. He was also a Special Advisor of General Atlantic and is a Director of AXA Financial, Inc. and MONY Life Insurance Co. of America, both of which are subsidiaries of AXA Group.

== Early life ==
Miller obtained his Bachelor's degree in Human Biology from Stanford University and his MBA in Finance from the University of Chicago.

== Past positions ==
He became the Executive Vice President of Hyatt Hotels Corporation in August 1997 and then served as the company's President and CEO until April 2003. Prior to Hyatt Hotels, Miller served as Partner in the John Buck Company from 1991 to 1993. From 1994 to 1997 he served as the Founding Partner, President, and CEO of United Infrastructure Company.

Miller's previous positions included terms on the boards of directors of Schindler Holding AG (started 2002), a director of Orbitz (started 2003), and an independent director of NAVTEQ (2004–2008), Armstrong World Industries (started 2006), and Affinion (2011–2013).
