= Gary Schneider =

South African-born American photographer (born 1954)

- Born: November 25, 1954 (age 71); East London, South Africa
- Education: Michaelis School of Fine Art, University of Cape Town (BFA); Pratt Institute (MFA)
- Occupation: Photographer
- Website: garyschneider.net

Gary Schneider (born November 25, 1954) is a South African-born American photographer known for his portraiture and self-portraits. According to the John Simon Guggenheim Memorial Foundation, which awarded him a Guggenheim Fellowship in 2013, his "early work in painting, performance, and film remain integral to his explorations of portraiture. He strives to marry art and science, identity and obscurity, figuration and abstraction, the carnal and the spiritual."

== Life and education ==
Gary Schneider was born in East London, South Africa and was raised in Cape Town. His BFA is from Michaelis School of Fine Art, University of Cape Town and his MFA is from Pratt Institute, Brooklyn.

When Schneider entered the University of Cape Town in 1975, conceptual art practices that used the body to examine phenomenology and behavior offered him a way to create and control his own space.

Schneider moved from South Africa to New York City in the late 1970s, where he worked for Richard Foreman's Ontological-Hysteric Theater. There he met John Erdman, his partner, who performed in conceptual film, video, and theater. They established Schneider/Erdman Inc. in 1981 "through which Schneider quickly rose to prominence as a master printer of other artists' photographs."

== Career ==
In 1977, Schneider had his first solo exhibition at Artists Space, where he did an installation and performance. Following the exhibition, he continued to make films; most notably Salters Cottages completed in 1981. A book of Salters Cottages film stills was published by Dashwood Books in 2019.

In 1998, he completed "Genetic Self-Portrait," a set of fifty-five photographs that form fourteen images of his own body. The work was exhibited in the Musée de l'Élysée in Lausanne, Switzerland as well as the International Center of Photography in New York City and the Massachusetts Museum of Contemporary Art. The book was published by Light Work, Syracuse in 1999.

"Portraits", a survey of his work, was mounted at Harvard Art Museums in 2004. It traveled to the Contemporary Museum in Honolulu. Yale Press published a fully illustrated catalog.

Aperture published his "Nudes" in 2005 and exhibited the life-size photographs in New York. The exhibition traveled to the Reykjavik Art Museum in 2010. A survey exhibition, "Flesh", was mounted by the Museum of Photographic Arts in San Diego in 2008.

"HandBook" is Schneider's 2010 artist book published by Aperture and printed by Schneider on a print-on-demand press. "Handbook, South African Artists", Schneider's Guggenheim Fellowship project, was published by Fourthwall Books in Johannesburg, South Africa in 2015.

== Solo museum exhibitions ==
- 1977: "Naming", installation and performance, Artist Space, New York, NY.
- 1997: "Recent Photographs", The Haggerty Museum, Marquette University, Milwaukee, WI.
- 1998: "Genetic Self-Portrait", Musee de l'Eysee de Lausanne, Lausanne, Switzerland.
- 2000: "Genetic Self-Portrait", International Center of Photography, New York, NY.
- 2003: "Genetic Self-Portrait", University Art Museum, SUNY, Albany, NY.
- 2003: "Genetic Self-Portrait", University Galleries, University of Florida, Gainesville, FL.
- 2004: "Biology", Suzanne H Arnold Art Gallery, Lebanon Valley College, Annville, PA.
- 2004: "Portraits", Harvard Art Museums, Cambridge, MA.
- 2004: "Portraits", Contemporary Museum, Honolulu, HI.
- 2005: "Nudes", Aperture Gallery, New York, NY.
- 2007: "Genetic Self-Portrait", The Warehouse Gallery, Syracuse, NY.
- 2007: "John 1989–2004", The Greenhouse Gallery, Guernsey, Channel Islands, UK.
- 2008: "Flesh: The Portraiture of Gary Schneider", Museum of Photographic Art, San Diego, CA.
- 2009: "Life@Life Size", Contemporary Art Galleries, University of Connecticut, Storrs, CT.
- 2010: "Nudes", Reykjavik Art Museum, Hafnarhus, Reykjavik, Iceland.
- 2018: "Analog Culture", Harvard Art Museums, Cambridge, MA.

== Awards and grants ==
- 2000: Alfred Eisenstaedt Award: Science and Technology, Photo Essay, Columbia University Journalism School and Life Magazine, New York, NY.
- 2004: National Endowment for the Arts Grant, "Gary Schneider: Portraits", Harvard University Art Museums, Boston, MA.
- 2004: AICA Award: Best Exhibition Mid Career Artist, International Association of Art Critics, Boston, MA.
- 2005: Lou Stoumen Prize, Museum of Photographic Arts, San Diego, CA.
- 2007: Guernsey Residency, Guernsey, Channel Islands, UK.
- 2007: Lead Award: Reportage, New York Times Magazine: "Microbesity-What Makes So Many Fat", Hamburg, Germany.
- 2007: Photo Annual Award: Magazine. New York Times Magazine: "Microbesity-What Makes So Many Fat", New York, NY.
- 2010: Photobook Award Kassel 2009/2010, Handbook, Kassel, Germany.
- 2010: Yaddo Artist Residency, Saratoga Springs, NY.
- 2013: John Simon Guggenheim Memorial Foundation Fellowship, New York, NY.
- 2014: Affiliated Fellow of the American Academy in Rome, Italy. Rutgers University, Mason Gross School of the Arts.
- 2015: Board of Trustees Research and Fellowship for Scholarly Excellence, Rutgers University, New Brunswick, NJ.
- 2016: Chancellor Scholar Award, Rutgers University, New Brunswick, NJ.

== Books and catalogs ==
- 1997: John in Sixteen Parts. Martin Kao, Deborah. Howard Yezerski Gallery, Boston, MA; Stephen Daiter Photography, Chicago, IL; PPOW Gallery, New York, NY.
- 1997: Recent Photographs. Carter, Dr. Curtis. The Haggerty Museum, Marquette University, Milwaukee, MI. Brochure.
- 1999: Genetic Self-Portrait. Essays by Ann Thomas, Lori Pauli, and Bettyann Kevles. Light Work, Syracuse, NY.
- 2001: Yezerski Family Portrait. Howard Yezerski Gallery, Boston, MA.
- 2004: Gary Schneider: Portraits. Martin Kao, Deborah. Yale University Press, New Haven, CT., in association with Harvard Art Museums, Cambridge, MA.
- 2005: Nudes. Aperture, New York, NY.
- 2007: John 1989–2004. Snell, Eric. The Greenhouse Gallery, Guernsey, Channel Islands, UK.
- 2010: HandBook, Aperture. New York, NY.
- 2012: Portrait Sequences 1975. OneStar Press, Paris, France.
- 2015: HandBook, South African Artists. Fourthwall Books, Johannesburg, South Africa.
- 2018: Analog Culture: Printer's Proofs from the Schneider/Erdman Photography Lab, editor Jennifer Quick, Harvard Art Museums, Cambridge, MA.
- 2019: Salters Cottages. Dashwood Books, New York, NY.

== Museum collections ==
Schneider's work is represented in many museums, including:

- Art Institute of Chicago
- Brooklyn Museum
- George Eastman Museum
- Harvard Art Museums
- Iziko South African National Gallery
- Metropolitan Museum of Art
- Musée de l'Élysée in Lausanne
- Museum of Fine Arts Boston
- Museum of Fine Art Houston
- National Gallery of Canada
- National Museum of African Art
- Reykjavik Art Museum
- Whitney Museum of American Art
- Yale University Art Gallery
