= Jose Simerilla Romero =

Argentinian-Spanish-American operatic tenor (born 1995)

- Born: 1995 (age 29–30); Buenos Aires, Argentina
- Occupation: Operatic tenor
- Website: josesimerillaromero.com

Jose Simerilla Romero (born 1995) is an Argentinian-Spanish-American operatic tenor. He has performed leading roles in opera houses such as Staatsoper Hannover, London Coliseum and Komische Oper Berlin. He has won prizes in prestigious international competitions such as the International Hans Gabor Belvedere Singing Competition in 2023 and the Chicago International Music Competition in 2021.

== Early life and education ==
Born in Buenos Aires, Argentina, he was immersed in a musical environment from a young age and grew up in a household filled with the sounds of classical music and opera. His passion for opera was nurtured by the influences of iconic tenors such as Mario Lanza, Jussi Björling, Franco Corelli, and The Three Tenors. His father, who possessed his own musical talents but never pursued a career as a singer due to family pressures, was a significant influence in Romero's decision to pursue music professionally.

Romero's formal musical education began in the United States, where his family moved when he was the age of six. He started his studies at Valencia College in Florida but, initially interested in graphic design, he soon shifted focus to music encouraged by his professors. He furthered his studies at Stetson University, where he completed a BA in Music Performance in 2018. While being a student in Stetson he received a call from Plácido Domingo who, impressed by Romero's audition video for Domingo's Operalia Competition, invited him to audition for the Domingo-Colburn-Stein Young Artist Program at the Los Angeles Opera. Despite being in the midst of his academic semester, Romero flew to Los Angeles for the audition and was accepted into the program, becoming one of the youngest singers ever to do so. He also participated in programs such as Houston Grand Opera's Young Artist Vocal Academy, the Dutch National Opera & Ballet Studio and the Carnegie Hall Weill Music Institute.

== Career ==
While a member of the LA Opera Young Artist Program, Romero made his LA Opera debut in the world premiere of Frédéric Chaslin’s Monte Cristo. In 2021 he sang the role of Alfredo in the Florida First Coast Opera's production of Verdi's La traviata. Also in 2021 he sang the role of Nemorino in L'elisir d'amore in a coproduction by Opera Zuid, Nederlandse Reisopera and Dutch National Opera, which was live-streamed by Opera Vision. In 2022 he sang as the Duke of Mantua in Rigoletto in his debut with Florida Grand Opera, which received considerable praise from critics.

In 2022 he joined the Staatsoper Hannover ensemble, where he performed various leading roles, including Rodolfo in La bohème (2022), Gvidon in The Tale of Tsar Saltan (2023), Lensky in Eugene Onegin (2024) and Nemorino in L'elisir d'amore (2024).

In 2023 he performed as Alfredo in La traviata with English National Opera and as Laërte in Hamlet in Komische Oper Berlin.

He has also performed in concert as Jaquino in Fidelio with Los Angeles Philharmonic under the baton of Gustavo Dudamel (2022) and as Shepherd in Oedipus rex with San Francisco Symphony (2022).

== Awards ==
- 2018 – First prize in the GLORY Int'l Romantic Music Competition (in both Romantic Music and Modern & Contemporary Music categories)
- 2021 – First prize in the Kyrenia Opera Vocal Competition
- 2021 – First prize in the Chicago International Music Competition
- 2021 – First prize in the Camerata Bardi International Vocal Competition
- 2021 – Munday Encouragement Award in the Jensen Foundation International Vocal Competition
- 2023 – Third prize in the International Hans Gabor Belvedere Singing Competition
