= Scott L. Miller =

American composer

Scott L. Miller (born 1966) is an American composer best known for his electroacoustic chamber music and ecosystemic performance pieces.

== Career ==
Miller's music is characterized by collaborative approaches to composition and the use of electronics, performer-computer improvisation and re-imagining ancient composing processes through the lens of 21st-century technology. Inspired by the inner workings of sound and the microscopic in the natural and mechanical worlds, he experiments and collaborates with musicians and performers who work in various styles.

His recent work experiments with virtual reality applications in live concerts. This was first realized in his composition Raba, created for the Tallinn, Estonia-based Ensemble U:. It is a collection of audio-visual music drawn from collaborations with six film and video artists.

Miller's ecosystemic works model the behavior of objects from the natural world in electronic sound, creating interactive sonic ecosystems. Ecosystemic pieces are the result of autonomous sounds competing with each other for sonic space.

Recordings of his music are available on New Focus Recordings, Innova, and other labels, many featuring his long-time collaborators, the new music ensemble Zeitgeist. His music is published by the American Composers Alliance, Tetractys, and Jeanné.

Miller is a professor of music at St. Cloud State University, Minnesota, where he teaches composition, electroacoustic music and theory. He is Past-President (2014–18) of the Society for Electro-Acoustic Music in the U.S. (SEAMUS) and presently director of SEAMUS Records. He holds degrees from the University of Minnesota, the University of North Carolina at Chapel Hill and the State University of New York at Oneonta, and studied composition at the Czech-American Summer Music Institute and the Centre de Création Musicale Iannis Xenakis.

Miller has been named a McKnight Composer Fellow three times (2001, 2013 and 2018), and was a Fulbright Scholar from 2014 to 2015. His work has been recognized by state, national, and international arts organizations, and has been reviewed and covered by journals including Computer Music Journal (MIT Press), New Music Box, and I Care if You Listen. He has been a featured artist at several festivals, including the Chicago Electro-Acoustic Music Festival (2019), the Lipa Festival (2017), and the Estonian Academy of Music's Autumn Festival, Sügisfest 2016.

== Discography as composer, performer ==
- Elegy, recorded on Trio Montecino, Eroica JDT3196, featuring David Shea, clarinet; Pablo Mahave-Veglia, violoncello; Paulina Zamora, piano. 2004
- Shape Shifting: Shades of Transformation, featuring Zeitgeist and Felip Costaglioli, recorded on Shape Shifting, Innova 638. 2005
- Pure Pleasure, recorded on EOS, featuring Patti Cudd. Innova 967. 2010
- And Thirty More, recorded on Here and Now, featuring Zeitgeist. Innova 799. 2011
- Devices & Desires, Carla Rees and Scott Miller. rarescale rr004. 2012-06-05
- Willful Devices, featuring Pat O’Keefe and Scott Miller. 2012-07-03
- Contents May Differ, recorded on Contents May Differ, featuring Pat O’Keefe. Innova 888. 2014
- Tipping Point, recorded on Music from SEAMUS vol. 20, featuring Zeitgeist. EAAM-2011. 2015-05-05
- Tipping Point, featuring Zeitgeist and Carrie Henneman Shaw. New Focus Recordings FCR161. 2015-05-12
- Avec Scott, recorded on Avec, featuring Émilie Girard-Charest. Kohlenstoff. 2016
- Diary of a Left-Handed Sleepwalker, featuring Three Free Radicals (Scott Miller and Mart Soo). Panoramic PAN04. 2016
- Every Problem is a Nail, recorded on The Electro-Acoustic Piano, Vol. 2, featuring Keith Kirchoff. Thinking Outloud. 2017-06-01
- bc+1[track_number++] = (laptop) scott_miller + bc; featuring Binary Canary (Kyle Hutchins and Ted Moore). Avid Records 20171. 2017-06-01
- Travelogue, featuring Three Free Radicals (Scott Miller and Mart Soo). Improtest IMPR11. 2017-08-03
- Raba, featuring Laura Cocks, Dan Lippel, and Ensemble U:. New Focus Recordings FCR198. 2018-03-16
- Contents May Differ, recorded on Music from SEAMUS vol. 24, featuring Pat O’Keefe. EAAM-2014. 2018-10-05

== Selected works ==
1992

- Time is Vicious (if you take it for granted)
  Commissioned by The Double Reed Ensemble of Iowa (a.k.a. Wizards). Two oboes, English horn & bassoon; duration: 5 minutes. Published by Jeanné, Inc. Recorded on the Wizards' CRS Master Recordings CD (CRS 9460). First performance: 1993 by The Double Reed Ensemble of Iowa, University of Iowa, Iowa City, IA.

1998

- Autumn Etude (a.k.a. In Memorium Lloyd Ultan)
  Fixed-media; duration: 8 minutes. First performance: 12 November 1998 at Sonic Circuits VI, St. Cloud, MN.
- Dies Sanctificatus
  Mixed Choir and fixed-media; duration: 7 minutes. First performance: 17 April 1998 by the SCSU Concert Choir, Jeffrey Douma, cdtr., Ritsche Auditorium, St. Cloud, MN.

2000

- Chimera
  Viola and Fixed-media; duration: 7 minutes. First performance: 27 March 2000 by Coca Bochonko, Ruth Gant Recital Hall, St. Cloud, MN.

2001

- Ecce Dominus Veniet
  Women's Choir (SA) and Percussion; duration: 6 minutes. Composed with support from the Minnesota State Arts Board Artist Assistance Fellowship, Fiscal Year 2001 and supported in part by the American Composers Forum through the 2001 McKnight Composer Fellowship Program. First performance: 5 December 2001 by the SCSU Women's Choir and the SCSU Percussion Collective, Ritsche Auditorium, St. Cloud, MN.
- Landscape
  Created with support from St. Cloud State University Scholarly and Creative Activity Reassign Time. Wind Ensemble and Fixed-media; duration: 8 minutes. First performance: 22 April 2001 by the SCSU Wind Ensemble at St. Mary's Cathedral, St. Cloud, MN.

2004

- Shape Shifting: Shades of Transformation
  Commissioned by Zeitgeist. Includes the works: Apnèe, Mirror Inside, St. Victoire, Desire Also Has Its Own Geography, Dressing Up, Jardins Mécaniques, Digging Space, Les Cançóns de la Sang, New Snow. Spoken-word, Interactive-Electronics, Alto Sax/Bass Clarinet, Piano, Percussion (2); includes settings of Philippe Costaglioli's "Apnèe," "St. Victoire," and "Dressing Up;" duration: 65 – 70 minutes. Created in collaboration with Zeitgeist and Philippe Costaglioli. Underwritten by the American Composers Forum with funds provided by the Jerome Foundation. Made possible with support from the Zeitgeist Commissioning Collective. First performance: 4–12 June 2004 by Philippe Costaglioli, Scott Miller, and Zeitgeist at Studio Z, St. Paul, MN.

2005

- Engines of...
  String Orchestra and fixed-media; duration: 7 minutes. Commissioned by Maple Grove Senior High School Orchestra with support of the Maple Grove Music Boosters. First performance: 30 January 2006, by the Maple Grove Senior High School Orchestra, Matt Caron, conductor, Maple Grove, MN.

2006

- Chimera No. 2
  Violin and fixed-media electronics (CD); duration: 19 minutes. Commissioned by Mlade Podium Festival for premier by violinist Iva Kramperová. First performance: 12 September 2006 by Iva Kramperová, Mlade Podium Festival, Pardubice, CZ.
- Fun House
  Bass Clarinet and Interactive Electronics, 2 cardioid microphones, and 4 channel diffusion of sound; duration: 12 – 20 minutes. Commissioned by and created in collaboration with Pat O'Keefe. First performance: February 2006, by Pat O'Keefe, Spark Festival of Electronic Music and Art, Ted Mann Hall, University of Minnesota, Minneapolis, MN.
- Some Fabric and a Few Pieces of Bone
  Interactive work for Kyma, two cardioid microphones, and four-channel diffusion of sound; duration: 6.5 minutes. First performance: September 2006, Livewire Electronic Music Concert, University of Minnesota, Minneapolis, MN.
- Three Gestures
  Clarinet, cello, and piano; duration: 10 minutes. Commissioned by Trio Montecino. First performance: 8 October 2006 by Trio Montecino, Gant Recital Hall, St. Cloud, MN.

2008

- And 30 More
  Bass clarinet, piano, two percussionists and fixed-media electronics (CD); duration: 2.5 minutes. Commissioned by Zeitgeist. First performance: 20–22 June 2008 by Zeitgeist, Studio Z, St. Paul, MN.
- The Cosmic Engine
  Soprano, clarinet/bass clarinet, acoustic/electric guitar, cello, four channel interactive and fixed-media electronics, three channels of video projection; duration: 65 minutes. Created in collaboration with Rosemary Williams (video artist) and Pat O'Keefe (woodwinds). Commissioned by The Southern Theater. First performance: 30–31 May 2008 by Scott Miller, Rosemary Williams, Pat O'Keefe, Norah Long, Jeff Lambert, and Jacqueline Ultan, Electric Eyes New Music and Media Festival, The Southern Theater, Minneapolis, MN.
- Nebe Na Zemi (Heaven on Earth)
  Soprano, interactive-electronics performance environment for Kyma, two cardioid microphones, and four-channel diffusion of sound; duration: 32 minutes. Created for visual artist Vladimír Havlík's multi-channel video installation in the Corpus Christi chapel, Olomouc, CZ. Setting of text from Karl Marx's Das Kapital. First performance: 5 November 2008, Marketa Večeřova, sop.
- Pure Pleasure
  Two Snare Drums and fixed-media electronics (CD); duration: 5 minutes. Commissioned by Patti Cudd. First performance: 7 March 2008 by Patti Cudd, Studio Z, St. Paul, MN.

2009

- Chimeric Night
  Clarinet and interactive-electronics; duration: 5.5 minutes. First performance: 20 October 2009, Hewitt Pantaleoni Concert Series, Oneonta, NY, Calvin Falwell, cl.
- haiku, interrupted
  Clarinet and interactive-electronics; duration: 7.5 minutes. Created in collaboration with Pat O’Keefe. First performance: 17 February 2009 at Spark Festival of Electronic Music and Art, University of Minnesota Arts Quarter, Pat O’Keefe, cl.
- Lovely Little Monster
  Flute, clarinet, percussion and interactive or fixed-media electronics (CD); duration: 7 minutes. First performance: 20 February 2009 at Spark Festival of Electronic Music and Art, University of Minnesota Arts Quarter, Jenny Hanson, fl, Pat O’Keefe, cl., Patti Cudd, perc. Solo cl. version first performed 17 April 2009 at SEAMUS 2009 National Conference, Fort Wayne, IN, Marianne Gythfeldt, cl.

2010

- Tipping Point
  Bass clarinet, marimba, multi-percussion, piano and interactive-electronics; duration: 11.5 minutes. First performance: 1 – 3 April 2010 on Zeitgeist's concert series Wired, Studio Z, St. Paul, MN. Official premier: 10 April 2010, SEAMUS 2010 National Conference, Saint Cloud, MN, by Zeitgeist.
- Whispering Beast
  Interactive-electronics, two cardioid microphones, and four-channel diffusion of sound; duration: 6.5 minutes. First performance: 24 September 2010, Kyma International Sound Symposium 2010, Vienna, Austria.

2011

- Anterior/Interior
  ¼-tone alto flute and interactive-electronics; 8’. First performance: 23 November 2011 by Carla Rees, on rarescale concert (re)introduction, Shoreditch Church, London, UK. Published by Tetractys.
- Forth and Back
  Soprano, bass clarinet, marimba, vibes, multi-percussion and piano, setting of Felip Costaglioli's poem; duration: 20 minutes. First performance: 6–8 October 2011, on Zeitgeist's concert series Fall Music Harvest, Studio Z, St. Paul, MN.
- Orrery for Casa da Música
  Interactive-electronics, two cardioid microphones, and four-channel diffusion of sound; duration: 10 – 15 minutes. First performance: 18 September 2011, Kyma International Sound Symposium 2011, Porto, Portugal.

2012

- Détente
  EMMI robots (AMI, CARI, TAPI), interactive-electronics, two cardioid microphones; duration: 10 – 30 minutes. First performance: 14 July 2012, Sound and Music Computing Conference, Copenhagen, Denmark.
- Proof of Concept
  Trumpet, violin, viola, interactive-electronics; duration: 1 minute. First performance: 1–11 October 2012, SoundProof Fall 2012 concert tour, Bowling Green State University; College-Conservatory of Music, University of Cincinnati; Ohio University; Electronic Music Midwest 2012.

2013

- Consortia
  Interactive-electronics and ensemble; duration: 12 minutes. First performance: 17–19 May 2013, Zeitgeist, St. Paul, MN.
- Contents May Differ
  Bass clarinet and electronics; duration: 9 minutes. Commissioned by Pat O’Keefe. First performance: 15 March 2013, Pat O’Keefe, St. Paul, MN.
- The Frost Performs its Secret Ministry (revised 2016)
  Flute, guitar, and electronics; duration: 6.5 minutes. Commissioned by Jesse Langen and Linda Chatterton. First performance: 6 February 2013, St. Cloud State University.
- No. 6
  Structured improvisation for interactive-electronics and ensemble; duration: 10 minutes. First performance: 2 October 2013, Fifth Column, St. Cloud, MN.
- ORCH a
  Structured improvisation for interactive-electronics and ensemble; duration: 18 minutes. First performance: 2 October 2013, Fifth Column, St. Cloud, MN.
- This Strange Fine-Tuning of Our Universe
  ¼-tone flute and interactive-electronics; duration: 10 – 15 minutes. Written for Anne La Berge. First performance: 13 September 2013, Anne La Berge, Espace Senghor, Brussels.
- Two Steps Forward
  Structured improvisation for interactive-electronics and ensemble; duration: 8 minutes. First performance: 2 October 2013, Fifth Column, St. Cloud, MN.

2014

- Avec Scott (a.k.a. Whispering Beast X Émilie)
  Cello, interactive-electronics, two cardioid microphones, and four-channel diffusion of sound; duration: 10’. Created in collaboration with Émilie Girard-Charest. First performance: 14 December 2014, Estonian Academy of Music and Theater, Tallinn, Estonia.
- A Lovely Gesture
  Interactive-electronics and ensemble; duration: 10’. Created in collaboration with Anne La Berge. First performance: 28 September 2014, Lübeck, Germany.
- Electro-organic Ecosystem for Lübeck
  Organ and interactive-electronics; duration: 10’. First performance: 26 September 2014, Alex Annegorn, St. Jakobi Church, Lübeck, Germany.
- Every Problem is a Nail
  Piano and fixed-media electronics; duration: 10 minutes. Commissioned by Keith Kirchoff. First performance: 7 June 2014, Keith Kirchoff, New York City Electronic Music Festival.

2015

- Accretion
  Flute, clarinet/bass clarinet, violin, cello, piano, multi-percussion, and fixed-media electronics; duration: 9 minutes. Commissioned by Ensemble U:. First performance: 3 November 2015, Ensemble U:, St. Cloud State University, St. Cloud, MN.
- Balancing Act
  Soprano/Tenor saxophone, clarinet/bass clarinet, guitar, real-time electronics, interactive-electronics (Kyma), multiple cardioid microphones, and multi-channel diffusion of sound; duration: 2 hours 45 minutes. Commissioned by Hinge Arts for the Kirkbride. First performance: 7 December 2015, Fifth Column, Zachmann Gallery, Fergus Falls, MN.
- Raba
  Alto flute, violin, cello, tam-tam, and fixed-media electronics; duration: 11 minutes. Commissioned by Spitting Image Collective. First performance: 2 May 2015, Strains, Studio Z, St. Paul, MN.
- Returning to Unknown Worlds
  Saxophone, interactive-electronics, two cardioid microphones, and four-channel diffusion of sound, and video; duration: 10 minutes. Created in collaboration with Michael Monhart and Scott Weissinger. First performance: 11 August 2015, Kyma International Sound Symposium, Bozeman, MT.
- Rubber Band, Man
  Marimba and fixed-media electronics; duration: 7 minutes. Commissioned by Heather Barringer. First performance: 12 June 2015, Heather Barringer, Studio Z, St. Paul, MN.

2016

- Islands
  Flute and interactive-electronics (Kyma), two cardioid microphones, and multi-channel diffusion of sound; duration: 10 – 50 minutes. First performance: 7 September 2016, Carla Rees, PACE-1, De Montfort University, Leicester, UK.
- Meditation
  Guitar and fixed-media electronics; duration: 10 minutes. Commissioned by Dan Lippel. First performance: 15 January 2016, Daniel Lippel, St. Cloud State University, St. Cloud, MN.
- Solstice Orrery
  Fixed-media or interactive electronics and video; duration: 10 minutes. Video by Ted Moore. First performance: 7 October 2016, Sügisfest, Estonian Academy of Music and Theatre, Tallinn.

2017

- Admiration
  Electric guitar, fixed-media electronics and video; duration: 10 minutes. Video by Rosemary Williams. Reconstruction and revision from The Cosmic Engine (2008). First performance: 17 May 2017, Daniel Lippel, SpectrumNYC.
- Hilltop at Montalvo
  Fixed-media electronics and video; duration: 9 minutes. Video by Paul Clipson. First performance: 17 May 2017, Spectrum NYC.
- Raba - VR version for Ensemble U
  Alto flute, clarinet, violin, cello, piano, tam-tam, fixed-media electronics and 360º VR film; duration: 11 minutes. Film by Rein Zobel. First performance: 29 December 2017, Ensemble U:, Estonian Academy of Music and Theatre, Tallinn.

2018

- Katabasis
  Four instruments; duration: 20 minutes. First performance: 2 November 2018, Strains, at Studio Z, St. Paul, MN.
- Sonic Augmented Reality (SonAR) Study I: St. Cloud State University
  Smartphone, SonAR Study I app, headphones; duration: 13 minutes. Created with assistance from the St. Cloud State University Visualization and Simulation Lab. First performance: 5 September 2018, SCSU, St. Cloud, MN.
- This Strange Fine-Tuning of Our Universe II
  Two or more instruments and interactive-electronic (Kyma), two cardioid microphones, and multi-channel diffusion of sound; duration: 14 minutes. Written for Camilla Hoitenga and Taavi Kerikmäe. First performance: 16 February 2018, Studio Z, St. Paul, MN.
