= Dona nobis pacem (round) =

Christian song

- Round
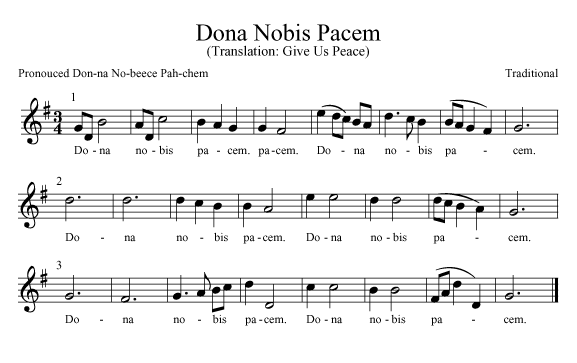
- English: Give us peace
- Text: from Agnus Dei
- Language: Latin
- Melody: passed orally

"Dona nobis pacem" (Ecclesiastical Latin: [ˈdona ˈnobis ˈpatʃem], "Give us peace") is a round for three parts to a short Latin text from the Agnus Dei. The melody has been passed down orally. The round is part of many hymnals and songbooks. Beyond use at church, the round has been popular for secular quests for peace, such as the reunification of Germany.

== History ==
The text of "Dona nobis pacem" is a short prayer for peace from the Agnus Dei of the Latin mass. In the round for three parts, it is sung twice in every line. The melody has been passed down orally. It has traditionally been attributed to Mozart but without evidence. English-language hymnals usually mark it "Traditional". The melody is relatively easy, with the second and third line supplying mostly harmony to the first line, in many long notes versus the flow of the first.

The round is part of many songbooks. Thomas Doss composed a fantasy arrangement for brass orchestra with optional vocal parts in 2003.

Beyond use at church, the round has been popular for secular quests for peace, such as the reunification of Germany.
