= Sheree Clement =

American composer

Sheree J. Clement (born 8 December 1955, Baltimore) is an American composer. She was President of the League of Composers. She graduated from the University of Michigan and Columbia University. Clement was a Guggenheim fellow, and a MacDowell fellow.

== About ==
She was born in Baltimore, Maryland. She moved to New York and completed a DMA in Music Composition at Columbia University. She remained there to revamp their music community.

Clement is known for composing contemporary classical works.

Clement started her compositional career by composing smaller chamber ensembles, focusing on motivic material. One of her more famous works from this time is Chamber Concerto. This work was written for seventeen players, which can be found at Albany Records.

== Works ==
- Belladonna Dreams (1979):
- Chamber Concerto (1982): for Piccolo, Flute, Clarinet, Bass Clarinet, Horn, Trumpet, Trombone, Tuba, 2 Percussion, Piano, Single Strings
- Variations / Obsessions (1985)
- Avian Moments (2015): for Piccolo, C Flute, Alto Flute, Bass Flute
- Voices (2023)
- Sacred and Profane (2024)
- Swimming Upstream
- Table Manners

== Awards ==
- Guggenheim Fellowship
- Goddard Leiberson Award
- Fellowships at the Tanglewood Festival
- two Queens council on the Arts New Works grants
- Residency at the MacDowell Colony
- Residency at Flushing Town Hall
