= Salt Lake Symphony =

The Salt Lake Symphony was founded in 1976 and is a volunteer orchestra that performs in the Libby Gardner Concert Hall in Salt Lake City, Utah. The Salt Lake Symphony is best known for its yearly Vienna Ball Gala on Valentine's Day each year. The orchestra's season generally consists of ten unique performances.

The Salt Lake Symphony is one of the area's volunteer driven orchestras. The Salt Lake Symphony is a non-profit organization performing classical music concerts for the Wasatch Front community. The approximately seventy-five musicians of the SLS volunteer roughly 10,000 hours annually to accomplish this goal.

Robert Baldwin has served as music director and conductor since 2005. He also serves as Director of Orchestral Activities at the University of Utah.
