= John Eaton (composer) =

American composer (1935–2015)

John Charles Eaton (March 30, 1935 – December 2, 2015) was an American composer.

Born in Bryn Mawr, Pennsylvania, Eaton attended Princeton University, where he graduated in 1957. He later lived in Rome (1957–68), returning to Princeton to earn a PhD in 1970. He subsequently held faculty appointments at Indiana University School of Music (1970–92) and the University of Chicago (1989–99).

Eaton was a prominent composer of microtonal music, and worked with Paul Ketoff and Robert Moog during the 1960s in developing several types of synthesizer. Notably, he was involved in the development, use, and ultimately unsuccessful commercialization of the SynKet. He devised a compositional genre called pocket opera, operas scored for a small cast of vocalists and a chamber group, and composed such pocket opera works as Peer Gynt, Let's Get This Show on the Road, and The Curious Case of Benjamin Button.

His operas include The Cry of Clytaemnestra (1980), a re-telling of some of the events surrounding the Trojan War from the perspective of Agamemnon's wife Clytaemnestra, which has been hailed as the first feminist opera. It was premièred at the Indiana University Bloomington Opera Theater, on March 1, 1980, and received a number of subsequent productions, most notably in New York and California. Eaton's opera, The Tempest, with a libretto by Andrew Porter after William Shakespeare, was premièred at the Santa Fe Opera on July 27, 1985, and subsequently performed in the autumn of 1986 at the Indiana University School of Music.

During his tenure at the University of Chicago, Eaton concentrated on works for smaller ensembles, including chamber operas that involved dramatic participation of the instrumentalists alongside the singers. He founded and directed The Pocket Opera Players, a professional troupe dedicated to the performance of his works in this genre, and occasionally those of fellow composers interested in the form. He continued to lead the Pocket Opera Players in New York City, after his retirement from Chicago in 2001. He was a recipient of the Prix de Rome, a Guggenheim Fellowship, and a MacArthur Fellowship.

Eaton died on December 2, 2015, following a brain hemorrhage. His wife Nelda Nelson-Eaton and two children, Estela and Julian, survive him.

== Operas ==
- Ma Barker (written 1957–58)
- Herakles (written 1964; October 10, 1968, Turin)
- Myshkin (April 23, 1973 Bloomington, Ind.)
- The Lion and Androcles (written 1973; May 1, 1974 Indianapolis)
- Danton and Robespierre (written 1978; April 21, 1978 Bloomington)
- The Cry of Clytemnestra (written 1979–80; March 1, 1980 Bloomington)
- The Tempest (written 1983–85; July 27, 1985 Santa Fe)
- The Reverend Jim Jones (written 1989)
- Let's Get This Show on the Road (written 1993)
- Golk (written 1995)
- Antigone (written 1999)
- . . . inasmuch (written 2002)
- King Lear (written 2003–2004)
