= List of First Edition Records releases =

This is a discography of LP releases by the Louisville Orchestra on First Edition Records, and CD releases on First Edition Records and the First Edition Music labels.

Original LPs
No.	Year	Composer(s)	Title(s)	Format	Notes
LOU-545-1	1955	Paul Creston, Heitor Villa-Lobos, Halsey Stevens	Invocation And Dance, Op. 58 / Alvorada Na Floresta Tropical / Triskelion	LP	all LPs mono unless otherwise noted
LOU-545-2	1955	Henry Cowell, Alexander Tcherepnin, Bernard Wagenaar	Symphony No. 11 / Suite / A Concert Overture	LP	
LOU-545-3	1955	Peter Mennin, Wallingford Riegger, Ernst Toch	Symphony No. 6 / Variations For Piano And Orchestra / Notturno	LP	
LOU-545-4	1955	Alan Hovhaness, Mario Castelnuovo-Tedesco, Carlos Surinach	Concerto No. 7 For Orchestra / Overture To "Much Ado About Nothing" / Sinfonietta Flamenca	LP	
LOU-545-5	1955	Jacques Ibert, Gardner Read, Otto Luening & Vladimir Ussachevsky	Louisville Concerto / Toccata Giocosa / Rhapsodic Variations For Tape Recorder And Orchestra	LP	
LOU-545-6	1955	Peggy Glanville-Hicks	The Transposed Heads	LP	
LOU-545-7	1955	Vincent Persichetti, Robert Sanders, Boris Blacher	Symphony For Strings / Little Symphony No. 2 In B Flat / Studie In Pianissimo	LP	
LOU-545-8	1955	Luigi Dallapiccola, José Pablo Moncayo, Ulysses Kay, Darius Milhaud	Variazioni Per Orchestra / Cumbres / Serenade For Orchestra / Ouverture Méditerranéenne	LP	
LOU-545-9	1955	Gottfried von Einem, Karol Rathaus, George Perle	Meditations / Prelude For Orchestra / Rhapsody For Orchestra	LP	
LOU-545-10	1955	Alberto Ginastera, Henri Sauguet, Robert Ward, William Bergsma	Pampeana No. 3 / A Carol On Twelfth Night / Les Trois Lys / Euphony For Orchestra	LP	
LOU-545-11	1955	Gian Francesco Malipiero, Vittorio Rieti, Ernst Bacon	Fantasie Di Ogni Giorno / Introduzione E Gioco Delle Ore / The Enchanted Island	LP	
LOU-56-1	1956	Hilding Rosenberg, Camargo Guarnieri	Louisville Concerto / "And The Fallen Petals" / Suite IV Centenario	LP	
LOU-56-2	1956	Alexandre Tansman, Felix Borowski, Ingolf Dahl	Capriccio / The Mirror / The Tower Of Saint Barbara	LP	
LOU-56-3	1956	Ernst Krenek, Roberto Caamaño	Eleven Transparencies / Magnificat	LP	
LOU-56-4	1956	George Antheil	The Wish	LP	
LOU-56-5	1956	Juan Orrego-Salas, Harold Shapero, Robert Muczynski	Serenata Concertante / Credo For Orchestra / Concerto No. 1 For Piano And Orchestra	LP	
LOU-56-6	1956	Henk Badings, Ben Weber, Leo Sowerby	The Louisville Symphony / Prelude And Passacaglia / All On A Summer's Day	LP	
LOU-57-1	1957	Paul Nordoff, Paul Müller-Zürich	Winter Symphony / Concerto For Cello And Orchestra	LP	
LOU-57-2	1957	André Jolivet, John Vincent	Suite Transocéane / Symphony In D	LP	
LOU-57-3	1957	Rolf Liebermann	School for Wives	LP	
LOU-57-4	1957	Roger Sessions	Idyll Of Theocritus	LP	
LOU-57-5	1957	Ned Rorem, Bernard Reichel	Design For Orchestra / Suite Symphonique	LP	
LOU-57-6	1957	Edmund Rubbra, Irving Fine, Harold Morris	Improvisation For Violin & Orchestra / Serious Song: A Lament For String Orchestra / Passacaglia, Adagio And Finale	LP	
LOU-58-1	1958	Alexei Haieff, Nicolas Nabokov	Ballet In E / Symboli Chrestiani For Baritone And Orchestra	LP	
LOU-58-2	1958	Lou Harrison, Peter Jona Korn	Four Strict Songs For Eight Baritones And Orchestra / Variations On A Tune From "The Beggar's Opera"	LP	
LOU-58-3	1958	Elliott Carter, Everett Helm	Variations For Orchestra / Second Piano Concerto	LP	
LOU-58-4	1958	Arthur Berger, Carlos Surinach, Meyer Kupferman	Polyphony For Orchestra / Overture, Feria Magica / Fourth Symphony	LP	
LOU-58-5	1958	Roger Goeb, Gail Kubik	Concertino For Orchestra / Symphony No. 2 In F	LP	
LOU-58-6	1958	Roger Sessions, David Van Vactor, Niels Viggo Bentzon	Serenata / Fantasia, Chaconne And Allegro / Pezzi Sinfonici	LP	
LOU-59-1	1959	Aaron Copland, Alfonso Lefelier	Orchestral Variations / "Aculeo" Suite For Orchestra	LP	
LOU-592	1959	Arthur Bliss, Colin McPhee	Discourse For Orchestra / Symphony No. 2, Pastoral	LP	
LOU-593	1959	Halsey Stevens, Herbert Elwell	Sinfonia Breve / Concert Suite For Violin And Orchestra	LP	
LOU-594	1959	Nicolas Nabokov	The Holy Devil	LP	
LOU-595	1959	Henry Cowell, Benjamin Lees	Ongaku For Orchestra / Symphony No. 2	LP	
LOU-601	1960	Paul Ben-Haim, Wallingford Riegger	To The Chief Musician: Metamorphoses For Orchestra / Variations For Violin And Orchestra, Op. 71	LP	
LOU-602	1960	Klaus Egge, Roy Harris	Symphony No. 3 / Kentucky Spring	LP	
LOU-603	1960	Lee Hoiby	Beatrice	LP	2-LP set
LOU-604	1960	William Schuman, Gian Francesco Malipiero	Judith, Chorographic Poem for Orchestra / Concerto No. 3 for Piano and Orchestra	LP	
LOU-605	1960	Paul Hindemith, David Diamond, Claude Almand	Sinfonietta in E / Timon Of Athens: A Symphonic Portrait After Shakespeare / John Gilbert: A Steamboat Overture	LP	
LOU-606	1960	Bernard Rogers, Joaquín Rodrigo, Vincent Persichetti	Dance Scenes / Cuatro Madrigales Amatorios / Serenade No. 5	LP	
LOU-611	1961	Elliott Carter, Alexei Haieff	Symphony No. 1 / Divertimento	LP	
LOU-612	1961	Ernst Toch, Roberto García Morillo	Peter Pan: A Fairy Tale for Orchestra, Op. 76 / Variaciones Olimpicas, Op. 24	LP	
LOU-613	1961	Peter Mennin, Joaquín Rodrigo	Symphony No.5 / Concerto Galante for Violincello and Orchestra	LP	
LOU-614	1961	Alan Hovhaness, Chou Wen-chung	Magnificat For Four Solo Voices, Chorus And Orchestra, Op. 157 / All In The Spring Wind	LP	
LOU-615	1961	Alexander Tcherepnin, Arthur Honegger	Piano Concerto No. 2 / Suite Archaique	LP	
LOU-616	1961	Robert Kurka, Robert Whitney	Symphony No. 2, Op. 24 / Concertino	LP	
LOU-621	1962	Charles Ives, Lou Harrison	Decoration Day / Suite for Symphonic Strings	LP	
LOU-622	1962	Henry Cowell, Rodolfo Halffter	Thesis / Ballet Suite, "La Madrugada Del Panadero"	LP	
LOU-623	1962	Harald Sæverud, George Rochberg	Peer Gynt Suite No. 1 Op. 28 / Night Music	LP	
LOU-624	1962	Juan Orrego-Salas, Andrzej Panufnik	Symphony No. 2 / Sinfonia Elegiaca	LP	
LOU-625	1962	Ross Lee Finney, Iain Hamilton	Symphony No. 2 / Scottish Dances, Op. 32	LP	
LOU-626	1962	Benjamin Britten, Paul Ben-Haim	Violin Concerto No. 1, Op. 15 / "Pastorale Variee" For Clarinet, Harp And Strings, Op. 31	LP	
LOU-631	1963	Zoltán Kodály, Nelson Keyes	Symphony / Suite, "Music For Monday Evenings"	LP	
LOU-632	1963	Hale Smith, Gardner Read, Robert Kurka	Contours For Orchestra / Night Flight / Serenade For Small Orchestra	LP	
LOU-633	1963	Walter Piston, Hall Overton	Concerto For Viola And Orchestra / Symphony No. 2 In One Movement	LP	in stereo LS-633
LOU-634	1963	George Rochberg, Ray Luke	Symphony No. 1 / Symphony No. 2	LP	
LOU-635	1963	Carlisle Floyd, Robert Sanders	The Mystery / Little Symphony No. 1 In G	LP	
LOU-636	1963	Ernst Bloch, Frank Martin, Toshiro Mayuzumi	Concerto For Violin And Orchestra / Proclamation For Trumpet And Orchestra / Pieces For Prepared Piano And Strings	LP	in stereo LS-636
LOU-641	1964	Luigi Dallapiccola, José Serebrier	Soliloquy Of A Bhiksuni – Due Pezzi / Partita	LP	
LOU-642	1964	Quincy Porter, Vittorio Giannini	Symphony No. 2 / Divertimento No. 2	LP	
LOU-643	1964	Werner Egk, Hans Werner Henze, Irving Fine	Suite From Ballet "Abraxas" / Wedding Music From "Undine" / Diversions For Orchestra	LP	
LOU-644	1964	Ned Rorem, William Jay Sydeman	Eleven Studies For Eleven Players / Orchestral Abstractions	LP	
LOU-645	1964	Alexander Tcherepnin, Richard Mohaupt	Symphony No. 2 / Town Piper Music	LP	
LOU-646	1964	Wallingford Riegger, Roberto Gerhard	Symphony No. 4 / Allegrias	LP	
LOU-651	1965	Alvin Etler, Charles Ives & William Schuman, Ulysses Kay	Concerto For Wind Quintet And Orchestra / Variations On "America" / Umbrian Scene	LP	
LOU-652	1965	Ross Lee Finney, Daniel Pinkham	Symphony No. 1 (Communique 1943) / Symphony No. 2	LP	
LOU-653	1965	Walter Piston, William Kraft	Symphony No. 5 / Concerto Grosso	LP	in stereo LS-653
LOU-654	1965	Nikolai Lopatnikoff, Andrzej Panufnik	Variazioni Concertanti / Nocturne	LP	
LOU-655	1965	Roy Harris, Paul Creston	Symphony No. 5 / Corinthians 13	LP	in stereo LS-655
LOU-656	1965	Robert Kurka, Carlos Surinach	Suite From "The Good Soldier Schweik" / Symphonic Variations	LP	in stereo LS-656
LOU-661	1966	Ernst Toch, Harry Somers, François Morel	Jephta. Rhapsodic Poem (Symphony No. 5) / Passacaglia And Fugue For Orchestra / Antiphonie	LP	in stereo LS-661
LOU-662	1966	Alan Hovhaness, Lennox Berkeley	Symphony No. 15 "The Silver Pilgrimage" / Four Ronsard Sonets for Tenor and Orchestra	LP	in stereo LS-662
LOU-663	1966	Bohuslav Martinů, Virgil Thomson	Symphony No. 5 / Concerto For Flute	LP	
LOU-664	1966	Gian Francesco Malipiero, Irwin Bazelon	Notturno Di Canti E Balli / Short Symphony (Testament To A Big City)	LP	in stereo LS-664
LOU-665	1966	Benjamin Lees, Ronald Herder, Luigi Nono	Concerto For Orchestra / Movements For Orchestra / Uno Espressione	LP	in stereo LS-665
LOU-666	1966	Roy Harris, Gunther Schuller, Toshiro Mayuzumi	Epilogue to Profiles in Courage: JFK / Dramatic Overture / Samsara, Symphonic Poem	LP	
LOU-671	1967	Boris Blacher, Andrzej Panufnik	Orchestral Fantasy / Rhapsody For Orchestra	LP	in stereo LS-671
LOU-674	1967	Alvin Etler, Harold Shapero	Triptych / Partita In C For Piano And Small Orchestra	LP	in stereo LS-674
LOU-675	1967	Peter Racine Fricker	Symphony No. 1, Op. 9	LP	in stereo LS-675
LOU-676	1967	Goffredo Petrassi, Ben Weber, Irwin Leroy Fischer	Concerto No. 5 For Orchestra / Dolmen, An Elegy / Overture On An Exuberant Tone Row	LP	
LOU-681	1968	Henry Cowell, Carlos Surinach	Sinfonietta / Melorhythmic Dramas	LP	
LOU-682	1968	Charles Koechlin, Robert Starer, Henry Cowell	Cinq Chorals Dans Les Modes Du Moyen-Age / Mutabili / Hymn And Fuguing Tune No. 2 / Ballad / Hymn And Fuguing Tune No. 3	LP	in stereo LS-682
LOU-683	1968	Dmitri Shostakovich, Leon Kirchner	Hamlet, Op. 32 / Toccata	LP	in stereo LS-683
LOU-684	1968	Goffredo Petrassi, Paul Hindemith	Kammermusik / Noche Oscura	LP	in stereo LS-684
LOU-685	1968	Boris Blacher, Francis Poulenc, Darius Milhaud	Orchestral Ornament, Op. 44 / Deux Marches et un Intermède / Cortège Funèbre	LP	in stereo LS-685
LOU-686	1986	Leonardo Balada, Gunther Schuller, Luigi Dallapiccola	Guernica / Five Bagatelles for Orchestra / Musica Notturna	LP	in stereo LS-686
LOU-691	1969	Peter Schickele, Stanley Walden, Robert Dennis	Three Views From "The Open Window"	LP	in stereo LS-691
LOU-692	1969	William Schuman, Robert Bernat	Symphony No. 4 / In Memoriam: John F Kennedy	LP	in stereo LS-692
LOU-693	1969	Peter Mennin, Arthur Honegger	Concerto for Cello and Orchestra / Prelude To "Aglavaine Et Selysette	LP	in stereo LS-693
LOU-694	1969	Paul Hindemith, Easley Blackwood, Jr.	Concert Music For Solo Viola And Large Chamber Orchestra, Op. 48 / Concerto For Violin And Orchestra, Op. 21	LP	in stereo LS-694
LOU-695	1969	Heitor Villa-Lobos, John Addison	Danses Africaines / Concerto For Trumpet And Strings	LP	in stereo LS-695
LOU-696	1969	Silvestre Revueltas, Alberto Ginastera	Redes / "Ollantay", a Symphonic Triptych	LP	in stereo LS-696
LOU-701	1970	Antonio Tauriello, Marcel Grandjany, Mátyás Seiber	"Ilinx" for Clarinet Solo and Orchestra / Aria in Classic Style for Harp and Strings / Concertino for Clarinet and Strings	LP	in stereo LS-701
LOU-702	1970	Héctor Tosar, Ernst Toch, Jacques Ibert, Yoav Talmi, Camargo Guarnieri	Toccata / Miniature Overture / Bacchanale / Overture On Mexican Themes / Three Dances For Orchestra	LP	in stereo LS-702
LOU-703	1970	Julius Rietz, Max Bruch	Concert Ouverture Op. 7 / Symphony No. 2 In F Minor, Op. 36	LP	in stereo LS-703
LOU-704	1970	Richard Strauss, Phillip Rhodes	Six Songs, Op. 68 (After Clemens Brentano) / "The Lament Of Michal" For Soprano and Orchestra	LP	"100th Golden Edition", in stereo LS-704
LOU-705	1970	Joseph Joachim	Concerto For Violins And Orchestra In D Minor ("In The Hungarian Style")	LP	in stereo LS-705
LOU-706	1970	Vincent Persichetti, Wallingford Riegger	Symphony No. 8 / Study In Sonority, Op. 7	LP	in stereo LS-706
LOU-711	1971	George Crumb, Merrill Leroy Ellis	Echoes Of Time And The River (Echoes II) / "Kaleidoscope" For Orchestra, Synthesizer, And Soprano	LP	in stereo LS-711
LOU-712	1971	Ezra Laderman, Nelson Keyes	Magic Prison / Abysses, Bridges, Chasms For Ten Rock-Jazz Soloists And Orchestra	LP	in stereo LS-712
LOU-713	1970	Carlos Chávez, Enrique Granados	Suite From "Horsepower" / "Dante" Symphonic Poem, Op. 21	LP	in stereo LS-713
LOU-714	1970	Gustavo Becerra-Schmidt, Jesús Pinzón Urrea, Gerardo Gandini, Héctor Quintanar	Symphony No. 1 / Study for Orchestra / Fantasie-Impromptu for Piano and Orchestra / Sideral II	LP	in stereo LS-714
LOU-715	1971	György Ránki, Wallingford Riegger	Elegiac Variations / Lamentation For Orchestra / Dichotomy	LP	in stereo LS-715
LOU-716	1971	Morton Gould, Carlisle Floyd	Soundings / Columbia / In Celebration: An Overture For Orchestra	LP	in stereo LS-716
LOU-721	1972	John J. Becker, William Schuman, Felix Labunski	Symphonia Brevis (Symphony No. 3) / Prayer In Time Of War / Canto Di Aspirazione	LP	in stereo LS-721
LOU-722	1972	Krzysztof Penderecki, Gene Gutchë, Karel Husa	De Natura Sonoris No. 2 / Genghis Khan, Op. 37 / Music For Prague 1968	LP	in stereo LS-722
LOU-723	1972	Phillip Rhodes	From "Paradise Lost" An Opera-Oratorio In Three Acts	LP	disc 1 of 2, in stereo LS-723
LOU-724	1972	Phillip Rhodes	From "Paradise Lost" An Opera-Oratorio In Three Acts	LP	disc 2 of 2, in stereo LS-724
LOU-725	1972	Karel Husa, Matthias Bamert	Two Sonnets From Michelangelo / "Septuria Lunaris"	LP	in stereo LS-725
LOU-726	1972	Leonardo Balada	María Sabina (Tragifonía / A Symphonic Tragedy For Narrators, Chorus And Orchestra)	LP	in stereo LS-726
LOU-731	1973	Frank Martin, Malcolm Arnold	Concerto For Cello And Orchestra / Concerto For Two Violins And String Orchestra, Op. 77	LP	in stereo LS-731
LOU-732	1973	Rod McKuen	The City / I Hear America Singing	LP	in stereo LS-732
LOU-733	1973	Ned Rorem, Thomas Briccetti, Paul Turok	Piano Concerto In Six Movements / Overture: The Fountain Of Youth / Lyric Variations	LP	in stereo LS-733
LOU-734	1973	Max Reger, Georges Bizet, Moritz Moszkowski, Eduard Nápravník	A Comedy Overture, Op. 120 / Chromatic Variations / Suite No. 3 For Orchestra, Op. 79 / Festive March	LP	in stereo LS-734
LOU-735	1973	Lawrence Widdoes, Paul Sculthorpe, Alan Hovhaness	Morning Music / Sun Music III / Avak, The Healer	LP	in stereo LS-735
LOU-736	1973	Jacques Ibert, Charles Koechlin	Ballad Of Reading Gaol / Partita For Chamber Orchestra	LP	in stereo LS-736
LOU-741	1974	Gordon Crosse, Matthias Bamert, Philip Rhodes	Mantrajana / Some Marches On A Ground / Museum Pieces	LP	in stereo LS-741
LOU-742	1974	Norman Dello Joio, Dan Welcher	Homage To Haydn / Concerto For Flute And Orchestra	LP	in stereo LS-742
LOU-743	1974	Ernest Guiraud, Moritz Moszkowski	"The Fantastic Hunt" Symphonic Poem / Violin Concerto In C Major Op. 30	LP	in stereo LS-743
LOU-744	1974	Darius Milhaud	Chansons De Ronsard For Soprano And Orchestra / Symphony No. 6 For Large Orchestra	LP	in stereo LS-744
LOU-745	1974	Claus Adam, Samuel Barber	Concerto For Cello And Orchestra / Die Natali	LP	in stereo LS-745
LOU-746	1974	Walter Piston	Symphony No. 7 / Symphony No. 8	LP	in stereo LS-746
LOU-751	1975	David Baker, Morton Gould	"Le Chat Qui Peche", For Soprano, Jazz Quartet, And Orchestra / Symphonette No. 2	LP	in stereo LS-751
LOU-752	1975	Benjamin Lees, Joaquín Turina	Symphony No. 3 / Danzas Gitanas, Op. 55	LP	in stereo LS-752
LOU-753	1975	Frederick Shepherd Converse, George Whitefield Chadwick	Endymion's Narrative: Romance for Orchestra / Flivver Ten Million: A Joyous Epic / Euterpe: Concert Overture for Orchestra	LP	in stereo LS-753
LOU-754	1975	Arthur Foote, Arthur Bird, Leo Ornstein	Francesca Da Rimini / Carnival Scene / Nocturne and Dance of the Fates	LP	in stereo LS-754
LOU-755	1975	Walter Piston, Dudley Buck	The Incredible Flutist / Festival Overture On The American National Air	LP	in stereo LS-755
LOU-756	1975	Ernst Krenek, Peter Maxwell Davies	Music For Winds, Brass And Percussion	LP	in stereo LS-756
LOU-757	1975	Stephen Douglas Burton	Songs of the Tulpehocken	LP	in stereo LS-757
LOU-758	1975	Edward Harper, Alun Hoddinott, Anthony Strilko	Bartók Games / Investiture Dances / The Meditation Of Hermes Trismegistus	LP	in stereo LS-758
LOU-760	1976	Eric Stokes	The Continental Harp And Band Report (An American Miscellany)	LP	in stereo LS-760
LOU-761	1976	Joaquín Nin-Culmell, Blas Galindo	Diferencias / Symphony No. 2	LP	in stereo LS-761
LOU-762	1977	Heitor Villa-Lobos, Priscilla McLean	Bachianas Brasileieas No. 4 / Variations And Mosaics On A Theme Of Stravinsky	LP	in stereo LS-762
LOU-763	1976	Samuel Barber, Dan Welcher, Hunter Johnson	Prayers Of Kierkegaard, Op. 30 / Dervishes: Ritual Dance-Scene For Full Orchestra / Past The Evening Sun	LP	in stereo LS-763
LOU-764	1976	Jacob Druckman, Dominick Argento	Lamia / Royal Invitation	LP	in stereo LS-764
LOU-765	1979	Roque Cordero, Leonardo Balada, Henry Brant	Symphony No. 2 / Hommage A Sarasate / On The Nature Of Things	LP	numbering system changed; in stereo LS-765
LOU-766	1979	Roy Harris, John Weinzweig, Walter Piston	When Johnny Comes Marching Home Overture / Symphonic Ode / Symphony No. 1	LP	in stereo LS-766
LOU-767	1979	Gian Carlo Menotti, Ivana Marburger Themmen	The Telephone / Shelter This Candle	LP	in stereo LS-767
LOU-768	1980	Peter Schickele, Francis Thorne, Joyce Mekeel	Pentangle For Horn / Elegy / Vigil	LP	in stereo LS-768
LOU-769	1980	Jacques Hétu, Derek Healey	Piano Concerto / Arctic Images	LP	in stereo LS-769
LOU-770	1980	Peter Maxwell Davies, George Antheil	St. Thomas Wake / Symphony No. 5	LP	in stereo LS-770
LOU-771	1980	John Corigliano, Bohuslav Martinů	Tournaments, Elegy / Oboe Concerto	LP	in stereo LS-771
LOU-772	1980	Donald Erb	Spatial Fanfare for Brass and Percussion, Concerto for Trombone, Christmasmusic, Autumnmusic	LP	in stereo LS-772
LOU-773	1981	Gunnar de Frumerie, Daniel Börtz, Lars-Erik Larsson	Symphonic Variations / In Memoria Di / Divertimento	LP	in stereo LS-773
LOU-774	1981	George Crumb, Sydney Hodkinson	Varazioni / Fresco	LP	in stereo LS-774
LOU-775	1981	Karel Husa	The Trojan Women	LP	in stereo LS-775
LOU-776	1981	Roger Sessions	Symphony No. 7 / Divertimento For Orchestra	LP	in stereo LS-776
LOU-777	1983	Duke Ellington, Toshiro Mayuzumi	Suite From The River / Essay For String Orchestra	LP	in stereo LS-777
LOU-778	1983	Thomas Ludwig, Stanisław Skrowaczewski	Symphony No. 1 / Music at Night	LP	in stereo LS-778
LOU-779	1983	Rolv Yttrehus, Alberto Ginastera	Gradus Ad Parnassum / Iubilum	LP	in stereo LS-779
LOU-780	1984	Frederick A. Fox, Stuart Sankey	Night Ceremonies / Variations For Orchestra	LP	in stereo LS-780
LOU-781	1985	Paul Chihara, David Amram	Concerto For Saxophone And Orchestra / Ode To Lord Buckley	LP	in stereo LS-781
LOU-782	1982	Louis Moreau Gottschalk	Cakewalk Ballet	LP	in stereo LS-782
LOU-783	1986	Gundaris Pone, Marc-Antonio Consoli	La Serenissima / Afterimages	LP	disc 1 of 2, in stereo LS-783
LOU-784	1986	Boris Pillin, Stephen Suber	Symphony, Op. 3 / Symphony: Of Wind and Light	LP	disc 2 of 2, in stereo LS-784
LOU-785	1986	Paul Ramsier	Divertimento Concertante on a Theme of Couperin / The Road to Hamelin	LP	in stereo LS-785
LOU-786	1987	Roy Harris	Symphony 1933 (Symphony No. 1) / Concerto For Violin And Orchestra	LP	in stereo LS-786
LOU-787	1987	Ned Rorem	Air Music / Eagles	LP	in stereo LS-787
LOU-788	1987	Morton Gould, Paul Chihara	Concerto For Viola And Orchestra / Flourishes And Galop / Forest Music For Orchestra	LP	in stereo LS-788
LOU-789	1987	Claude Baker, John B. Foley, Walter Piston	The Glass Bead Game / A Movement For Orchestra / Ricercare	LP	in stereo LS-789
LOU-790	1987	Tomáš Svoboda, Frederic Goossen	Symphony No. 4 Op. 69 "Apocalyptic" / Ex Libris, Op. 113 / Orpheus Singing	LP	in stereo LS-790
LOU-791	1989	Morton Gould	Housewarming / Symphony Of Spirituals	LP	in stereo LS-791
LOU-792	1987	Charles Wuorinen, Boris Blacher	Suite from "The Magic Art" / Orchestral Variations on a Theme by Paganini, Op. 26	LP	in stereo LS-792
LOU-793	1989	Dan Welcher, Robert Xavier Rodríguez	The Visions Of Merlin / Favola Boccaccesca	LP	in stereo LS-793
LOU-794	1989	Ezra Laderman, Raymond Luedeke	Sanctuary / Shadow Music	LP	in stereo LS-794
LOU-795	1989	Brian Fennelly, Sydney Hodkinson	Fantasy Variations / Sinfonia Concertante	LP	in stereo LS-795
LOU-796	1990	Wilfred Josephs, Donaldson V. Lawhead, Kevin Hanlon	Variations on a Theme of Beethoven / Aleost / Cumulus Nimbus	LP	in stereo LS-796
LOU-797	1990	Ellen Taaffe Zwilich, Karl Korte	Cello Symphony No. 2 / Symphony No. 3	LP	in stereo LS-797
LOU-798	1987	Paul Hindemith, Gunther Schuller	Piano Concerto / Farbenspiel (Concerto for Orchestra No. 3)	LP	in stereo LS-798
LOU-799	1990	Karel Husa	Apotheosis Of This Earth / Monodrama, Ballet For Orchestra	LP	in stereo LS-799
LOU-800	1991	Ezra Laderman	Concerto For Violin And Orchestra / Citadel	LP	in stereo LS-800
LOU-801	1987	Witold Lutoslawski, Sofia Gubaidulina	Fanfare for Louisville / Pro et Contra	LP	in stereo LS-801
LOU-802	1992	Paul Creston, Otto Luening, William Bolcom	Invocation And Dance / Kentucky Concerto / Seattle Slew	LP	in stereo LS-802
FER-1	1974	Richard Strauss	Strauss Conducts Strauss	LP	
FER-2	1974	Richard Wagner, Felix Mendelssohn	Wilhelm Furtwängler Conducts	LP	
FER-3	1974	Paul Hindemith	Paul Hindemith Conducts Paul Hindemith	LP	
FER-4	1974	Ludwig van Beethoven	Symphony No. 9 in D Major	LP	

CD Re-issues
No.	Year	Composer(s)	Title(s)	Format	Notes
LCD001	1990	Sidney Hodkinson, Wilfred Josephs, Karl Korte	Sinfonia Concertante / Variations on a Theme of Beethoven / Symphony No. 3	CD	from 795, 796, 797
LCD002	1990	Donaldson V. Lawhead, Paul Hindemith, Ellen Taafe Zwilich	Aleost / Concerto For Piano And Orchestra / Symphony No. 2, "Cello Symphony"	CD	from 796, 797
LCD003	1990	Kevin Hanlon, Brian Fennelly, Gunther Schuller	Cumulus Nimbus / Fantasy Variations / Farbenspiel: Concerto No. 3 for Orchestra	CD	from 795, 796, 798
LCD004	1990	Ezra Laderman	Concerto For Violin And Orchestra / Sanctuary / Citadel	CD	from 800, 794
LCD005	1991	Witold Lutoslawski, Karel Husa, Paul Creston	Fanfare For Louisville / Apotheosis Of This Earth / Monodrama / Invocation And Dance	CD	from 801, 799, 802
LCD006	1991	Joan Tower, Otto Luening, Sophia Gubaidulina	Island Rhythms / Kentucky Concerto / Pro Et Contra	CD	from 802, 801
LCD007	1992	William Bolcom	Symphony No. 1 / Symphony No. 3 / Seattle Slew Orchestral Suite	CD	same as FECD-0033, from 802
LCD008	1994	John Corigliano	Gazebo Dances / Voyage for Strings / Promenade Overture / Campane di Ravello / Concerto for Piano and Orchestra	CD	
LCD009	1995	Adolphus Hailstork, Gunther Schuller, Ellen Taaffe Zwilich & David Dzubay	An American Port of Call / Four Soundscapes / Concerto for Violin, Cello & Orchestra / Snake Alley	CD	
FECD-0001	2001	Aaron Copland, Luigi Dallapiccola, Elliott Carter, William Schuman & Charles Ives	Variations for Orchestra	CD	from 59-1, 545-8, 58-3, 651
FECD-0002	2001	John Corigliano	Tournaments Overture / Piano Concerto	CD	from 771
FECD-0003	2001	Henry Cowell	Ongaku / Symphony No. 11 / Thesis	CD	from 595, 545-2, 622
FECD-0004	2001	Ellen Taafe Zwilich	Chamber Symphony / Double Concerto / Symphony No. 2	CD	from 797
FECD-0005	2001	Roy Harris	Kentucky Spring / Violin Concerto / Symphony No. 5	CD	from 602, 786, 655
FECD-0006	2001	Alan Hovhaness	Concerto No. 7 / Symphony No. 15 / Magnificat	CD	from 545-4, 662, 614
FECD-0007	2001	Wallingford Riegger	Variations / Symphony No. 4	CD	from 601
FECD-0008	2002	George Crumb	Variazioni / Echoes of Time and the River (Echoes II)	CD	from 711
FECD-0009	2002	Karel Husa	Music for Prague 1968 / Apotheosis of this Earth	CD	from 722, 799
FECD-0010	2002	Walter Piston	Serenata / Symphony No. 5 / Symphony No. 7 / Symphony No. 8	CD	from 58-6, 653, 766, 746
FECD-0011	2002	William Schuman	Symphony No. 4 / Prayer In Time Of War / Judith	CD	from 692, 721, 604
FECD-0012	2003	Roger Sessions	Divertimento For Orchestra / Idyll Of Theocritus	CD	from 776, 57-4
FECD-0013	2003	Peter Mennin	Symphony No. 5 / Concerto For Cello And Orchestra / Symphony No. 6	CD	from 693, 545-3
FECD-0014	2003	Lou Harrison	Suite for Symphonic Strings / Strict Songs for Eight Baritones	CD	from 58-2
FECD-0015	2003	Alberto Ginastera	Ollantay / Pampeana No. 3 / Jubilum	CD	from 696, 545-10
FECD-0016	2003	Heitor Villa-Lobos	Erosão / Danses Africaines / Bachianas Brasileiras No. 4	CD	from 695, 762
FECD-0017	2003	Andrzej Panufnik	Sinfonia Elegiaca / Nocturne / Rhapsody	CD	from 624, 654, 671
FECD-0018	2003	Bohuslav Martinů	Symphony No. 5 / Intermezzo / Concerto for Oboe and Orchestra / Estampes	CD	from 663, 771
FECD-0019	2003	Norman Dello Joio	Homage to Haydn / The Triumph of St. Joan	CD	from 742
FECD-0020	2003	Frank Martin	Violin Concerto / Cello Concerto	CD	from 731
FECD-0021	2003	Ned Rorem	Eleven Studies / Piano Concerto	CD	from 644, 733
FECD-0022	2003	Paul Hindemith	Kammermusik No. 2 / Concert Music for Viola / Piano Concerto	CD	from 684, 694
FECD-0023	2004	Karel Husa	Two Sonnets From Michelangelo / The Trojan Women	CD	from 725, 775
FECD-0024	2004	Alexander Tcherepnin	Piano Concerto No. 2, Op. 22 / Symphony No. 2, Op. 77 / Suite for Orchestra, Op. 87	CD	from 645
FECD-0025	2004	Joan Tower	Silver Ladders / Island Prelude / Music For Cello And Orchestra / Sequoia	CD	
FECD-0026	2004	Christopher Rouse	Symphony No. 1 / Phantasmata	CD	
FECD-0027	2004	Robert Xavier Rodriguez	Oktoechos / Favola Boccaccesca / The Song of Songs	CD	
FECD-0028	2004	John Harbison	Ulysses' Bow / Samuel Chapter	CD	
FECD-0029	2004	Tobias Picker	Symphony No. 2 / String Quartet No. 1	CD	
FECD-0030	2004	Toshiro Mayuzumi	Pieces for Prepared Piano and Strings / Samsara, Symphonic Poem	CD	from 636, 666
FECD-0031	2004	Darius Milhaud	Overture Mediterraneenne / Kentuckiana / Cortege Funebre / Quatre Chansons de Ronsard	CD	from 545-8, 685, 744
FECD-0032	2005	various artists	World Premier Collection – First Edition Music	CD	
FECD-0033	2005	William Bolcom	Symphonies 1 & 3 / Seattle Slew Orchestral Suite	CD	same as LCD007, from 802
FECD-0034	2005	Vincent Persichetti	Serenade No. 5, Op. 43 / Symphony No. 5, Op. 61 / Symphony No. 8	CD	from 606, 706
FECD-0035	2005	Ernst Toch	Miniature Overture / Peter Pan, Op. 76 / Notturno, Op. 77 / Symphony No. 5, Op. 89	CD	from 702, 612, 545-3, 661
FECD-0036	2005	Gian Francesco Malipiero	Fantasie di ogni giorno / Piano Concerto No. 3 / Noturrno di canti e balli	CD	from 545-11, 604, 664
FECD-0037				CD	
FECD-0038				CD	
FECD-0039	2005	Carlos Surinach	Melorhythmic Dramas / Symphonic Variations / Feria Magica Overture / Sinfonietta Flamenca	CD	from 681, 773, 58-4, 545-4
FECD-0040	2005	Boris Blacher	Orchestral Variations on a Theme by Paganini	CD	from 792
FECD-0041				CD	
FECD-0042				CD	
FECD-0043	2005	Alvin Singleton	Shadows / A Yellow Rose Petal / After Fallen Crumbs	CD	
FECD-0044	2005	William Kraft	Contextures II: The Final Beast / Interplay / Of Ceremonies, Pageants, and Celebrations	CD	
FECD-1904	2005	Arthur Bliss, Edmund Rubbra, Malcolm Arnold, John Addison	British Modern, Vol. 1	CD	from 592, 57-6, 731, 695
FECD-1906	2005	Arthur Honegger, Jacques Ibert	Français Moderne, Vol. 1	CD	
FECD-1909	2006	Witold Lutoslawski, Andrzej Panufnik, Krzysztof Penderecki, Alexandre Tansman, Stanisław Skrowaczewski, Karol Rathaus	Polski Nowoczesny (Polish Modern)	CD	from 801, 778, 654, 56-2, 722
FECD-1911	2006	Mátyás Seiber, Antal Doráti, Zoltán Kodály	Magyar Modern (Hungarian Modern)	CD	
unknown	2010	Lars-Erik Larsson, Gunnar De Frumerie, Hilding Rosenberg, Daniel Börtz	Svenska Modern	CD	
unknown	2010	Carlos Chavez, Silvestre Revueltas	Mexicano Moderno, Vol. 1	CD	
unknown	2011	François Morel, Harry Somers, Colin McPhee, John Weinzweig, Jacques Hétu, Derek Healey	Canadian Modern	CD	
unknown	2011	Francis Poulenc, Charles Koechlin, André Jolivet, Henri Sauguet, Marcel Grandjany, Ernest Guiraud	Français Moderne, Vol. 2	CD	
unknown	2011	Paul Hindemith, Morton Gould, Walter Piston	Modern Viola Concertos	CD	
unknown	2011	Edmund Rubbra, Herbert Elwell, Wallingford Riegger, Hilding Rosenberg	Modern Violin Premieres	CD	
unknown	2011	Ernest Bloch, Bernard Reichel, Paul Müller-Zürich, Matthias Bamert	Suisse Moderne	CD	
unknown	2011	Ernst Krenek, Ernst Toch, Gottfried von Einem, Robert Starer	Österreicher Modern (Austrian Modern)	CD	
unknown	2011	Harald Sæverud, Klaus Egge	Norsk Moderne	CD	
unknown	2011	Benjamin Britten, Iain Hamilton, Felix Borowski	British Modern, Vol. 2	CD	
unknown	unknown	Rodolfo Halffter, Héctor Quintanar, Blas Galindo, José Pablo Moncayo	Mexicano Moderno, Vol. 2	CD	
unknown	unknown	Gerardo Gandini, Antonio Tauriello, Roberto Caamaño, Roberto García Morillo	Argentino Moderno	CD	
unknown	unknown	Gustavo Becerra-Schmidt, Alfonso Letelier, Juan Orrego-Salas	Chileno Moderno	CD	
unknown	unknown	Enrique Granados, Joaquin Turina, Rodolfo Halffter	Español Moderno, Vol. 1	CD	
unknown	unknown	Robert Gerhard, Joaquin Rodrigo, Carlos Surinach	Español Moderno, Vol. 2	CD	
unknown	unknown	Luigi Nono, Luigi Dallapiccola, Gian-Francesco Malipiero, Vittorio Rieti, Mario Castelnuovo-Tedesco	Italiano Moderno	CD	
unknown	unknown	Hans Werner Henze, Peter Jona Korn, Boris Blacher, Paul Hindemith, Werner Egk	Deutsche Moderne	CD	
unknown	unknown	Paul Ben-Haim, Yoav Talmi	Israeli Modern	CD	
