= Boston School (music) =

The Boston School (also called the Stravinsky School) was a group of composers, most of them Jewish, from Boston, Massachusetts who were influenced by the neoclassicism of Igor Stravinsky:

- Arthur Berger
- Irving Fine
- Lukas Foss
- Alexei Haieff
- Harold Shapero
- Claudio Spies
- Leonard Bernstein
- Ingolf Dahl
- John Lessard
- Louise Talma

Many of them studied with Nadia Boulanger. Irving Fine described the music of Stravinsky and his followers as "diatonic and tonal or quasi-modal", pandiatonic, and concerned with chord spacing and rhythm.

== See also ==
- The Second New England School, also known as the "Boston Six"
