= Henri Lazarof =

Bulgarian-American composer (1932–2013)

Henri Lazarof (Bulgarian: Хенри Лазаров) (April 12, 1932 – December 29, 2013) was a Bulgarian-American composer.

Born in Sofia, Bulgaria, his formal musical training began in Israel under Paul Ben-Haim. After a short stint in Rome, Lazarof settled in the United States, studying with Harold Shapero and Arthur Berger at Brandeis University. After earning a master's degree in 1959, Lazarof began teaching composition at UCLA and was active in promoting the music of his contemporaries. In 1987 he was given the title Professor Emeritus at UCLA. He died of Alzheimer's Disease in Los Angeles on December 29, 2013.

Lazarof wrote seven symphonies, nine string quartets, concerti for clarinet, violin and cello, a string octet, and various chamber music. But perhaps he is best known for his Tableaux for piano and orchestra. His music has been recorded on the Composers Recordings, Inc., Naxos Records, Delos and Laurel Records labels. In total, he produced 126 pieces of music during his career.

In December 2007, Janice and Henri Lazarof gave the Los Angeles County Museum of Art 130 mostly Modernist works estimated to be worth more than $100 million. The collection includes 20 works by Picasso, watercolors and paintings by Paul Klee and Wassily Kandinsky and a considerable number of sculptures by Alberto Giacometti, Constantin Brâncuși, Henry Moore, Willem de Kooning, Joan Miró, Louise Nevelson, Archipenko and Arp.

His notable students include Edward Applebaum, Don Davis and Daniel Kessner. See: List of music students by teacher: K to M#Henri Lazarof.
