= Faia =

Faia may refer to:

== People ==
Given name

- Faia Younan (born 1992), Syrian singer

Surname

- Carl Faia (born 1962), American composer and musician
- Priscilla Faia (born 1985), Canadian actor and writer

== Places ==
- Faia, a civil parish in the municipality of Cabeceiras de Basto, Portugal

== Other uses ==
- Fellow of the American Institute of Architects
- Fellow of the Association of International Accountants
