= Permafrost (disambiguation) =

Permafrost is permanently frozen ground found in periglacial zones.

Permafrost may also refer to:

- "Permafrost" (story), a 1987 Hugo Award winning novelette by Roger Zelazny
- Permafrost: Literary Journal, the student newspaper of the University of Alaska Fairbanks English department
- Permafrost (album), a 1993 dark ambient album by Thomas Köner
- "Permafrost", a track from the 1979 album Secondhand Daylight by UK-based post-punk band Magazine
- Permafrost, a character on the Static Shock television series
- Dr. Permafrost, a (nominal) villain of the comic series Tom Strong
- Permafrost, a zone in the fictional universe of EverQuest, a computer game
