= Daikan (disambiguation) =

Daikan has various meanings:

- Daikan (代官) was a magistrate in Japanese history; see for example Daikansho.
- Daikan (大寒) is the Japanese word for Dahan (solar term), the coldest part of the year.
- Daikan (大韓) is a word meaning "Korea" in Japanese pronunciations of names like Daikan Minkoku (大韓民國) (the Republic of Korea) and Daikan Kōkū (大韓航空) (Korean Air Lines).
- Daikan (album)
