= Robert Sanders =

Robert Sanders may refer to:

- Robert Sanders, 1st Baron Bayford (1867–1940), English politician
- Robert Sanders (composer) (1906–1974), American composer
- Robert Sanders (writer) (1727–1783), Scottish hack writer in London
- Robert L. Sanders (born 1961) American politician in Mississippi
- Robert Sanders (mayor) (1705–1765), mayor of Albany, New York

== See also ==
- Bob Sanders (born 1981), American football player
- Bob Sanders (American football coach) (born 1953)
- Bob Sanders, fictional character from the 1969 film, Bob & Carol & Ted & Alice
