= Symphony for Classical Orchestra (Shapero) =

Harold Shapero completed the Symphony for Classical Orchestra in B♭ major on March 10, 1947, in Newton Centre, Massachusetts. Although labelled "Classical," many of the work's features point to Beethoven rather than Haydn or Mozart, such as "the way in which Shapero paces himself, alternating long passages in the tonic and the dominant, with fast, dramatic modulations often reserved for transitions and developments."

Nicolas Slonimsky remarked on how the piece is "premeditatedly cast in the proclamatory key of B-flat major, the natural tonality of the bugle, and ending in a display of tonic major triads." But there are modern features as well, with "the work's orchestration, in general, ... distinctively bright and brassy, and undoubtedly derived a fair amount from Piston and Copland, as well as from the composer's experience as a dance band arranger."

== History ==
The symphony was given its premiere performance by Leonard Bernstein conducting the Boston Symphony Orchestra on January 30, 1948 and later in Hague. "Bernstein went on ... to record the whole work with the Columbia Symphony Orchestra, a recording rough in spots, but whose passion and finesse clearly suited the music." By the end of the twentieth century, there was only one other recording of the piece, by André Previn and the Los Angeles Philharmonic Orchestra, a fact that has not helped the work's reception. Aaron Copland thought highly of Shapero but did not like his inclination to "hide the brilliance of his own gifts behind the cloak of the great masters." Of Copland's works, Shapero always admired the Short Symphony, even after Copland's popular Symphony No. 3, of which "Shapero criticized, among other things, the first movement's trombone melody."

Much later on in his life, Copland dedicated one of his Emily Dickinson settings to Shapero. Prior to the Symphony for Classical Orchestra, the composer, still in his twenties, "was producing a series of chamber and orchestral works, each one longer and grander than the last," but afterwards wrote rather little music for the rest of his life. Fellow composer Arthur Berger, who like Shapero was a member of the "Harvard Stravinsky school, and considered the latter to be "arguably the most talented of us all," was puzzled by the way the latter's "composing activity tapered off" after "this illustrious beginning."

== Music ==
It is written for an orchestra consisting of piccolo, 2 flutes, 2 oboes, 2 clarinets in B♭, 2 bassoons, contrabassoon, 2 horns in F, 2 trumpets in C, 2 tenor trombones and one bass (silent until the Finale), timpani, and strings.

The work is in four movements:

1. Adagio = 48, 3/8 — Allegro = 120, 2/2
2. Adagietto = 54, E♭ major, 8/8
3. Vivace . = 132 a due battute or . = 138 a quattro battute, G major — E major — G major
4. Allegro con spirito = 138–144

Some commentators have found hints of the blues in the slow introduction to the first movement.

The Adagietto's theme "is classically balletic, with supple rhythms, graceful turns, sighing fourths, and sweet appoggiaturas and suspensions." The movement consists of "quasi-variations that ... are organized according to the sonata principle."

For the Scherzo, Shapero indicates it could be taken at two measures (battute) or four measures. These instructions naturally suggest the influence of Beethoven's Ninth Symphony, but the scherzo theme itself ... points more directly to the Third; Shapero updates Beethoven's two-note idea ... to include a jazzy flatted third. The movement contains other Beethovenian features: ghostly chromatics, ... a sort of peasant stomping, ... and a generous sense of humor, sometimes quite broad."

The Finale is rich in interconnections to the preceding movements, but especially the first movement.
