= Richard Wernick =

American composer (1934–2025)

- Born: January 16, 1934; Massachusetts, U.S.
- Died: April 25, 2025 (aged 91); Haverford, Pennsylvania, U.S.
- Occupation: Composer
- Notable work: Visions of Terror and Wonder
- Awards: Pulitzer Prize for Music (1977)

Richard Frank Wernick (January 16, 1934 – April 25, 2025) was an American composer. He is best known for his chamber and vocal works. His composition Visions of Terror and Wonder won the 1977 Pulitzer Prize for Music.

== Life and career ==
Wernick was born January 16, 1934. His birthplace is reported variously as Newton, Massachusetts, or Boston. He began his musical studies playing the piano at age 11. His high school music theory teacher took notice of his abilities, and introduced him to Irving Fine, who was a composition professor at Harvard University at the time. Wernick went on to complete his undergraduate studies with Fine at Brandeis University. While at Brandeis, Wernick also studied with Harold Shapero, Arthur Berger, and Leonard Bernstein. His studies at Tanglewood included composition work with Ernst Toch, Aaron Copland, and Boris Blacher and conducting studies with Leonard Bernstein and Seymour Lipkin. Wernick also studied at Mills College with Leon Kirchner.

During the 1950s and early 1960s, Wernick worked as a theater, film, television, and dance composer. His output during this time includes the film score for the short comedy A Bowl of Cherries.

Wernick spent much of his career as a composition professor, teaching at SUNY Buffalo (1964–1965) and the University of Chicago (1965–1968). However, his longest tenure was at the University of Pennsylvania, from 1968 to 1996. For his notable students, See: List of music students by teacher: T to Z#Richard Wernick. David Patrick Stearns of The Philadelphia Inquirer considered Wernick's time at Penn, especially during the 1970s, to represent the height of his compositional influence as part of the university's composition "triumvirate" (Wernick, George Crumb, and George Rochberg).

In 1983, Riccardo Muti selected Wernick to be the Consultant for New Music to the Philadelphia Orchestra. His role as advisor was to assist Muti in identifying new works for the Philadelphia Orchestra to perform, with a stated emphasis on American composers. He held this position until 1989, when he was re-appointed Special Consultant to the music director. He continued until the end of Muti's tenure with the Philadelphia Orchestra in 1993.

Three of Wernick’s manuscript scores are held by the Library of Congress. His String Quartet no. 3 was the result of a 1988 commission by the Elizabeth Sprague Coolidge Foundation. His second Library of Congress-affiliated commission was under the auspices of The Serge Koussevitzky Music Foundation. This commission resulted in Wernick’s 1996 Trio for violin, cello, and piano. Fittingly, he was honored as the first commission by The Irving and Verna Fine Fund, for which he composed Quintet for Horn and String Quartet in 2002.

Wernick won the 1977 Pulitzer Prize for Music for his composition Visions of Terror and Wonder. He won Kennedy Center Friedheim Awards in 1986 for his Violin Concerto (first place, tie with Bernard Rands), 1991 (first place, for String Quartet No. 4), and 1992 (second place, for Piano Concerto). He also received awards from the Ford, Guggenheim, and Naumburg Foundations. (See also List of Awards below.)

Wernick lived outside of Philadelphia with his wife, bassoonist Bea Wernick, née Beatrice Messina. His son Adam Wernick is a writer, composer and sound designer. Another son, Lew Wernick, is a guitarist. A third son, Peter, died in 1986. Wernick died April 25, 2025, in Haverford, Pennsylvania, at the age of 91.

== Compositional style ==
Wernick described his style as one that attempts to find common ground with an audience:

My expectation is that I'm not writing down to an audience, but I'm not trying to write above their heads. I'm not writing to an audience which is illiterate and I'm not writing to an audience which is technically educated in music, but I do write for an audience that I assume has experience in listening to music and is willing to at least meet me halfway. So I'll go halfway to meet them."

As such, critics have sometimes identified his style as more audience-accessible, particularly when compared to more strictly serialist composers of the 20th century.

Harmonic analysis of Wernick's work suggests that his style makes reference to tonal harmony, but is usually based on fixed cells of intervals. He occasionally made use of twelve-tone sequences and their permutations, but this technique is not necessarily a defining feature of his output. Wernick also made extensive use of contrapuntal techniques, especially in his string quartets.

In vocal and programmatic works, Wernick's choice of texts often reflect an ideological message. Kaddish Requiem mourns "the victims of Indochina," referring to the contemporaneous Vietnam War as well as to related violence throughout the region. Likewise, the final movement of his Duo for Cello and Piano is a memorial for the World Trade Center attacks on September 11, 2001. Several of his works, most notably Kaddish Requiem and Visions of Terror and Wonder, combine religious texts from multiple traditions.

Performers with whom Wernick frequently worked include the Juilliard String Quartet, the Emerson String Quartet, David Starobin, Mstislav Rostropovich, Jan de Gaetani, Lambert Orkis, and Gregory Fulkerson.

== Works ==
The majority of Wernick's works are published by the Theodore Presser Company Most of his manuscripts are held by the Special Collections of the Van Pelt Library at the University of Pennsylvania. The collection also contains marked scores from premieres of other composers' works that Wernick directed.

== Discography ==
Wernick's works were represented on some of the earliest releases by Bridge Records, a label founded by guitarist David Starobin. His works have also been recorded on Deutsche Grammophon, Nonesuch Records, Centaur Records, Composers Recordings, Inc., and Albany Records.

- Music of Richard Wernick, Bridge Records 9303

Quintet for French Horn and String Quartet, William Purvis, Juilliard String Quartet
Da'ase for Guitar, David Starobin
String Quartet No. 6, Colorado String Quartet
Trochaic Trot, David Starobin
The Name of the Game, David Starobin, International Contemporary Ensemble, Cliff Colnot, conductor

- Duo for Cello and Piano, Scott Kluksdahl, cello, Noreen Cassidy-Polera, piano. Centaur Records 2765: Sound Vessels
- Piano Sonata No. 2, Lambert Orkis. Bridge Records 9131: From Hammers to Bytes
- A Prayer for Jerusalem for Mezzo-Soprano and Percussion, Jan DeGaetani and Glenn Steele. Composers Recordings, Inc. (New World Records) S-344.
- Songs of Remembrance: Four songs for Shawm, English Horn, Oboe and Mezzo-soprano, Jan DeGaetani and Philip West. Nonesuch Records CD 71342.
- Cadenzas and Variations II for Violin Solo, Gregory Fulkerson. New World Records CD 80313: Cadenzas and Variations
- Cadenzas and Variations III for Cello Solo, Scott Kluksdahl. Composers Recordings, Inc. (New World Records) CD 762: Lines for Solo Cello
- Musica Ptolemica for Brass Quintet, Chestnut Brass Company. Albany Records TROY 233: Contemporary Music for Brass Quintet
- String Quartet No. 4, Emerson String Quartet. Deutsche Grammophon 437 537-2: American Contemporaries
- Da'ase for Guitar, David Starobin. Bridge Records CD 9084: Newdance: 18 New Dances for Solo Guitar
- Piano Sonata No. 1: Reflections of a Dark Light, Lambert Orkis. Bridge Records CD 9003: Lambert Orkis plays Music of Crumb and Wernick
- Richard Wernick Bridge Records CD 9082

Concerto for Piano and Orchestra, Lambert Orkis, piano; Symphony II, Richard Wernick, conductor.
Concerto for Violin and Orchestra, Gregory Fulkerson, violin; Symphony II, Larry Rachleff, conductor.

- Contemporary Chamber Players, Richard Wernick, conductor, Neva Pilgrim. Composers Recordings, Inc. (New World Records) S-379 (also CD 817)

Haiku of Basho for Soprano, Flute, Clarinet, Violin, Contrabass, Two Percussion, Piano and Tape.
Moonsongs from the Japanese for Soprano and Two Pre-recorded tracks of Soprano Voice, or Three Solo Sopranos.

- Kaddish-Requiem: A secular service for the victims of Indo-China, Contemporary Chamber Ensemble, Arthur Weisberg, conductor, Jan DeGaetani, mezzo-soprano. Nonesuch Records CD 79222: Spectrum: New American Music
- A Poison Tree for Flute, Clarinet, Violin, Cello, Piano, and Soprano, 20th Century Consort, Christopher Kendall, conductor, Lucy Shelton, soprano. Smithsonian Collection N027
- A Poison Tree for Flute, Clarinet, Violin, Cello, Piano, and Soprano, Syracuse New Music Ensemble, Neva Pilgrim, soprano. Spectrum Records SR-183
- Concerto for Viola: Do Not Go Gentle, Walter Trampler, viola, Pro Arte Chamber Orchestra of Boston, Leon Botstein, conductor. Composers Recordings, Inc. (New World Records) CD 618.

== Awards ==
- 2006: Composer of the Year Award (Classical Recording Foundation)
- 2000: Alfred I Dupont Award
- 1992: Kennedy Center Friedheim Award, 2nd Place
- 1991: Kennedy Center Friedheim Award, 1st Place
- 1986: Kennedy Center Friedheim Award, 1st Place
- 1982: National Endowment for the Arts Composition Grant
- 1979: National Endowment for the Arts Composition Grant
- 1977: Pulitzer Prize in Music
- 1976: Guggenheim Fellowship
- 1976: National Institute of Arts and Letters Music Award
- 1976: Naumberg Recording Award
- 1975: National Endowment for the Arts Composition Grant
- 1962–64: Ford Foundation Composition Grants
