= Edward Applebaum =

American composer (1937–2020)

Edward Applebaum (September 28, 1937 – January 7, 2020) was an American composer of contemporary classical music.

Born in Los Angeles Applebaum began his career as a jazz pianist and conductor. He received a B.A. (1962), M.A. (1963), and Ph.D. (1966) from the University of California, Los Angeles, and also studied at the Royal Academy of Music in Stockholm. His primary teachers were Henri Lazarof and Lukas Foss. In Sweden, he also studied with Ingvar Lidholm.

Applebaum taught composition at the University of Houston and had previously taught at the Shepherd School of Music at Rice University, Edith Cowan University, the University of California, Santa Barbara, Florida State University, and in Norway. He also lectured at The Jung Center of Houston. His notable students include Donald Crockett and Carl Faia.

In 1984, Applebaum received a first-place Kennedy Center Friedheim Award in music composition for his Symphony No. 2. His most notable work is The Princess in the Garden for string orchestra, composed in 1985.

Applebaum also held a particular scholarly interest in the subject of psychotherapy and the arts. His wife was Allyson Brown Applebaum (now Allyson Applebaum Wells).
