= Nunatak Gongamur =

Studio album by Thomas Köner
- Released: 1990
- Genre: Ambient
- Length: 48:23
- Label: Barooni
- Producer: Thomas Köner

Thomas Köner chronology
Nunatak Gongamur (1990)	Teimo (1993)

Professional ratings
Review scores
Source	Rating
Allmusic	link
Muzik	3.5/5 stars

Nunatak Gongamur is the first studio album by the electronic artist Thomas Köner. It was released in 1990 on the Barooni record company. The album contains only one electronically controlled timbre, the gong. Roland Speckle helped with the production of the album. A nunatak is a mountainous rock summit not covered with ice or snow within an ice field or glacier, and is found mostly on the North Pole.

== Track listing ==
1. "Untitled" – 3:23
2. "Untitled" – 6:03
3. "Untitled" – 4:28
4. "Untitled" – 5:22
5. "Untitled" – 6:24
6. "Untitled" – 3:28
7. "Untitled" – 5:06
8. "Untitled" – 3:25
9. "Untitled" – 3:28
10. "Untitled" – 3:12
11. "Untitled" – 4:04
