= Nuuk (album) =

Studio album by Thomas Köner
- Released: 1997
- Genre: Ambient
- Length: 42:07
- Label: Big Cat UK Records
- Producer: Thomas Köner

Thomas Köner chronology
Aubrite (1995)	Nuuk (1997)	Kaamos (1998)

Nuuk is the fifth solo album from German ambient music producer Thomas Köner. Originally released in 1997 as a part of the Driftworks 4-CD box set (along with albums from Nijiumu, Pauline Oliveros & Randy Raine-Reusch and Paul Schütze), it was re-released in 2004 by Mille Plateaux with a DVD containing films made from still images to accompany the music.

== Track listing ==
1. "Nuuk (Air)" – 4:50
2. "Polynya I" – 6:33
3. "Nuuk (Day)" – 7:27
4. "Amras" – 5:37
5. "Nuuk (Night)" - 4:15
6. "Polynya II" - 7:25
7. "Nuuk (End)" - 6:00

2004 DVD

1. "Nuuk (Suite)"
2. "Nuuk (Air)"
3. "Nuuk (Day)"
4. "Nuuk (Night)"
5. "Nuuk (End)"
