= Kennedy Center Friedheim Award =

American music award

The Kennedy Center Friedheim Award was an annual award given for instrumental music composition by the John F. Kennedy Center for the Performing Arts in Washington, D.C. It was established in 1978 and ended in 1995. The award was given only to American composers.

The award was established by Eric Friedheim (1910–2002), the publisher of Travel Agent magazine and a patron of the arts, and funded by the Eric Friedheim Foundation and the Kennedy Center Corporate Fund. He endowed the award in honor of his father, the pianist Arthur Friedheim (1859–1932), who had studied with Franz Liszt.

The first prize was US$5,000, the second prize was $2,500 (originally $2,000), the third prize was $1,000, and the fourth prize was $500. There was no fourth prize until 1984, and the third prize was originally $500. The winners were narrowed down from often over 100 entries, to four or five finalists. The works were performed and the awards were given at an awards ceremony, which was held each year at the John F. Kennedy Center for the Performing Arts. The award alternated every other year between orchestral and chamber music.

From 1978 to 1995, 18 Friedheim Awards concerts were performed, drawn from 1,883 submissions, and a total of $158,500 in cash prizes was distributed to 70 American composers.

The awards came to an end following the last ceremony in 1995, when Eric Friedheim decided to withdraw his financial support, choosing to instead donate his remaining financial assets to the Peabody Institute.

== Winners ==
=== 1978 ===
- Vincent Persichetti (first place)
- Aurelio de la Vega (second place)
- Stanisław Skrowaczewski (third place)

=== 1979 ===
- George Rochberg (first place)
- Claude Baker (second place)
- Claus Adams (third place)

=== 1980 ===
- John Harbison (first place)
- Jacob Druckman (second place)
- Ramon Zupko (third place)

=== 1981 ===
- Joseph Schwantner (first place)
- Peter Tod Lewis (second place, tie)
- Ezra Laderman (second place, tie)
- Dan Locklair (honorable mention)

=== 1982 ===
- Gundaris Pone (first place)
- David Del Tredici (second place)
- Thomas Ludwig (third place)

=== 1983 ===
- Thomas Oboe Lee (first place)
- George Perle (second place)
- Karel Husa (third place)

=== 1984 ===
- Edward Applebaum (first place)
- William Kraft (second place)
- Marilyn Shrude (third place)
- Donald Erb (fourth place, tie)
- Claude Baker (fourth place, tie)

=== 1985 ===
- Robert Erickson (first place, tie)
- Donald Martino (first place, tie)
- Gunther Schuller (second place)
- Stephen Hartke (third place)
- No fourth place awarded

=== 1986 ===
- Richard Wernick (first place, tie)
- Bernard Rands (first place, tie)
- John Adams (second place)
- Joseph Schwantner (third place)
- No fourth place awarded

=== 1987 ===
- Gunther Schuller (first place)
- Barbara Kolb (second place)
- Steven Mackey (third place)
- Tod Machover (fourth place)

=== 1988 ===
- Christopher Rouse (first place)
- George Rochberg (second place)
- Stephen Paulus (third place)
- Joan Tower (fourth place)

=== 1989 ===
- George Tsontakis (first place, tie)
- Chinary Ung (first place, tie)
- No second place was awarded
- David Lang (third place)
- Michael Daugherty (fourth place)

=== 1990 ===
- Ralph Shapey (first place, tie)
- William Kraft (first place, tie)
- Daron Aric Hagen (second place)
- Frederick Bianchi (third place)
- No fourth place awarded

=== 1991 ===
- Richard Wernick (first place)
- Donald Crockett (second place)
- Sebastian Currier (third place)
- Stephen Jaffe (fourth place)

=== 1992 ===
- Shulamit Ran (first place)
- Richard Wernick (second place)
- George Tsontakis (third place)
- Emma Lou Diemer (fourth place)

=== 1993 ===
- David Froom (first place, tie)
- Osvaldo Golijov (first place, tie)
- Dean Drummond (second place, tie)
- Steven Mackey (second place, tie)
- No third or fourth place awarded

=== 1994 ===
- Leon Kirchner (first place)
- Tison Street (second place)
- John Anthony Lennon (third place, tie)
- Jay Alan Yim (third place, tie)
- No fourth place awarded

=== 1995 ===
- Osvaldo Golijov (first place)
- Ezequiel Viñao (second place)
- Bright Sheng (third place)
- Charles Wuorinen (fourth place)
- Miguel del Aguila (fifth place)
