= Kaamos (Thomas Köner album) =

Studio album by Thomas Köner
- Released: 1998
- Genre: Ambient
- Length: 55:37
- Label: Mille Plateaux
- Producer: Thomas Köner

Thomas Köner chronology
Nuuk (1997)	Kaamos (1998)	Unerforschtes Gebiet (2001)

Professional ratings
Review scores
Source	Rating
Allmusic	3/5 stars

Kaamos is the sixth solo album from German ambient music producer, Thomas Köner. It is also the first album Köner released on the label Mille Plateaux.

"Tabula Smaragdina" was recorded live in Auditorium du Louvre, Paris, France in October 1997. It was used as the music to the Jürgen Reble film Chicago.

"Kaamos" is Finnish for "polar night." "Tabula Smaragdina" is Latin for "emerald tablet," it is a mysterious ancient alchemical text.

== Track listing ==
1. "Kaamos" – 12:24
2. "Kaamos" – 6:21
3. "Kaamos" – 12:00
4. "Tabula Smaragdina" – 24:52
