= Aubrite (album) =

Studio album by Thomas Köner
- Released: 1995
- Genre: Ambient
- Length: 49:02
- Label: Barooni
- Producer: Thomas Köner

Thomas Köner chronology
| Permafrost (1993) | Aubrite (1995) | Nuuk (1997) |

Professional ratings
Review scores
| Source | Rating |
|---|---|
| Allmusic | 4/5 stars |
| Muzik | 3/5 stars |

Aubrite is the fourth album from German Ambient music producer, Thomas Köner. It was recorded between April 1994 and March 1995. Roland Speckle helped with production of the album.

"Aubrite" is the name for small meteorites. Nuuk is the capital city of Greenland. Taklamakan is a desert in Central Asia. Grohuk is a small town on Spitsbergen.

== Track listing ==
1. "Nuuk" – 8:20
2. "Aubrite" – 9:13
3. "Grohuk (Day)" – 11:23
4. "Takla Makan" – 6:46
5. "Grohuk (Night)" - 13:20
