= Teimo =

Studio album by Thomas Köner
- Released: 1992
- Genre: Ambient, drone
- Length: 39:28
- Label: Barooni
- Producer: Thomas Köner

Thomas Köner chronology
Nunatak Gongamur (1990)	Teimo (1992)	Permafrost (1993)

Professional ratings
Review scores
Source	Rating
Allmusic	4/5 stars

Teimo is the second solo album from German Ambient music producer, Thomas Köner. Köner has already fully developed his characteristic drone style here. It is also the record which made Köner known in electronic scene and together with next album, "Permafrost" (which were later re-issued in 1996 on one disc by Mille Plateaux - Teimo & Permafrost) is considered by many critics and fans as his best work. Köner used a variety of techniques to record sound on "Teimo". One of which was recording gongs underwater, thus creating an almost disorienting yet beautiful drone.

== Track listing ==
1. "Ilira" - 3:25
2. "Andenes" - 10:06
3. "Teimo" - 5:14
4. "Nieve Penitentes 1" - 3:04
5. "Nieve Penitentes 2" - 4:43
6. "Nieve Penitentes 3" - 4:27
7. "Teimo (Schluss)" - 4:22
8. "Ruska" - 3:40

=== Notes ===
"Andenes" is a village in Norway.

Penitentes are a kind of snow formation, found only at high altitudes.

"Schluss" means "closure, conclusion" in German, and "Ruska" is a Finnish word for autumn leaf color. "Nieve" means "snow" in Spanish.
