= Unerforschtes Gebiet =

Studio album by Thomas Köner
- Released: 2001
- Genre: Ambient
- Length: 42:48
- Label: Die Stadt
- Producer: Thomas Köner

Thomas Köner chronology
Kaamos (1998)	Unerforschtes Gebiet (2001)	Daikan (2002)

Professional ratings
Review scores
Source	Rating
Allmusic	3/5 stars

Unerforschtes Gebiet is the seventh solo album from German ambient music producer, Thomas Köner. Originally released in 2001 only as a limited number picture disc LP (700 numbered copies; repressed in 2004, this time not individually numbered). Re-released on CD in 2003.

"Unerforschtes Gebiet" is German for "unexplored area," typically the blank areas of old maps. The picture on the disc is a map of the Arctic region, the center hole coinciding with the North Pole. The B side has the same image, mirrored.

== Track listing ==
Original LP, catalogue number DS43

1. "Unerforschtes Gebiet A" – 21:17
2. "Unerforschtes Gebiet B" – 21:31

CD re-release, catalogue number DS56

1. "Unerforschtes Gebiet A" – 21:17
2. "Unerforschtes Gebiet B" – 21:31
3. "Les Sœurs Lumière" - 27:26
