= Thomas Köner =

German artist (born 1965)

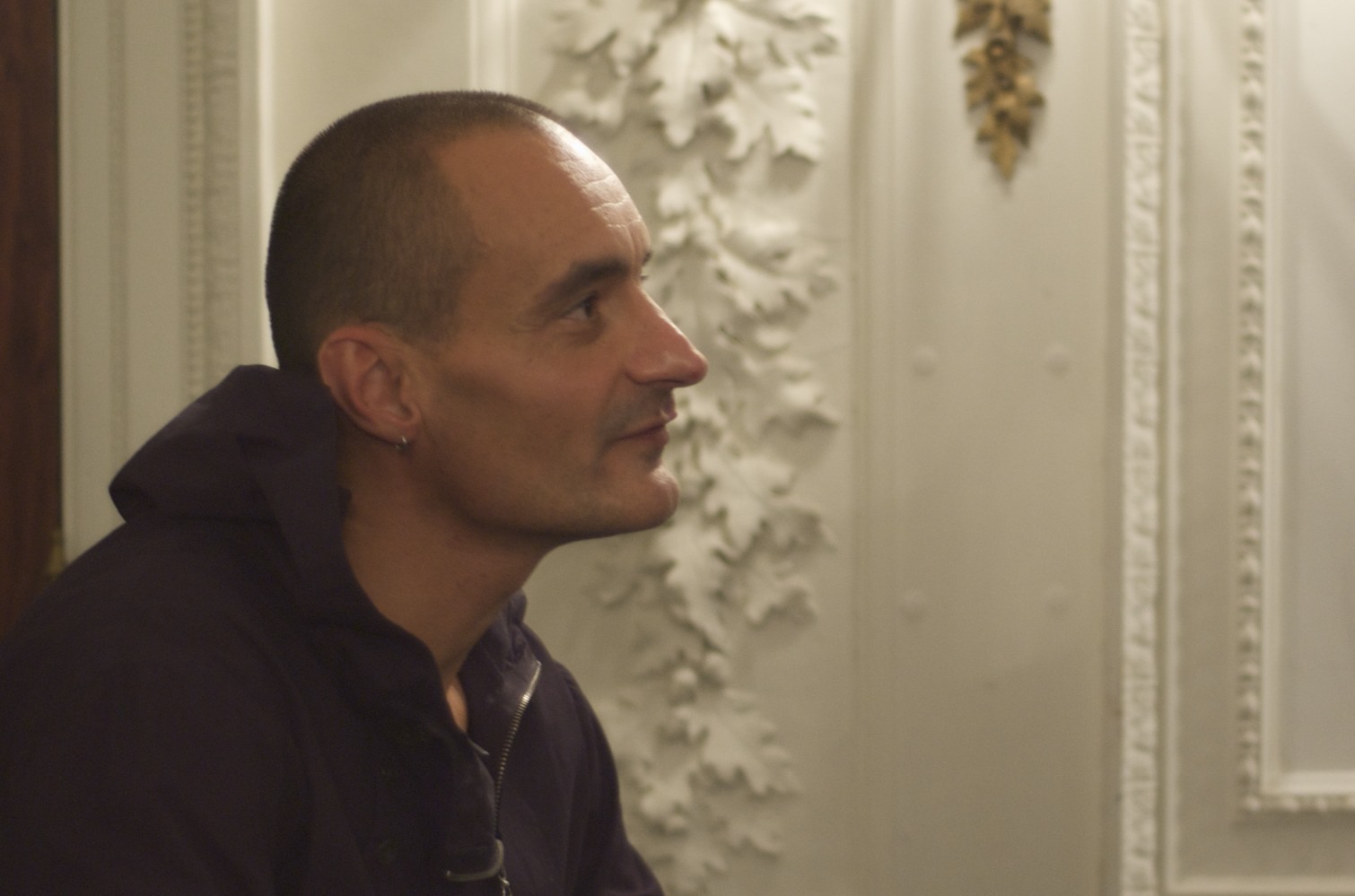
- Köner after a performance at Goethe-Institut Boston (2010)

Background information
- Born: 1965 (age 60–61); Bochum, Germany
- Occupation: Musician
- Labels: Barooni; Denovali; Die Stadt; Fario; Mille Plateaux; Touch
- Member of: Porter Ricks

Thomas Köner (born 1965 in Bochum, West Germany) is a multimedia artist whose main interest lies in combining visual and auditory experiences. The BBC, in a review of Köner's work in 1997, calls him a "media artist," one who works between installation, sound art, ambient music and as one half of Porter Ricks dub techno. A noted characteristics of Köner's dark ambient style are low drones and static soundscapes evocative of desolate, Arctic places.

== Biography ==
For his audio-visual works, Köner was awarded Golden Nica at Prix Ars Electronica in Linz, Transmediale Award, Tiger Cub Award at International Film Festival Rotterdam, ARCO Award Best Young Artist in Madrid, among others.

During Köner's solo exhibition of his video-art at the Musée d'art contemporain de Montreal, the museum described him as a major innovator in the contemporary music scene, as well as noted his collaborative practice which has led to his working with musicians, filmmakers and visual artists on installations and sound performances, and to his creation of six video works produced in two cycles, starting in 2003.

2006 Köner produced Station Eismitte, a work inspired by Alfred Wegener's 1930 arctic expedition and named after the expedition's site.

2009 Köner created The Futurist Manifesto, a digital opera, to coincide with the 100 year anniversary of the famous manifesto published in 1909 by Filippo Tommaso Marinetti. It was commissioned by EMAP/EMARE. This work has been performed live several times in festivals across Europe with Carl Faia and Iris Garrelfs.

Thomas Köner has been creating music for silent films since 1994, which he performs on his own or with a small ensemble. His music for F.W. Murnau’s Faust was commissioned by the Auditorium du Louvre in Paris and was premiered there in 2013 as part of the supporting program of the De l’Allemagne 1800 – 1939 exhibition. So far, he has created and performed scores for 30 silent films including Fritz Lang's Metropolis, F.W. Murnau's Faust and Nosferatu, Lotte Reiniger’s Die Abenteuer Des Prinzen Achmed (The Adventures Of Prince Ahmed) among others.

Writing about his performance of Fritz Lang's Metropolis, Spanish national daily newspaper El Pais said that: "Thomas Köner envelops Metropolis in 21 century sounds".

== Album discography ==
- Nunatak Gongamur (Barooni, 1990)
- Teimo (Barooni, 1992)
- Permafrost (Barooni, 1993)
- Aubrite (Barooni, 1995)
- Nuuk (part of the Driftworks box; Mille Plateaux, 1997)
- Kaamos (Mille Plateaux, 1998)
- Unerforschtes Gebiet (LP picture disc; Die Stadt, 2001)
- Daikan (Mille Plateaux, 2002)
- Zyklop (Mille Plateaux, 2003)
- La Barca (CD version; Fario, 2009)
- Novaya Zemlya (Touch, 2012)
- Cloître (with Jana Winderen; Touch, 2014)
- Tiento de las nieves (Denovali, 2014)
- Tiento de la luz (Denovali, 2016)
- Motus (Mille Plateaux, 2020)

=== Re-releases ===
- Teimo/Permafrost (2xCD re-release; Mille Plateaux, 1997)
- Unerforschtes Gebiet (CD release with bonus track; Die Stadt, 2003)
- Nuuk (CD/DVD; MillePlateauxMedia, 2004)
- Nunatak • Teimo • Permafrost (box re-release; Type, 2010)
- La Barca (expanded 2xLP version; Fario, 2010)
- La Barca (complete edition) (further expanded download version; self-released, 2014)

=== as Porter Ricks (with Andy Mellwig) ===
- Biokinetics (Chain Reaction, 1996)
- Porter Ricks (Mille Plateaux, 1997)
- Porter Ricks : Techno Animal Symbiotics (Force Inc. Music Works, 1999)
- Shadow Boat (Tresor, 2016)
- Anguilla Electrica (Tresor, 2017)

=== as Kontakt der Jünglinge (with Asmus Tietchens) ===
- 0 (Die Stadt, 2001)
- 1 (Die Stadt, 2001)
- -1 (Die Stadt, 2002)
- n (Die Stadt, 2003)
- Makrophonie 1 (Die Stadt, 2014)

== Awards ==
- German Sound Art Award Deutsche Klangkunst-Preis / Produktionspreis WDR, Marl, 2004
- Golden Nica, Prix Ars Electronica, Linz, 2004
- Tiger Cub Award, Best Short, International Film Festival Rotterdam, 2005
- transmediale.05 Award, International Media Art Festival, Berlin, 2005
- ARCO Award Best Young Artist at Arco, Feria International de Arte Contemporaneo, Madrid, 2005
- Off Screen Award Best New Media Work, Images Festival Toronto, 2007
- MuVi-Award for best German Music video, 55. International Short Film Festival Oberhausen, 2009
- Nomination for Nam June Paik Award, 2012

== Artist-in-residence ==
- Cité International des Arts, Paris, 2001
- Villa Aurora, Los Angeles, 2006
- Villa Kamogawa, Kyoto, 2016

== See also ==
- List of ambient music artists
