= Harold Shapero =

American composer

Harold Samuel Shapero (April 29, 1920 – May 17, 2013) was an American composer.

== Early years ==
Shapero was born in Lynn, Massachusetts, on April 29, 1920. He and his family later moved to nearby Newton. He learned to play the piano as a child, and for some years was a pianist in dance orchestras. With a friend, he founded the Hal Kenny Orchestra, a swing-era jazz band.

He was more interested in classical music. In his teens some of his teachers included Nicolas Slonimsky (editor of Baker's Biographical Dictionary of Musicians) in 1936 and Ernst Krenek in 1937. At 18 he entered Harvard, where he became friends with Leonard Bernstein and studied composition with Walter Piston in 1938. He also studied with Paul Hindemith at the Berkshire Music Center in 1940–41.

Shapero was one of the first students at Tanglewood following its founding in the 1940s. When Igor Stravinsky was Norton Professor at Harvard in 1940, Shapero showed Stravinsky his Nine-Minute Overture. Shapero hoped to get the Overture played at Tanglewood that summer, but Hindemith ordered that no student compositions would be played that season. Aaron Copland hastily put together an orchestra to play student compositions, including Shapero's Overture. Shapero was awarded the Rome Prize in 1941 for his Nine-Minute Overture, which included a $1000 award. World War II prevented him from taking advantage of the residency in Italy the prize provided.

At Harvard he held the Naumberg and Paine Fellowships. After graduating in 1941, Shapero undertook further studies with Nadia Boulanger at the Longy School of Music in 1942–43. While studying with her, Shapero was also in contact with Stravinsky, who was helpful in his critiques of Shapero's music.

== Postwar years ==
Shapero's output was prolific in the 1940s and included three piano sonatas, the Sonata for Violin and Piano, and a variety of songs and works for chamber ensembles. His major work was the Symphony for Classical Orchestra, a 45-minute work in four movements. Decades later, he told a New York Times interviewer that he was unaware while composing it of how lengthy it had become, that he "had wildly miscalculated my materials. When I measured out the slow movement, I was shocked. It was 15 minutes. I stopped working for a month. Then I tried to cut the thing. But it fought me and won. Slowly I became aware, with horror, of what I was writing: a long and difficult symphony. I thought I'd never get it performed". In 1946 Shapero won the Joseph H. Bearns Prize of US$1200 for a Symphony for String Orchestra. Leonard Bernstein "fell in love" with the Symphony for Classical Orchestra and led its premiere with the Boston Symphony Orchestra in January 1948. George Szell, though far less enthusiastic about the work, gave its second performance with the Cleveland Orchestra in March. Reviews were mixed. It received an award from the Koussevitsky Foundation. Bernstein recorded the work in 1953, but it was largely forgotten until revived in 1986 by André Previn to positive reviews. Previn recorded the work and played it several times with other orchestras.

In 1945, Shapero married the painter Esther Geller. Throughout the rest of the decade they were often residents at the MacDowell Colony in Peterborough, New Hampshire. In 1946 he won the second annual George Gershwin Memorial Contest for his Serenade in D, which included a performance of one movement from the work at Carnegie Hall on February 13, 1946. The prize also included publication of the score with royalties and US$1000. It was the first time Shapero had a score published.

Aaron Copland thought highly of Shapero's technical skill and the spontaneity of musical inspiration. Once, after being impressed with Shapero's Woodwind Quintet, he teased Leonard Bernstein, who was two years ahead of Shapero at Harvard with a note: "Look to your laurels! There may be another composer in your neighborhood!" But in a 1948 New York Times article, he wrote: "Stylistically, Shapero seems to feel a compulsion to fashion his music after some great model. Thus, his ... Serenade ... is founded upon neoclassical Stravinskian principles, his three Amateur Piano Sonatas on Haydnesque principles, and his recent long Symphony [for Classical Orchestra] is modeled after Beethoven.... [H]e seems to be suffering from a hero-worship complex—or perhaps it is a freakish attack of false modesty".

In the 1940s Shapero was closely associated with fellow Piston students Arthur Berger and Irving Fine in a "Stravinsky school" of American composers—a phrase first coined by Copland. He was also grouped in the "Boston school" along with Arthur Berger, Lukas Foss, Irving Fine, Alexeï Haieff, and Claudio Spies.

He won a Guggenheim Fellowship in 1946. He won the first of his two Fulbright Fellowships in 1948.

His output fell off by the 1960s as his neo-classical style met increasing resistance, especially in academic music circles. He told an interviewer in 1986 that "Comfortable university life is a disaster, especially if you have a university that doesn’t pressure you to produce or perish. And I had a young child. I like home handicrafts and hobbies. I like gardening. I like photography. So it was only too easy to put off some of those hard operations like writing music".

In 1951 he was a fellow of the American Academy in Rome. That same year, Brandeis University hired Shapero and he later became chairman of the department and founder of its electronic music studio with the day's most advanced synthesizers. He taught at Brandeis for 37 years. His notable students include John Adams, Gustav Ciamaga, Scott Wheeler, and Richard Wernick.

His daughter, Hannah Shapero, was born in 1953. She became a commercial artist and electronic musician.

When Bernstein and the New York Philharmonic played the local premiere of Shapero's Credo in 1958, a work commissioned by the Louisville Orchestra, Harold Schonberg wrote: "The new Shapero work is in one movement, lasts about eight and a half minutes, ... a quiet and sensitive mood piece, harmonically rather conservative (a Copland type of conservatism, with strong echoes of Our Town), but unmistakably of this generation. Mr. Shapero orchestrates beautifully; some of his combinations are very effective".

== Later years ==
When awarded his second Fulbright Fellowship in 1961, Shapero took the opportunity to travel to Europe with his family for a year. In 1971 he returned to Europe to be composer-in-residence at the American Academy in Rome.

In 1988, Shapero was forced to retire from Brandeis University. Encouraged by André Previn's interest in his work in the late 1980s, Shapero returned to composition. His late works included Three Hebrew Songs for Tenor, Piano and String Orchestra (1989) and, not long before his death, 24 Bagatelles for Piano.

Shapero died in a nursing home in Cambridge, Massachusetts, on May 17, 2013, following complications from pneumonia.

== Analyses ==
Symphony for Classical Orchestra. The instrumentation is largely classical with a few modern additions: woodwinds in pairs, plus piccolo and contrabassoon, pairs of horns and trumpets, three trombones, three timpani, and the standard complement of strings. Alan Rich called it "the greatest American symphony". Anthony Tommasini has described it:

The models for Mr. Shapero, in this work and in general, were Stravinsky, who was then in his prolonged Neo-Classical period, and Beethoven, who remains Mr. Shapero's hero. Indeed, the Symphony for Classical Orchestra is in some ways a soul mate of Beethoven's Seventh Symphony, which it slyly quotes.

As in the Beethoven, the first of its four movements opens with an Adagio that shimmers with flickering colors and sustained harmonies, leading to a long, bustling, contrapuntal Allegro. The second movement is a wistfully lyrical yet rhythmically restless Adagietto; then comes a misbehaving Scherzo, which hurtles toward the imposingly structured but spirited Finale.

Mr. Shapero, however, fractures the Classical models while paying homage. The piece is essentially tonal, with the outer movements hewing to B flat; but the harmonic language contains elements of polytonality, and the music is spiky with dissonance, rhythmically shifty and utterly fresh. Phrases are filled with surprising asymmetries. There is a youthful challenge in Mr. Shapero's tribute, as if he were saying, "Take that, Beethoven!" It's the same quality that you hear in early Beethoven: "I'll show you, my revered teacher Haydn, how to write a piano sonata." Or that you see in early Picasso: "Take that, Cézanne!"

In the Los Angeles Times, Martin Bernheimer wrote of a 1986 performance of the Symphony that "Shapero reveals himself here as a superb craftsman, an artist totally in control of the grandiose variables at hand." He called the writing "clever, subtle, elegant" and added that the symphony "isn't affecting in spite of the inherent anachronisms, but because of them".

While Shapero uses some modern notation in his scores, he employs only procedures that have already been established by other modern composers or that are derived from traditional notation.

== Compositions ==
- String Trio (1937)
- Five Poems of E. E. Cummings for baritone & piano (1938)
- Trumpet Sonata (1940)
- Nine-Minute Overture (1940)
- String Quartet (1941)
- Sonata for Piano, Four Hands (1941)
- Violin Sonata (1942)
- Three Amateur Sonatas (1944)
- Serenade in D for String Orchestra (1945)
- Variations in C minor for Piano (1947)
- Symphony for Classical Orchestra (1947)
- "The Traveler" Overture rev. as Sinfonia (1948)
- Piano Sonata in F Minor (1948)
- Credo for Orchestra (1955)
- "On Green Mountain" for Jazz Ensemble (1957)
- "Woodrow Wilson" Music for the television documentary (1959)
- Partita in C for Piano and Small Orchestra (1960)
- Hebrew Cantata for Mixed Chorus, Soprano, Alto, Tenor and Baritone Soloists and Flute, Trumpet, Viola, Harp and Organ (1965?)
- Three Hebrew Songs for Tenor, Piano & Strings (1988)
- "In the Family" for Trombone and Flute (1991)
- "Six for Five" for Wind Quintet (1995)
- Trumpet Concerto (1995)
- Serenade in D for String Quintet, arrangement of Serenade in D for String Orchestra (1998)
- Whittier Songs for soprano, tenor, flute, cello & piano (2005–07)
