= Carlos Surinach =

American classical composer

Carlos Suriñach (or Carles Suriñach) i Wrokona (Catalan pronunciation: [ˈkaɾləs suɾiˈɲak]; March 4, 1915 – November 12, 1997) was a Spanish-born composer and conductor.

== Early life ==
Carlos Suriñach was born in Barcelona, Spain on March 6 of 1915. His Austrian-Polish mother was a house pianist, introducing him to music at a young age. He began playing the piano between ages 5–6 and started the formal study of music at around age 10. His father was involved in business as a stockbroker. He did not approve of Suriñach pursuing music and confided in their other son, who followed in his footsteps of business. He said that he was never serious about music but always loved it. Taught by his mother through age 14, he studied piano and music theory at the Caminals Academy of Music. He held conducting posts at the Orquestra Simfònica de Barcelona and the Gran Teatre del Liceu. He studied composition and orchestration under Enrique Morera, who was the director of Barcelona Conservatory. He then went to Madrid before moving to Germany, where he studied in Berlin with Max Trapp and Richard Strauss, taking five of Strauss' seminars. In 1944, he returned to Barcelona as the new conductor of the Barcelona Philharmonic Orchestra, where his opera El mozo que casó con mujer brava and "Passacaglia-Sinfonia" was premiered. By his mid 20s, he transformed from an inside composer to an outside composer, with the help of the opera house and conductor position.

== Career ==
In late 1950, Carlos Suriñach emigrated to the United States in hopes of becoming a successful published composer. World War II had just recently ended and European publishers were frantically republishing previous music of the greats: Beethoven, Mendelssohn, Chopin, etc. Full of ambition, he first stopped in New York to conduct an orchestra. In May 1951, a concert featuring the New York's most elite artists was held at the Museum of Modern Art. Works of his, Martha Graham, Israel's Batsheva, Jose Lemon, Balanchine, Doris Humphrey, and many others were all featured in the concert. His first lively premiere of Ritmo Jondo, repeated itself as requested by the audience. The composition was 6 minutes in duration, written for the clarinet, trumpet, xylophone, timpani, and 3 hand clappers. Carlos Suriñach's work was unknown until this point. The performance pivoted his career to an upward hill. Only a week after the concert, Doris Humphrey and Jose Limon came to his apartment to request and discuss using his compositions in a ballet. The successful collaboration was showcased in April 1953 at the Alvin Theatre. He wrote the 20 minute-long work for a broadway orchestra made of 23 musicians. Near after, he worked more closely with Doris Humphrey to create a second version of the ballet. He conducted numerous recordings with MGM Records. Years following the premiere of "Ritmo Jondo,” choreographer, Martha Graham, approached Suriñach. She had purchased a recording including one of his tracks, and had proceeded to choreograph an 8-minute piece without Suriñach's knowledge. Although this was illegal, he turned a blind eye after watching the piece. He was full of passion while watching the piece and admired Graham for her brilliance. In addition to using the single track, Graham requested to work with him, lengthening the piece and supplementing the orchestration. He composed three ballet scores Martha Graham: Embattled Garden (1958), Acrobats of God (1960), and The Owl and the Pussycat (1978). Martha Graham was awarded a Capezio Prize for "Acrobats of God" and gave him a massive commission for his compositional work. It is also noteworthy that the production of "The Owl and the Pussycat" came together in a short six months. Another collaboration, Agathe's Tale, choreographed by Paul Taylor, was premiered in 1967. Surinach also composed Feast of Ashes for the Joffrey Ballet. Showcased on numerous occasions by the Louisville Symphony and Orchestra, under Rockefeller, the conductor's commissions were $1 million each. Reworking original electronic music, Suriñach composed "Chronic" the ballet, performed at the Mark Hellinger Theatre in 1973. His Harp Concerto was commissioned by Charles Royce for his daughter Maria. The premiere was in Grand Rapids, Michigan, in 1978, with Nicanor Zabaleta playing the solo part. The concerto was then performed by Maria Royce at Interlochen. The Surinach Harp Concerto has not been played since. Traditional elements of flamenco, Spanish culture, and American-born music makes Suriñach a unique composer.

Carlos Suriñach became a U.S. citizen in 1959.

Surinach also orchestrated part of Isaac Albéniz's piano suite Iberia.

His notable students include Louis W. Ballard.

He worked with many choreographers including Doris Humphrey, Jose Limon, Martha Graham, Paul Taylor, Robert Coin, Antonio at the Ballets of Madrid, and more.

Surinach died in New Haven, Connecticut, United States, on November 12, 1997.

The BMI Foundation sponsors The Carlos Surinach Awards and Commissioning Programs, which recognizes talented emerging young musicians for their service to American music and funds the creation of new works by former winners of the BMI Student Composer Awards. The program was established by a bequest from Surinach.

The final "ch" in Surinach's surname is pronounced "k", following ancient Catalan orthography (in modern orthography this phoneme is rendered with a "c"). The "ch" ending is commonly found in Catalan surnames, many of which retain this spelling. Also, before Surinach left Spain, his surname was spelled "Suriñach", with a tilde over the "n". He eventually dropped this tilde, but saw the original spelling used on concert posters whenever he visited he Spain. The standard Catalan spelling of his name would be Surinyach, or Surinyac .

== Works ==
- Symphony No. 1, Sinfonía Passacaglia (1945)
- El mozo que casó con mujer brava (1948), opera
- Symphony No. 2 (1949–50)
- Sinfonietta Flamenca (1953)
- Ritmo Jondo (1953), ballet
- Hollywood Carnival (1954)
- Fandango (1954)
- Feria Magica (1956), overture
- Concertino for Piano, Strings and Cymbals (1956)
- Symphony No. 3, Sinfonía Chica (1957)
- Embattled Garden (1958), ballet
- Paeans and Dances of Heathen Iberia (1959)
- Sonatina (1959), for solo guitar
- Acrobats of God (1960), ballet
- Symphonic Variations for Orchestra (1962)
- Feast of Ashes (1962), ballet
- Cantata of St. John (1962)
- Songs of the Soul (1964), for chorus
- Drama Jondo (1965)
- Melorhythmic Dramas (1966)
- Flamenco Cyclothymia (1967)
- Via Crucis: a cycle of fifteen saetas (1970), for chorus and guitar
- Concerto for piano and orchestra (1973)
- Prayers (1973), for solo voice
- Chronique (1974), ballet
- Celebraciones Medievales (1977), for chorus
- Concerto for String Orchestra (1978)
- The Owl and the Pussycat (1978), ballet
- Harp Concerto (1978)
- Violin Concerto (1980)
- Melismas sinfónicos (1985)
- Quimera (1989), ballet
- Double concerto for flute, double bass and chamber orchestra (1990)
