= Paul Ramsier =

American classical composer (1937–2021)

Paul Ramsier (September 23, 1937 – January 31, 2021) was an American classical composer most noted for his contributions to the bass literature.

Ramsier, born in Louisville, Kentucky, showed promise as a pianist at the age of five, and began composing at nine. At sixteen, he entered the University of Louisville School of Music. His graduate studies included piano with Beveridge Webster at the Juilliard School and composition with Ernst von Dohnányi at Florida State University. In his early career in New York City, he was a staff pianist with the New York City Ballet where he was influenced by Balanchine and Stravinsky. During that period he studied composition with Alexei Haieff.

Ramsier's output includes orchestral, opera, choral, instrumental and chamber works, but his best known contribution to contemporary music is his body of work for the double bass, which has established him as a major figure in the development of the instrument. His renowned double bass compositions include four works with orchestra beginning with the landmark Divertimento Concertante on a Theme of Couperin. The Divertimento Concertante and three subsequent works—Road to Hamelin, Eusebius Revisited, and Silent Movie—have since become bass standards, and are regarded as the most performed compositions for bass and orchestra since 1965. His one-act opera, The Man on the Bearskin Rug, is also well-known and frequently performed.

There have been well over 150 performances of Ramsier's bass works with orchestral ensembles including the: Chicago Symphony, Toronto Symphony, London Symphony Orchestra, Hong Kong Philharmonic, Melbourne (Australia) Symphony, Rotterdam Philharmonic, Puerto Rico Symphony, Montevideo Symphony, Minnesota Orchestra, Indianapolis Symphony, Kansas City Symphony, Columbus Symphony, Atlanta Symphony, Israel Sinfonia, Louisville Orchestra, Istanbul State Symphony, Florida Symphony, Atlantic Symphony, Basel Symphony, Zurich Chamber Orchestra, McGill Chamber Orchestra, and I Musici de Montreal.

Ramsier taught composition at New York University and the Ohio State University. After earning a Ph.D., he turned his attention to the study of psychoanalysis, and pursued a double career: psychotherapy and musical composition. Ramsier composed and practiced psychotherapy in Sarasota, Florida. After moving to Sarasota, the Florida West Coast Symphony presented five of his compositions, including one commissioned by the orchestra. Ramsier died on January 31, 2021, at the age of 83.
