= Gundaris Pone =

American classical composer

Gundaris Pone (October 17, 1932 – March 15, 1994) was a Latvian-American composer of contemporary classical music, conductor, and professor.

Born in Riga, Latvia, he emigrated to the United States in 1950, after his fleeing the advancing Soviet troops, where he earned a doctorate in music from the University of Minnesota in 1962.

In 1963 he moved to New Paltz, New York, where he served as a professor at the State University College at New Paltz, New York. He was a winner of a Kennedy Center Friedheim Award (first place, 1982).

== Death, family, and legacy ==
He died of cancer at the Benedictine Hospital in Kingston, New York on March 15, 1994, at the age of 61. His wife was a concert pianist. Pone and his wife had two children. Adrian Pone, Born December 20, 1964, was a colonel and fighter pilot in the United States Air Force. Adrian died in an auto accident on January 20, 2010.

His notable students include Craig Fryer, David J. Sosnowski, and Roberto Bolero Noriega.
