= Daikan (album) =

Studio album by Thomas Köner
- Released: 2002
- Genre: Ambient
- Length: 54:59
- Label: Mille Plateaux
- Producer: Thomas Köner

Thomas Köner chronology
Unerforschtes Gebiet (2001)	Daikan (2002)	Zyklop (2003)

Professional ratings
Review scores
Source	Rating
Allmusic	(3.0/5.0)

Daikan is the eighth album from German ambient music producer Thomas Köner. It contains one hour-long track recorded at the 2000 European Media Arts Festival in Osnabrück, Germany. "Daikan" means "coldest" in Japanese. Catalogue number: MP 107 CD.

== Track listing ==
1. "Daikan" - 54:59
