= Thomas Ludwig =

American composer (born 1952)

- Born: August 27, 1952 (age 74); Detroit, Michigan, United States
- Occupations: Composer, conductor
- Years active: 1970–present
- Website: LudwigSymphony.org

Thomas Ludwig is an American composer of classical music and a symphony conductor. His works have been performed and recorded with orchestras such as the London Symphony Orchestra, Indianapolis Symphony Orchestra, and the New York City Symphony, and have won prizes at the Kennedy Center Friedheim Awards in Washington, D.C. and the Indiana State University Contemporary Music Festival.

Former adjunct professor of music at American University in Washington, D.C., Thomas Ludwig is currently the founder and music director of the Ludwig Symphony Orchestra and the Beethoven Chamber Orchestra in Atlanta. He has conducted orchestras internationally including the London Symphony Orchestra, the Prague Chamber Orchestra, the Odessa Symphony Orchestra, the Orchestra Da Camera Fiorentina in Italy, OFUNAM in Mexico City, and in the United States at the Kennedy Center Opera House in Washington, D.C., Dorothy Chandler Pavilion in Los Angeles, San Francisco Opera House, the Lyric Opera of Chicago and the Metropolitan Opera House in New York.

== Life and career ==
Born in Detroit, Michigan, Ludwig began early studies on violin there with Mischa Mischakoff and then attended the Juilliard School in New York with a full scholarship-graduating in violin studies with Ivan Galamian and viola studies with Paul Doktor. At the age of 22, he became music director of the New York City Symphony performing symphonic concerts at Lincoln Center. In 1978 and 1979 he served as resident conductor for Mikhail Baryshnikov and American Ballet Theatre at the Metropolitan Opera House and on tour across the United States.

In 1980, Thomas Ludwig conducted the London Symphony Orchestra at Abbey Road Studios and recorded his Symphony in Two Movements. The New York Times described his symphony as "vividly orchestrated, possesses tremendous emotional intensity, and yet is succinct and skillful in its control of form". In 1982 Ludwig's symphony Age of Victory was premiered at the Inter-American Music Festival at the Kennedy Center in Washington, D.C. and was referred to as "Ludwig's Eloquent 'Victory'" by The Washington Post. The same symphony was performed again later that year as part of the Kennedy Center Friedheim Competition, the performance was broadcast over NPR and Voice of America.

Ludwig conducts Ludwig Symphony

Ludwig's music ranges from chamber music to large orchestral works including symphony, chorus, and soloists. His second symphony premiered in Mexico City with the Orquesta Filarmónica de la UNAM led by Maestro Jorge Velazco. Ludwig's String Symphony was premiered in Florence, Italy and was broadcast on Rome TV and his Four Lyric Songs for mezzo-soprano was premiered by the Orquesta Sinfonica de Mineria in Mexico City and broadcast live in Central and South America on Grupo Radio Centro. Ludwig's Violin Concerto premiered in Miami by the University of Miami with violinist Mark Peskanov and conductor Thomas Sleeper. The Miami Sun-Sentinel called it "strikingly passionate, lush, and lyrical".

== Selected works ==
=== Symphonic ===
- Symphony No. 1 (1982)
- Symphony No. 2 (1989)
- Symphony No. 3 (2009)
- Symphony No. 4 for chorus and soloists (2015)
- Symphony No. 5 (2016)
- Overture Fantasie for orchestra (1986)
- Violin Concerto for violin and orchestra (1994)
- Four Songs for mezzo-soprano and orchestra (1998)
- Piano Concerto for piano and orchestra (2007)
- Adagietto for orchestra (2010)
- An Angel Awaits for soprano and orchestra (2015)
- The Loneliness is Lifted for tenor solo, orchestra, and chorus (2015)
- I'm a Ballet Girl for three dancers, actress, and orchestra (2015)

=== Chamber music ===
- Woodwind Quintet Two Divertissements (1985)
- String Quartet No. 1 (1985)
- Sinfonia No. 1 for chamber orchestra (1987)
- Pecume for bass vocalist and various instruments (1986)
- Song for Nicholas for violin and piano (1990)
- Piano Quartet (1996)
- String Symphony Four Divertissements (2000)
- Concerto for Piano and Strings (2005)

=== Transcriptions ===
- Ashkelone Suite for orchestra (1999)
- Offenbach introduction and bolero for cello and orchestra (2000)
- Sarasate Zapateado for violin and orchestra (2002)
- Fred and Ginger ballet suite for orchestra (2004)
- Beethoven Waldstein for strings and chorus (2015)

== Awards ==
- Third place winner of the Kennedy Center Friedheim Award for instrumental music composition, 1982
- Indiana State University Contemporary Music Festival Composers Competition Winner, 1986
