= Claudio Spies =

American composer (1925–2020)

- Born: March 26, 1925; Santiago, Chile
- Died: April 2, 2020 (aged 95); Sonoma, California
- Occupations: composer, teacher
- Years active: 1953–2020

Carlos Claudio Spies (March 26, 1925 – April 2, 2020) was a Chilean American composer.

== Biography ==
=== Early life ===
Born in Santiago, Chile, of German Jewish parents, Spies completed primary and secondary education in Santiago in 1941, when he passed the Bachillerato. Erich Kleiber and Fritz Busch were mentors to Spies at an early age.

Spies came to the United States in August 1942 to study music at New England Conservatory and Longy School of Music, where he studied with Nadia Boulanger and, after her departure for California, with Harold Shapero. He entered Harvard College in February 1947. One of his most influential teachers at Harvard was Irving Fine, and another was Otto Gombosi. He wrote his dissertation on "The concept of form in the symphonies and concertos of Strawinsky."

He graduated in June 1950, and received the John K. Paine Traveling Fellowship, which took him to Paris, where he spent a year composing. He returned to Harvard as a graduate student and received his MA degree in composition in 1954.

=== Career ===
Spies has taught music at many institutions:

- Harvard University (1953–1957)
- Vassar College (1957–1958)
- Swarthmore College (1958–1970)
- Princeton University (Professor of Music, 1970–1998; Professor Emeritus, 1998–)
- The Juilliard School (1998–2010)

In addition to teaching music composition and analysis, he has also taught such subjects as: study of composers' manuscripts, Brahms' chamber music, courses on the music of Igor Stravinsky and Arnold Schoenberg, conducting. He may be the first person to teach a course on composers' manuscripts, which he did through facsimile editions as well as regular visits to manuscripts collection at the Morgan Library in New York City.

With Stravinsky, he attended countless rehearsals, performances, and recording sessions of new Stravinsky works in such places as Boston, New York, and Venice (the first performance of The Rake's Progress in 1951). Another Stravinsky work whose premiere Spies helped bring to fruition was Requiem Canticles, at Princeton's McCarter Theatre in 1966.

While teaching at Harvard Summer School in 1968, Spies conducted the first performances of four preliminary versions of Stravinsky's Les Noces along with a performance of the final version. At that session, he also conducted various works of Schoenberg and Anton Webern. Some of the musical comments shared between Spies and Stravinsky were reflected in articles written by Spies in several issues of Perspectives of New Music dealing with new works by Stravinsky.

== Personal life ==
Spies married Emmi-Vera Tobias in 1953 and had five children: Caterina, Michael, Tatiana, Leah, Susanna. He has five grandchildren. Spies and his wife were divorced in 1985. Spies moved to California from his Princeton home to live with his daughter.

He died April 2, 2020, in Sonoma.

== Sources ==
- Sadie, Stanley, The Norton/Grove Concise Dictionary of Music, W. W. Norton, 1988
