= Arthur Berger (composer) =

American composer and music critic (1912-2003)

Arthur Victor Berger (May 15, 1912 – October 7, 2003) was an American composer and music critic who has been described as a New Mannerist.

== Biography ==
Born in New York City, of Jewish descent, Berger studied as an undergraduate at New York University graduating in 1934, during which time he joined the Young Composer's Group, as a graduate student under Walter Piston at Harvard, and with Nadia Boulanger and at the Sorbonne under a Paine Fellowship.

He taught briefly at Mills College and Brooklyn College, then worked briefly at the New York Sun and then for a longer period of time at the New York Herald Tribune. In 1953 he left the paper to teach at Brandeis University where he was eventually named the Irving Fine Professor Emeritus. His notable students there included Gustav Ciamaga and Richard Wernick. He taught occasionally at the New England Conservatory during his retirement.

He co-founded (with Benjamin Boretz), in 1962, Perspectives of New Music, which he edited until 1964. He was elected a Fellow of the American Academy of Arts and Sciences in 1971. He wrote the first book on Aaron Copland (reprinted 1990, Da Capo Press), and coined the terms octatonic scale and pitch centricity in his "Problems of Pitch Organization in Stravinsky". He died in Boston, Massachusetts, age 91.

== Works ==
His works show a preoccupation with vertical and horizontal musical space (see pitch space). His musical influences include Igor Stravinsky, Arnold Schoenberg, and later Anton Webern. In the forties he composed neoclassical works including Serenade Concertante (1944) and Three Pieces for Strings (1945), and embraced the twelve-tone technique in the 1950s. His later works moved away from serialism but continued to use tone cluster 'cells' whose pitch classes are displaced by octaves. George Perle has described his "keen and sophisticated musical intellect" and praised "his serial music [for being] as far removed from current fashionable trends as his diatonic music was a few years ago."

Perle further praises his String Quartet: "in the quartet, as in Berger's earlier works, and in most of the great music of our Western heritage, timbre, texture, dynamics, rhythm, and form are elements of a musical language whose syntax and grammar are essentially derived from pitch relations. If these elements never seem specious and arbitrary, as they do with so many of the dodecaphonic productions that deluge us today from both the left and right, it is precisely because of the authenticity and integrity of his musical thinking at this basic level."

His works include Ideas of Order, Polyphony, Quartet for Winds, described by Thomson as "one of the most satisfactory pieces for winds in the whole modern repertory", String Quartet (1958), Five Pieces for Piano (1969) and Septet (1965–66). He was a fellow of the American Academy of Arts and Letters and the American Academy of Arts and Sciences.

Berger is grouped in the "Boston school" along with Lukas Foss, Irving Fine, Alexei Haieff, Harold Shapero, and Claudio Spies.
