= Derek Healey =

British composer and organist

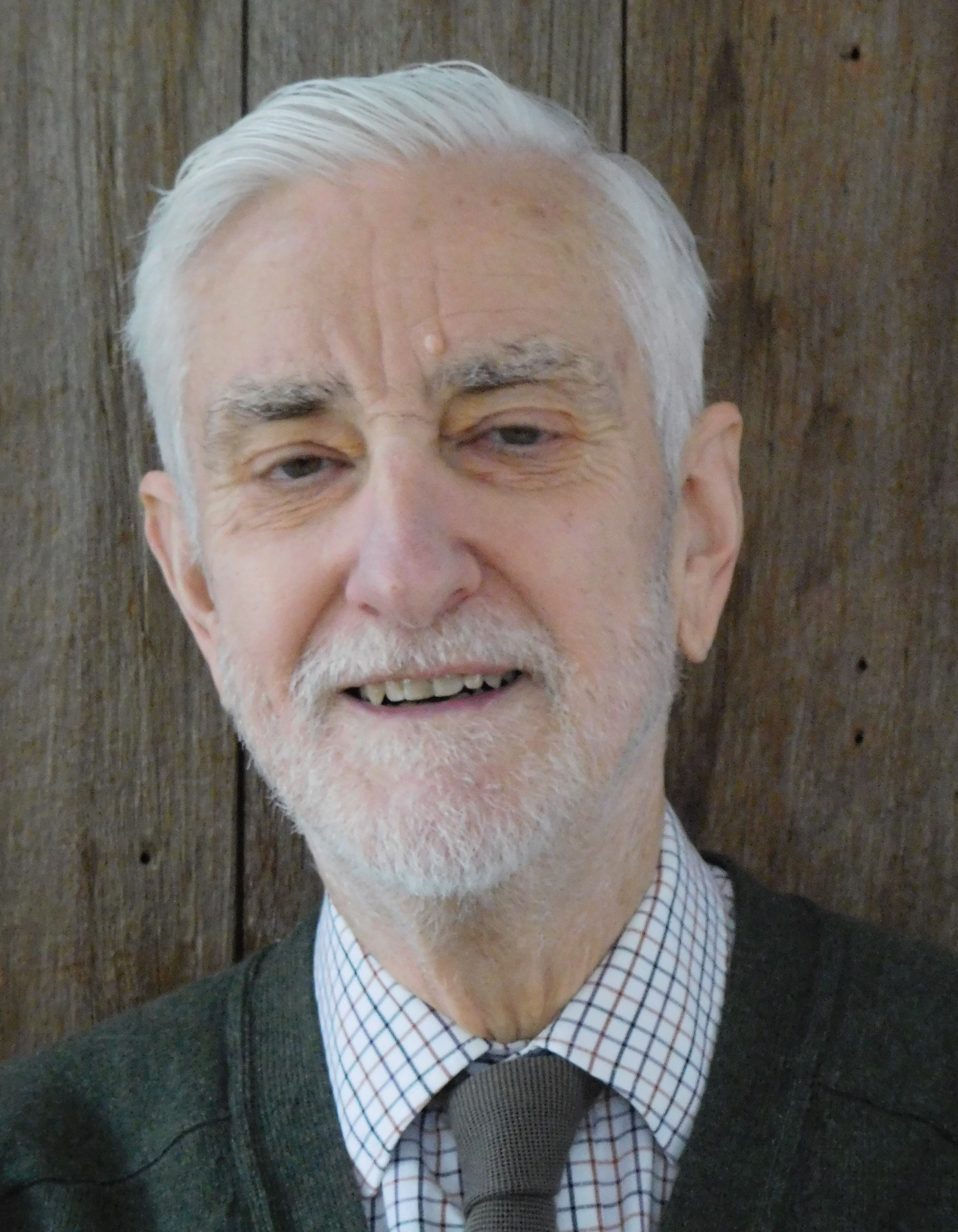
- Derek Healey 2017

Background information
- Born: May 2, 1936 (age 90); Wargrave, England
- Genres: Classical
- Occupations: Composer, teacher
- Instrument: organ
- Website: derekhealey.com

Derek Edward Healey (born 2 May 1936) is an English composer whose compositions include an opera, a Requiem, orchestral, chamber, choral and organ works. Music is published in the UK, USA, Canada and Germany.

== Life and career ==
Healey was born in Wargrave, England and studied composition under Herbert Howells and organ under Harold Darke at the Royal College of Music, London from 1952 to 1956. He received his Bachelor of Music degree from the University of Durham in 1961, followed by four years of further study at the graduate summer school of the Accademia Musicale Chigiana, Siena (1961-1963, 1966) with Vito Frazzi, Francesco Lavagnino, and Goffredo Petrassi; and in 1962-1963 studied privately with Boris Porena in Rome.

In 1969, he moved to Canada and lived there for the next nine years. He completed his Doctor of Music at the University of Toronto in 1974 and also taught there as well as the University of Victoria, the Waterloo Lutheran University, and the University of Guelph before joining the music faculty of the University of Oregon in 1978. Healey returned to England in 1988 when he became academic professor of music at the RAF School of Music. He retired from teaching in 1996 and settled in Brooklyn, New York but has continued to actively compose, particularly for wind ensemble, saxophone octet, solo voice, choir and organ.

== Selected works ==
=== Stage ===
- Seabird Island: an opera in two acts (6 singers, chamber orchestra and pre-recorded tape) - op. 46, (1977)

=== Orchestra ===
- Concerto for organ, strings and timpani, op. 8, (1960)
- Variations on “Three Gypsies” (organ, strings and percussion), op. 22 (1965/79)
- Arctic Images, op. 40, (1971)
- Primrose in Paradise, op. 45, (1975)
- Tribulation and The Morning Trumpet, op. 53, (1978)
- Gabriola (a West Coast Canadian Set), op. 70, (1988)
- Salal (an Idyll), op. 71, (1990)

=== Band/Wind Ensemble ===
- Symphony II “Mountain Music” (large wind ensemble with percussion), op. 66, (1985)
- Triptych (wind band) - op. 73, (1990)
- One Midsummer Morning (large wind ensemble), op. 82, (1997)
- Latino Preludes (wind band), op. 89h, (2003)
- Solemn Music (wind band), op. 93, (2003)
- English Dances (wind ensemble), op. 95, (1987 & 2004)
- Owl and Pale Maidens (wind ensemble), op. 132, (2012)
- HUNTER: a homage to Robert Flaherty (wind ensemble), op. 134, (2013)
- Songs from the “Shih Ching” (2 sets of songs for lyric soprano and wind ensemble), op. 150, (2016)
- Nova: 12 Variations on a Scotian Song (wind ensemble), op. 159, (2019)

=== Chamber ===
- Six Epigrams (violin and piano), op. 21, (1963)
- Sonata for ‘cello and piano, op. 12, (1961)
- Laudes (flute and chamber ensemble), op. 26, (1966)
- Maschere (violin and piano), op. 29, (1969)
- From the West (solo viola and opt. piano), op. 72, (1990)
- Toccata per L’Elevazione (saxophone octet), op. 112, (2007)
- Tokkata: a homage to Buxtehude (saxophone octet), op. 138, (2014)
- Restoration: a homage to Purcell (saxophone octet), op. 148, (2015)
- Sonatina for Four (recorder quartet), op. 149, (2016)
- Weihnachten '16 (soprano saxophone and organ), op. 153, (2017)
- Souvenirs of Frankfurt (alto saxophone and piano), op. 160, (2020)
- Sonata (soprano saxophone and harp), op. 161, (2020)
- Souvenirs of Berlin, books 1 & 2 (alto saxophone and piano), op. 162/3, (2021)

=== Solo Voice ===
- Six Greek Fragments (soprano and piano), op. 11, (1961)
- Six Irish Songs (soprano and piano), op. 16, (1962)
- Butterflies (mezzo-soprano and large instrumental ensemble), op. 36, (1970)
- Five Edward Thomas Songs (mezzo-soprano, or soprano and piano), op. 97, (2005)
- The Silvered Lute (soprano and piano), op. 107, (2006)
- The Coast of Oregon (mezzo-soprano and small instrumental ensemble), op. 128, (2011)
- Morgensternlieder (contralto, alto saxophone and piano), op. 129, (2011)
- Seascapes and Shanties (contralto and piano), op. 135 (2013)
- Heinelieder (mezzo-soprano and piano), op. 137, (2014)
- Bianco’s Delight (soprano and piano), op. 146, (2015)

=== Choir – Sacred ===
- Praise the Lord, O my Soul (a cantata for choir, soloists, recorder quartet and harpsichord), op. 7, (1960 & ’79)
- The Shepherd Boy's Song (an anthem for TrATB choir and organ), op. misc. (1965)
- Discendi, amor santo (soprano solo, choir and organ), op. 28, (1967)
- A Maiden Mild (a carol for choir and harp), op. misc., (1986/97)
- The God Whom Earth and Sea and Sky (an anthem for soprano solo, SSAA choir, and organ), op. misc. (1997)
- God Be in My Head (an anthem for SA treble choir and organ), op. misc. (1998)
- The White Dove (an anthem for two solo sopranos, choir and organ), op. misc. (2003)
- O Blessed Queen of Mercy (an anthem for SSA choir and organ), op. misc. (2005)
- The Lowly Child (an anthem for solo soprano, SSA choir, and organ), op. misc. (2005)
- For all Thy Saints, O Lord (an anthem for SA(t)B and organ), op. misc. (2007)
- Rejoice, the Glorious Day Is Come (an anthem for solo soprano, SSA choir, and harp or piano), op. misc. (2007)
- Mass for San Corrado (baritone solo, choir, flute, saxophone octet, percussion and organ), op. 116, (2009)
- The Garden (an anthem for choir and organ), op. misc., (2009)
- Missa Brevis: Santa Cecilia (choir and optional organ), op. 130, (2011)
- A Posy for the Christ Child (6 carols for choir and harp), op. 140, (2014)
- Magnificat and Nunc Dimittis for Canterbury (choir and small orchestra), op. 151/2, (2017)
- Magnificat for St. Martins (choir and instrumental ensemble), op. 158, (2019)
- Requiem (soprano, choir and orchestra), op. 145, (2021)
- Motets (choir, soprano saxophone and organ), op. 164, (2022)

=== Choir – Secular ===
- Six Canadian Folk Songs (choir and optional piano), op. 41, (1973)
- In Flanders Fields (soprano solo, SATB and alto recorder or equivalent instrument), op. misc (1974/76)
- The Brown Season (choir, flute and percussion), op. 48, (1978)
- Six Canadian Folk Songs, set II (choir and optional piano), op.86, (1998)

=== Organ ===
- Three Voluntaries, op. 1a, b & c, (1956/7)
- Three Voluntaries, op. 15, b & c, (1962/3)
- Sonata for organ, op.10, (1961)
- Variants, op. 23, (1964)
- Festus, op. 32, (1968)
- Sonata II, op. 92, (1992)
- Sonata III, op. 80, (1996)
- From the Gaelic: 10 Preludes on Irish Melodies, op. 81 (1996),
- Seven Preludes on Latino Religious Songs op. 89a, b, and c, (1999)
- Sonata for Virginia (violin and organ), op. 94, (2003)
- Northern Landscapes (soprano saxophone and organ), op. 102 (2006)
- Choralvorspiel (52 Chorale Preludes), op. 154 (2018)

=== Piano ===
- Twelve Preludes, op. 6, (1960)
- Cityscape with Bells (Gedachniskirche), op. 142, (2015)
- Bagatelles Bk I, op. 144, (2015)

=== Electronic ===
- Night Thoughts (background music to a radio play, for pre-recorded tape), op. 39, (1970)
- Lieber Robert (piano with pre-recorded tape), op. 43, (1975)
- Summer ‘73/Ontario, (organ with pre-recorded tape), op. 44, (1975)
- Wood (soprano or shackuhachi and 4 synthesizers), op. 51, (1978)
