= Bernard Reichel =

Swiss musician (1901–1992)

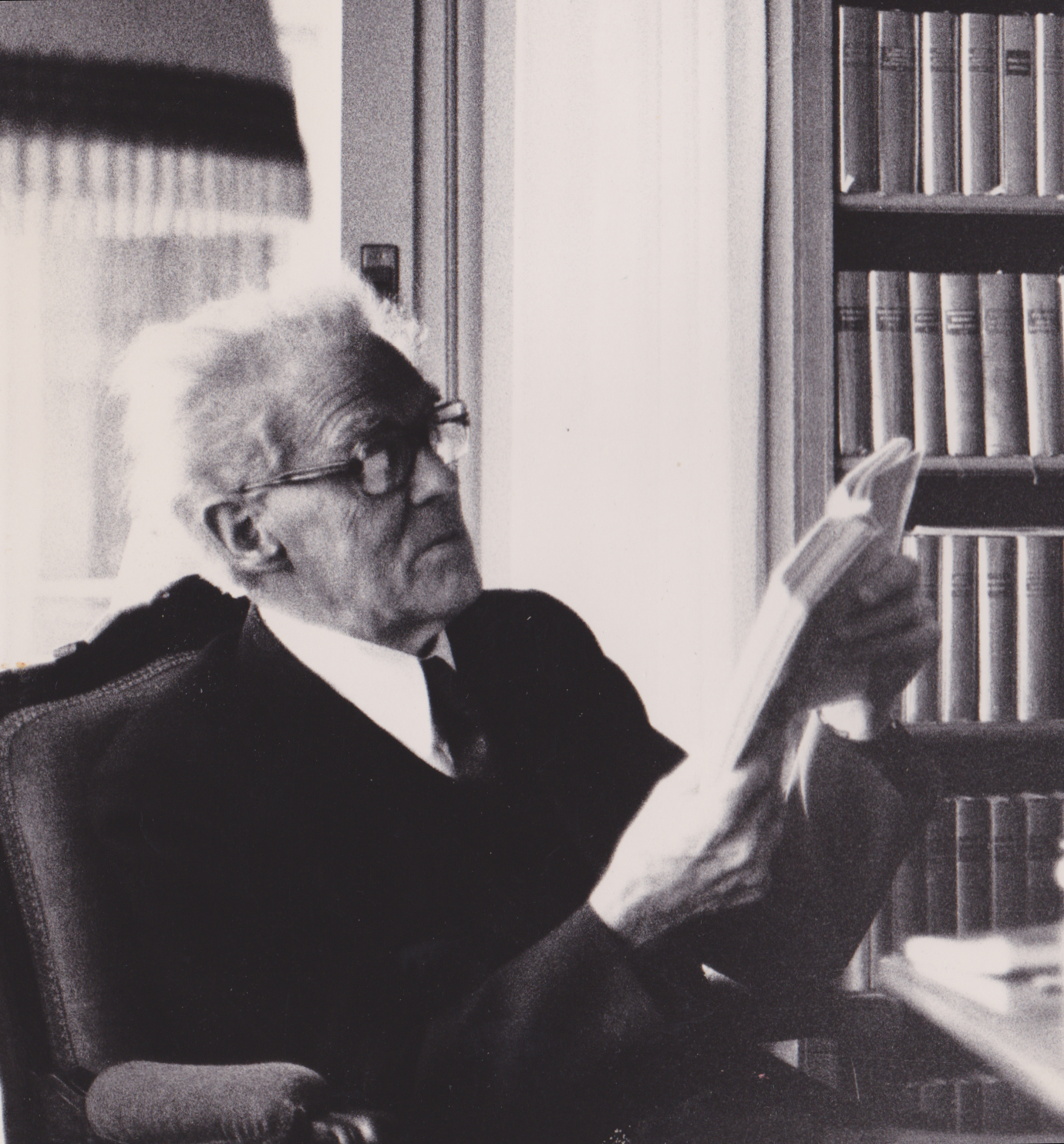
Bernard Reichel

Bernard Reichel (August 3, 1901 – December 10, 1992) was a 20th-century classical composer from the French-speaking part of Switzerland.

Born in Montmirail (now part Laténa, Canton of Neuchâtel), he settled in Geneva in his twenties. He spent most of his life there, writing a great deal of music, mostly sacred, and working as a music educator. He taught harmony at the Geneva Conservatory for twenty years, and various classes at the Dalcroze institute for 53 years. He was also an organist, serving at the Protestant churches of Chêne-Bougeries and Eaux-Vives, two downtown parishes in Geneva.

His musical language is militantly tonal considering the time in which he wrote and taught, and informed by folk music and medieval modes in a way reminiscent of Ralph Vaughan Williams. His work is little-known outside of Switzerland, overshadowed by that of his contemporaries, Frank Martin and Arthur Honegger.

He died in 1992, in Lutry, in the canton of Vaud.
