= Peter Jona Korn =

German composer

Peter Jona Korn (30 March 1922 – 12 January 1998) was a German composer, music educator, conductor, pianist, harpsichord player and writer. He was a son of the Jewish couple Georg Korn, an amateur pianist, and Elisabeth, born Heilborn, a violinist and singer.

== Life ==
=== Youth and education ===
Born in Berlin, Korn developed his musical talent in his early years. At the age of ten he worked as a pianist and harpsichord player in the programmes of the broadcasting company "Deutsche Welle" and performed as a soprano soloist at concerts in the Berliner Philharmonie. For parties in his school, he already composed simple works. In 1932, he studied composition in an experimental special class at the University of the Arts in Berlin. For a short time he studied privately with Guido Waldmann. In 1933, he emigrated to the United Kingdom and continued his composition studies with Edmund Rubbra in London from 1934 to 1936. In 1936 he emigrated to the then still British Mandatory Palestine. From 1936 to 1938, he studied with Stefan Wolpe at the Palestine Conservatory in Jerusalem. At that time, compositions by the sixteen-year-old Korn were already broadcast. In 1939 he studied with Hermann Scherchen in Tel Aviv. In 1940, he emigrated to the United States where he studied from 1941 to 1942 with Arnold Schoenberg at the University of California - Los Angeles (UCLA). He completed his studies from 1946 to 1947 with Ernst Toch, Hanns Eisler and Miklós Rózsa at the University of Southern California in Los Angeles.

=== Conductor ===
In 1947 he founded the New Orchestra of Los Angeles and became their conductor until 1956. With this orchestra he gave the first performance of Bruckner' Symphony No. 6 in its original version in the United States in 1955. In 1951, he married the pianist Barbara Sheldon.

=== Music educator ===
In 1957 he returned to Europe and worked as a guest conductor with well-known orchestras and as a guest lecturer. In 1960 he succeeded Wilhelm Killmayer as a composition teacher at the Richard Strauss Conservatory. He worked in this function until 1961. In 1964 and 1965, he was a guest lecturer at the University of California - Los Angeles (UCLA). He returned to Europe and lived for a short time in Switzerland. In 1965 he returned to Germany and in 1967 became director of the University of Music and Performing Arts Munich in Munich.

=== Composer ===
In addition to his work as a conductor, music pedagogue and writer, his work as a composer was usually central. He wrote works for orchestra, wind orchestra, an opera, vocal music and chamber music. In 1968 he received the music prize from the city of Munich and in 1984 he was awarded the Bavarian Order of Merit.

=== Other activities ===
He also worked as a music critic for various music magazines and newspapers. He was a member of the supervisory board of the German copyright society (Gesellschaft für musikalische Aufführungs- und mechanische Vervielfältigungsrechte, briefly GEMA), which appointed him an honorary member in 1992. He was also a member of the television board of the ZDF. Korn was co-founder and second chairman of the Richard-Strauss-Gesellschaft e.V. He was chairman of the federation of composers from Munich (Verbandes Münchner Tonkünstler), second chairman of the German Composers' Federation (Deutscher Komponistenverband) and second chairman of the Orff-Schulwerk Gesellschaft. Korn is author of the booklet: Musikalische Umweltverschmutzungen - Polemische Variationen über ein unerquickliches Thema.

== Publications ==
- Apropos "Zwangsjacke ..." An analysis of the attack tactics against Alois Melichar (on the occasion of the 2nd edition of Melichar, music in the straightjacket), Wancura, 1960. 33 p.
- Rufmord für Anfänger. Der "Fall Egk": Die andere Seite...oder: Wer nicht emigrierte, klagt sich an..., in Publik, 16 May 1969
- Musikalische Umweltverschmutzungen - Polemische Variationen über ein unerquickliches Thema, 3rd edition, Wiesbaden: Breitkopf & Härtel, 1975, 1981. 80 p. ISBN 3-7651-0085-4
- The Symphony in America, Chapter 32 of The Symphony (ed. Robert Simpson), 2nd edition, Pelican 1965
