= Claude Baker =

American composer (born 1948)

W. Claude Baker Jr. (born April 12, 1948 Lenoir, North Carolina) is an American composer of contemporary classical music.

== Biography ==
Claude Baker attained a B.M. degree, magna cum laude, from East Carolina University in 1970. He subsequently studied composition at the Eastman School of Music with Samuel Adler and Warren Benson, and holds M.M. (1973) and D.M.A. (1975) degrees from that institution.

He is currently Class of 1956 Chancellor's Professor Emeritus of Composition in the Jacobs School of Music at Indiana University, Bloomington, where he is also the recipient of the university-wide Tracy M. Sonneborn Award for accomplishments in the areas of teaching and research. Before his appointment at Indiana, he served on the faculties of the University of Georgia and the University of Louisville, and was a visiting professor at the Eastman School of Music. In the eight-year period from 1991 to 1999, he held the position of Composer-in-Residence of the St. Louis Symphony, one of the longest such residencies with any major orchestra in the country. During this time, he initiated numerous community-based projects, the most notable of which was the establishment of composition programs at multiple grade levels in the St. Louis Public Schools. In recognition of his contributions to the cultural life of the city, he was awarded an honorary degree by the University of Missouri-St. Louis in 1999.

His music has been championed by such conductors as Leonard Slatkin, Mario Venzago, Robert Spano, Gerhardt Zimmermann, Gilbert Varga, Juanjo Mena, and Giancarlo Guerrero, and by soloists including Marc-André Hamelin, Eugene Rousseau, Claire Huangci, Tzimon Barto, Jon Garrison, and Ana Higueras. Among the many orchestras in addition to St. Louis that have commissioned and/or performed his music are those of San Francisco, Atlanta, Pittsburgh, Detroit, Indianapolis, and Nashville, as well as the New York Philharmonic, National Symphony Orchestra, Orquesta Nacional de España, Musikkollegium Winterthur, Staatskapelle Halle, Orchestre National de Lyon, and Das Berner Symphonieorchester. Performances of his chamber works have been presented by Alarm Will Sound, Cleveland Chamber Symphony, Voices of Change, American Modern Ensemble, Left Coast Chamber Ensemble, Empyrean Ensemble, Locrian Chamber Players, Ensemble Connect, Momenta String Quartet, and the Pacifica String Quartet (with pianist Ursula Oppens). His music is published by Keiser Southern and Carl Fischer, and is recorded on the Naxos, Innova, ACA, Jeanné, IUMusic, TNC, Gasparo, and Louisville First Edition labels.

== Accolades ==
The professional honors he has received as a composer include an Academy Award in Music from the American Academy of Arts and Letters; two Kennedy Center Friedheim Awards; a "Manuel de Falla" Prize from the Government of Spain; the Pogorzelski-Yankee Prize from the American Guild of Organists; the Eastman-Leonard and George Eastman Prizes; awards from ASCAP, BMI, and the League of Composers/ISCM; commissions from the Koussevitzky Music Foundation, Fromm Music Foundation, Barlow Endowment for Music Composition, and Meet the Composer (now, New Music USA); a Paul Fromm Residency at the American Academy in Rome; a Copland House Residency Award; and fellowships from the John Simon Guggenheim Memorial Foundation, National Endowment for the Arts, Rockefeller Foundation, Bogliasco Foundation, and the state arts councils of Indiana, Kentucky, and New York. In 2021, he was named as the recipient of the A. I. duPont Composer's Award from the Delaware Symphony Orchestra for his “significant contribution to the field of contemporary classical music.”
