= Carl Faia =

American composer and musician

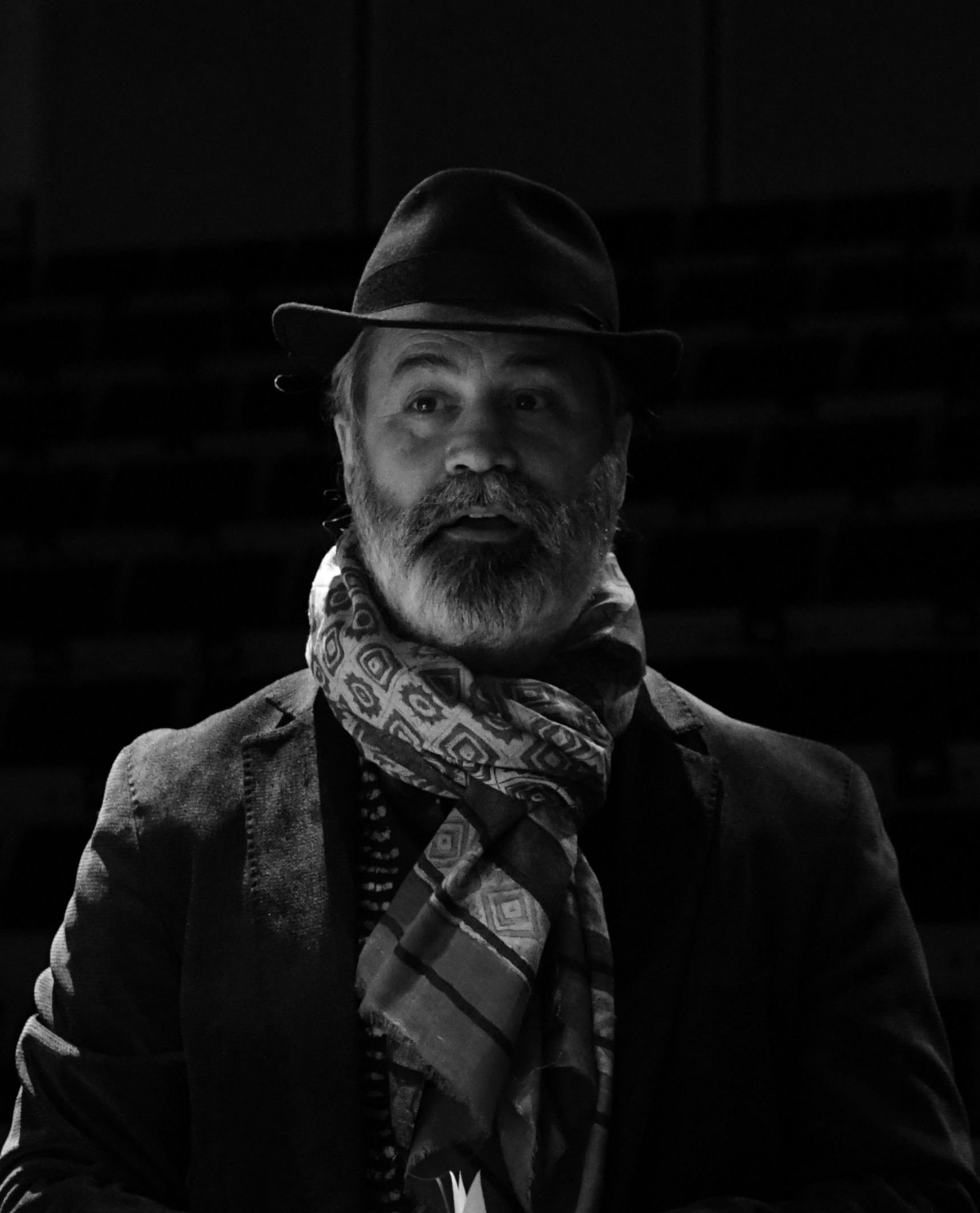
Carl Faia, 2019

Carl Faia (born 1962 at Tinker Air Force Base in Oklahoma) is an American composer and live electronics designer and performer.

Faia studied composition at the University of California, Santa Barbara, Florida State University and the Royal Danish Academy of Music on a Fulbright grant. Some of his past teachers include Edward Applebaum, Peter Racine Fricker, Per Nørgård and Karl Aage Rasmussen. Later, he participated in masterclasses with Tristan Murail, Philippe Manoury and Harrison Birtwistle.

Since 1995 he has been active as a live electronics designer working at IRCAM in Paris, at the CIRM in Nice where he has also been studio manager and a freelancer. He has collaborated with numerous composers including James Dillon, Jonathan Harvey, Harrison Birtwistle, Fausto Romitelli, Luca Francesconi, Alejandro Viñao, Philippe Leroux, as well as the National Jazz Orchestra of France. He has collaborated with artists to present new works with computer electronics in various festivals throughout Europe including Ars Musica (Brussels), Holland Festival (Amsterdam), Musica (Strasbourg), Agora (Paris), Gaida (Vilnius), MaerzMusik (Berlin), Lille 2004 as well as the Casa da Música (Porto, Spain) and Lille 2004 and Queen Elizabeth Hall (London). With (MaxMSP) he ported several pieces from the analog world to the digital, including Luigi Nono's Pour Pierre and Karlheinz Stockhausen's Solo. He has also performed with computers, Theremin, various sensors and guitar with Art Zoyd and Thomas Köner.

He has worked regularly with Studio Art Zoyd (France) and the Forum Neues Musiktheater der Staatsoper Stuttgart (Germany) as a live electronics designer with invited composers for music theatre, opera, concerts and multimedia projects.

In 2002, he founded the non-profit association, Lieu, based in Nice, France, to promote the creation and diffusion of contemporary music using technology. Lieu has realized several projects in the development of new tools for sound creation and has been present in the production of new works using technology.

As a teacher he has worked since 2005 with André Serre-Milan in the studios of Art Zoyd to develop a unique pedagogical approach to electroacoustic composition culminating each year in the multimedia spectacle Sonoscopie. Since 2009 he is also a Lecturer in Sonic Arts at Brunel University London.
