= Permafrost (album) =

Studio album by Thomas Köner
- Released: 1993
- Genre: Ambient
- Length: 37:45
- Label: Barooni
- Producer: Thomas Köner

Thomas Köner chronology
Teimo (1992)	Permafrost (1993)	Aubrite (1995)

Professional ratings
Review scores
Source	Rating
Allmusic	3/5 stars

Permafrost is the third solo album from German ambient music producer, Thomas Köner. Considered by many as his greatest work, he further develops the icy drone style of previous works, making its climax in the title track. In 1996, the album was re-issued by Mille Plateaux along with his previous album, Teimo, on one disc.

== Track listing ==
1. "Nival" – 5:57
2. "Serac" – 5:38
3. "Firn" – 5:34
4. "Permafrost" – 10:09
5. "Meta Incognita" - 7:03
6. "…" - 3:24

=== Notes ===
Nival is a synonym for snowy.

A serac is a group or column of ice intersecting crevasses on a glacier.

Firn is a type of snow that has been left over from past seasons and has been recrystallized into a substance denser than névé. It is at an intermediate stage between snow and glacial ice.

Permafrost is soil at or below the freezing point of water (0 °C or 32 °F) for two or more years. In practice it is a large stretch of land (found mostly in Siberia) with soil frozen all over deep to the bottom.

"Meta incognita" means "unknown frontier" in Latin. It's also another name for Baffin Island.
