= Irving Fine =

American composer (1914–1962)

Irving Gifford Fine (December 3, 1914 – August 23, 1962) was an American composer. Fine's work assimilated neoclassical, romantic, and serial elements. Composer Virgil Thomson described Fine's "unusual melodic grace" while Aaron Copland noted the "elegance, style, finish and...convincing continuity" of Fine's music.

Fine was a member of a close-knit group of Boston composers in the mid-20th century who were sometimes called the "Boston School." Other members of the Boston School included Arthur Berger, Leonard Bernstein, Aaron Copland, Lukas Foss, and Harold Shapero.

== Life ==
Fine was born in Boston, Massachusetts, where he studied piano, and received both bachelor's and master's degrees from Harvard University, where he was a pupil of Walter Piston. Fine was a conducting pupil of Serge Koussevitzky, served as pianist for the Boston Symphony Orchestra, and studied composition with Nadia Boulanger at the Fontainebleau School of Music in Paris and at Radcliffe College. From 1939 until 1950, he taught music theory at Harvard and conducted its Glee Club, becoming a close associate of Leonard Bernstein, Igor Stravinsky and Aaron Copland. From 1950, he taught at Brandeis University, where he was Walter S. Naumburg Professor of Music and founded the School of Creative Arts. Between 1946 and 1957, he also taught composition at the Tanglewood Music Festival in the Berkshires.

Irving Fine died in Natick, Massachusetts in August 1962. He was 47 years of age. The cause of death was heart disease.

== Educational legacy ==
Notable composition students of Irving Fine include Gustav Ciamaga, Noël Lee, Ann Loomis Silsbee, Halim El-Dabh, and Richard Wernick. Towards the end of his life, Fine notably collaborated with Wernick on the musical Maggie, a work based on the Stephen Crane novel of the same name. A Professorship of Music at Brandeis University is named in Fine's honor. The composer Arthur Berger served as Irving G. Fine Professor of Music from 1969 to 1980 (and as Emeritus Professor until his death in 2003). The current Irving G. Fine Professor of Music is Eric Chasalow.

Brandeis University is also home to the Irving Fine Society, founded in 2006 by music director Nicholas Alexander Brown. The society comprises the Irving Fine Singers and the Gifford 5, a woodwind quintet. The society "acts as a producing organization for concerts, educational programs and scholarly activities related to the legacy of composer Irving Gifford Fine and the global impact of American culture in the twentieth century."

== Works ==
=== Orchestra ===
- Toccata concertante, 1947
- Serious Song: A Lament, strings, 1955
- Blue Towers, 1959
- Diversions, 1959–60
- Symphony, 1962

=== Chorus ===
- Three Choruses from Alice in Wonderland, 3–4 voices, piano, 1942; arrangement with orchestra, 1949
- The Choral New Yorker, S, A, Bar, 3–4 voices, piano, 1944
- A Short Alleluia, SSA, 1945
- In gratio jubilo, hymn, small orchestra, 1949
- The Hour-Glass (B. Jonson), song cycle, SATB, 1949
- Old American Songs (trad.), 2–4 voices, piano, 1952
- An Old Song (Yehoash, trans. M. Syrkin), SATB, 1953
- Three Choruses from Alice in Wonderland (L. Carroll), 2nd ser., SSA, piano, 1953
- McCord's Menagerie (McCord), TTB, 1957

=== Songs ===
- Mutability (I. Orgel), cycle, Mez, piano, 1952
- Childhood Fables for Grown-ups (G. Norman), Mez/Bar, piano/orchestra, 1954–5

=== Chamber and solo instrument ===
- Sonata, violin, piano, 1946
- Music for Piano, 1947
- Partita, wind quintet, 1948
- Notturno, strings, harp, 1950–51
- String Quartet, 1952
- Children's Piano Pieces, 1956
- Fantasia, string trio, 1956
- Hommage à Mozart, piano, 1956
- Romanza, wind quintet, 1958

== Reading ==
A biography, Irving Fine: An American Composer in His Time, by author, composer, and pianist Phillip Ramey, was published in 2005 by the Library of Congress and Pendragon Press, and received the 2006 Nicolas Slonimsky Award for Outstanding Musical Biography from ASCAP.
