= Robert Sanders (composer) =

American composer

- Born: July 2, 1906; Chicago, Illinois, United States
- Died: December 26, 1974 (aged 68); Delray Beach, Florida, United States
- Occupation: Composer

Robert Sanders (July 2, 1906 – December 26, 1974) was an American composer. His work was part of the music event in the art competition at the 1936 Summer Olympics.
