= Alexei Haieff =

American composer

- Born: August 25, 1914; Blagoveshchensk, Russia
- Died: March 1, 1994; Rome, Italy
- Era: Neoclassical

Alexei Vasilievich Haieff (August 25, 1914 – March 1, 1994) was an American composer of orchestral and choral works. He is known for following Stravinsky's neoclassicism, observing an austere economy of means, and achieving modernistic effects by a display of rhythmic agitation, often with jazzy undertones.

== Background ==
Born in Blagoveshchensk, in the Russian Far East, Haieff received his primary education at Harbin, Manchuria. In 1931 he went to the U.S., where he studied with Rubin Goldmark and Frederick Jacobi at the Juilliard School of Music in New York City (1934–38). In 1938-39 he also studied with Nadia Boulanger in Paris and in Cambridge, Massachusetts. He became a U.S. citizen and held U.S. citizenship for 55 years, until his death.

He held a Guggenheim Fellowship in 1946 and again in 1949, and was a Fellow at the American Academy in Rome (1947–48). His Divertimento (1944) was choreographed by George Balanchine in 1947. He won the Rome Prize in 1949. He was a visiting composition and music theory professor at Carnegie Institute of Technology for the 1962-63 School year.

He was a professor at the University at Buffalo (1962–68), and composer-in-residence at the University of Utah (1968–70). His Piano Concerto won the New York Music Critics' Circle Award (1952) and his 2nd Symphony the American International Music Fund Award (1957).

Haieff's notable students include Paul Ramsier.

He was married to Sheila Jeanne Agatha van Meurs in 1988. He died in Rome, Italy, at the age of 79.

== List of works ==
Ballets

- The Princess Zondilda and Her Entourage (1946)
- Beauty and the Beast (1947)

Orchestral

- Symphony No. 1 (1942)
- Symphony No. 2 (Boston, April 11, 1958)
- Symphony No. 3 (New Haven, Conn., April 11, 1961)
- Divertimento (N.Y., April 5, 1946)
- Violin Concerto (1948)
- Piano Concerto (N.Y., April 27, 1952)
- Ballet in E (1955)
- Éloge for Chamber Orch. (1967)

Chamber music

- Sonatina for String Quartet (1937)
- 3 Bagatelles for Oboe and Bassoon (1939)
- Serenade for Oboe, Clarinet, Bassoon, and Piano (1942)
- Eclogue for Cello and Piano (1947)
- String Quartet (1951)
- La Nouvelle Héloïse for Harp and String Quartet (1963)
- Cello Sonata (1963)
- Rhapsodies for Guitar and Harpsichord (1980)
- Wind Quintet (1983)

Piano Compositions

- Sonata for 2 Pianos (1945)
- Gifts and Semblances (1940–48)
- Five Pieces for Piano (1946–48)
- Four Juke Box Pieces (1952)
- Notes of Thanks (1954–61)
- Piano Sonata (1955)

Vocal/Choral

- Caligula for Baritone and Orch., after Robert Lowell (N.Y., Nov. 5, 1971)

== Recordings ==
Recordings in current CD release ( with selected movements available on YouTube):

- Piano Concerto (N.Y., April 27, 1952) CD Tiger of Harbin
- Divertimento (N.Y., April 5, 1946) CD Kyriena
- Ballet in E (1955) CD Kyriena
- Sonata for Violoncello and Piano (1963) CD Kyriena
- String Quartet (1951) CD Kyriena
- Sonata for 2 Pianos (1945) CD Kirill and Anna Gliadkovsky Play Alexei Haieff (also on CD Tiger of Harbin)
- Gifts and Semblances (1940–48) CD Kirill and Anna Gliadkovsky Play Alexei Haieff (also on CD Manhattan Piano)
- Five Pieces for Piano (1946–48) CD Manhattan Piano
- Four Juke Box Pieces (1952) CD Manhattan Piano (also on CD K and A Gliadkovsky Play A H)
- Notes of Thanks (1954–61) CD Manhattan Piano
- Piano Sonata (1955) CD Manhattan Piano (also on CD Tiger of Harbin)
