= Solmssen =

Solmssen is a family name and may refer to:

- Arthur R.G. Solmssen (1928–2018), American lawyer and novelist
- Georg Solmssen (1869–1957), German banker
- Peter York Solmssen (born 1955), American lawyer and business executive

== See also ==
- Solmsen (disambiguation)
