= Bible translations into Danish =

Bible translations into Danish prior to the Danish Reformation were limited. However in the mid-16th century with the Reformation's emphasis on direct study of the Bible, the need for Danish-language editions accelerated. Currently, the Danish Bible Society oversees translation and production of Church of Denmark-authorized Danish-language Bibles with the most recent full translation completed in 1992.

== Prior to the Reformation ==
Prior to the Danish Reformation, only a few biblical writings had been translated into Danish. The most extensive was the Gammeldansk Bibel written c. 1480 and translating the first 12 books of the Bible from the Latin Vulgate into Middle Danish. The translation was a difficult process resulting in a mix of literal translation and interpretation.

== Post Reformation ==
Since the 16th-century, however, the history of Danish Bible translations can generally be divided into three main periods.

=== The legacy of Luther (16th – 17th century) ===
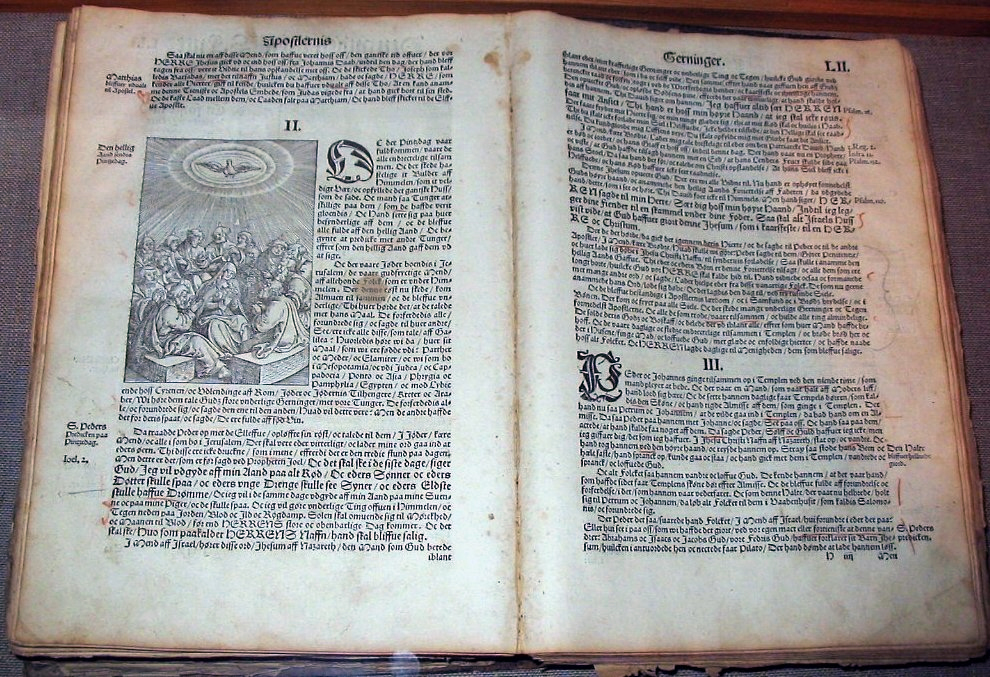
Christian III's Bible open to Acts Chapter 2 and 3

With the Reformation came an increased interest ensuring the Bible was accessible to everyone. In 1522, Martin Luther published his new translation of the New Testament from Greek and, in 1534, a translation of the entire Bible based on the Greek and Hebrew scriptures. In 1524, Christian II had Luther's translation used for a Danish-language printing of the New Testament. In 1550, Christian III authorized the first complete translation of the Bible into Danish, which was overseen by a panel of seven theologians and printed by the German printer Ludwig Dietz with 85 woodcuts from Erhard Altdorfer.

Additional translations were made in 1589 under Frederick II and in 1633 under Christian IV. These translations were more idiomatic and focused on conveying the meaning of the scripture.

=== The Resen–Svaneian tradition (17th – 19th century) ===
In 1607, Bishop Hans Poulsen Resen published a new Danish translation of the entire Bible directly from the Hebrew and Greek sources, and in 1647 a revised edition was completed by Hans Svane. These translations marked a philosophical shift in Bible translation, favoring a translation that hewed more closely to the original Hebrew and Greek sources in order to preserve the divine inspiration of the text. This philosophy guided translations until the early 20th century and included Christian VI’s 1740 Bible, the first published under the Kongelige Vajsenhus's monopoly. The last translation in the Resen–Svaneian tradition was made by the Danish Bible Society in 1871, combining a new Old Testament translation with the 1819 New Testament translation made under Frederick VI.

=== Modern translations (20th – 21st century) ===
During the 20th century, as modern Biblical criticism and biblical exegesis interpretations gained favor, new linguistic and archaeological understandings expanded the understanding of the original Hebrew and Greek sources. This resulted in a shift in translation philosophy and new Danish translations of the Old Testament in 1931 and New Testament in 1948. The latest edition in this tradition is the Church of Denmark's Danish Authorized Version of 1992 completed by the Danish Bible Society.

On 19 January 2023, the Danish Bible Society announced a "new and updated version" of the Bible to be published in 2036, stating that "the goal of the new version is for it to be written in updated language that is more relevant to the times." The year 2036 corresponds to the 500th anniversary of the Protestant Reformation in Denmark (1517 in Germany).

== Other translations ==
In parallel with these three traditions, a number of other scripture translations into Danish were published, including Jewish translations of the Pentateuch by Chief Rabbi Abraham Wolff in 1891 and a revised version that added the haftaroth in 1894; Catholic translations from the Vulgate published in 1893 and 1931; and the Danish Contemporary Bible 2020, which modernized the language of the Bible to appeal to young and secular readers.

== See also ==
- Church of Denmark
- Bible translations in Norway#Danish editions 1524-1873 - From the 16th-19th centuries, Norway shared bibles with Denmark before the emergence of Bokmål and Nynorsk editions.
