= Oscar Wassermann =

German banker

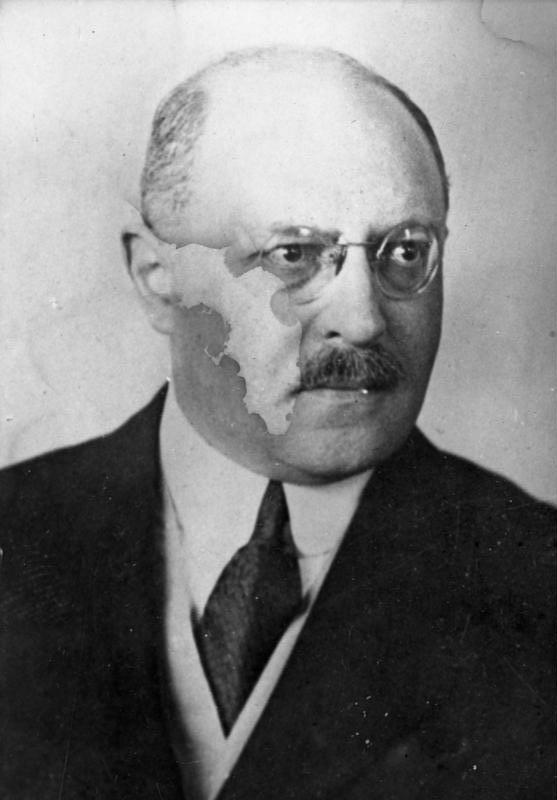
- Oscar Wassermann, 1929 (photograph provided by the German National Archive – damaged image retained because historically important)
- Born: Oscar Angelo Wassermann; 4 April 1869; Bamberg, Upper Franconia, Bavaria
- Died: 8 September 1934 (aged 65); Garmisch, Bavaria, Germany
- Occupations: Banker; Bank director
- Spouse(s): 1. Margarethe "Grete" Fürst (1892–1924); 2. Katharina "Käthe" Niemann/Haupt (1882–1942)
- Children: 1. Hedwig "Heddy" Wassermann (1912–1939); Karin "Käthe" Wassermann/Grunebaum (1918–1958)
- Parents: Emil Wassermann (1842–1911) (father); Emma Oppenheimer/Wassermann (1847–1889) (mother)

Oscar Wassermann (born 4 April 1869 in Bamberg; died 8 September 1934 in Garmisch) was a German-Jewish banker.

== Life ==
Oscar Angelo Wassermann's grandfather Samuel Wassermann (1810–1884) came to Bamberg from Regensburg and opened a bank, A. E. Wassermann, which his son Emil (1842–1911) and brother Angelo ran after his death. Emil Wassermann married Emma Oppenheimer in Frankfurt am Main. Their son Oscar was the oldest of nine or ten children; his youngest brother was German banker Sigmund Wassermann (1889–1958).

After completing a training in banking at Munich and Paris, Oscar Wassermann started work at the important Berlin subsidiary of the family bank in 1889, the year of his mother's death. In 1900 he took over the control of it, jointly with his cousin Max Wassermann (1863–1934).

The value of the business undertaken by the Wassermann Bank's Berlin subsidiary soon surpassed that of the head office branch in Bamberg, largely on account of Oscar Wassermann's profitable securities trading. Biographers suggest that the relationship between the branch director cousins, Max and Oscar Wassermann, became fractious, however. In 1912 Oscar Wassermann suddenly transferred to Deutsche Bank in Berlin. A switch from a regionally based family bank to the mighty Deutsche Bank was highly unusual, if not unprecedented. Wassermann was offered and accepted a place on the Deutsche Bank executive board, taking over responsibility for the bank's stock exchange trading business jointly with co-director Paul Mankiewitz, who was probably the man who persuaded Wassermann to make this career defining move.

After the First World War Wassermann accepted an invitation to become a member of the German Standing Finance Commission, established under the leadership of Max Warburg. It was intended by the government that the commission should negotiate the post-war financial settlement with the French, British and American governments. It turned out that the foreign governments, for their own domestic reasons, were more interested in crushing a commercial and political rival than in negotiating a financial settlement, and the German Financial Commission had little involvement in the Versailles negotiations except as a critic. The involvement nevertheless seems to have burnished Wassermann's credentials as an internationally well-connected member of Germany's banking establishment. He took a lead in the handling of Deutsche Bank's international relations, also becoming, in 1925, a member of the 14 member General Council responsible for administering the Reichsbank (the central bank of the) German Republic through years of exceptional economical challenge. As a respected Reichsbank board member he exercised significant influence over German monetary policy, especially during the later years of the German Republic.

Meanwhile, in 1922, at the request of Chancellor Cuno he prepared a report and plan to deal with the crisis created by the unaffordability of the reparations requirements imposed on Germany at Versailles in 1919. The plan foundered, primarily in the face of French intransigence, although elements of it turned up soon afterwards in the (American) Dawes Plan, intended to address the same concerns.

Between 1923 and 1933 Oscar Wassermann acted as spokesman ("Sprecher") for the Deutsche Bank executive board. The term is sometimes translated in English language sources as "CEO", which can be misleading: he was a leading member of the board, but there would have been no question of implementing significant strategic changes without the support of senior colleagues, some of whom made no secret of their objections to his (it was said) autocratic manner, and were also known to give vent to concerns over the extent to which Wassermann's spare time and (by this time very considerable) personal wealth were used on behalf of Jewish organisations. He was succeeded in the role, briefly, by the banker Georg Solmssen.

In 1929, he was a leading figure in the fusion of Deutsche Bank with Berlin's Disconto-Gesellschaft. The boards of both banks justified the move on the grounds of the "pressures to rationalise" which they faced. Agreement was announced, to widespread astonishment within and beyond the banking establishment, in September 1929 and the merger took effect on Tuesday 29 October 1929, long before the Great Depression's nature and extent of the backwash in Germany (and elsewhere) from the Wall Street crash could be foreseen. The development turned out to be strangely prescient, given the remarkably synergistic structures of the two banks. Disconto-Gesellschaft came to the union exceptionally well capitalised, and with a long-established well diversified portfolio of profitable investments in Germany's industrial giants and more widely across Europe. Deutsche Bank had been established more recently and had grown more rapidly, although it was also well integrated in the German industrial economy and well capitalised by the criteria of the time. The rolling banking crisis that followed the Wall Street crash peaked in German speaking central Europe after the Vienna-based Creditanstalt (bank) failed in May 1931. During the ensuing series of bank runs as investors rushed to withdraw their savings, the well capitalised fusion of the Deutsche Bank and the Disconto-Gesellschaft (rebranded only in 1937 as the "Deutsche Bank") survived the turmoil without ever needing to approach the government for financial support. In 1934 it was indeed Deutsche Bank that at the end of the 1930s took over what was left from the wreckage of the Creditanstalt.

The years between 1930 and 1932 were characterised by surging unemployment and intensifying political polarisation, which was increasingly spilling onto the streets, while parliament was arithmetically deadlocked by the refusal of the two populist parties to co-operate either with each other or with any of the more moderate parties. In January 1933 the National Socialists took power and quickly signalled their intention to transform Germany into a one-party dictatorship. Antisemitism became a principal driver of government strategy. On or about 9 April 1933 Oscar Wassermann, aged 64, was persuaded to resign from Deutsche Bank. His resignation letter proposed he should resign at any time up till the end of 1933. If suitable arrangements for the succession could be made before the end of the year he would be happy to go sooner. There was concern among colleagues that international markets might react adversely to a shock resignation. However, a week later he reported to colleagues that he had suffered "heart spasms" during the night, and family members including notably, one of his brothers reported that his condition was serious. Wassermann was an unusually heavy smoker and he was overweight. It was reasonable to infer that he would be confined to bed for several weeks, and might never recover his full health. Five weeks later, in the middle of May 1933, Wassermann turned up at the bank apparently fully restored. By that time, however, the succession plan that had been conspicuously absent back at the start of April was well advanced. On 29 May 1933 Wassermann's resignation was announced: his apparently amicable and consensual departure was completed well before the end of the year.

== Personal ==
Oscar Wassermann married firstly Hungarian-born Margarethe "Grete" Fürst (1892–1924) and secondly Katharina "Käthe" Haupt (1882–1942), the widow of Prof. Dr. Albert Niemann (1880–1921). By the first marriage two daughters were born, in 1912 and 1918: Karin Wassermann and Hedwig Wassermann. The family lived at Tiergartenstraße 8d in Berlin-Mitte from 1925 to 1933.

Oscar Wassermann died on 8 September 1934, "a broken man", the year after his "retirement". Leo Baeck presided at his funeral, conducted on 12 September 1934 at the Jewish cemetery in Berlin-Weissensee. Apparently none of his former Deutsche Bank colleagues attended the ceremony.

== Judaism ==
In terms of family background, Oscar Wassermann came from the increasingly prominent class of "haut-bourgeois" German-Jewish bankers that had emerged in parallel with the expansion of a commercial and industrial middle class during the eighteenth and nineteenth centuries. Members of the Jewish banking elite would, in most cases, not have identified or associated much with Jews from the working classes, many of whose families had arrived in Germany only one or two generations earlier, driven to move west by the Russian pogroms and equivalent intensifying pressures elsewhere in eastern-central Europe. Oscar Wassermann was different. He had himself received and absorbed a powerfully orthodox upbringing. Wassermann was deeply learned in the faith and strongly committed to Judaism: he saw no reason to keep that commitment private. He was engaged actively in a number of Jewish social and charitable organisations. He never joined any German-Jewish political movements, but was nevertheless widely viewed as a Zionist. In 1898 he became a member of Gesellschaft der Freunde, a genteel and long established Berlin-based Jewish welfare support organisation of which, from 1924 to 1934, he would serve as president. He became chairman of the German offshoot of "jüdische Palästinawerkes" ("Keren Hayesod") and of the associated funding operation, "Palästina Grundfonds (KH) e. V", established in 1922 with the primary objective of acquiring land in Palestine. Most of the funding he collected came from wealthy Jews whom he knew personally. It was therefore a natural move that when the Jewish Agency was established in 1929, Wassermann became chairman of the German branch. There was no requirement from the agency founder, Chaim Weizmann, that he should openly declare himself an adherent of [political] Zionism.

Wassermann served as deputy chairman of the "Verein zur Gründung und Erhaltung einer Akademie für die Wissenschaft des Judentums", founded in 1919 to create and maintain an academy of Judaic Sciences and Humanities: he organised fundraising on the association's behalf. Even during the difficult final years of his life he also continued to participate regularly in a Talmud/Study group.

== National Socialism ==
Long before 1933 Wassermann was the focus of violent antisemitic agitation. He was identified, unfairly, as one of those responsible for the so-called "Versailles Treaty of Shame", and defamed as a "representative of Jewish high finance". After the Hitler-Papen government took over in January 1933, Wassermann's removal from the Deutsche Bank executive board was only a matter of time, although it can be hard to avoid the conclusion that Wassermann, for his own personal reasons, and senior colleagues at the bank, for their own at least partly political reasons, were content that he should resign sooner rather than later. Initially it was intended that he should remain on the board of Deutsche Bank as chairman till the end of 1933. However, shortly before the annual general meeting of 1933, over which Wassermann was scheduled to preside in his capacity as "Sprecher", colleagues announced his retirement "on grounds of age".

Notwithstanding his having been the target of anti-Semitic attacks, Wassermann along with several other prominent German Jews publicly supported the National Socialist ticket in the 1933 elections.

== Art collection ==
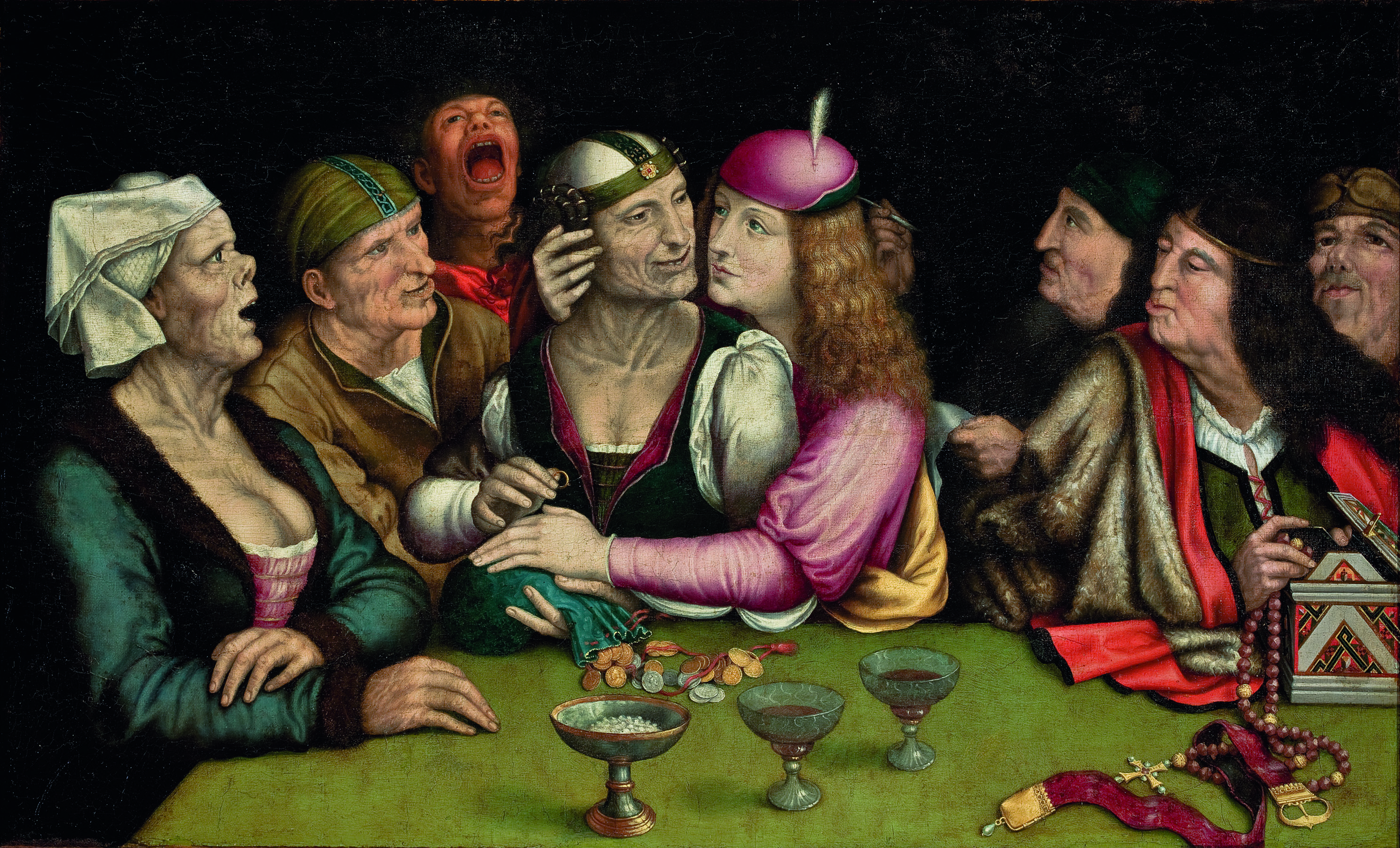
O Casamento Desigual by Quentin Metsys

Oscar Wassermann's nearest heirs, his two daughters and his widow Katharina, auctioned off works of art from his collection through the auction houses of Alfred Berkhahn and Paul Graupe. More than ten works from Oscar and Käthe Wassermann's collection were still listed in the "Lost Art Database" at Magdeburg in 2016. The requirement to raise a large amount of money arose from the requirement that the government imposed on rich Jews wishing to emigrate that they should pay a very large "emigration tax". One of the works in question, auctioned to "an unknown buyer" courtesy of Paul Graupe in June 1936, is "der Heiratskontrakt" ("The marriage contract" / "O Casamento Desigual") attributed to the Flemish master, Quentin Matsys, which is currently believed to be in Brazil. The painting hit the headlines there in 2013, with a dispute as to its ownership between the São Paulo Museum of Art, which had accepted it in good faith as a donation, and surviving heirs of Oscar Wassermann, forced to sell it in 1936 in order to escape what turned out to be the looming Holocaust. A parallel dispute was ventilated over to whether or not the attribution to Matsys was correct.

== Literature ==
- Avraham Barkai: Oscar Wassermann und die Deutsche Bank. Bankier in schwieriger Zeit. Beck, Munich 2005, ISBN 978-3-406-52958-0.
- Joseph Walk (ed.): Biography of Wasserman in: Kurzbiographien zur Geschichte der Juden 1918–1945. Munich : Saur, 1988, ISBN 3-598-10477-4, p. 379
