= Schwanenwerder =

Island in Germany

Coordinates: 52°26′51.5″N 13°10′6.56″E

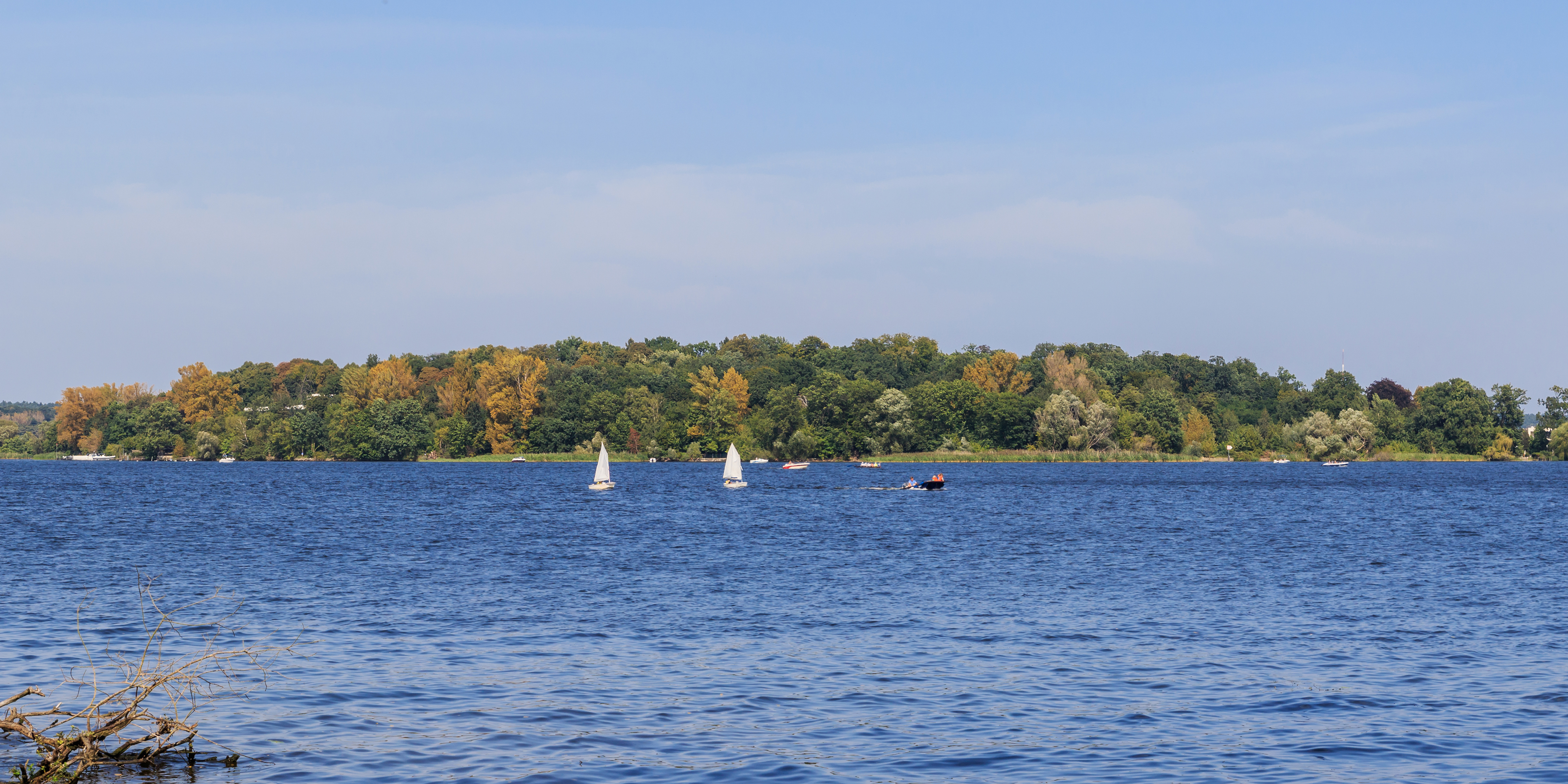
View of Schwanenwerder

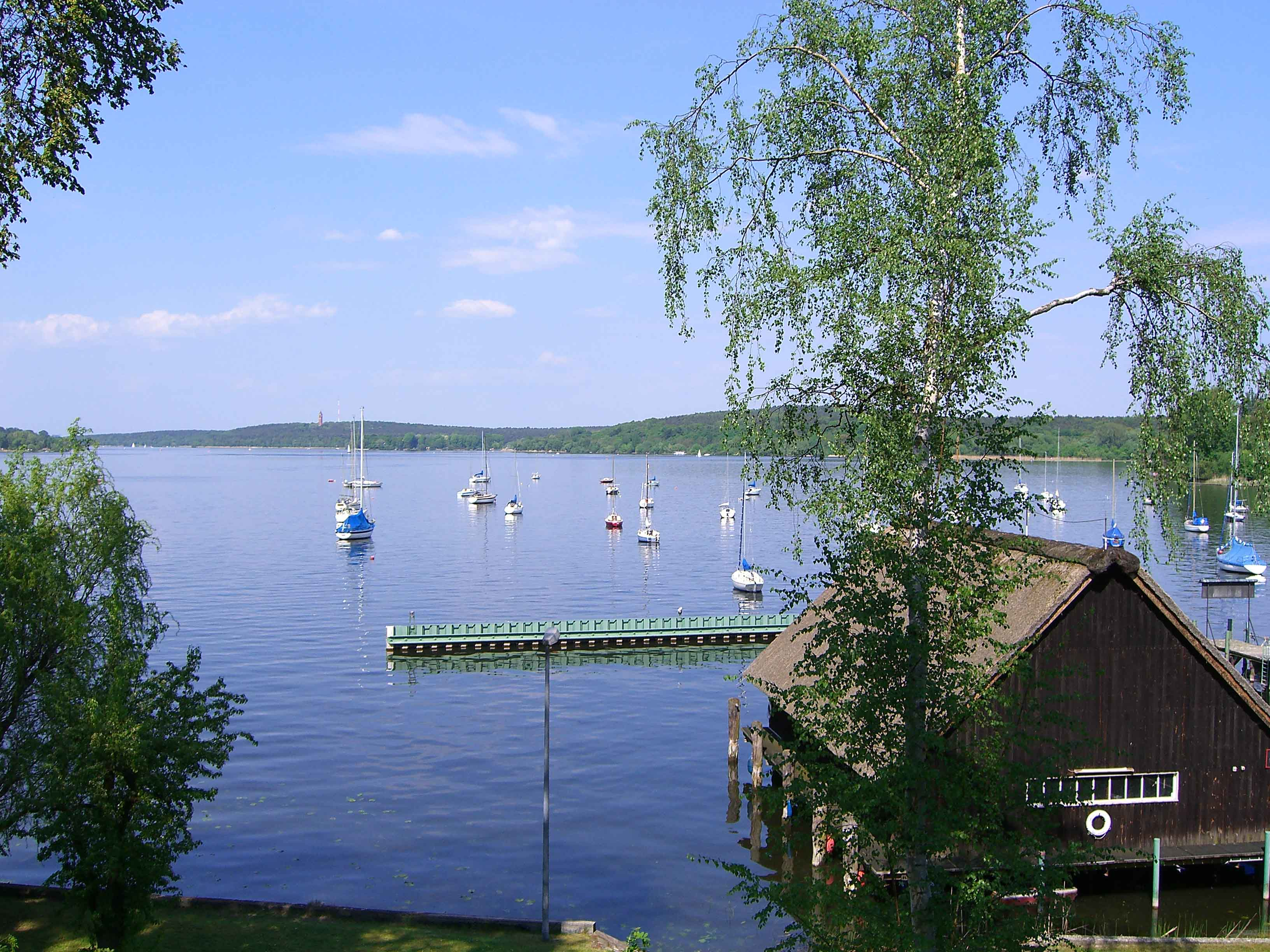
View from Schwanenwerder over the Havel river

Schwanenwerder (German pronunciation: [ˌʃvaːnənˈvɛʁdɐ]; English: "Swan Ait") is an island in the locality of Nikolassee in southwestern Berlin, located in a wider stretch of the Havel close to the eastern bank and adjacent to the Großer Wannsee to the south of it. The neighbourhood is considered an affluent residential area and was home to known people such as Alexander Parvus, Joseph Goebbels, Gustav Fröhlich, Ernst Udet, Axel Springer, and Lída Baarová.

== History ==
The river island, with an area of about 62 acres (25 ha), was first mentioned as Der Sandtwerder ("Sand Ait") in 1704. Also called Cladower Sandwerder after the opposite village of Kladow, the island in the mid 19th century was a deserted place, overgrown with shrubs and a few trees. In 1882, the island was purchased by Wilhelm Wessel, a wealthy inventor and manufacturer of kerosene lamps, for a sum of 9,000 Marks. He ordered extensive landscaping, built an access ringroad, subdivided the area and offered the lots for sale. The intention was for wealthy buyers like himself to build cottages with access to the river. He himself had a mansion, called Villa Schwanenhof (Swan Court), erected in the centre of the isle. Its continued existence makes it the oldest building on the island. For convenient access, a small bridge was built which up to today remains the only way onto the island.

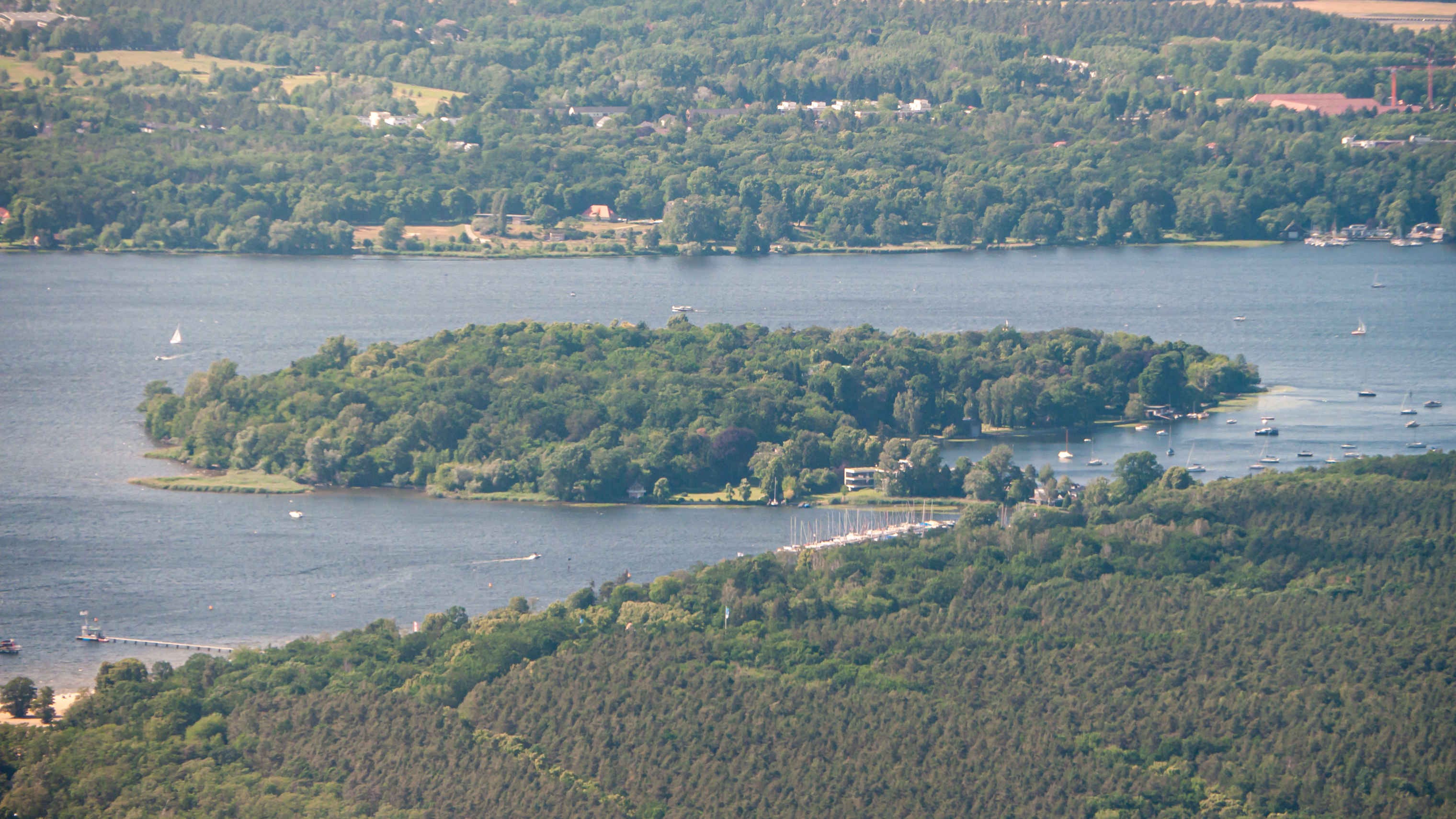
Aerial view

In 1896, a charter was drafted that banned inhabitants from setting up disturbing venues like factories and shops. Even a pier for river steamers was prohibited. In 1901, Emperor Wilhelm II granted the official use of the name Schwanenwerder, a more illustrious name than the old "Sand Ait". By then, only three villas had been erected, nevertheless the mansion colony quickly developed as a refuge of the wealthy Berlin bourgeoisie, among them Berthold Israel and Rudolph Karstadt, both owners of large department stores, the entrepreneur Leo Maximilian Baginski, the entrepreneur Waldemar Lohse, the entrepreneur Hans Quilitz, the entrepreneur Walter Sobernheim, the physician Fedor Krause, the banker Oscar Schlitter, the banker Oscar Wassermann, the banker Eduard Mosler, the banker Arthur Salomonsohn and the banker Georg Solmssen. Schwanenwerder was the most expensive property to purchase in the interwar German version of the Monopoly game.

After World War I more rich inhabitants built villas on Schwanenewerder, among them were the banker Samuel Goldschmidt, the economist Werner Feilchenfeld, the entrepreneur Alfred Guggenheim, the judge Herbert Gidion and the publisher Leo Goldstaub.

After the Nazi seizure of power in January 1933, many of the Jewish property owners were driven off or forced to sell their real estate because of the racial policy of Nazi Germany. After the elections of March 1933, SA officers from nearby Zehlendorf swarmed over the island, and a Nazi flag was hoisted prominently over the water tower. Among those who profited from these events were Minister Joseph Goebbels, who in 1935 bought the villa formerly owned by the Oscar Schlitter for a very modest sum, Three years later, he also purchased the "aryanized" neighbouring property of the Jewish banker Samuel Goldschmidt. In a similar manner Hitler's personal physician Theodor Morell acquired the premises of Georg Solmssen (the uncle of author Arthur R.G. Solmssen). Minister Albert Speer bought the property of one of the Baronesses Goldschmidt-Rothschild for only 150,000 marks, only to sell it in 1943 at a hefty premium to the Deutsche Reichsbahn. In 1937, Reich Women's Leader Gertrud Scholtz-Klink had a SS Bride School established on Schwanenwerder, where young women were indoctrinated in Nazi ideology and educated in housekeeping skills.

After World War II, disseized properties were returned to their rightful owners, if those could be found, but none of them returned. The buildings stood empty and derelict and property was sold, mostly to the community of Berlin, which at times owned up to 40% of the land. Since the late 1940s the island housed a large summer camp for children, which was closed in 2002. Until 2010 a station of the Berlin Wasserschutzpolizei was located near the Schwanenwerder bridge. The neighbouring premises formerly owned by Goebbels were leased to the Berlin Aspen Institute for several years.

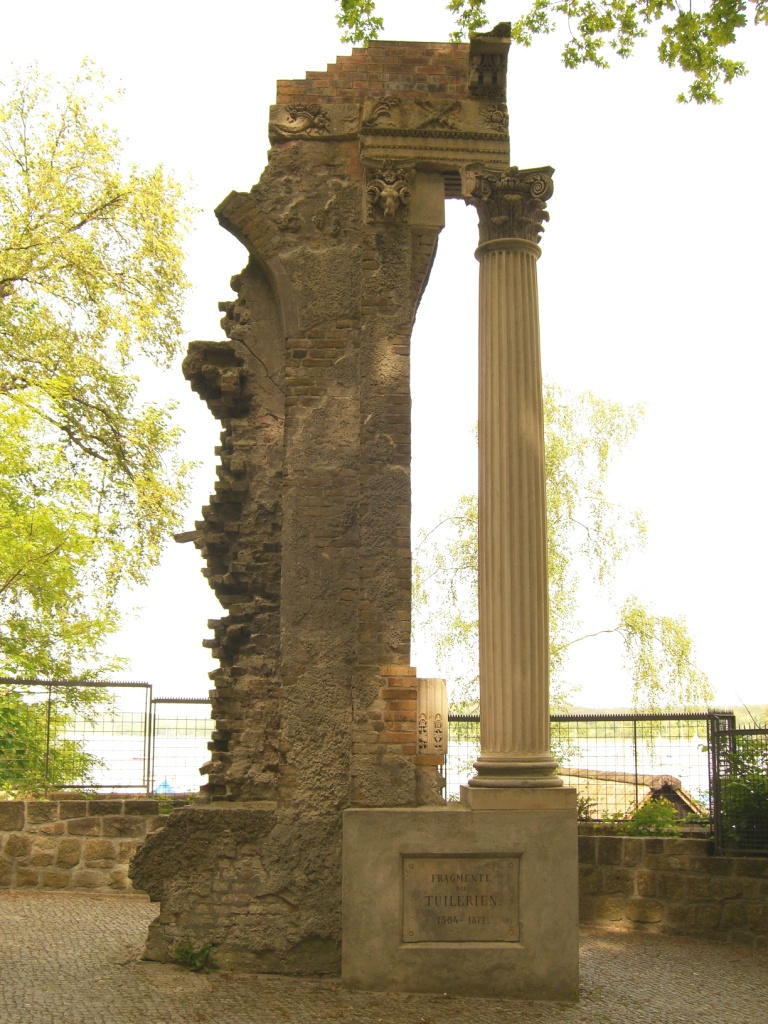
Tuileries column, re-erected on Schwanenwerder

Over the second half of the 20th century, most old mansions were torn down to be replaced with new private buildings. Remnants of the historic land development include a column of the demolished Tuileries in Paris, which was bought by Wessel in 1882 and placed on Schwanenwerder as part of a mock ruin, typical of the spirit of Romanticism in late 19th-century Germany. It is still on the island and protected as a historic monument.

== See also ==
- Pfaueninsel
