= A Princess in Berlin =

Book by Arthur Solmssen

- First edition
- Author: Arthur R.G. Solmssen
- Cover artist: Gustav Klimt, Lady with Hat and Feather Boa, 1909
- Language: English
- Genre: Historical fiction, literary realism
- Publisher: Little, Brown and Company (Boston)
- Publication date: 1980
- Publication place: United States
- Media type: Print (hardback) & e-book
- Pages: 374 pages
- ISBN: 0316803693
- OCLC: 6554764
- Dewey Decimal: 813/.54
- LC Class: PS3569.O58 P7

A Princess in Berlin is a 1980 historical novel by Arthur R.G. Solmssen.

== Plot ==
Peter Ellis is a young American artist studying in Paris in 1922. His prominent Philadelphia family ends his funding to persuade him to return home to become a doctor, but after suffering shell shock as an ambulance driver during World War I Ellis is uninterested in a conventional career. He reunites with Christoph Keith, a former Luftstreitkräfte pilot whose life he saved during the Battle of Verdun in 1916. Now a banker, Keith suggests that Ellis move to Berlin, as due to hyperinflation in the Weimar Republic it has a very low cost of living for those with hard currency. Through Keith Ellis meets the Waldsteins (as fictionalized family of German banker Georg Solmssen), an influential, wealthy, and long-assimilated German Jewish banking family, and he and the beautiful and innocent Lili, the youngest Waldstein, fall in love.

While studying art with Fritz Falke (a fictionalized George Grosz), Ellis meets many important figures in the history of Germany between the world wars including Walther Rathenau, Max Liebermann, Bertolt Brecht, Hans von Seeckt, and Hermann Göring. He witnesses the economic chaos from hyperinflation, the country's debates regarding war reparations and the treaties of Versailles and Rapallo, and the street battles between Communists and Nationalists.

Ellis helps kidnap Keith's brother Kaspar to prevent him from helping other members of Marinebrigade Ehrhardt assassinate Rathenau, and many around Ellis believe that he is an American secret agent. He becomes wealthy from currency trading through Waldstein & Co. while the country suffers from the occupation of the Ruhr. After Adolf Hitler's Beer Hall Putsch Ellis is shot by Kaspar—who joined the SS—as he kills Keith and his wife, a Waldstein. While recovering, Ellis learns that because the economy has stabilized with the Rentenmark his investments are worthless, and he is being expelled from Germany because of the scandal over the murders. After her father refuses to let him marry Lili and take her away from the country's increasing anti-Semitism, Ellis returns to America alone.

== Reception ==
A Princess in Berlin won the Athenaeum Literary Award in 1980. Christopher Lehmann-Haupt of The New York Times wrote that "[i]f the purpose of historical fiction is to tell us what the facts, the figures and the history books do not, then ... A Princess in Berlin succeeds admirably"; however, "the effect of experiencing Weimar culture through Mr. Solmssen's looking glass is a little like seeing George Grosz's caricatures as rendered by Norman Rockwell." Todd Walton, also for the Times, wrote that the promise of "a crisp, exciting opening chapter ... bogs down for lack of action ... Perhaps if there had been a little less history and a bit more depth of emotion". Kirkus Reviews was more favorable, giving Princess a starred review and stating that "Solmssen makes virtuoso use of fragmented dialogue ... and of meticulously detailed political/economic tremors, all of it splendidly exposing a society in extremis. Impressive historical fiction". Donna Bird of Green Man Review called it a "very enjoyable read". Ethan Mordden described a scene in Princess as "stunning" and "a Threepenny Opera of the aristocracy".
