= Adolph Salomonsohn =

German lawyer, banker and businessperson (1831–1919)

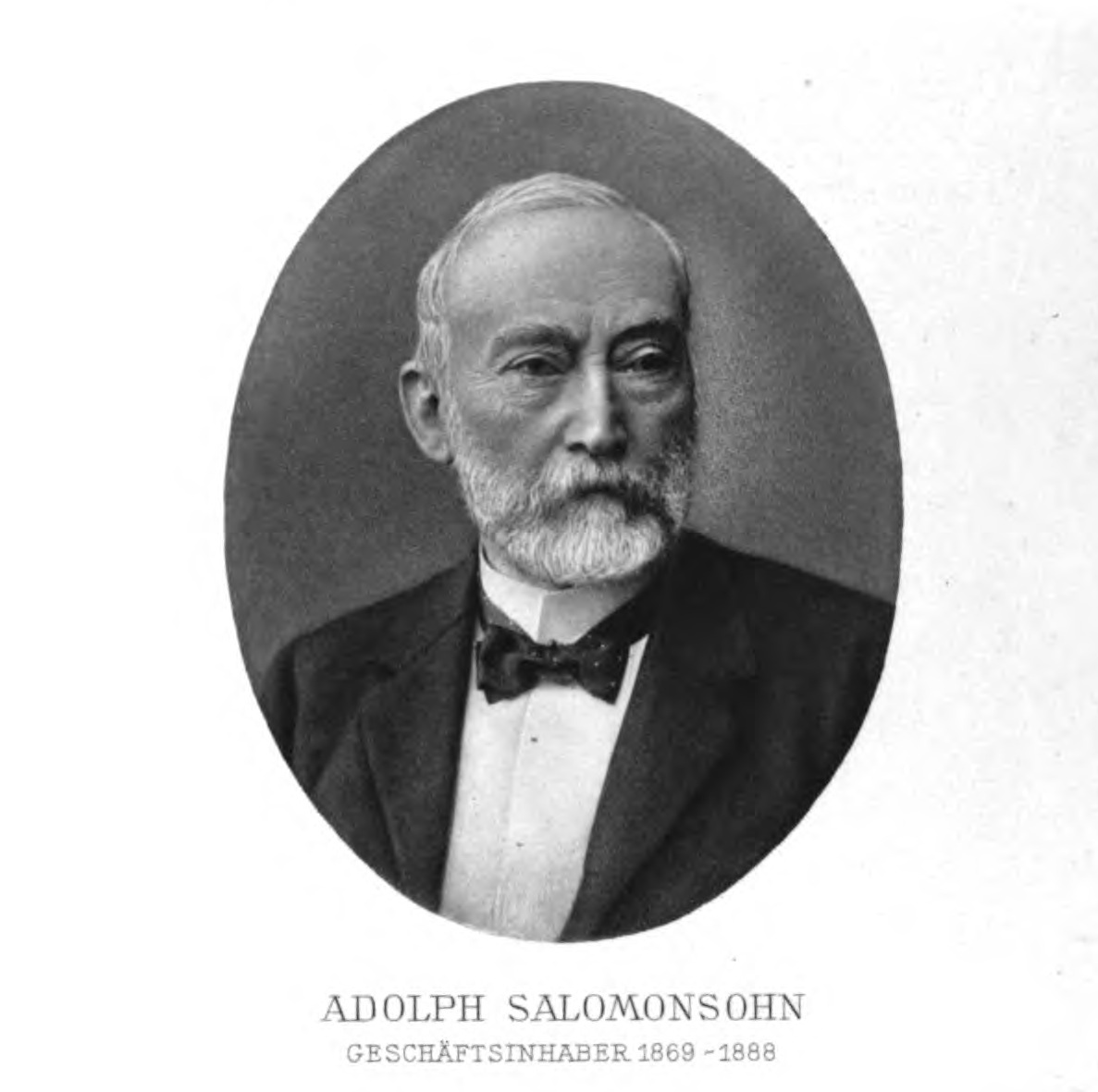
- Born: 19 March 1831; Inowrazlaw, Province of Posen, Prussia
- Died: 4 January 1919 (aged 87); Berlin, German Empire
- Occupations: Lawyer; banker; businessperson
- Organization: Disconto-Gesellschaft
- Children: 4 including, Georg Solmssen
- Relatives: Abraham Gedalia (great-grandfather); Maria Weigert Brendel (granddaughter); Cornelia Foss (great-granddaughter); Arthur Salomonsohn (nephew); Arthur R.G. Solmssen (great-great-nephew)

Adolph Salomonsohn (19 March 1831 – 4 January 1919) was a German lawyer, banker and businessperson. The proprietor of Disconto-Gesellschaft during 1869–1888, Salomonsohn influenced the establishment of the stock market in Germany.

== Early life and education ==
Adolph Salomonsohn was born on 19 March 1831 in Inowrazlaw, Prussia (present-day Inowrocław, Poland) to Gedalia Salomonsen (1799–1837), a Danish-born merchant, and Ernestine Salomonsohn (née Levÿ; 1801–1867). Through his father Salomonsohn was the grandson of Rabbi Salomon Abraham Gedalia (1776–1844) and the great-grandson of Rabbi Abraham Gedalia, the Chief Rabbi of Denmark. Salomonsohn was one of 8 siblings.

Salomonson attended a Gymnasium in Bromberg (present day, Bydgoszcz) before studying law.

== Career ==
Salomonsohn first worked as an assessor in the guardianship department of the Berlin City Court. He rejected David Hansemann's offer to work for the Disconto-Gesellschaft in Berlin and instead started to practice as a lawyer and notary in Ratibor (Racibórz). After being publicly insulted by the Prussian minister of justice, Leopold zur Lippe-Biesterfeld-Weißenfeld, Salomonsohn closed his law office to return to Berlin and started to work for the Disconto-Gesellschaft in 1863. He was given procuration in 1866 and became a proprietor in 1869.

Next to Adolph von Hansemann, Salomonsohn was influential in the nascent stock market activities in German banking. He was especially active in the funding of the Gotthard railway and remained a member of the administrative board of the Gotthard railway society until 1909. Salomonsohn was also a member of the administrative board of the Norddeutsche Bank, the "Union AG für Bergbau" (Dortmund), the potash works Aschersleben and the "Gelsenkirchener Bergwerks-AG", whose director Emil Kirdorf was a close friend.

Salomonsohn retired from the active management of the Disconto-Gesellschaft in 1888 but remained a member of the supervisory board until his death.

== Personal life ==
In 1868, Salomonsohn married Sara Rinkel (1851–1929) with whom he had four children including the banker Georg Solmssen (1869–1957). Through his daughter Charlotte Weigert (née Salomonsohn), Salomonsohn was the grandfather of Maria Weigert Brendel, a classical archaeologist and art historian, and was the great-grandfather of Cornelia Foss, an artist and teacher. Salomonsohn was the uncle of the banker Arthur Salomonsohn, and great-great-uncle of the American writer Arthur R.G. Solmssen.

On 4 January 1919 Salomonsohn died in Berlin, German Empire (present-day Germany) aged 87.
