= Maria Weigert Brendel =

German classical art expert

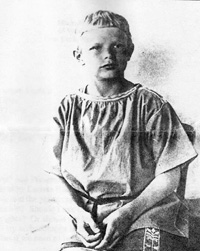
- Brendel c. 1917
- Born: Lotte Lilli Maria Weigert; 18 December 1903; Berlin. German Empire
- Died: 1994 (aged 90–91); New York City, New York, US
- Education: Heidelberg University (didn't graduate)
- Occupation: Art historian
- Spouse: Otto Brendel (m. 1929; died 1973)
- Children: Cornelia Foss
- Relatives: Adolph Salomonsohn (grandfather); Lukas Foss (son-in-law}

Maria Weigert Brendel (née Weigert; 18 December 1903–1994) was a German classical archaeologist and art historian specialising in classical art. Brendel fled Nazi Germany in 1939.

== Early life and education ==
Lotte Lilli Maria Weigert was born on 18 December 1903 in Berlin, German Empire (present-day, Germany) to a German Jewish family. Brendel's father, Erich Oskar Weigert, was a judge and Director of the Regional Court Landgerichtsdirektor. Her mother, Charlotte Weigert (née Salomonsohn), was the daughter of the lawyer and banker Adolph Salomonsohn.

Brendel was educated at a Gymnasium, and was the first girl to attend the school. Brendel was a friend and childhood neighbor of Dietrich Bonhoeffer.

Brendel attended Heidelberg University and studied under Ludwig Curtius. Whilst at university Brendel met her future husband, the fellow classical archaeologist and art historian Otto Brendel, and soon became engaged. Whilst writing of her doctoral thesis on the Ludovisi Throne, Brendel's father discovered her relationship and removed her from university. Otto Brendel received his doctorate in 1928 and the couple married in 1929.

== Career ==
During 1929–1930, the Brendel's travelled across Italy, Greece and the Balkans as part of a travel grant scholarship awarded to Otto Brendel from the German Archaeological Institute. In 1931, the Brendel's settled near the University of Erlangen–Nuremberg following Otto's appointment at the university. In 1932, the family moved to Rome for Otto's position as First Assistant at the German Archaeological Institute, but in 1936, Otto was dismissed from his post because he was married to Maria, a non-Aryan. Maria moved back to Berlin with Cornelia, living under a false name so nobody suspected her Jewish identity. On 3 September 1939, Maria and Cornelia left Germany and immigrated to St. Louis, Missouri, where Otto was already living. In 1956, they moved to New York City, where both Maria and Otto were actively involved in the Archaeology Club. Other members included Dorothy Hill, Homer and Dorothy Thompson, Frances Follin Jones of the Princeton Art Gallery, and Evelyn Harrison.

After Otto died in September 1973, his widow began to publish and distribute a number of Otto's unfinished works. She translated The Symbolism of the Sphere from German into English, and an article on "Iphigeneia in Tauris in Euripides and Goethe" from English to German. She arranged for Emeline Richardson to complete his book Etruscan Art, and later for Francesca Serra Ridgway to write the second edition. She was involved in the posthumous publication of Festschrift in his honor.

== Personal life ==
On 09 February 1929, Brendel married Otto Brendel in Grunewald, Berlin. Together they had one daughter, the artist and painter Cornelia Foss. Through her daughter, Brendel was the mother-in-law of the musician and composer Lukas Foss.

Brendel died in 1994 in New York.
