= Sigmund Wassermann =

German lawyer and banker

- Born: October 16, 1889; Bamberg, Germany
- Died: February 28, 1958 (aged 68); New York City, United States
- Occupations: Lawyer and banker
- Known for: Jewish banker that moved to the US during World war II

Sigmund Wassermann (October 16, 1889 in Bamberg - February 28, 1958 in New York) was a German lawyer and banker. He was a prominent Jewish banker who escaped Nazi Germany and emigrated to the United States during World War II.

He grew up and lived in Germany and served in German army during World War I. He became known for having to sell the painting An Allegory of Hearing by Anna Rosina de Gasc to pay for his escape. The painting was restituted to his heirs by the Dutch Restitution Commission in 2008.

== Early life until the First World War ==
Sigmund Wassermann was the youngest son of Emil Wassermann. He attended the Humanist Gymnasium in Bamberg. He went on to study at the Handelshochschule Berlin and obtained his doctorate from the University of Erlangen on October 22, 1912, with a thesis entitled "Das Sortengeschäft in Deutschland in seiner geschichtlichen Entwicklung" ("The Historical Development of the Variety Business in Germany"). At the end of his studies, he also obtained the academic degrees of Dr. rer. pol. and Dr. jur. He completed his training at Bankhaus L. Behrens & Söhne in Hamburg and at the Paris stockbroking firm Alfred Gans & Co. In 1914/1915, he worked for a short time at Deutsche Bank in Constantinople; his brother Osca later became its chairman.

== World War I ==
In 1915 Wassermann was drafted as a soldier into the 24th Bavarian Infantry Regiment in Bamberg and was promoted to lieutenant during the war. On September 19, 1917, he was awarded the "Ehrenzeichen P.E.K.. II. class". His discharge took place on December 18, 1918 from the 5th Bavarian Infantry Regiment as a result of demobilization.

As later honors he received for his participation in the war on August 18, 1927 the possession certificate of the "Prinz-Alfons-Erinnerungszeichen", donated by His Royal Highness, Prince Alfons of Bavaria, as well as on April 23, 1935 the Cross of Honor for Front Combatants based on the decree of July 13, 1934 from the Reich President Field Marshal General von Hindenburg in memory of the World War 1914/18.

== Professional career ==
On December 30, 1918, he moved from Schützenstr. 21 in Bamberg to Berlin, where he managed the Berlin branch of Bankhaus Wassermann together with his cousin Max von Wassermann. In1919 he became a member of the "Central Committee of German Jews for Aid and Reconstruction", an aid organization for Jewish emigrants from Russia. In 1929 he joined the Initiative Committee for the Expansion of the Jewish Agency. From 1924 to 1934 he lived at Tiergartenstraße 8d with his brother Oscar and his family. He then moved to Rauchstraße 14, thus remaining in a preferred residential area of Berlin. From 1930, as a partner in the Wassermann banking house, he was a member of the "American Chamber of Commerce in Germany". From 1932 to 1933, he was a member of the board of the Centralverband des Deutschen Bank- und Bankiersgewerbes. Together with Max Warburg, Willy Dreyfus and Eugen Mittwoch, he sat on the board of trustees of the Haffkine Foundation, which had taken over the supervisory duties of the "Central Committee." He left this function only after his own emigration.

== Escape from Nazi Germany and occupied Netherlands ==
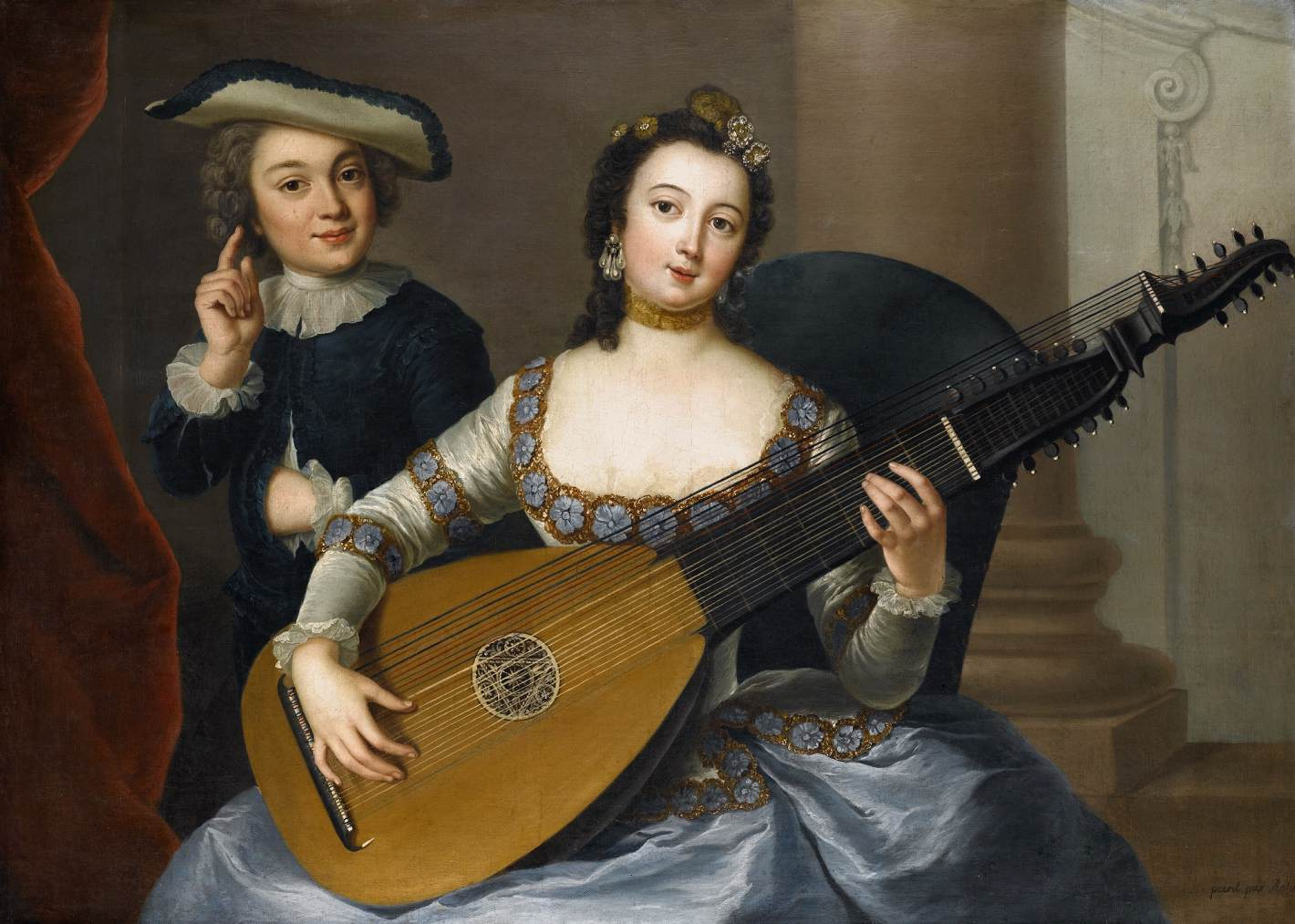
Allegorie des Hörens/Woman Playing a Lute by Anna Rosina de Gasc, born von Lisiewska

After the Nazis came to power in Germany in 1933, Wassermann was persecuted due to his Jewish heritage. On January 21, 1939, Wassermann escaped to Holland, where he worked for a short time as a banker at N.V. Fidia Financieering en Discontering Maatschappij und Bankierskantoor Albert Graef N.V.. He fled with a passport issued by the Berlin police chief together with a residence permit until September 19, 1941. His place of refuge was Honthorstraat 52 in Amsterdam.

On January 14, 1941, the occupation authorities of Nazi Germany in the Netherlands granted Wassermann permission to emigrate. He arrived in the USA via Portugal in March 1941, where he lived in New York on 2nd East 86th Street and became a US citizen on May 5, 1947.

In April 1941 he had to sell the painting by Anna Rosina de Gasc An Allegory of Hearing (also known as Woman playing a lute) to the art dealer P. de Boer through his lawyer C. F. van Veen for the price of 1,000 guilders. The painting was restituted to the heirs of Sigmund Wassermann in 2008 following a decision by the Dutch Restitution Commission.

== Activities in the United States ==
In New York Wassermann belonged to the Fire Department by December 7, 1942, and he received a "Certificate of Literacy" from New York University dated September 28, 1948. In 1946, he worked for the Eutectic Welding Alloys Corp. in Flushing, New York. He had built up the company together with his cousin René from Lausanne. He served as treasurer of the Leo Baeck Institute in New York until his death.

He remained unmarried. Sigmund Wassermann died in New York on February 28, 1958.

== Literature ==
- Ferdinand von Weyhe: A.E. Wassermann. Eine rechtshistorische Fallstudie zur „Arisierung“ zweier Privatbanken. In: H.-J. Becker (Hrsg.) u. a.: Rechtshistorische Reihe. Bd. 343, Lang, Frankfurt 2007, ISBN 978-3-631-55690-0 (zugl. Diss. Regensburg 2006, S. 48–50).
- Diana-Elisabeth Fitz: Vom Salzfaktor zum Bankier. Familie Wassermann, Spiegelbild eines emanzipatorischen Einbürgerungsprozesses. Steinmeier, Nördlingen 1992, ISBN 3-927496-17-0, S. 103–106.
- National-Archiv (Königreich der Niederlande), NBI 20736 (WE'3907)
- Biographisches Handbuch der deutschsprachigen Emigration nach 1933. K. G. Saur, München / New York / London / Paris 1980, ISBN 3-598-10087-6, S. 797 (mit Werner Röder, Band I: Politik, Wirtschaft, öffentliches Leben) Google Books
- Investigatory report on Wassermann (RC 1.86) - 1 December 2008, S. 2–3.
- Avraham Barkai: Oscar Wassermann und die Deutsche Bank. Bankier in schwieriger Zeit. Beck, München 2005, ISBN 3-406-52958-5.
- Wassermann, Sigmund, in: Joseph Walk (Hrsg.): Kurzbiographien zur Geschichte der Juden 1918–1945. München : Saur, 1988, ISBN 3-598-10477-4, S. 379

== Links ==
- Recommendation regarding Wassermann. Restitutiecommissie
- Banken jüdischen Ursprungs. Juden in Bamberg
- Guide to the Papers of the Wassermann Family 1842-1942
