= Follin =

Follin may refer to:

First name

- Follin Horace Pickel (1866-1949), Quebec physician and politician

Middle name

- Frances Follin Jones (1912–1999), American Classicist and the former curator

Surname

- Eugène Follin (1823–1867), French surgeon and ophthalmologist
- Mike Follin, a computer game programmer
- Richie Follin, American guitarist, keyboard player, singer songwriter in many bands like The Willowz, Guards, CRX
- Tim Follin (born 1970), a video game music composer

== Others ==
- Follin, American musical duo made up of Richie and Madeline Follin

== See also ==
- Folin (disambiguation)
