= Inside Moves =

1980 film by Richard Donner

- Theatrical release poster
- Directed by: Richard Donner
- Screenplay by: Valerie Curtin; Barry Levinson
- Based on: Inside Moves by Todd Walton
- Produced by: Mark M. Tanz; R. W. Goodwin
- Starring: John Savage; David Morse; Diana Scarwid; Amy Wright
- Cinematography: László Kovács
- Edited by: Frank Morriss
- Music by: John Barry
- Production company: Goodmark Productions
- Distributed by: Associated Film Distribution
- Release date: December 19, 1980
- Running time: 113 minutes
- Country: United States
- Language: English
- Box office: $1.2 million

Inside Moves is a 1980 American drama film directed by Richard Donner from a screenplay by Valerie Curtin and Barry Levinson, based on the novel of the same name by Todd Walton. The film stars John Savage, David Morse, Diana Scarwid and Amy Wright. At the 53rd Academy Awards, Scarwid was nominated for Best Supporting Actress for her performance.

== Plot ==
After a suicide attempt leaves a man named Roary partially crippled, he finds himself living in a rundown house in Oakland, California. He spends a lot of time at a neighborhood bar, which is full of other disabled people and becomes best friends with Jerry Maxwell, the barman with a bad leg.

Jerry gains the attention and respect from the Golden State Warriors when he scrimmages player Alvin Martin and loses narrowly. After the bar owner Max suffers a heart attack, a new waitress named Louise is hired. Roary develops romantic feelings for Louise.

Jerry's luck turns around when Alvin lends him the money for an operation to fix his leg. Once he is fully healed, Jerry becomes a basketball star, fulfilling his lifelong dream. However, he abandons his old friends by pretending they never existed.

Later, Jerry's old friends begin to resent him for his negligence, Roary visits Jerry and pressures him to visit the bar. Jerry offers up a half-hearted excuse for his absence and despite Roary's feelings, begins seeing Louise in secret.

Roary finally confronts Jerry about his behavior and offers some final thoughts on their friendship and what the bar and its patrons meant during his recovery. After Roary leaves, Jerry angrily reflects on his past decisions.

Roary reunites with Louise. Jerry returns to the bar and reveals his insecurities to his old friends, who understand right away. For the first time in 25 years, Max closes the bar, so everyone can attend Jerry's basketball game.

== Cast ==
- John Savage as Roary
- David Morse as Jerry Maxwell
- Diana Scarwid as Louise
- Amy Wright as Anne
- Tony Burton as Lucius
- Bill Henderson as Blue Lewis
- Steve Kahan as Burt
- Jack O'Leary as Max
- Bert Remsen as Stinky
- Harold Russell as Wings
- Pepe Serna as Herrada
- Harold Sylvester as Alvin Martin
- Arnold Williams as Benny
- George Brenlin as Gil
- Gerri Dean as Hooker
- William Frankfather as Fryer

== Production ==
In his 2006 audio commentary for Superman II: The Richard Donner Cut, Richard Donner states that he agreed to direct Inside Moves only to take his mind off being fired and replaced from Superman II. He referred to Inside Moves as "the smallest film I could do that was just very near and dear to me, at that point, and I felt this is going to take my mind totally off that." The film marked the return to the screen by disabled veteran Harold Russell, 34 years after his Academy Award-winning role in The Best Years of Our Lives.

Donner's biographer James Christie relates how Donner would often confuse cinematographer László Kovács with his fellow Hungarian cinematographer Vilmos Zsigmond. When Zsigmond visited the set, Donner had T-shirts made up that read "MY NAME IS NOT LÁSZLÓ" and "MY NAME IS NOT VILMOS" for each of them. Later, they switched shirts and confused everyone.

== Reception ==
=== Critical response ===
Metacritic, which uses a weighted average, assigned the film a score of 63 out of 100, based on 8 critics, indicating "generally favorable" reviews. Janet Maslin of The New York Times wrote that "Inside Moves is such a well-acted movie, and parts of it are so effectively offbeat, that it rises above its own potential for sappiness, just as surely as its characters triumph over their troubles." Maslin also called it "a modest and sentimental movie, but also one that, on its own terms, accomplishes what it means to." Emanuel Levy described the film as "a compassionate, well acted melodrama about what it means to be a disabled American."

Inside Moves holds a 67% rating on Rotten Tomatoes based on six reviews.

=== Accolades ===
Year	Award	Category	Recipient	Result
1981	53rd Academy Awards	Best Supporting Actress	Diana Scarwid	Nominated
1982	15th Turkish Film Critics Association (SİYAD) Awards	Best Foreign Film	Inside Moves	8th Place

== See also ==
- List of basketball films
