= Francesca Ridgway =

Scholar of Etruscan and Italic archaeology

Francesca Romana Serra Ridgway (born 9 March 1936, in Rome, Kingdom of Italy; died 7 March 2008, in Colchester, Essex (U.K.)) was a leading twentieth century scholar of Etruscan and Italic archaeology.

Born Francesca Romana Serra in Rome, Ridgway was one of five children born to Sardinian parents. Her maternal grandfather was the scholar Giovanni Sanna. Francesca Romana Serra Ridgway was the spouse and academic partner of David Ridgway, whom she married in 1970. Trained at the University of Rome La Sapienza, Francesca Romana Serra Ridgway was a student of Massimo Pallottino. She graduated from La Sapienza in 1964 where she wrote a thesis on a class of Caeretan impasto pottery known as "impasto stampigliato". As a postgraduate in the Scuola Archeologica in Rome, she was taught by both Giovanni Becatti and Renato Peroni.

She worked for many years in Scotland where she was Honorary Fellow in the Department of Archaeology (later, Classics) at Edinburgh University. Upon the retirement of her husband in 2003, she became an Associate Fellow of the Institute of Classical Studies in London.

With her husband she produced a major study of pre-Roman Italy that appeared in 1979 and became a seminal work in the study of contact archaeology and cultural change in Iron Age Italy. She conducted archaeological fieldwork at Etruscan sites in Italy and was involved in her husband's work related to excavations conducted on the island of Ischia.

== Publications ==
1. David Ridgway and Francesca R. Serra Ridgway. 1979. Italy before the Romans: the Iron Age, Orientalizing, and Etruscan periods. London: Academic Press.
2. Otto Brendel; Francesca R. Serra Ridgway. 1995. Etruscan Art. 2nd edition. New Haven: Yale University Press.
3. 1996. I corredi del fondo Scataglini a Tarquinia: scavi della fondazione Ing. Carlo M. Lerici del Politecnico di Milano per la Soprintendenza archeologica dell'Etruria meridionale. Milan: Edizioni Et.
4. Giuliana Riccioni and Francesca Romana Serra Ridgway. 2003. Vasi greci da Vulci: necropoli dell'Osteria; scavi Ferraguti-Mengarelli 1929 - 1931. Milan: Comune di Milano.
5. Festschrift David Ridgway; Francesca R. Serra Ridgway; Edward Herring; et al.. 2006. Across Frontiers: Etruscans, Greeks, Phoenicians & Cypriots. Studies in honour of David Ridgway and Francesca Romana Serra Ridgway. London: Accordia Research Institute, University of London. WorldCat.
6. Francesca R. Serra Ridgway; Lisa Pieraccini. 2010. Pithoi stampigliati ceretani: una classe originale di ceramica etrusca. Rome: "L'Erma" di Bretschneider.
