= Leo Maximilian Baginski =

Leo Maximilan Baginski, known as Max Baginski (born June 7, 1891, in Kolmar (now Chodzież), Province of Posen; died March 19, 1964, in Locarno, Switzerland) was a German entrepreneur, inventor and marketing specialist. He invented the "Spalt" tablet, an analgesic bearing a characteristic split mark. He donated the funds for building the Catholic parish church of St. Katharina in Bad Soden am Taunus, Germany.

== Early life ==
Max Baginski was born as one of seven children of a mason and contractor. After the death of his father in 1897, he lived with aunt and uncle. After school he went to Berlin, where he completed a mercantile apprenticeship. He quit his first job after six months and started his own business marketing a first patented invention, an all-purpose bottle cap. In 1912 he acquired the pharmaceutical firm Dr. Ballowitz & Co. in Berlin. While he served in the German armed forces during World War I, his companies were run by three of his sisters. In 1920 he married Katharina Stanke (1900–1982). The couple had three daughters and one son and lived during 1920er on island Schwanenwerder.

== Inventions ==
The big success of another invention, a massage device, enabled Baginski to expand his enterprise. In 1931 he teamed up with the prominent serologist Hans Much (1880–1932) and founded another company named Prof. Dr. med. Much'sche Präparate m.b.H., where the "Spalt" tablet was created in 1932. After World War II, however, most of his production plants ended up in the Soviet zone. Baginski himself was accused of having had employed forced labourers, arrested, and sent to the Buchenwald concentration camp. There he vowed to build a church, if he survived.

The Soviet authorities released Baginski in August 1948. From his enterprises only Dr. Ballowitz & Co. had escaped disappropriation, but fortunately, this was where all his trademarks had been registered. This enabled Baginski to go on producing his articles which he did in Bad Soden am Taunus, a spa town some 15 Kilometers northwest of Frankfurt am Main. In 1953, a new factory of the Prof. Dr. med. Much AG started production and in 1955 Baginski fulfilled his vow by providing the funds for a new church for the town's Catholic parish, a new vicarage and a kindergarten that today bears Baginski's name.

== Death ==
Before his death in 1964, Max Baginski put his son Jürgen in control of Prof. Dr. med Much AG. Jürgen Baginski sold the company in 1972 to American Home Products Corp. This group, that changed its name to Wyeth in 2002, integrated Much AG into its subsidiary Whitehall International. The factory in Bad Soden was closed in 1993.
