= Abraham Wolff =

Chief Rabbi of Denmark (1833–1891)

Abraham Alexander Wolff
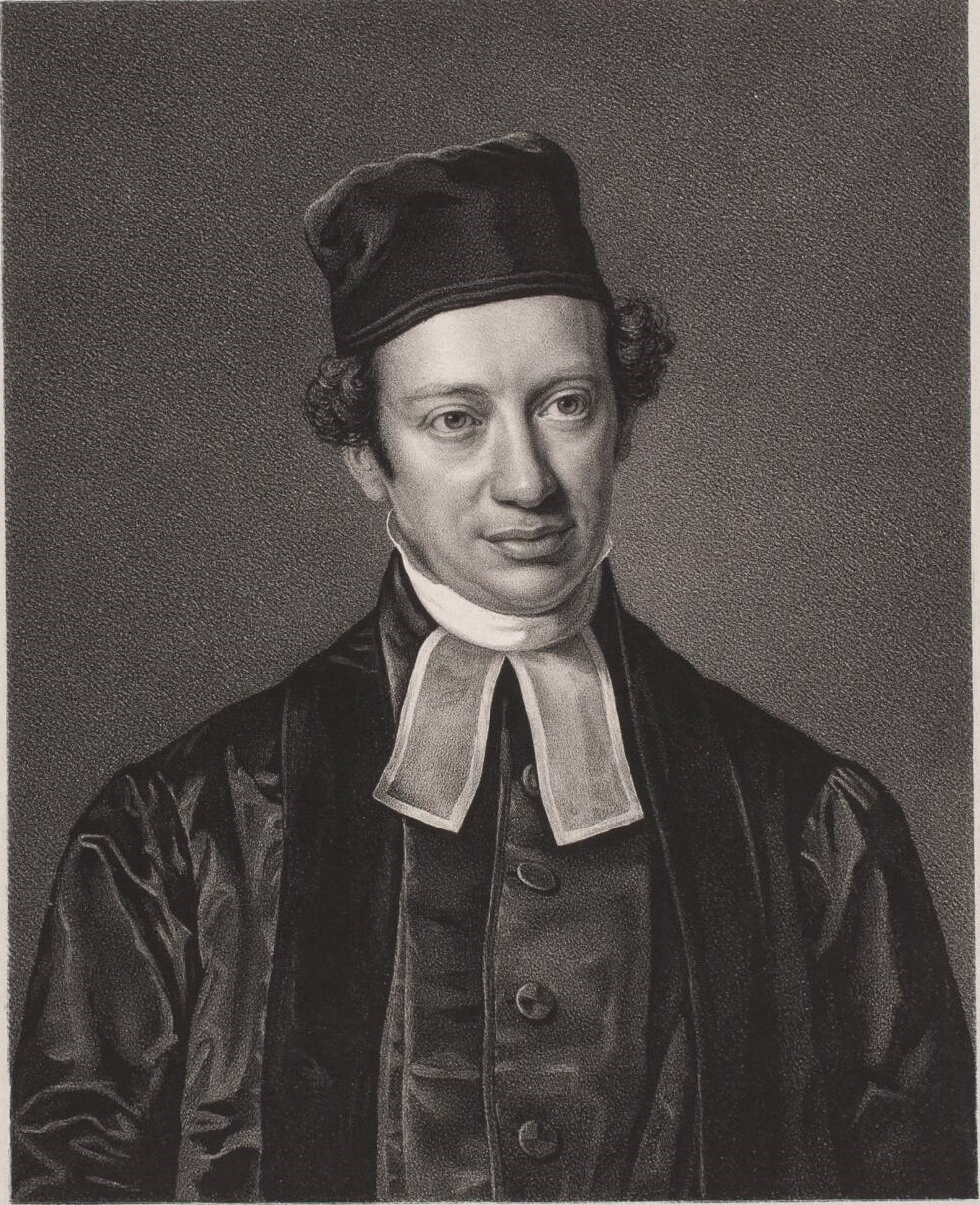
- Title: Chief Rabbi of Denmark

Personal life
- Born: 29 April 1801 Darmstadt, Hesse-Darmstadt
- Died: 3 December 1891 (aged 90) Copenhagen, Denmark
- Spouse: Johanna Goldschmidt (m. 1826; died 1876)

Religious life
- Religion: Judaism

Jewish leader
- Predecessor: Abraham Gedalia
- Successor: David Simonsen
- Synagogue: Great Synagogue of Copenhagen
- Began: 12 April 1833
- Ended: 3 December 1891

Abraham Alexander Wolff (Hebrew: אברהם אלכסנדר וולף; 29 April 1801 – 3 December 1891) was the chief rabbi of Denmark and translator of the Torah into Danish.

Wolff was born in Darmstadt, Hesse-Darmstadt, to the merchant Alexander W. Gans and his wife Henriette. He lived in Damstadt until the age of 16 at which time he was sent away to study as a Judaic scholar. He first studied with a rabbi in Mainz before studying under Chief Rabbi Abraham Bing in Würzburg, Bavaria. In 1819, he entered the University of Würzburg, studying philosophy and theology. He completed his studies in 1821 at the University of Giessen with a dissertation on the Prophet Habakkuk.

After graduating, he was appointed rabbi in Giessen and in 1826 Louis I, Grand Duke of Hesse, named him chief rabbi of the Grand Duchy of Hesse. That same year, he married Johanna Goldschmidt (1806–1876) in Frankfurt am Main. Two years later, Frederick VI named Wolff chief rabbi of Denmark with the approval of Copenhagen's Community of the Mosaic Faith, succeeding Abraham Gedalia who died in 1827. He took office on 15 May 1829.

One of his first tasks was to complete the Great Synagogue on Krystalgade in Copenhagen. The first synagogue on Læderstræde was destroyed in the Copenhagen Fire of 1795 and prior to Wolff's arrival the congregation had secured a new building site, but still needed to raise considerable funds to complete the building. Wolff managed to raise the necessary funds and the Great Synagogue opened on 12 April 1833.

Wolff translated into Danish a book of Jewish prayers in 1856 and his translation into Danish of the Pentateuch was published in 1891, followed by a posthumous revision that included the haftarah in 1894. He also wrote several texts on Jewish faith and history, as well as Talmud Enemies (Talmudfjender, 1878) which responded to attacks by some Danish clergymen on the Jews and Judaism.

Wolff is credited with gradually reforming and modernizing Jewish life in Denmark by seeing Jewish worship become more a private mater and reinforcing the separation of secular and religious spheres. He also worked to reconcile differences between orthodox believers and reformers in part by issuing his 1856 prayer book translations with the Hebrew prayers printed alongside the Danish translation. He also preached sermons in Danish and incorporated Danish choral works accompanied by organ.

Wolff continued as chief rabbi of Copenhagen until his death in 1891. He is buried in Copenhagen's Jewish Northern Cemetery.
