= Lukas Foss =

German-American composer, pianist and conductor (1922–2009)

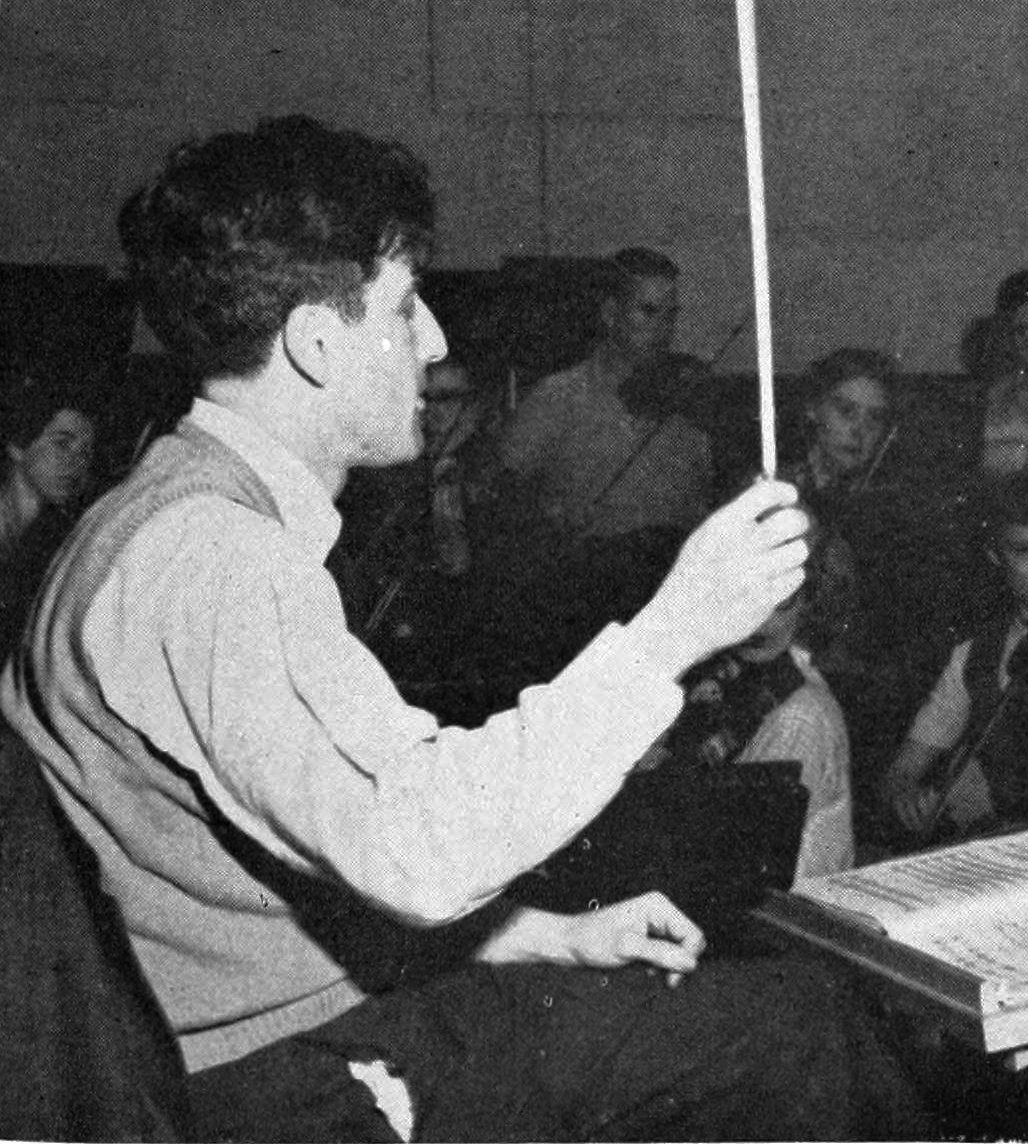
- Foss in 1960
- Born: Lukas Fuchs; August 15, 1922; Berlin, Germany
- Died: February 1, 2009 (aged 86); New York City, U.S.
- Education: Curtis Institute of Music; Berkshire Music Center; Yale University
- Occupations: Composer; pianist; conductor
- Spouse: Cornelia Brendel (m. 1951)
- Children: 2

Lukas Foss (August 15, 1922 – February 1, 2009) was a German-American composer, pianist, and conductor.

== Career ==
Born Lukas Fuchs in Berlin, Germany, in 1922, Foss was soon recognized as a child prodigy. He began piano and theory lessons with Julius Goldstein [Herford] in Berlin at the age of six. His parents were Hilde (Schindler) and the philosopher and scholar Martin Foss. In 1933, when Adolf Hitler came to power, the Fosses, who were Jewish, moved to Paris, where Lukas studied piano with Lazare Lévy, composition with Noël Gallon, orchestration with Felix Wolfes, and the flute with Marcel Moyse. In 1937, Lukas moved with his parents and brother to the United States, where his father (on advice from the Quakers, who had taken the family in upon arrival in Philadelphia) changed the family name to Foss. He studied at the Curtis Institute of Music with Isabelle Vengerova (piano), Rosario Scalero (composition), and Fritz Reiner (conducting).

At Curtis, Foss began a lifelong friendship with classmate Leonard Bernstein, who later called him an "authentic genius". In 1961, Bernstein conducted the premiere of Foss's Time Cycle. Foss conducted the premiere of Bernstein's Symphonic Dances from West Side Story.

Foss also studied with Serge Koussevitzky during the summers from 1939 to 1943 at the Berkshire Music Center (now known as the Tanglewood Music Center) and, as a special student, composition with Paul Hindemith at Yale University from 1939 to 1940. He became an US citizen in 1942.

Foss was appointed professor of music at UCLA in 1953, replacing Arnold Schoenberg. While there, he founded the Improvisation Chamber Ensemble, which made its Boston debut in 1962 for the Peabody Mason Concert series. He founded the Center of the Creative and Performing Arts in 1963 while at the State University of New York at Buffalo.

Over six separate years from 1961 to 1987, Foss was the music director of the Ojai Music Festival. From 1963 to 1970 he was music director of the Buffalo Philharmonic Orchestra. From 1971 to 1988, he was music director of the Brooklyn Philharmonic (formerly Brooklyn Philharmonia), while also music director of the Jerusalem Symphony Orchestra from 1972 to 1976. From 1981 to 1986, he was conductor of the Milwaukee Symphony Orchestra. He was a professor of music, theory, and composition at Boston University beginning in 1991. In 1994, he conducted a concert in the Naumburg Orchestral Concerts, in the Naumburg Bandshell, Central Park, in the summer series. His students include Lauren Bernofsky, Faye-Ellen Silverman, Ivana Themmen, Claire Polin, and Rocco Di Pietro.

Foss is grouped in the "Boston School" along with Arthur Berger, Irving Fine, Alexei Haieff, Harold Shapero, and Claudio Spies. He was a National Patron of Delta Omicron, an international professional music fraternity. In 2000, he was awarded a Gold Medal by the American Academy of Arts and Letters.

== Personal life ==
In 1951, Foss married Cornelia Brendel, an artist and painter who was born in Berlin in 1931, was the daughter of art historian Otto Brendel and Maria Weigert Brendel. The couple had two children, Christopher Brendel Foss, who became a documentary filmmaker and corporate consultant on social and environmental engagement/sustainability communications, and Eliza Foss Topol, an actress. Foss and his wife were separated for almost five years from 1968 to 1972, during which Cornelia was the lover of pianist Glenn Gould and moved with the two children to Toronto, an arrangement that she later called, "a perfect triangle".

Foss, who had Parkinson's disease in his final years, died at his home in Manhattan on February 1, 2009, aged 86, of a heart attack.
