= Fohlin =

Fohlin is a surname.

== People with the surname ==
- Adina Fohlin (born 1984), Swedish model and photographer
- Caroline Fohlin, American academic
- Meit Fohlin (born 1971), Swedish politician

== See also ==
- Folin (disambiguation)
