= Solmsen =

Solmsen is a family name and may refer to:

- Felix Solmsen (1865–1911), German linguist
- Friedrich Solmsen (1904–1989), German classical scholar

== See also ==
- Solmssen (disambiguation)
