= Martin Foss =

American philosopher, professor and scholar (1889–1968)

Martin Foss (1889–1968) was a German-born American philosopher, professor, and scholar.

== Life and career ==
Martin Foss was born in Berlin, Germany, in 1889 and studied philosophy and law at German and French universities. He married Hilde Schindler, and they had two children, Oliver Foss, a painter, and the composer Lukas Foss. The Jewish family left Germany in 1933 when Adolf Hitler came into power, and for the next four years Martin Fuchs commuted secretly between Paris and Berlin. With the help of the Quaker community in the United States, the family was able to immigrate to the U.S. in 1937. The Quakers provided initial shelter for the family and advised Martin to change the family name from Fuchs to Foss. (It is unknown why the name was not changed to Fox, which is what "Fuchs" means.) Martin subsequently became an American citizen. He taught philosophy at Haverford College, where he retired as professor emeritus, as well as at Temple University. He died of a heart attack at the age of 79, while he was running to catch a plane at Heathrow Airport.

Martin Foss taught and wrote during a time when phenomenology dominated and influenced many thinkers, such as Martin Heidegger, Ortega y Gasset, and Jean-Paul Sartre. Existentialism was also popular, but his view of existence was based more on the views of Medieval thinkers such as Cusanus. Foss was considered to be an Aristotelian philosopher. He was a student of Max Scheler, whose works had a significant influence on his ideas about ethics, value and love.

Martin Foss's book, Symbol and Metaphor in Human Experience, was listed as one of the “Most Neglected Books of the Past 25 Years” by The American Scholar in 1956. Other writers have cited his work as being "far-reaching," "seminal," and "ahead of its time." In the academic treatise, The Faces of Reason: An Essay on Philosophy and Culture in English Canada, 1850-1950, authors Leslie Armour and Elizabeth Trott state that Martin Foss may be considered a greater philosopher than Martin Heidegger. Although Martin Heidegger has clearly had far greater recognition and impact, Martin Foss's work deserves renewed attention.

== Professor Martin Foss ==
Professor Foss was highly regarded by his Haverford College students, as written in their class of 1948 yearbook dedication:

"Soon after his arrival on the Haverford campus, Dr. Martin Foss impressed his unique personality on the students who were lucky enough or foresighted enough to take one of his courses. In his own inimitable manner, Dr. Foss graphically developed the neophytes into thinking students. By driving home his points with emotional style so characteristic of him and him alone. Dr. Foss instilled a love of his subject into all of us who studied under him. No other professor in recent memory has so often been imitated in campus skits with such friendly satire. Dr. Foss' own brand of "Phil-Foss-ophy" has, of necessity, been responsible for such well-known phrases as "Yes, my dear, but you see..." and "the stream of life, the flux". Standing fast to his views on any particular subject, Dr. Foss will fall back on his two favorite philosophers, Kant and Aristotle, to back him up. A man with such deep scholarly convictions and great love for his chosen profession could not help but make a profound impression on the students of Haverford, and it is with the deepest gratitude and respect that we dedicate the 1948 RECORD to Martin Foss, teacher, scholar, and friend."

== Philosophy ==
Martin Foss’s work deals with the “large” issues of life—love, death, and creative rebirth. His writings on art and creative process are particularly noteworthy, offering a missing perspective in that genre. His texts reach far beyond philosophy, and have been used in academic depth psychology, theology, and art programs, as well as philosophy programs.

Foss's perspective on Greek tragedy is important and unprecedented. His views on tragedy as religious drama give new meaning to the word "religion."

=== Culture, meaning and destiny ===
In his seminal book Symbol and Metaphor In Human Experience, for which he is primarily known, Foss explains the difference between the Self as a maker of things and the creative process of personality. The germ of this distinction is developed as well in another of his books, Death, Sacrifice, and Tragedy, which explores in more detail the meanings of Greek and Shakespearean tragedies. In Foss’s view, the significance of Greek tragedy involves the discovery of the "creative and dynamic personality and man's sacrificial and intercessional nature."

He writes: "life in its core is a perpetual conversion from a lower sphere to a higher one, destroying the lower for the sake of realizing the higher, and this creative destruction, the sacrificial action, conveys to life its essential character, which is sacramental."

The theme of death, sacrifice, and tragedy is the basis for his view of ethics which supplants the modern humanist perspective that is limited to pragmatic man using his environment solely for fulfilling the needs and desires of the body. This use of the environment for practical expediency is a sphere which man and the animal have in common. It is the world of order and the making of things for their various uses. But beyond the physical world, Foss argues that man is a citizen of another world as well, a world that is hidden but disclosed. This world is the sphere of value "where no things, no accomplishments, no possessions as such count, but where works and achievements manifest a loving communion and nothing else." In Foss’s view, the purpose of human life is to serve this spiritual, transcendent world, which rises before man as the meaning and destiny of his life. Through sacrifice and the creative process of personality, man is lifted into this world of intensive reality, which shapes his destiny.

Foss contrasts this concept of creation with the commonly accepted ethic of utilitarianism that is prevalent in modern societies. He writes that an ethics of utilitarianism enables a "rational organization of a collective ritual of law," and he defines rituals of law as symbolic reductions that are finite and relative (i.e., not the source of absolute ethical values). Stuck in this deficient sphere, man desires a more meaningful life, which involves seeking the higher realm of creation. Foss refers to this choice as "man under destiny." It is not an easy way of living, since one must accept the sacramental nature of life and the communion of Love as the source of one's direction in life.

=== Consciousness ===
While other great thinkers in the early 20th century such as Carl Jung and Sigmund Freud concentrated their research on defining the human unconscious, Martin Foss took on its natural counterpoint, consciousness. The main premise of consciousness was that it wasn’t a static object of humanity comprehendible only by philosophers and theologians. Consciousness is a process whose partner is life. Foss wrote “we are here in a realm where consciousness has not an object, not a content detached from itself, but is aware merely of its own drive and destiny”. Consciousness contains all the potential of human existence. “Consciousness is real, is being; it may be potential being, but even as potential it is in a process of realization in which no distinction can be made between that which is but could also not be (matter or mere possibility) and that which essentially and necessarily is (form)”. By attaching the conditionality of potential to his definition of consciousness, Foss essentially said that human beings have no limitations on what they can be, perceive, and create. An idea existing only in the mind is as real as what is perceived via the physical senses.

=== Martin Foss and other philosophers ===
Foss's work diverges in important ways from that of Carl Jung. Both scholars were writing in parallel (during the same period of time) about similar concepts, although Foss highlights the creative process as the central element of life in a way that Jung does not. Jung's definition of the symbol is very different from Foss's. In Jung's view, a symbol has great meaning, deriving from the collective unconscious. Contrary to Jung, Foss uses the term "symbol" to refer to that which is man-made and static (Jung uses the term "sign" to denote something static). Foss uses the term "metaphor" to denote the universal creative process that underlies human life and consciousness. In Foss's view, the metaphoric process of life is a continuous, ongoing creative force that is always working to "move beyond" (and destroy) the static state of the symbol. The metaphoric wants to create anew.

His writings can also be compared with the writings of Martin Heidegger and Pierre Teilhard de Chardin, both of whom are well known for their views on process philosophy which describes the universe as a process, rather than a fixed state.

== Major publications ==
- Essay. Logos, XII (1924)
- Essay. Logos, XIII (1925)
- The Idea of Perfection in the Western World (1946). New Jersey: Princeton University Press
- Symbol and Metaphor in Human Experience (1949). New Jersey: Princeton University Press
- Logic and Existence (1962). New York: Philosophical Library
- Death, Sacrifice and Tragedy (1966). New York: Philosophical Library
