= Folin =

Folin may refer to:

- Otto Folin (1867–1934), a Swedish-born American chemist
- Folin's reagent, a reagent to detect level of amines in amino acids
- Haut-Folin, the highest point in the region of Burgundy on France
- Léopold de Folin (1817–1896), a French oceanographer
- a suffix found in natural phenol names (as in punicafolin or taxifolin) to specify the leaf origin of the substance

== See also ==
- Follin (disambiguation)
- Fohlin
