= Frances Follin Jones =

American classicist and museum curator (1912–1999)

- Born: 1912
- Died: 1999 (aged 86–87); Haverford, PA

Frances Follin Jones (1912– February 13, 1999) was an American classicist and the former curator of collections at The Art Museum, Princeton University from 1943 to 1983.

== Biography ==
Jones studied classical archaeology at Bryn Mawr College, receiving her Bachelor's Degree in 1934. She participated in the excavation of the ancient city of Tarsus led by Hetty Goldman. In 1939, she became Goldman's assistant at the Institute for Advanced Study. Jones joined the staff of the Princeton University Art Museum in 1943. Because of gas rationing at the time, the director, Frank Jewett Mather, only visited Princeton once a week, so Jones was left essentially in charge. Jones became curator of Classical art in 1946. Her chapter on the pottery of the Tarsus dig was accepted as her dissertation from Bryn Mawr in 1952. She joined the Princeton archaeological expedition to Sicily in 1955 and 1959, and was a visiting member of excavations at Curium, Cyprus and Aphrodisias, Turkey. Jones was a correspondent of Fasti Archaeologici, a journal compilation of articles in archaeology, beginning in 1955. She was a founding editor of the Record of The Art Museum. Jones attended the monthly meetings of the Archaeology club, whose members included Dorothy Hill, Homer and Dorothy Thompson, Otto and Maria Weigert Brendel, and Evelyn Harrison. She was a founding member of Rei Cretariae Romanae Fautores, an international learned society specializing in Roman pottery. Jones was promoted to curator of collections at The Art Museum in 1971, and retired at age seventy in 1983.

== Published works ==
- Goldman, Hetty et al. "Hellenistic and Roman Pottery from Tarsus." Excavations at Gözlü Kule, Tarsus, Princeton Univ. Press, Princeton, NJ, 1950.
- Record of The Art Museum
- Ancient Art in the Art Museum, Princeton University
