= Peter Y. Solmssen =

American business executive

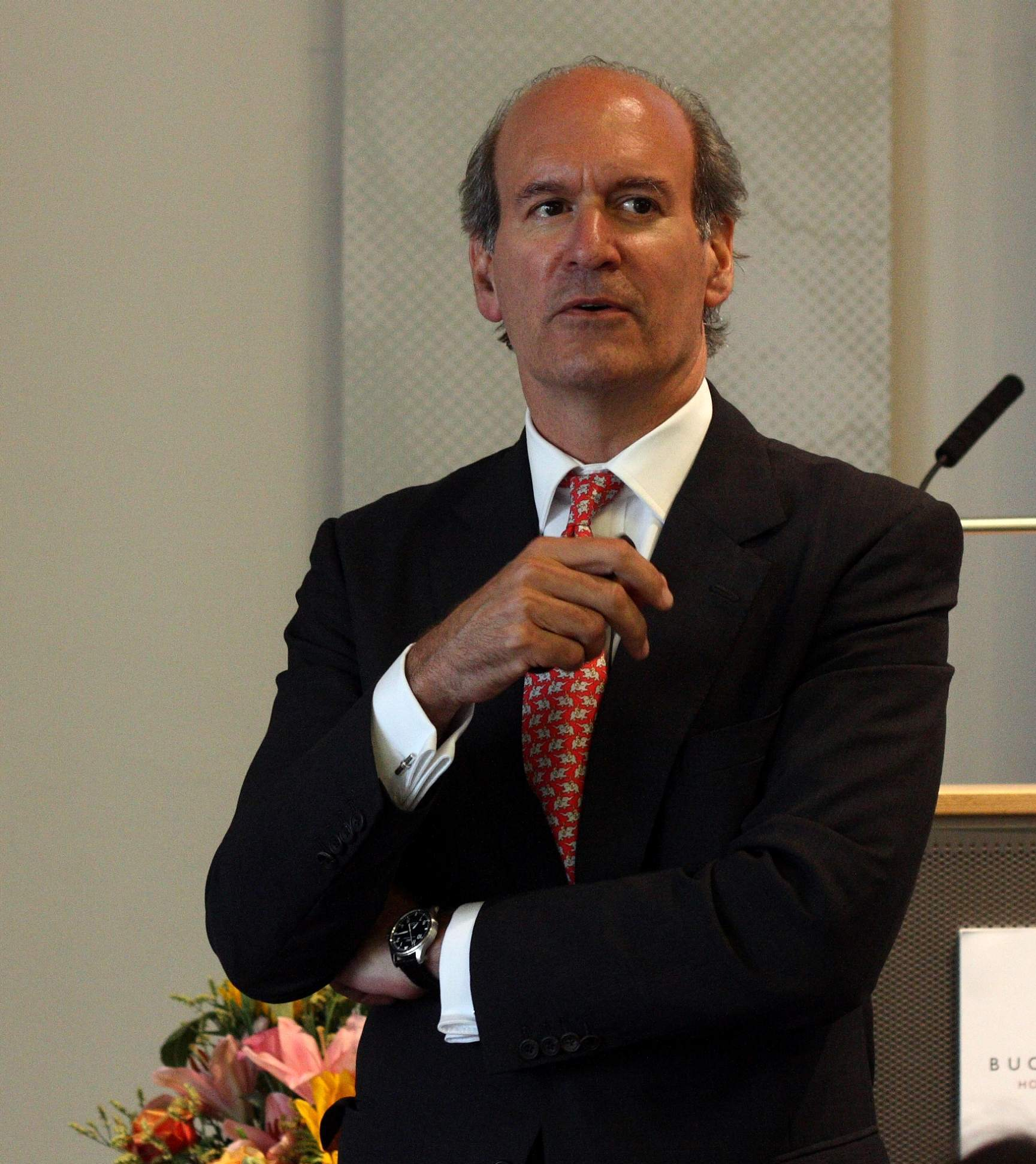
- Peter Solmssen at Bucerius Law School, 2013
- Born: Peter Y. Solmssen; January 22, 1955 (age 71); Philadelphia, Pennsylvania, US
- Education: Harvard University; University of Pennsylvania
- Occupations: lawyer, business executive
- Known for: Having negotiated simultaneous settlements of the Siemens corruption prosecutions and for leading a global campaign against bribery.
- Spouse: Sarah Elizabeth McCarty (married 1981)
- Children: Three
- Parent(s): Arthur R.G. Solmssen; Marsha Moffat York Solmssen
- Awards: Knox Fellowship

Peter Y. Solmssen (born in 1955 in Philadelphia, Pennsylvania) is an American lawyer and business executive who served as general counsel of Siemens AG, the German engineering company, until November 2013. Solmssen was the first American member of its managing board (Vorstand), and was also responsible for the company's operations in North and South America. Solmssen is best known for having negotiated the first internationally coordinated settlement of multiple foreign bribery prosecutions and for leading a global campaign against bribery. That work began during his tenure at Siemens and continues. He co-authored a Report to the Secretary General of the OECD entitled On Combating Corruption and Fostering Integrity (March 2017), and together with Tina Soreide, founded and led a network of lawyers, academics, NGOs and former and serving prosecutors called the Recommendation 6 Network. The Network’s mission was completed when the OECD published its Recommendation of the Council for Further Combating Bribery of Foreign Public Officials in International Business Transactions, which implemented virtually all of the provisions suggested by the Network. He serves as Chairman of the Non-trial Resolutions Subcommittee of the International Bar Association.

== Education ==
Solmssen graduated in 1972 cum laude from The Episcopal Academy in Merion, Pennsylvania, and magna cum laude from Harvard University in 1976, where he won a Knox Fellowship to attend Oxford University. He earned his JD cum laude in 1980 from the University of Pennsylvania School of Law in Philadelphia, where he was articles editor of the University of Pennsylvania Law Review. After graduation, Solmssen served for two years as law clerk to Federal District Court Judge Clarence C. Newcomer in the Eastern District of Pennsylvania, from 1980 to 1982.

== Career ==
=== Ballard, Spahr, Andrews, & Ingersoll ===
After his clerkship, Solmssen joined the law firm Ballard, Spahr, Andrews & Ingersoll as an associate. His first assignment was on the defense team advising the Dan River Corporation which was resisting a hostile, all-cash tender offer from companies controlled by Carl Icahn. Solmssen was part of the team that devised a successful defense, based on a novel application of the Investment Company Act of 1940. Ballard had a small office in Frankfurt, Germany, and the partner in charge soon discovered that Solmssen spoke German. Solmssen became more and more involved in the transnational corporate practice, until he was running a growing German corporate practice. Solmssen was elected a partner of Ballard, Spahr, Andrews & Ingersoll in 1988 at the same time as his wife, the first married lawyers to be elected partners at Ballard.

=== Morgan, Lewis & Bockius ===
In 1989, the Philadelphia law firm Morgan, Lewis & Bockius became one of the first international U.S. firms to open an office in West Germany. The firm recruited Solmssen from Ballard at that time to run its Frankfurt office.

=== General Electric ===
General Electric Company, one of his clients, hired Solmssen in 1998 as corporate vice president and general counsel of GE Plastics. In 2002 Solmssen became general counsel of GE Healthcare. While there he helped negotiate the company's acquisitions of Instrumentarium oy and Amersham plc, among others. He also initiated ground-breaking collective action in the diagnostic imaging industry which culminated in the NEMA (National Electrical Manufacturers Association) Code. Under the NEMA Code sales and marketing practices which could have been considered suspect under the anti-kickback laws of many countries were ended or sharply curtailed.

=== Siemens ===
In the summer of 2007 Solmssen became general counsel and a managing board member of Siemens AG. Solmssen was the first American to serve on the Siemens board. Siemens was in the early stages of a corruption scandal which had commenced in Munich and quickly spread to other countries, endangering the company's survival. In May 2007 the company had replaced its CEO with the first outsider in its history, Peter Löscher, who had been a senior executive at Amersham. Solmssen and Löscher knew each other from working together at GE. Löscher's first priority was cleaning up the corruption scandal and asked Solmssen to lead that effort. As the new general counsel at Siemens, Solmssen faced the unusual challenge of rebuilding a compliance function that the bribery scandal had exposed as not only weak but sometimes corrupt.

Solmssen and Löscher undertook an intense effort to resolve outstanding cases, change the culture, redesign compliance processes and make adherence to law and ethics a critical part of performance appraisals. To help address integrity issues in the future, a newly energised CCO and compliance function was established. The corruption scandal, which began with a raid on the Siemens AG headquarters by over two hundred German police and investigators in November 2006 was concluded in December 2008 in a simultaneous settlement with the Munich public prosecutors office, the United States Department of Justice and the United States Securities and Exchange Commission. On the same day, Siemens AG was confirmed as a "responsible contractor," i.e. eligible to bid on government contracts, by the United States government. In the course of the investigations and settlement Siemens paid fines and incurred expenses exceeding $2.5 billion, but avoided much greater fines and debarment from governmental procurement programs around the world. For the first time in the history of the enforcement of the Foreign Corrupt Practices Act, the United States Department of Justice recommended penalties lower than those prescribed by federal sentencing guidelines. Also for the first time, the Department approved the appointment of a compliance monitor who was not an American lawyer, an innovation suggested by Solmssen. The appointment of Theo Waigel, the former Finance Minister of Germany who had been recruited by Solmssen, was groundbreaking and an important component of the successful implementation of the Siemens compliance program.

As a consequence of the settlements achieved with various enforcement agencies around the world, Solmssen became a leader in international efforts to combat corruption. Under his direction, a monetary settlement with the World Bank was organized as a global campaign to combat corruption pursuant to which Siemens committed to funding anti-corruption initiatives around the world. He led successful efforts at the World Economic Forum and the G20 to keep corruption high on the global policy agenda, and drove increased corporate participation in "collective action" to combat corruption.

Solmssen was also the Siemens board member responsible for its business in North and South America. He appointed new CEOs all of the countries in his region of responsibility, moved Siemens USA's headquarters from New York to Washington, DC, dramatically heightened Siemens' visibility, and promoted better relations with the US government. Despite having admitted to massive corruption in 2008, Siemens was referred to by President Barack Obama in two successive State of the Union addresses for its commitment to vocational education and support for increased infrastructure focus. Solmssen resigned from Siemens AG shortly after Peter Löscher left the company.

=== AIG ===
In October 2016, Solmssen replaced Tom Russo as EVP and General Counsel of AIG, heading up the global legal, compliance, and regulatory functions. He led the regulatory team that enabled the end of AIG's SIFI designation. When AIG's CEO Peter Hancock resigned in 2017, Solmssen soon followed, returning to his farm in New Mexico.

== Personal ==
Solmssen is the eldest son of author and attorney Arthur R. G. Solmssen and Marsha Moffat Solmssen. He is married to Sarah Elizabeth McCarty Solmssen, formerly a partner at Ballard, Spahr, Andrews, & Ingersoll. The couple have three children.
