= Willy Dreyfus =

Swiss banker (1885–1977)

Willy Dreyfus (born 24 March 1885 in Frankfurt am Main; died 12 January 1977 in Montreux) was a Swiss banker of German-Jewish origin.

== Life ==
Willy Dreyfus, son of partner Isaac Dreyfus (1848-1909) and grandson of the founder of the banking house J. Dreyfus & Co. with branches in Frankfurt and Berlin, Jacques Dreyfus-Jeidels (1826-1890), completed an apprenticeship in the family business in Berlin and London. After his father's death in 1909, he took over management. Active in the banking department of the German General Government in Brussels, he worked with Hjalmar Schacht, Hans Fürstenberg and Paul von Mendelssohn-Bartholdy, among others.

From 1924 onwards, Dreyfus brokered significant foreign loans for the German Reich and German industrial companies through his contacts with British as well as U.S. banks. He was a member of the board of the Jewish Community of Berlin and, from 1927, vice president of the Benefit Society of German Jews (Hilfsvereins der deutschen Juden).

When the Nazis came to power in 1933, Dreyfus was persecuted as a Jew. His bank was Aryanized, that is transferred to non-Jewish owners in 1937 (Frankfurt branch) and 1938 (Berlin branch).

Dreyfus emigrated with his family to Switzerland in 1938. He attempted to recover some of the property looted by Nazis.

Willy Dreyfus, who died in 1977 at the age of 91, was the younger brother of the neurologist Georg Ludwig Dreyfus, who had already emigrated to Switzerland in 1933.

== Art collection ==
Dreyfus collected art. and manuscripts.

== Writings ==
- Bankwesen und Bankpolitik, Teubner, 1924
- Wirtschaftswende: Betrachtungen zur finanziellen Gesundung des Kontinents, Europa Verlag, 1945

== Literature ==
- Walther Killy und Rudolf Vierhaus (Hrsg.): Deutsche Biographische Enzyklopädie. Band 2. K.G. Saur Verlag GmbH & Co. KG, München 1996, ISBN 3-598-23163-6, Seite 620.
- Köhler, Ingo (2005). Die "Arisierung" der Privatbanken im Dritten Reich : Verdrängung, Ausschaltung und die Frage der Wiedergutmachung. München: Beck. ISBN 3-406-53200-4. OCLC 61386413.
- Werner Röder, Werner; Herbert A. Strauss, (Hrsg.), Biographisches Handbuch der deutschsprachigen Emigration nach 1933 Bd. 1: Politik, Wirtschaft, Öffentliches Leben, München 1980. S. 138
