= Otto Brendel =

German art historian and classical archaeologist

- Born: October 10, 1901; Erlangen, Germany
- Died: October 8, 1973 (aged 71); New York City
- Education: Heidelberg University
- Employer(s): Washington University in St. Louis; Indiana University Bloomington; Columbia University

Otto Johannes Brendel (October 10, 1901 in Erlangen, Germany – October 8, 1973 in New York City) was a German art historian and scholar of Etruscan art and archaeology.

== Biography ==
In 1928, he received his Ph.D. from the Heidelberg University under Ludwig Curtius on the topic of Roman iconography of the Augustan period. While at Heidelberg, Brendel studied with many notable scholars, including Franz Boll, E. Wayne Craven, Alfred von Domaszewski, Friedrich Karl von Duhn, Richard Carl Meister, Eugen Täubler, the literary theorist Ernst Robert Curtius, Friedrich Gundolf, Karl Jaspers, and the classical art historians Karl Lehmann and Friedrich Zimmer. He emigrated to the United States in 1938.

In the United States, he taught at Washington University in St. Louis from 1938 to 1941 and Indiana University Bloomington from 1941 to 1956. From 1949 to 1951, Brendel was at the American Academy in Rome, first under a Prix de Rome and then with a Fulbright Fellowship. In 1956, he became Professor of Art History and Archaeology at Columbia University, and became emeritus in 1963, continuing to teach until his retirement in June 1973. He died that September. At the time of his death he had written the manuscript for the Pelican History of Art volume on Etruscan Art. It was completed posthumously by Emeline Hill Richardson, and published in 1978. His work Prolegomena to the Study of Roman Art represents a notable scholarly approach to the historiography of Roman art. Otto's wife Maria arranged to have many of his unfinished works published after his death.

One of Brendel's students was Larissa Bonfante. Brendel married Maria Weigert Brendel (1902–1994) in 1929. Brendel's daughter Cornelia Brendel Foss was married to American composer Lukas Foss.

== Bibliography ==
- Brendel, Otto (1931). Ikonographie des Kaisers (dissertation). Heidelberg, Germany.
- "Prolegomena to the Study of Roman Art." Memoirs of the American Academy in Rome 21 (1953): 7-73, revised and reprinted separately as Prolegomena to the Study of Roman Art. New Haven, CT: Yale University Press, 1979.
- Etruscan Art. Pelican History of Art 43. New York: Penguin Books, 1978, 2nd ed, New Haven: Yale University Press, 1995. ISBN 9780300064469.
- The Visible Idea: Interpretations of Classical Art. Washington, DC: Decatur House, 1980.
- Ikonographie des Kaisers Augustus. 1931.
- "Symbolik der Kugel." Mitteilungen des Deutschen Archaeologischen Instituts, Roemische Abteilung 51 (1936): 1-95, reprinted as Symbolism of the Sphere: a Contribution to the History of Earlier Greek philosophy. Leiden: Brill, 1977.
- "Classicism in Roman architecture." Journal of the Society of Architectural Historians 29 (October 1970): 264.
- "Borrowings from ancient art in Titian." Art Bulletin 37 (June 1955): 113–25.
