= 2036 Danish Bible translation =

Danish translation of the Bible

The 2036 Danish Bible translation will be an authorised (by the Church of Denmark) translation of the Christian Bible into the Danish language.

== Background ==
Prior to the Danish Reformation, only a few biblical writings had been translated into Danish. The most extensive was the Gammeldansk Bibel written c. 1480 and translating the first 12 books of the Bible from the Latin Vulgate into Middle Danish. The translation was a difficult process resulting in a mix of literal translation and interpretation. During the 20th century, as modern Biblical criticism and biblical exegesis interpretations gained favor, new linguistic and archaeological understandings expanded the understanding of the original Hebrew and Greek sources. This resulted in a shift in translation philosophy and new Danish translations of the Old Testament in 1931 and New Testament in 1948. The latest edition in this tradition is the Church of Denmark's Danish Authorized Version of 1992 completed by the Danish Bible Society. The Danish Contemporary Bible 2020 was published in 2020, with more modern language in an attempt to appeal to young and secular readers. This version was also criticised.

== History ==
On 19 January 2023, the Danish Bible Society announced a "new and updated version" of the Bible to be published in 2036, stating that "the goal of the new version is for it to be written in updated language that is more relevant to the times." The work began "in earnest" in May 2024, when the Bible Society presented its two editorial staff members, one for each of the Old and New Testaments, as well as the principles for the new translation. Apart from theologians and linguists, the three fiction writers Anne-Cathrine Riebnitzsky, Rakel Haslund-Gjerrild and Ursula Andkjær Olsen were also among the staff. The general secretary of the Bible Society explained this by stating that the authors were "colossally good at Danish." The year 2036 corresponds to the 500th anniversary of the Protestant Reformation in Denmark (1517 in Germany). Mogens Müller published a book in 2024 entitled Tilløb til Bibelen 2036 about the different considerations involved in translating the Bible into Danish.

On 21 May 2025, the Society released its first draft translations. These were translations of Genesis, Song of Songs, the Gospel of Mark and the Epistle to the Philippians.

== Principles of revision ==
=== Draft translations and criticism ===
As a principle, the Bible Society will continuously release draft translations of individual books of the 66-book Lutheran canon throughout the process. This is intended to ensure public debate and allow the public to have a say in the translation.

In May 2025, parish pastor Carsten Mulnæs criticised the new translation, particularly the rendering of "τὸ σῶμά" (NRSV: body) from Dette er mit legme to Det er min krop, invoking the central distinction between these two terms in the theology of Niels Grønkjær and stating that one would not say krop during church services. OT editor-in-chief Søren Holst responded to part of Mulnæs' criticism, writing that the translation team was not responsible for liturgical oral use, that being a decision for bishops.

On 18 February 2026, theologian Jesper Tang Nielsen criticised the draft translation for removing the linguistic characteristics of Mark. On 25 February 2026, Weekendavisen, and later also Kristeligt Dagbad, reported that the N. F. S. Grundtvig-associated Grundtvigian faction of the Church of Denmark, which opposes biblical inerrancy and infallibility, had emerged as one of the fiercest critics of the translation, finding Mark to sound too much like an actual historical account.

On 3 March 2026, Kristeligt Dagblad reported that translators were not permitted to publicly comment on or criticise the translation of the books they themselves were translating. to this, Jesper Tang Nielsen left the project later that same month. On 4 April, the Society rescinded this policy. Author Bjørn Bredal published a series of commentary on the translation in Politiken.

=== Trampolindugen ===
The Bible Society has used the Trampolindugen (the Trampoline Mat) as a metaphor for the four translation principles, meaning that trial translations "are stretched between four springs": the source language, modern Danish, church tradition, and contemporary usage.

One of the goals was also a greater focus on women, with Paul in the Epistle to the Philippians greeting both "sisters and brothers", although only "brothers" appears in the original text.
