= Cornelia Foss =

American painter (born 1931)

- Born: 1931 (age 94–95); Berlin, Germany
- Occupations: Painter, teacher
- Years active: 1959–present
- Notable work: Glenn Gould portraits
- Spouse: Lukas Foss (m. 1951; died 2009)
- Partner(s): Glenn Gould (1968–1972)
- Children: 2 (including Eliza Foss Topol)
- Parents: Otto Brendel; Maria Weigert Brendel
- Awards: Member, National Academy of Design (2009)
- Website: https://www.corneliafoss.net/

Cornelia Foss (born Cornelia Brendel, 1931) is an American artist and teacher. Her work is in the permanent collections of The National Portrait Gallery, The Houston Museum of Art, The Guild Hall Museum, The Brooklyn Museum, The Wichita Art Museum, The Museum of Oklahoma, The Burchfield Penney Art Center, The National Museum of Women in the Arts and The Huntington Museum.

== Early life and education ==
Cornelia Brendel was born in Berlin, Germany to art historian and archeologist parents, Otto Brendel and Maria Weigert Brendel. She immigrated to St. Louis, Missouri with her mother in 1939 to escape Nazi persecution. Her father had preceded them to St. Louis. She studied literature at Indiana University and art history at the Sapienza University of Rome.

== Career ==
Foss, a painter, maintains studios in New York, NY and Bridgehampton, NY. Her work is in the collections of the National Portrait Gallery, The Houston Museum of Art, Guild Hall of East Hampton, The Brooklyn Museum, The Wichita Art Museum, The Museum of Oklahoma, The Burchfield Penney Art Center, The National Museum of Women in the Arts and The Huntington Museum. She was elected as a member of the National Academy of the Arts in 2009.

Foss teaches painting at the Art Students League of New York.

== Personal life ==
In 1951, Brendel married musician and composer, Lukas Foss. They had two children, Christopher Brendel Foss, who became a documentary filmmaker and corporate consultant on social and environmental engagement/sustainability communications, and Eliza Foss Topol, an actress. The couple were separated from 1968 to 1972. During this time, Foss moved with her children to Toronto to be closer to her lover, pianist Glenn Gould. The story of the affair was featured in the 2009 documentary. Genius Within: The Inner Life of Glenn Gould. Foss returned to New York and her husband in 1972. They remained married until his death in 2009.

== See also ==
- Glenn Gould
- Lukas Foss
- American Impressionism
- Women artists
- Art Students League of New York
- Smithsonian American Art Museum
