= Todd Walton =

American novelist

Todd Walton (born October 17, 1949) is an American novelist.

== Early life and education ==
Walton graduated from Woodside High School. He attended the University of California, Santa Cruz from 1967 to 1969 and was a laborer and musician from 1969 to 1971.

== Published fiction ==
Todd published his first short story in 1972 in the Santa Cruz weekly Sundaz. He sold his first short story "Willow" in 1975 to Cosmopolitan magazine.

After publishing several stories in Cosmopolitan, Seventeen, Young Miss, and Gallery, Doubleday published Walton's first novel Inside Moves, which inspired an eponymous motion picture in 1980. The film, with a screenplay by Valerie Curtin and Barry Levinson, was directed by Richard Donner and starred John Savage, David Morse, and Diana Scarwid, who received an Academy Award nomination for Best Supporting Actress for her portrayal of Louise. A DVD of the film was released in 2011, and Walton appeared as part of the Special Features.

Walton's novel Forgotten Impulses was published in 1980 by Simon & Schuster and was chosen by The New York Times as one of the best novels of that year. Louie & Women was published by Dutton in 1983, and Night Train was published by Mercury House in 1986. Bantam published Todd's fifth novel, Ruby & Spear, in 1996. Walton's fable Of Water and Melons was published by Red Wing Press in 1999. Buddha in a Teacup: Tales of Enlightenment was published through Lost Coast Press in 2008 and won the American Indie Award, the Bay Area Independent Publishers Award and a Silver Nautilus Award. Under the Table Books was published by Lost Coast in 2009 and won the Bay Area Independent Publishers Award and the American Indie Award.

== Published non-fiction ==
Open Body: Creating Your Own Yoga was published by Avon in 1998. In May 2000, Ten Speed Press published The Writer's Path, a book of Walton's original writing exercises, co-written with Mindy Toomay. Walton was a regular contributor to The Sacramento News & Review from 1984 to 1995. He currently resides in Mendocino, California and contributes commentaries and short stories to The Anderson Valley Advertiser.

== Spoken Word ==
Audio versions of Walton's work include Inside Moves, Louie & Women, Buddha in a Teacup, Under the Table Books, and Ruby & Spear. Walton performs his short stories on three CDs: I Steal My Bicycle and other stories, Ten Stories from Buddha in a Teacup, and I Remember You.

== Music ==
"When Light Is Your Garden", a CD of nine songs created by Walton and cellist Marcia Sloane, was released in 2009 and "So Not Jazz", also with Marcia Sloane, was released in 2010. Walton has released three albums of piano music: "43 Short Piano Improvisations" (2011), "Ceremonies" (2011), and "Mystery Inventions" (2012).

In Spring 2013, Inside Moves was reissued in paperback with an introduction by Sherman Alexie.
