= Georg Solmssen =

German banker

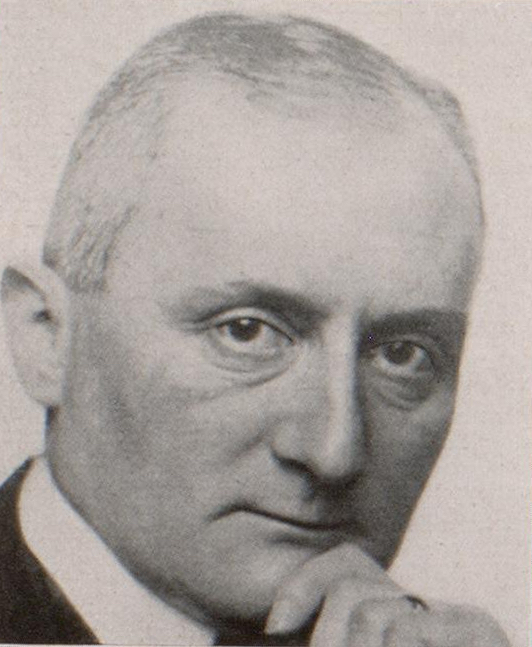
- Solmssen in 1928
- Born: Georg Salomonsoh; 7 August 1869; Berlin, German Empire
- Died: 10 January 1957 (aged 87); Lugano, Switzerland
- Occupations: Banker; lawyer
- Spouse: Giulietta Aselmeyer (m. 1907)
- Children: 3
- Father: Adolph Salomonsohn
- Relatives: Abraham Gedalia (great-great-grandfather); Arthur Salomonsohn (uncle); Maria Weigert Brendel (cousin); Arthur R.G. Solmssen (first cousin, twice removed)

Georg Solmssen (né Salomonsohn; 7 August 1869 – 10 January 1957) was a German banker and lawyer.

== Life ==
Georg Salomonsoh was born on 7 August 1869 in Berlin, German Empire (present-day, Germany) to Adolph Salomonsohn, a banker, and Sara Rinkel (1851–1929).

Through his father Solmssen was the great-grandson of Rabbi Salomon Abraham Gedalia (1776–1844) and the great-great-grandson of Rabbi Abraham Gedalia, the Chief Rabbi of Denmark. Solmssen was the paternal nephew of the banker Arthur Salomonsohn, cousin of the classical archaeologist and art historian Maria Weigert Brendel and the first cousin, twice removed (Note: Also cited as the nephew of) of the American writer Arthur R.G. Solmssen. Solmssen was one of four siblings.

He studied German law. Solmssen worked from 1900 for German bank Disconto-Gesellschaft in Berlin. He was a member of the supervisory board of German company Lufthansa AG and German company Vereinigte Stahlwerke.

In 1933, Solmssen was for a short time the speaker of the management board for German bank Deutsche Bank, which took over Disconto-Gesellschaft in 1929. He lived in the 1920s on the island of Schwanenwerder. When the Nazis came to power, Solmssen left Germany and emigrated to Switzerland.

== Personal life ==
In 1900, Solmssen converted from Judaism to Protestant Christianity and changed his surname from Salomonsohn to Solmssen.

In 1907, Solmssen married Giulietta 'Etta' Aselmeyer (1884–1971), with whom he had 3 children.

Solmssen died on 10 January 1957 in Lugano, Switzerland aged 87.

== Literature ==
- Berlin-Brandenburgischen Akademie der Wissenschaften (ed.): Acta Borussica. Neue Folge, Reihe 1: Die Protokolle des Preußischen Staatsministeriums 1817–1934/38. Band 12, 2: Reinhold Zilch, Bärbel Holtz: April 4, 1925 until May 10, 1938. Olms-Weidmann, Hildesheim u. a. 2004, ISBN 3-487-12704-0, p. 702.
- Gerald D. Feldman: Jewish bankers and the crises of the Weimar Republic (= Leo Baeck Memorial Lecture. 39, ZDB-ID 415081-8). Leo Baeck Institute, New York NY 1995.
- Harold James, Martin L. Müller (Hrsg.): Georg Solmssen – ein deutscher Bankier. Briefe aus einem halben Jahrhundert 1900–1956 (= Schriftenreihe zur Zeitschrift für Unternehmensgeschichte. 25). Herausgegeben im Auftrag der Historischen Gesellschaft der Deutschen Bank e.V. C. H. Beck, Munich 2012, ISBN 978-3-406-62795-8.
