= Danish Contemporary Bible 2020 =

2020 Danish translation of the Christian bible

- Full name: Bibelen 2020
- Language: Danish
- Complete Bible published: 2020
- Copyright: 2020 by the Danish Bible Society
- Genesis 1:1–3 I begyndelsen skabte Gud himlen og jorden. Dengang var alt rungende tomt, og der var buldrende mørkt over dybet. Men Gud lod sit åndedræt blæse over vandet. Han sagde: »bliv lys!« og straks kom der lys. John 3:16 Gud elskede nemlig verden så højt, at han ofrede sin eneste søn for, at den, der tror på ham, ikke skal dø men få evigt liv.

Danish Contemporary Bible 2020 (Danish: Bibelen 2020) is a Bible translation into Danish which attracted controversy for its nonliteral translations and omitting some references to Israel. In particular, it changed references in The New Testament from "Israel" to "the Jewish people" where the latter was meant, ostensibly because most secular readers understand "Israel" as referring to the land of Israel and not the people of Israel. Other references to Jewish people are changed to refer to all of mankind. However, direct references to the land of Israel and its kings were preserved in the translation. And "Israel" and "Israelites" are mentioned more than 2000 times in the Danish Contemporary Bible 2020. Philologos wrote that the translation rejects replacement theology. And, the Danish Israel Mission concludes that "... this translation does not promote or express replacement theology, or antisemitic or anti-Israel sentiment. Quite the opposite, in fact."

The language was also modernized in other areas to accommodate younger, secular readers who are not familiar with the Bible, or with theological or agricultural terminology.
