= Abraham Gedalia =

Chief Rabbi of Denmark (1793–1827)

- אברהם גדליה
- Title: Chief Rabbi of Denmark

Personal life
- Born: 1752 Poland
- Died: November 8, 1827 (aged 74–75) Copenhagen, Denmark

Religious life
- Religion: Judaism

Jewish leader
- Predecessor: Abraham Gedalia Levin
- Successor: Abraham Wolff
- Synagogue: Læderstræde Synagogue
- Began: 1793
- Ended: 1827

Abraham Gedalia (1752–1827; Hebrew: אברהם גדליה) was the Chief Rabbi of Denmark in the late 18th and early 19th century.

== Biography ==
Gedalia was born in Poland, where his father, Abraham Gedalia Levin was a rabbi. Gedalia followed in his father's footsteps, becoming a rabbi in Gniezno, Poland. In 1782, Gedalia moved to Copenhagen to join his father who had been appointed chief rabbi of Denmark in 1779. After serving as Levin's assistant for several years, Gedalia was named deputy rabbi in 1787.

After his father's death in 1793, Gedalia was named chief rabbi. His 34 years as the leader of Jews in Denmark were marked by the Copenhagen Fire of 1795, which destroyed the congregation's Læderstræde Synagogue, leaving the city's Jews to worship in homes and private synagogues. Gedalia was known for his Talmudic learning and honorable conduct, but he was regarded as "old fashioned" by reform-oriented Danish Jews. As late as 1796, Gedalia had opposed Jews learning Danish.

When Gedalia died in 1827, an attempt was made to install his son, Salomon, as his successor, but Abraham Wolff was appointed instead.
