= Avraham Barkai =

German-born Israeli historian (1921–2020)

Avraham Barkai (1921 in Berlin – 29 February 2020 in Kibbutz Lehavot HaBashan) was a German-born Israeli historian and researcher of antisemitism. He died at age 99 on 29 February 2020 in Lehavot HaBashan.

== Publications ==
- Barkai, Avraham. From Boycott to Annihilation: The Economic Struggle of German Jews, 1933-1943. The Tauber Institute for the Study of European Jewry series, 11. Hanover NH: Published for Brandeis University Press by University Press of New England, 1989. ISBN 978-0-87451-490-2 (held in over 400 US libraries according to WorldCat) translation of his Vom Boykott zur "Entjudung".
- Barkai, Avraham. Nazi Economics: Ideology, Theory, and Policy. New Haven: Yale University Press, 1990. ISBN 978-0-87451-490-2 (held in over 500 US libraries according to WorldCat) (translation of his Wirtschaftssystem des Nationalsozialismus.)
- Barkai, Avraham. Branching Out: German-Jewish Immigration to the United States, 1820-1914. Ellis Island series. New York: Holmes & Meier, 1994. ISBN 978-0-8419-1152-9 (held in over 350 US libraries according to WorldCat)
- Barkai, Avraham, and Schoschanna Barkai-Lasker. Jüdische Minderheit und Industrialisierung: Demographie, Berufe, und Einkommem der Juden in Westdeutschland 1850-1914. Schriftenreihe wissenschaftlicher Abhandlungen des Leo Baeck Instituts, Bd. 46. Tübingen: J.S.B. Mohr (P. Siebeck), 1988. ISBN 978-3-16-745315-5
- Barkai, Avraham. "Wehr dich!": der Centralverein deutscher Staatsbürger jüdischen Glaubens (C.V.) 1893-1938. München: Beck, 2002.ISBN 9783406495229
- Barkai, Avraham. Hoffnung und Untergang: Studien zur deutsch-jüdischen Geschichte des 19. und 20. Jahrhunderts. Hamburger Beiträge zur Sozial- und Zeitgeschichte, Bd. 36. Hamburg: Christians, 1998. ISBN 978-3-7672-1316-6
- Barkai, Avraham. "Das Wirtschaftssystem des Nationalsozialismus: der historische und ideologische Hintergrund, 1933-1936". Koln: Verlag Wissenschaft und Politik, c1977. ISBN 3-8046-8535-8
- Barkai, Avraham. Vom Boykott zur "Entjudung": der wirtschaftliche Existenzkampf der Juden im Dritten Reich, 1933-1943. Frankfurt am Main : Fischer, 1988. ISBN 3-596-24368-8
- Barkai, Avraham. Jüdische Minderheit und Industrialisierung : Demographie, Berufe, und Einkommem der Juden in Westdeutschland 1850-1914. Tübingen : J.S.B. Mohr (P. Siebeck), 1988. ISBN 3-16-745315-X
- Barkai, Avraham. Oscar Wassermann und die Deutsche Bank : Bankier in schwierigen Zeiten. München: Beck, c2005. ISBN 3-406-52958-5 (cl.)
