= Ludwig Curtius =

German classical archeologist

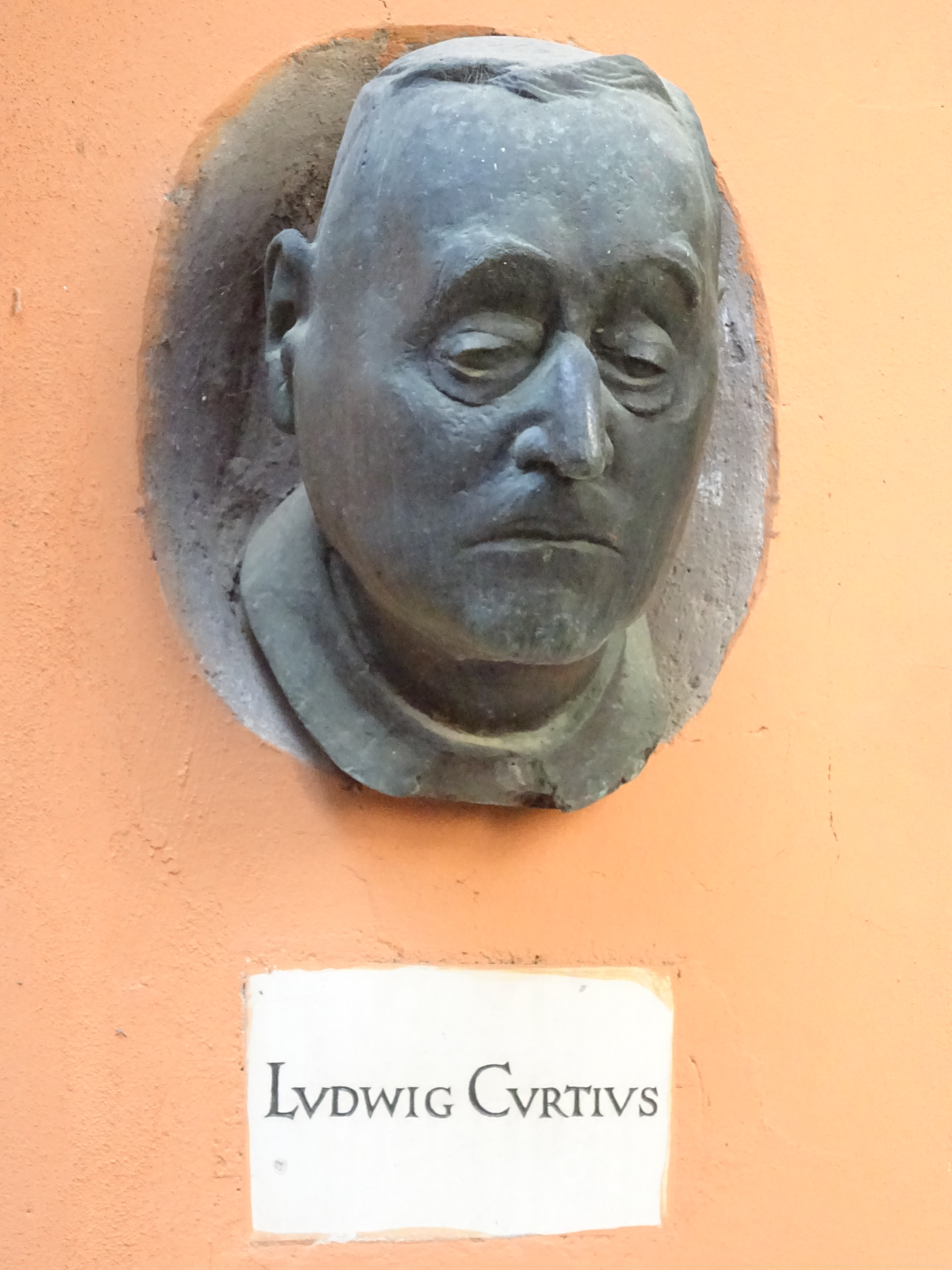
Ludwig Curtius Portrait

Ludwig Curtius (December 13, 1874 – April 10, 1954) was a German archaeologist born in Augsburg. He is remembered for his investigations involving the development of ancient Greek and Roman art.

He studied classical archaeology in Munich under Adolf Furtwängler (1853–1907), of whom in 1899 he became tutor to Furtwängler's son, future famed conductor Wilhelm Furtwängler (1886–1954). From 1904 to 1907 Curtius participated in excavations at Aegina and Hattusa, afterwards becoming an associate professor at the University of Erlangen, where in 1913 he became professor ordinarius.

During World War I, he received the rank of lieutenant and served as a news officer in the Balkans. After the war, he taught classes at the University of Freiburg (from 1918) and later at the University of Heidelberg (from 1920). In 1928 he was appointed director at the Deutsches Archäologisches Institut (German Archaeological Institute, DAI) in Rome, a position he kept until his dismissal by the Nazis in 1938. After his release from the DAI, he remained in Rome until his death in 1954. He was buried in the Teutonic Cemetery.

Curtius was the author of a number of influential works on classical archaeology; among his better-written efforts are: Antike Kunst (Ancient Art), Das Antike Rom (Ancient Rome), and Die Wandmalerei Pompejis (The Wall Paintings of Pompeii).

== Sources ==
- Dictionary of Art Historians, biography
- Parts of this article are based on a translation of an equivalent article at the German Wikipedia.
