= Arthur R.G. Solmssen =

American writer and lawyer (1928–2018)

- Born: September 29, 1928 New York City, U.S.
- Died: April 23, 2018 (aged 89) Bryn Mawr, Pennsylvania, U.S.
- Occupation: Lawyer; novelist
- Education: Harvard University (BA); University of Pennsylvania
- Children: 3, including Peter
- Relatives: Georg Solmssen (uncle)

Arthur R.G. Solmssen (September 29, 1928 in New York City – April 23, 2018, Bryn Mawr, Pennsylvania) was an American lawyer and novelist.

== History ==
Arthur R.G. Solmssen spent his early childhood in Berlin, and his adolescence and later youth in the suburbs of Philadelphia.

Solmssen was the grandson of Arthur Salomonsohn, nephew of Georg Solmssen and great-great-nephew of Adolph Salomonsohn. His ancestor was the German banker Joseph Mendelssohn. He studied at Harvard University, where he earned his Bachelor of Arts degree in 1950, and the University of Pennsylvania, where he completed his law degree in 1953. He was called to the Pennsylvania Bar in 1953 and commenced working as a lawyer in Philadelphia. His professional affiliation is Of Counsel to Saul Ewing LLP.

Solmssen published several novels, the most famous of which is A Princess in Berlin (1980). Solmssen received the Athenaeum Literary Award for the novel. A Princess in Berlin is a portrait of the early Weimar Republic, and has been the subject of multiple translations, such as Une princesse à Berlin, Éditions Robert Laffont, 1982. Solmssen's works are catalogued by the German National Library, among others.

The Comfort Letter, Solmssen's 1975 novel concerning ethics and assurances in public offerings, has been the subject of contemporary academic analysis in law.

Solmssen was a Fellow of the Salzburg Global Seminar, with which he maintained an active association.

He also wrote a book about German Luftwaffe pilot and general officer Ernst Udet.

Solmssen has three sons, Peter York Solmssen, Kurt A. Solmssen, and A.R.G. Solmssen Junior.

== Bibliography ==
- 1969 Rittenhouse Square (Hodder & Stoughton)
- 1971 Alexander's Feast
- 1975 The Comfort Letter (Little, Brown and Company)
- 1980 A Princess in Berlin (Little, Brown and Company)
- 1986 Takeover Time (Little, Brown and Company)
- 2000 The Wife of Shore: A Search
