= List of compositions by Charles Wuorinen =

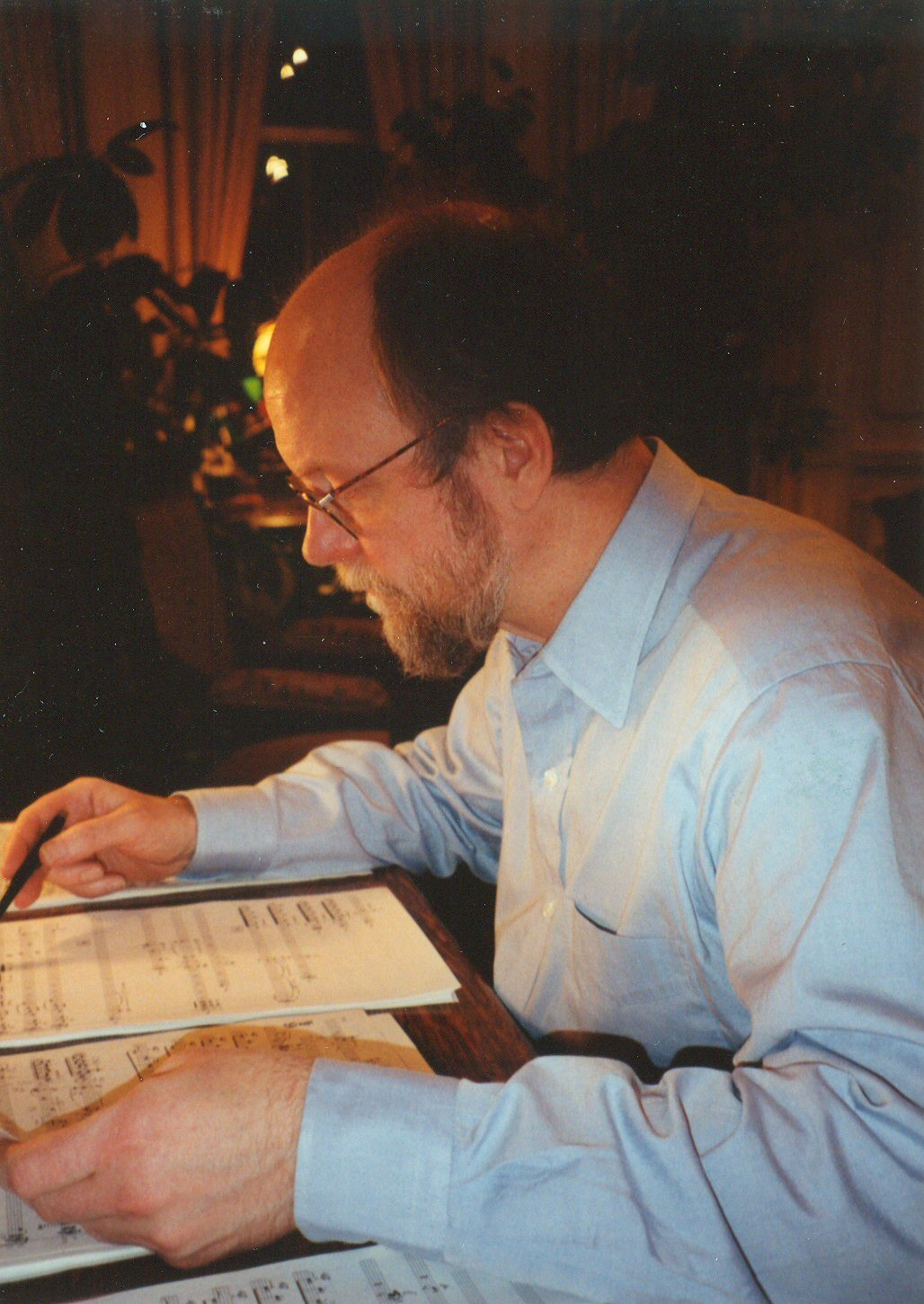
Charles Wuorinen, 1990s

The following is a reverse-chronological list of compositions by Charles Wuorinen.

== List ==
- Second Percussion Symphony – 2019
- Burlesque – 2018, for two pianos, for the American Contemporary Ballet, Los Angeles
- Sudden Changes – 2017, for Michael Tilson Thomas and the San Francisco Symphony
- Second String Trio – 2017, for the Goeyvaerts String Trio, Belgium
- Xenolith – 2017, duo for viola and percussion, for Lois Martin and Michael Truesdell
- Eros and Nemesis (symphonic poem after Brokeback Mountain) for orchestra, for James Levine – 2016
- Exsultet (Praeconium Paschale) for Francisco Núñez and the Young People's Chorus of New York City – 2015
- Brokeback Mountain (chamber version) – 2015
- Megalith – 2014, piano and 15 players, for Peter Serkin
- Doubletake – 2014, for Steven Beck
- Jan's Dowland – 2014, two Dowland works for solo harp
- Alphabetical Ashbery – texts of John Ashbery – 2013, for loadbang
- Electric Quartet – 2013, 4 electric guitars
- Zoe – 2013, string sextet
- Intrada – 2012, for Peter Serkin
- Cygnus – 2012, commissioned by the Cygnus Ensemble
- Brokeback Mountain – 2008–2012, an opera on the short story of Annie Proulx, with libretto by Proulx, commissioned by the Teatro Real, Madrid
- Intrada – 2012 for Peter Serkin
- Adagio – 2011, for Peter Serkin
- Etude (for Chords and Dynamic Balance) – 2011, commissioned by the Ferruccio Busoni International Piano Competition
- Big Spinoff – 2011, for 16 players
- Marian Tropes – 2010, for the Brentano String Quartet (on music of Dufay and Josquin)
- It Happens Like This, a dramatic cantata on poems of James Tate (writer) – 2010
- Oros – 2009, for Ursula Oppens
- The Haroun Piano Book – 2003/2009, premiered by Lynn Raley
- Marimba Variations – 2009 – commissioned by 22 percussionists
- Moon Clock – text of Donald Hall – 2009, premiered by Thomas Meglioranza, baritone and Peter Kolkay, bassoon
- Viola Variations – 2008, premiered by violist Lois Martin
- Trio for Flute, Bass Clarinet and Piano – 2008, premiered by the New York New Music Ensemble
- Metagong – 2008 – for two pianos and two percussionists – premiered by the New York New Music Ensemble
- Time Regained, a fantasy for piano and orchestra – 2008, premiered by the Metropolitan Opera Orchestra, James Levine conductor, Peter Serkin soloist
- Second Piano Quintet – 2008, premiered by the Brentano String Quartet and pianist Peter Serkin
- Ave Maria: Josquin – 2007, premiered by Tashi Quartet
- Christes Crosse: Morley – 2008, premiered by Tashi Quartet
- Scherzo – 2007, premiered by Peter Serkin
- Synaxis – 2007, premiered on the inaugural concert of the League ISCM Orchestra, Louis Karchin conducting, soloists: Timothy Cobb (contrabass), Patrick Pridemore (horn), Robert Ingliss (oboe), Alan R. Kay (clarinet)
- Fourth Piano Sonata – 2007, written for and premiered by Anne-Marie McDermott
- Eighth Symphony (Theologoumena) – 2006, premiered by the Boston Symphony Orchestra, James Levine conductor
- Spin 5 – 2006, for violin solo and 18 players, premiered by Jennifer Koh
- Iridule – 2006, for oboe and six players, premiered by Jacqueline Leclair, oboe and the New Millennium Ensemble
- Never Again the Same – text by James Tate (writer) – 2006, premiered by Wilbur Pauley, bass and Christopher Hall, tuba
- Eleven Short Pieces – 2006, premiered by Erik Carlson, violin and Michael Caterisano, vibraphone
- Praegustatum - 2005, for solo piano, written for James Levine.
- Flying to Kahani – 2005, premiered by Orchestra of St. Luke's, Roberto Abbado conductor, Peter Serkin soloist
- Heart Shadow – 2005, premiered by Bruce Levingston
- Theologoumenon – 2005, premiered by the Metropolitan Opera Orchestra, James Levine conductor
- Duo Sonata for Flute and Piano – 2004, premiered by Robert Aitken, flute and James Avery, piano
- Visible – text by Paul Auster – 2004, premiered by Mary S. Nessinger, mezzo-soprano and Mark Steinberg, violin
- Ashberyana – poems by John Ashbery – 2004, premiered by Leon Williams, baritone
- The Long Boat – poem by Stanley Kunitz – 2003, premiered by Mary S. Nessinger, mezzo-soprano and Jacqueline Leclair, English horn
- Dodecadactyl – 2003, premiered by William Anderson and Oren Fader, guitars
- Fourth Piano Concerto – 2003, premiered by the Boston Symphony Orchestra, James Levine conductor, Peter Serkin soloist
- The Haroun Songbook – 2002, premiered by Elizabeth Farnum, soprano; Emily Golden, mezzo-soprano; James Schaffner, tenor; Michael Chioldi, baritone; and Phillip Bush, piano
- Hexadactyl – 2002, premiered by William Anderson, guitar
- Josquiniana – 2002, written for and premiered by the Brentano String Quartet
- Fifty Fifty – 2002, premiered by pianists Rolf Hind and Nicholas Hodges
- Pentecost poem by Derek Walcott – 2002, premiered by William Ferguson, tenor and June Han, harp
- Fenton Songs II – 2002, text by James Fenton, premiered by Lucy Shelton
- September 11, 2001 – text by W. H. Auden – 2001, premiered by William Ferguson, tenor and Phillip Bush, piano
- Two Machine Portraits – poem by Les Murray, premiered by Ryan MacPherson, tenor and Marilyn Nonken, piano
- Haroun and the Sea of Stories – an opera with libretto by James Fenton, based on the novel by Salman Rushdie 1997–2001
- Andante Espressivo – 2001, premiered by cellist Fred Sherry and Wuorinen, piano
- Alap, a Prelude to Contrapunctus IX of the Art of Fugue – 2001, premiered by the Brentano String Quartet
- Stanzas Before Time – poem by John Ashbery – 2001, premiered by Neil Farrell, tenor and June Han, harp
- Buttons and Bows (or, Superparticular Variations) – 2001, premiered by Madeleine Shapiro, cello and Mikko Luoma, accordion
- Cyclops (2000) – 2001, premiered by the London Sinfonietta, Oliver Knussen conductor
- Fourth String Quartet – 1999, premiered by the Brentano String Quartet
- Brass Quintet – 1999, premiered at the June-in-Buffalo Festival
- An Orbicle of Jasp – 1999, premiered by cellist Fred Sherry and Wuorinen, piano
- Lepton – 1999, premiered by SurPlus, Freiburg
- Symphony Seven – 1997, premiered by the Toledo Symphony, Andrew Massey conductor
- Cello Variations III – 1997, premiered by cellist Fred Sherry
- Big Epithalamium – 1997, premiered by students at the Juilliard School
- Epithalamium – 1997, premiered by Christopher Gekker and Raymond Mase
- Fenton Songs (Version 1) – 1997, premiered by Elizabeth Farnum, Curtis Macomber, Fred Sherry and Wuorinen
- Fenton Songs (Version 2) – 1997, premiered by the Cygnus Ensemble, Phyllis Bryn-Julson soprano
- Variations for Orchestra, Op. 31 of Arnold Schoenberg: recast for two pianos for the New York City Ballet by Wuorinen (1996), premiered by the New York City Ballet, Cameron Grant and Richard Moredock pianos.
- The River of Light – the third part of the Dante trilogy for the New York City Ballet – 1996 – two versions: orchestral and chamber, premiered by the Buffalo Philharmonic, Wuorinen conducting
- Katz Fugue – 1996, premiered by James Winn, piano
- The Great Procession – the second part of the Dante trilogy for the New York City Ballet – 1995 – two versions: chamber (premiered by the New York New Music Ensemble, Wuorinen conducting) and orchestral (premiered by Deutsches-Sinfonie-Orchester, Berlin, Bradley Lubman conducting)
- Sonata for Guitar and Piano – 1995, premiered by William Anderson, guitar and Joan Forsyth, piano
- In Heated Sylvan Glades & With Elegiac Sackbuts – aria from The W.of Bablylon arranged for 2 sopranos and piano – 1995, premiered by Phyllis Bryn-Julson, Patricia Green, Mark Markham
- Lightenings VIII – poem by Seamus Heaney – 1994, premiered by Phyllis Bryn-Julson, soprano and Mark Markham, piano
- Piano Quintet – 1994, premiered by the Arditti String Quartet, Ursula Oppens pianist
- Christes Crosse (after Thomas Morley) – 1994, premiered by Phyllis Bryn-Julson, soprano and Mark Markham, piano
- Percussion Quartet – 1994, premiered by the Pulse Ensemble of the New Music Consort
- Guitar Variations – 1994, premiered by Todd Seelye
- Windfall – 1994, premieres by the Rutgers Wind Ensemble, William Berz, conducting
- The Mission of Virgil – the first part of the Dante trilogy for the New York City Ballet – 1993 – two versions: orchestral (premiered by the Toledo Symphony Orchestra, Andrew Massey conducting) and 2-pianos;
- Concerto for Saxophone Quartet and Orchestra – 1993, premiered by the Rascher Saxophone Quartet
- Missa Renovata – 1992
- Saxophone Quartet – 1992, premiered by the Rascher Saxophone Quartet
- Microsymphony – 1992, premiered by the Philadelphia Orchestra, Zdeněk Mácal conductor
- A Winter's Tale – text by Dylan Thomas – 1991, premiered by the Southwest Chamber Music Society, Phyllis Bryn-Julson, soloist
- Delight of the Muses – 1991, premiered by the New York City Ballet, Wuorinen conducting
- Missa Brevis – 1991, premiered by the St. Ignatius of Antioch Church choir, Dr. Harold Chaney, conducting
- Astra – 1990, premiered by the orchestra of the Oberlin Conservatory Robert Spano conductor
- Twang – text of Wallace Stevens – 1989, premiered by Phyllis Bryn-Julson and James Winn
- String Sextet – 1989, premiered by the Chamber Music Society of Lincoln Center
- A solis ortu – 1989, premiered by the Choir of St. Ignatius of Antioch Episcopal Church, Dr. Harold Chaney conducting
- Genesis – 1989, premiered by the San Francisco Symphony and chorus, Herbert Blomstedt conductor
- Agnus Dei (from the Mass for the Restoration of St. Luke in the Fields) – 1989
- Sonata for Violin and Piano – 1988, commissioned by the Library of Congress, premiered by Benjamin Hudson and Garrick Ohlsson
- Machault Mon Chou – 1988, premiered by the San Francisco Symphony, Herbert Blomstedt conductor
- Josquin: Ave Christe (Josquin motet recast for solo piano) – 1988, written as a gift for Stephen Fisher, then president of C. F. Peters Music Publishing.
- Bagatelle – 1988, premiered by Elissa Stutz, piano
- Another Happy Birthday – 1988, premiered by the San Francisco Symphony, Herbert Blomstedt conductor
- Five: Concerto for Amplified Cello and Orchestra – 1987, premiered by New York City Ballet, Wuorinen conducting, Fred Sherry, soloist
- Third String Quartet – 1987, premiered by the Franciscan String Quartet, in honor of the 25th anniversary of the Hopkins Center, Dartmouth College
- Galliard – 1987, premiered by the Cleveland Chamber Orchestra, Edwin London conductor
- Third Piano Sonata – 1986, premiered by Alan Feinberg
- The Golden Dance – 1986, premiered by the San Francisco Symphony, Herbert Blomstedt conductor
- A Doleful Dompe on Deborah Departure as well as Borda's Bawdy Badinage – 1986
- Fanfare (for Rutgers University) – 1986, premiered by members of Rutgers Band, Wuorinen conducting
- Fanfare (for the Houston Symphony) – 1986, premiered by the Houston Symphony, Wuorinen conducting
- Bamboula Beach – 1986, for the inaugural concert of the New World Symphony Orchestra, Michael Tilson Thomas conductor
- Horn Trio Continued – 1985
- Double Solo for Horn Trio – 1985, premiered by Speculum Musicae
- Natural Fantasy – 1985, premiered by David Schuler, organ
- Trombone Trio – 1985, premiered by Parnassus Ensemble
- Prelude to Kullervo – 1985, premiered by the Columbia University Orchestra, Howard Shanet conductor, David Braynard tuba soloist
- Movers and Shakers – 1984, premiered by the Cleveland Orchestra, Christoph von Dohnányi conductor
- Bamboula Squared – 1984, premiered by the American Composers Orchestra, Wuorinen conducting
- Concertino (for 15 Solo Instruments) – 1984, premiered by the Parnassus ensemble, Anthony Korf, conductor
- Crossfire – 1984, premiered by the Baltimore Symphony Orchestra, David Zinman conductor
- Album Leaf (for Howard Klein) – 1984, premiered by Wuorinen, piano
- Concertino – 1984
- Third Piano Concerto – 1983, premiered by the Albany Symphony Orchestra, Julius Hegyi conductor, Garrick Ohlsson soloist
- Spinoff – 1983, premiered by Speculum Musicae
- Trio for Violin, Cello & Piano – 1983, premiered by the Arden Trio
- Rhapsody for Violin and Orchestra – 1983, premiered by San Francisco Symphony, Edo de Waart conductor, Daniel Kobialka violin soloist
- Divertimento for String Quartet – 1982, premiered by the Atlantic String Quartet
- New York Notes – 1982, premiered by the New York New Music Ensemble
- Divertimento for Alto Saxophone and Piano – 1982, premiered by Christopher Ford and Wuorinen
- Mass for the Restoration of St. Luke in the Fields – 1982
- Horn Trio – 1981, premiered by Julie Landsman, horn, Benjamin Hudson, violin and Wuorinen, piano
- Capriccio – 1981, premiered by Alan Feinberg
- Short Suite – 1981, premiered by the American Composers Orchestra, Wuorinen conducting
- Trio for Bass Instruments – 1981, premiered by David Braynard
- The Blue Bamboula – 1980, premiered by Ursula Oppens
- The Celestial Sphere (An Oratorio for Mixed Chorus and Orchestra) – 1980, premiered by the Augustana College Handel Oratorio Society Orchestra, Donald Morrison conductor
- Ecclesiastical Symphonies (4 Movements from "The Celestial Sphere") – 1980, premiered by the Augustana Symphony Orchestra, Daniel Culver conductor
- Beast 708 – 1980, premiered by students at the University of Southern California, Wuorinen conducting
- Percussion Duo – 1979, premiered by Steven Schick and James Avery
- Second String Quartet – 1979, premiered by the Columbia String Quartet
- The Magic Art: An Instrumental Masque drawn from the works of Henry Purcell – 1979, premiered by the Saint Paul Chamber Orchestra, Wuorinen conducting
- Fortune – 1979, premiered by Tashi Quartet
- Psalm 39 – 1979, premiered by Richard Frisch, baritone and David Starobin, guitar
- Joan's Instrumentation – 1979, premiered by the Da Capo Chamber Players
- Three Songs for Tenor and Piano – text by Coburn Britton – 1979, premiered by Paul Sperry and Wuorinen
- Archaeopteryx for Bass Trombone and 10 Players – 1978, premiered by Dave Taylor
- Two-Part Symphony – 1978, premiered by the American Composers Orchestra, Dennis Russell Davies conducting
- Ancestors – 1978, premiered by Chamber Music Northwest, Wuorinen conducting
- Fast Fantasy – 1977, premiered by cellist Fred Sherry and Wuorinen, piano
- The Winds – 1977, premiered by Parnassus, Anthony Korf, conductor
- Self-Similar Waltz – 1977
- Six Pieces for Violin and Piano – 1977, premiered by Max Pollikoff and Wuorinen
- Archangel for Bass Trombone and String Quartet – 1977, premiered by Dave Taylor
- Wind Quintet – 1977, premiered by the Boehm Quintet
- Album Leaf for Ayda and Fred – 1977
- Six Songs For Two Voices – Text by Coburn Britton – 1977, premiered at Somerset County College, New Jersey, Wuorinen conducting
- Percussion Symphony – 1976, premiered by the New Jersey Percussion Ensemble, Wuorinen conducting
- Second Piano Sonata – 1976, premiered by Jeffrey Swann
- Tashi – 1975/6 – two versions: 4 soloists with orchestra (premiered by the Clevaland Orchestra, Wuorinen conducting Tashi Quartet soloists) and 4 soli (premiered by the Tashi Quartet)
- Cello Variations II – 1975, premiered by cellist Fred Sherry
- Hyperion – 1975, premiered by the Contemporary Chamber Ensemble, Arthur Weisberg conductor
- A Reliquary for Igor Stravinsky – 1975, Premiere at the Ojai Festival, Michael Tilson Thomas, conductor
- The W. of Babylon, (or The Triumph of Love over Moral Depravity) – 1975, premiered by the San Francisco Symphony, Wuorinen conducting
- Fantasia – 1974, premiered by Paul Zukofsky and Wuorinen
- Second Piano Concerto (for Amplified Piano and Orchestra) – 1974, premiered by the New York Philharmonic, Erich Leinsdorf conductor, Wuorinen as soloist
- Anthem for Epiphany – 1974
- Third Trio for Flute, Cello and Piano – 1973, Premiered by Harvey Sollberger, Fred Sherry and Wuorinen
- Twelve Short Pieces – 1973
- Grand Union – 1973, premiered by Fred Sherry
- Mannheim 87.87.87 – 1973, premiered at the Cathedral of St. John the Divine, New York
- Arabia Felix – 1973, premiered by The Composer's Ensemble, Peter Lieberson, conductor
- Bassoon Variations – 1972, premiered by the Boston Symphony Orchestra Chamber Players
- Concerto for Amplified Violin and Orchestra – 1972, premiered by the Boston Symphony Orchestra, Michael Tilson Thomas conductor, Paul Zukofsky soloist
- Speculum Speculi – 1972, premiered by Speculum Musicae
- Violin Variations – 1972, premiered by Max Pollikoff
- Harp Variations – 1972, premiered by Gloria Agostini and members of the Composers String Quartet
- On Alligators – 1972, premiered by University Of South Florida players
- First String Quartet – 1971, premiered by the Fine Arts Quartet
- Grand Bamboula – 1971, premiered by University of Iowa Orchestra, James Dixon conducting
- Canzona – 1971, premiered by Speculum Musicae, Wuorinen conducting
- Chamber Concerto for Tuba with 12 Winds and 12 Drums – 1970, premiered by Donald Butterfield and Music in Our Time series
- Message to Denmark Hill – text of Richard Howard – 1970, premiered by Richard Frisch, Harvey Sollberger, Fred Sherry, Wuorinen
- Ringing Changes – 1970, premiered by the New Jersey Percussion Ensemble
- A Song to the Lute in Musicke – 1970, premiered by Valarie Lamoree and Wuorinen
- Cello Variations – 1970, premiered by Fred Sherry
- Nature's Concord – 1969, premiered by Ronald Anderson
- Time's Encomium – 1969 – electronic work – awarded the 1970 Pulitzer Prize in Music
- Adapting to the Times – 1969, premiered by Joel Krosnick, cello, and Wuorinen, piano
- First Piano Sonata – 1969, premiered by Alan Mandel, written for and dedicated to Robert Miller
- The Long and the Short – 1969, premiered by Paul Zukofsky
- Contrafactum – 1969, premiered by the University of Iowa Orchestra, James Dixon, conductor
- Flute Variations II – 1968, premiered by Harvey Sollberger
- String Trio – 1968, premiered by the Potomac Trio
- The Politics of Harmony (A Masque) – 1967, text by Richard Monaco, premiered by The Group for Contemporary Music, Wuorinen conducting
- Duo – 1967, premiered by Paul Zukofsky, violin and Wuorinen, piano
- Salve Regina: John Bull – 1966, premiered by The Group for Contemporary Music, Wuorinen conducting
- Making Ends Meet – 1966, premiered by Jean and Kenneth Wentworth
- Harpsichord Divisions – 1966, written for Paul Jacobs
- Janissary Music – 1966, premiered by Raymond DesRoches, percussion
- Bicinium – 1966, premiered by Josef Marx and Judith Martin
- The Bells – 1966 – for carillon
- First Piano Concerto – 1966, premiered by University of Iowa Orchestra, James Dixon conductor, Wuorinen as soloist
- Three Cadenzas for the Mozart Concerto in C Major – 1965? (date is approximated)
- Chamber Concerto for Oboe and 10 Players – 1965, premiered by the Group for Contemporary Music, Wuorinen conducting, Josef Marx, soloist
- Composition for Oboe and Piano – 1965, premiered by Josef Marx and Wuorinen
- Orchestral and Electronic Exchanges – 1965, premiered by the New York Philharmonic, Lukas Foss conductor
- Super Salutem – 1964
- Chamber Concerto for Flute and 10 Players – 1964, premiered at the Festival of Contemporary Music, Tanglewood, Melvin Strauss conductor, Harvey Sollberger, soloist
- Composition for Violin and 10 Instruments – 1964, premiered by Music in Our Time, Arthur Bloom conductor, Max Pollikoff soloist
- Flute Variations I – 1963, premiered by Harvey Sollberger
- Piano Variations – 1963, premiered by Wuorinen
- Chamber Concerto for Cello and 10 Players – 1963, premiered by the Group for Contemporary Music, Arthur Bloom conducting, Robert Martin soloist
- Second Trio: Piece for Stafan Wolpe – 1962, premiered by Harvey Sollberger, Joel Krosnick, Wuorinen
- The Prayer of Jonah – 1962, premiered by the Contemporary Music Society, Daniel Pinkham conducting
- Bearbeitungen ueber das Glogauer Liederbuch – 1962, premiered by Stanley Aronson, Henry Larsen, B. Lurie, Betram Turetzky
- Duuiensela – 1962, premiered by Joel Krosnick, cello and Jens Nygaard, piano
- Octet – 1962, premiered by the New York Chamber Society, Alvin Brehm conductor
- Invention for Percussion Quintet – 1962, Manhattan School of Music Percussion Ensemble, Paul Price conductor
- Trio for Flute, Cello and Piano – 1961, premiered by Harrvey Sollberger, Joel Krosnick, Wuorinen
- Concert for Double Bass Alone – 1961, premiered by Bertram Turetzky
- An Educator's 'Wachet Auf' – 1961, portions of J.S. Bach's Wachet auf, ruft uns die Stimme, BWV 140 for mixed instruments
- Tiento Sobre Cabezon – 1961, premiered at the School of Sacred Music, Unionion Theological Seminary, New York, Thomas Dunn conductor
- Evolutio: Organ – 1961, premiered by Leonard Raver
- Symphonia Sacra – 1961, premiered at St. Thomas Church, New York, Wuorinen conductor
- Consort from Instruments and Voices – 1961 – magnetic tape, premiered at Music of Our Time Series, 92nd Street YMHA New York
- Eight Variations for Violin and Harpsichord – 1960, premiered by Max Pollikoff and Leonard Raver
- Madrigale Spirituale sopra salmo secondo – 1960, premiered at the Bennington Composers Conference
- Concertone for Brass Quintet & Orchestra – 1960, premiered by the University of Iowa Orchestra, James Dixon conductor
- Turetzky Pieces – 1960, premiered by Stanley Aronson, flute; Henry Larsen, clarinet; Bertram Turettzky, bass
- On The Raft – 1960
- Consort of Four Trombones – 1960, premiered by the New Music Chamber Goroup, Jerome L. Keller director
- The Door In The Wall – 1960, premiered by Susan Thieman, Janet Baxter, Wuorinen
- Sonata for Flute and Piano – 1960, premiered by Jean Kershaw and Douglas Nordli
- Symphony III – 1959, premiered by the Orchestra of America, Richard Korn conductor
- Concertante IV – 1959, premiered at Music in Out Time series 92nd Street YHHA, Howard Shanet conductor, Max Pollikoff and Douglas Nordi soloists
- Concertante III – 1959, premiered at Union Theological Seminary School, Leonard Raver, Josef Marx, Paul Wolfe, George Grossman, Joan Brockway
- Musica Duarum Partium Ecclesastica – 1959
- Symphony II – 1959, premiered on the Music in the Making Series, Cooper Union, Howard Shanet conductor
- Three Prepositions for Piano – 1958, Written for Vladimir Ussachevsky for publication in New Music Edition
- Trio Concertante – 1958, premiered by Max Pollikoff, Bob Bloom, Douglas Nordli
- Three Pieces for String Quartet – 1958, premiered at the Chamber Music Conference and Composers' Forum of the East (then known as the Composers' Conference and Chamber Music Center), Bennington, Vermont
- Concerto for Violin and Orchestra – 1958
- Concertante II for Violin and Chamber Orchestra – 1958, premiered by Vermont Chamber Orchestra, Alan Carter conducting, Max Pollikoff soloist
- Sonata for Piano – 1958, premiered by Douglas Nordli
- Spectrum – 1958, for solo violin, brass quintet, piano, premiered by Max Pollikoff, Douglas Nordli, University Brass Ensemble, Philadelphia Music in Our Time series
- Movement for Wind Quintet – 1958
- Symphony in One Movement – 1958, Music in the Making series, Cooper Union, Howard Shanet conducting
- Be Mery All That Be Present – 1957, premiered at the Church of the Transfiguration, NYC, Stuart Gardner director
- Triptych – 1957, for violin, viola and percussion, Premiered at Music of Our Time series, 92nd Street Y, New York, Max Pollikoff violin, Walter Trampler viola, Mo Goldenberg percussion, William Goldenberg piano
- Alternating Currents – 1957, antiphonal piecefor chamber orchestra, premiered at the Chamber Music Conference and Composers' Forum of the East (then known as the Composers' Conference and Chamber Music Center); Henry Brant, conducting
- 3 Mass Movements – 1957, for unaccompanied violin, premiered by Max Pollikoff
- Concertante I for Violin Solo and Strings – 1957, premiered by Vermont Chamber Orchestra, Alan Carter conducting, Max Pollikoff soloist
- String Quartet – 1957, premiered at the Chamber Music Conference and Composers' Forum of the East (then known as the Composers' Conference and Chamber Music Center); Henry Brant, conducting
- Wantering in this Place – 1957, for unaccompanied mezzo-soprano, for Betty Tiedemann
- Dr. Faustus Lights The Lights – 1957, music for Paul Sanasardo's dance adaptation of Gertrude Stein's opera libretto, premiere at Rooftop Theatre, NYC, Leon Hyman conductor
- Music for Orchestra – 1956, premiered by the Columbia University Orchestra, Howard Shanet conductor
- Wind Quintet #1 – 1956, premiered at the Chamber Music Conference and Composers' Forum of the East (then known as the Composers' Conference and Chamber Music Center)
- Subversion – 1956, string septet or orchestra, premiered at the Chamber Music Conference and Composers' Forum of the East (then known as the Composers' Conference and Chamber Music Center); Henry Brant, conducting
- The Descent with Music – 1956, antiphonal pieces, premiered at the Chamber Music Conference and Composers' Forum of the East (then known as the Composers' Conference and Chamber Music Center); Henry Brant, conducting
- Two Tranquil Pieces for Piano – 1956
- Sonatina for Woodwind Quartet – 1956, premiered at the Chamber Music Conference and Composers' Forum of the East (then known as the Composers' Conference and Chamber Music Center)
- Concert Piece for Piano and String Orchestra – 1956, premiered at the Chamber Music Conference and Composers' Forum of the East (then known as the Composers' Conference and Chamber Music Center); Henry Brant, conducting
- Two Lute Songs of Thomas Campion – 1956, premiered at Town Hall, New York by the Trinity School School Glee Club
- Homage a Bach – 1955, premiered by Theodore Pierce, organ
- Prelude and Fugue for Four Percussionists – 1955, premiered the University of Illinois Percussion, Urbana, Paul Price director
- Song and Dance – 1953, premiered by Wuorinen
- Te Decet Hymnus – 1954, premiered in Town Hall, New York by Trinity School Glee Club
- Scherzo – 1953, premiered by Wuorinen
