= Jeffrey Milarsky =

American conductor

- Education: Juilliard School B.M. '88, M.M. '90
- Occupation: Conductor
- Employer(s): Columbia University; Juilliard School

Jeffrey Milarsky is a conductor of contemporary music in New York City.

In the United States and abroad, he has premiered and recorded works of composers including Charles Wuorinen, Milton Babbitt, Elliott Carter, Lasse Thoresen, Gerard Grisey, Jonathan Dawe, Tristan Murail, Ralph Shapey, Luigi Nono, Mario Davidovsky, and Wolfgang Rihm. He has led groups including the American Composers Orchestra, the New York New Music Ensemble, the Chamber Music Society of Lincoln Center, the Columbia Sinfonietta, Speculum Musicae, Cygnus Ensemble, the Fromm Players at Harvard University, the Composers' Ensemble at Princeton University, and the New York Philharmonic chamber music series. He joined the conducting faculty of The Juilliard School as artistic director of the AXIOM Ensemble. He is also artistic director and conductor of the Manhattan School of Music Percussion Ensemble and percussion faculty in the school's contemporary music performance program.

A percussionist who has performed and recorded with the New York Philharmonic among other ensembles, Milarsky is professor of music at Columbia University, where he is the music director–conductor of the Columbia University Orchestra. Also at Columbia, Milarsky is music director and conductor of the Columbia Sinfonietta, which concentrates on 20th- and 21st-century scores. This ensemble performs, tours and records throughout the United States.

In August 2003, Milarsky made his debut with the Bergen Philharmonic Orchestra. In 2004 he opened the ULTIMA Festival in Oslo. That season also included conducting dates in Norway, Italy, Paris, and Austria. In 2006 Milarsky substituted for James Levine at Carnegie Hall, conducting an all-Babbitt program with the MET Chamber Ensemble. At IRCAM, he recorded and performed music by Murail and Joshua Fineberg with the ENSEMBLE FA. In 2008 he conducted the American Composers Orchestra at Carnegie Hall.

Milarsky made his European debut conducting the BIT20 Ensemble in a tour of Norway and the Baltic states. He conducted the Cygnus Ensemble in the world premiere of Babbitt's Swansong, the world premiere and recording of Davidovsky's Flashbacks, and several area premieres of the music of Grisey: Les Espaces acoustiques (New York premiere) for Columbia University's "Music for a New Century" series and Quatre chants pour franchir le seuil (American premiere) with Speculum Musicae. With the Ensemble Sospeso, he has conducted three United States premieres by Rihm and two by Murail.

Milarsky received his bachelor and master of music degrees from the Juilliard School. Upon graduation, he was awarded the Peter Mennin Prize for outstanding leadership and achievement in the arts. He regularly conducts the Juilliard Orchestra, with which he has premiered over 70 works by Juilliard student composers. He is also on Juilliard's Pre-College percussion faculty, and served as director of its Composition Forum.

As a chamber and orchestral musician, Milarsky performs and records regularly with the New York Philharmonic, the Chamber Music Society of Lincoln Center, the American Composers Orchestra, the Stamford Symphony, and Concordia. He has recorded for Angel, Bridge, Teldec, Telarc, New World, CRI, MusicMasters, EMI, Koch, and London records.

Milarsky is the music director of AXIOM, Juilliard's contemporary music ensemble.

He is a 1984 graduate of Central High School in Philadelphia, Pennsylvania.
