= Susan Morton Blaustein =

American composer

Susan Morton Blaustein (born 22 March 1953) is an American feminist, international development practitioner, professor, and philanthropist. She is the founder and Board Chair at WomenStrong International which invests in local women's organizations worldwide, brings them together to learn and share, and amplifies their solutions to improve the lives of urban women and families and to advance progress toward gender equality. Blaustein, who also teaches at Columbia University, was previously a journalist and foreign policy analyst focused on international human rights issues, and a prizewinning American composer, with awards from the National Endowment for the Arts, the Library of Congress, the American Academy of Arts and Letters, and the Guggenheim Foundation.

== Early life and education ==
Susan Blaustein was born in Palo Alto, California, and was raised in Baltimore, Maryland.

Her grandfather, Jacob Blaustein, and great-grandfather, Louis Blaustein, developed the formula for a lead-free, "no-knock" gasoline in 1911 and founded the American Oil Company (AMOCO) to refine and market the product. Her grandfather also was a human rights leader who served as president of the American Jewish Committee, and advised numerous presidents, including Harry S. Truman, John F. Kennedy, and Lyndon B. Johnson on Jewish affairs, lobbied for human rights commitments to be enshrined in the UN charter, and as co-chair of the Jewish Claims Conference Against Germany, helped lead the apportionment of reparations after the Holocaust.

Blaustein attended The Park School, an independent K-12 school in Baltimore, Maryland.

She went on to study music composition at Pomona College with Vienna-born composer Karl Kohn, graduating with a Bachelor of Arts degree in piano and music composition in 1975. She continued her studies in composition with composer Henri Pousseur, at the Conservatoire Royale de Musique in Liège, Belgium; with Seymour Shifrin at Brandeis University; and at the Yale School of Music with Jacob Druckman, Betsy Jolas, and David Lewin, where she earned a DMA in composition in 1986.

While at the Yale School of Music, Blaustein received a number of awards and commissions, including from the National Endowment for the Arts, the Serge Koussevitsky Foundation and the Fromm Foundation at the Library of Congress, the American Composers Orchestra, and several chamber groups and musicians.

She then served as a junior fellow in the Harvard Society of Fellows, where she fulfilled a number of commissioned works, including a cantata on the Song of Songs for mezzo-soprano, tenor, and chamber orchestra, a cello concerto, and a sextet for the New York New Music Ensemble.

== Career ==
Blaustein's career began in music while at Yale University, where she composed her Fantasie for Piano Solo and other chamber works with the help of a grant in 1981 from the National Endowment for the Arts. During her Harvard Junior Fellowship, she completed her Song of Songs, which was premiered by the American Composers Orchestra in 1985; a cello concerto, premiered in 1984 at the Library of Congress by Juilliard Quartet cellist Joel Krosnick with a chamber orchestra conducted by Paul Zukofsky; and several additional solo and chamber pieces.

She served as assistant professor of music at Columbia University from 1985 to 1989, during which time she completed her DMA from the Yale School of Music, composed numerous works, and continued to learn from her senior colleagues, Mario Davidovsky, Jacques-Louis Monod, and George Edwards.

Blaustein said she was "jolted from my ivory tower" in 1988 by her immersion in the challenges facing so many of her neighbors in Manila, Philippines, where she had gone in 1988 to fulfill her Guggenheim Fellowship when her journalist boyfriend-now-husband Alan Berlow opened National Public Radio's first Asia bureau there. It was there, she added, in addition to writing a lot of music, that "she spent time reporting in low-income urban communities and discovered her passion for telling the stories of those battling extreme poverty and injustice."

Blaustein reported on conflict, politics, economics, and social injustice from the Philippines, Cambodia, Vietnam, Myanmar, and Mongolia; she continued to report on policy and injustice from Washington, DC, Huntsville, Texas, and the Balkans, with articles featured in such publications as The New Yorker, Harper's, The Asia Wall Street Journal, Far East Economic Review, The Nation, The New Republic, The Philadelphia Inquirer, Los Angeles Times, and The Washington Post.

In 1998 she began to work with the International Crisis Group, first on Bosnia and then, as a senior consultant, on Kosovo and Serbia, where she worked in coalition with other human rights and humanitarian organizations, and then on the conflict in East Timor. Blaustein moved to the Coalition for International Justice to continue her reporting, together with veteran humanitarian and investigator John Fawcett, on the gross human rights abuses and financial misdeeds perpetrated by alleged war criminals Slobodan Milošević and Saddam Hussein.

In 2006, Blaustein co-founded and then led The Millennium Cities Initiative, a decade-long Earth Institute project devoted to helping selected sub-Saharan cities practice sustainable urban development by attaining the Millennium Development Goals. In the course of that work, Blaustein and colleagues observed that across the Millennium Cities, the local women always understood the challenges facing their communities and had solutions to offer, but were rarely heeded and lacked the resources to put their ideas to the test.

In 2014–15, Blaustein and several colleagues used this knowledge to found WomenStrong International, which provides grants and technical assistance to organizations that work to improve the wellbeing of women and girls in urban communities worldwide. Since its founding, WomenStrong has awarded more than $13 million in grants and supported 33 organizations in highly vulnerable communities across 23 countries.

== Other activities ==
Blaustein has served on the boards of a number of non-profit organizations, including Physicians for Human Rights, Partners for Dignity and Rights (formerly National Economic and Social Rights Initiative), the School for Ethics and Global Leadership, Millennium Promise, Sidwell Friends School, the Jacob Blaustein Institute for the Advancement of Human Rights at the American Jewish Committee, and two family foundations.

== Recognition ==
Blaustein received a Guggenheim Fellowship in 1988, a Harvard Junior Fellowship from the Harvard Society of Fellows (1982–85), and has received numerous awards, including from the American Academy of Arts and Letters, BMI (1978), Brandeis University, The Serge Koussevitzsky Foundation at the Library of Congress (1984), and the National Endowment for the Arts (1981).

She has composed works commissioned by numerous artists, including by the American Composers Orchestra, New York New Music Ensemble, Speculum Musicae, cellist Joel Krosnick, and flautist Jayn Rosenfeld, and her music has been premiered by these artists, as well as by the Kronos Quartet, the Contemporary Chamber Ensemble conducted by Arthur Weisberg, baritone Elwood Peterson, mezzo-soprano Janet Steele, and the pianists Alan Feinberg, Martin Goldray and Sally Pinkas.

Blaustein was honored was honored with the Ban Ki-moon Award for Women's Empowerment, awarded by Asia Initiatives in 2018, as one of Women's eNews's "21 Leaders for the 21st Century" in 2019, and with the Blaisdell Award for Distinguished Service from Pomona College and the Paul Farmer Award from Partners for Dignity & Rights, both in 2025.

== Works ==
Selected works include:

- To Orpheus for mixed a cappella chorus, text: 4 sonnets of Rilke, 1922
- Ricercate: String Quartet No. 1, 1981

She has written professional articles including: "The Survival of Aesthetics: Books by Boulez, Delio, Rochberg". Perspectives of New Music 27, no. 1 (Winter 1989): 272–303.

== Selected Publications ==
- Improving Lives in Sub-Saharan Cities: A Laboratory in Global Urban Development, Susan M. Blaustein, Millennium Cities Initiative, published by The Earth Institute, Columbia University (2015).
- “One Path Toward Effective Global Development: Learning from Those with the Most at Stake,” Harvard International Review (November 2016).
- “Time to Invest in Making Cities Safe for Women,” Ms. Magazine (November 2, 2021).
- “A Seat at the Table: Women’s Knowledge is Key to Cities’ Effective Climate Response,” Cities Alliance (July 19, 2022).
- “Making ‘The Right To The City’ Real For Urban Dwellers Worldwide,” Next City (December 9. 2022).
- “5 Tips for Inclusive Disaster-Risk Management Planning,” by Blaustein, Susan M., and Zoe Elena Trohanis, World Bank “Sustainable Cities” blog (July 11, 2023).
- “Empowering Women to Make Cities More Climate Resilient,” in Livable Cities for the Future, edited by Geeta Mehta and Dikshu C. Kukreja, New Delhi: ORF and Global Policy Journal (August 2023).
- “The Well-Being of Girls Everywhere Demands Climate Action,” “Connect4Climate,” World Bank Group (October 26, 2023).
- “Cities Facing Climate Emergencies Need All Hands on Deck,” Next City (October 31, 2023).
- “WomenStrong International: Celebrating 10 Years of Women-Led Progress and Community Building,” Women’s eNews (March 17, 2024).
- “Climate, Conflict, and Girls: Time for Action,” “Connect4Climate,” World Bank (October 15, 2024).
- “Whither Women’s and Girls’ Rights, in our Brave New World?” WomenStrong International (December 10, 2o24).
- “What We’re Up Against: The Challenge of Fighting for Women’s Rights in 2025,” Ms. Magazine (January 10, 2025).
- “America’s War on Care,” Women’s eNews (May 26, 2025).
