= Synchronisms (Davidovsky) =

Musical compositions by Mario Davidovsky

Synchronisms is a series of twelve musical compositions for live instruments and electronic sounds on pre-recorded tape composed by Mario Davidovsky at the Columbia-Princeton Electronic Music Center, dating from 1963 to 2006. Davidovsky explains that, "One of the central ideas of these pieces is the search to find ways of embedding both the acoustic and the electronic into a single, coherent musical and aesthetic space."

The series,"is characterized by the interaction of virtuoso musicians with a counterpoint of electronically generated sounds covering a broad tonal and timbral spectrum." Davidovsky described the goals of his series: "In those works, I try to keep, on the one hand, as much as possible of what is characteristic of the electronic instrument [medium], and, on the other, what is characteristic of the live performer. At the same time, each extends the other." In the series Davidovsky attempts "exact coordination only in short passages of intricate counterpoint; elsewhere, in more extended passages in which one component clearly accompanied the other, 'an element of chance ["leeway in the synchronization"] is introduced'".

The works are as follows:

1. Flute (1963)
2. Flute, clarinet, violin, cello (1963)
3. Cello (1964)
4. Men's chorus (1967, withdrawn)
5. Percussion quintet (1969)
6. Piano (1970)
7. Orchestra (1973)
8. Wind quintet (1974)
9. Violin (1988)
10. Guitar (1992)
11. Double bass (2005)
12. Clarinet (2006)

== No. 6 ==
Synchronisms No. 6, for piano and electronic sound (1970) was awarded the Pulitzer Prize for Music in 1971. Published by E. B. Marks, it was premiered on August 19, 1970, at the Tanglewood Music Festival. It was written for pianist Robert Miller (of The Group for Contemporary Music. The Pulitzer jury found that the piece "shows mastery of a new medium and its imaginative use in combination with the solo pianoforte." Violinist and composer Mari Kimura, who later studied with Davidovsky, cited Synchronisms No. 6 as prompting her initial interest in electronic music.

== Recordings ==
- Boston Musica Viva - Boston Musica Viva Plays Schwanter, Ives and Others (1987) [No. 3]
- Aleck Karis - Secret Geometry (1996) [No. 6]
- Jennifer Frautschi - Solovision (2003) [No. 9]
- Davidovsky - Flashbacks (2000) [No. 10]
- David Bowlin - Bird As Prophet (2019) [No. 9]
- Michael Nicolas - Transitions (2016) [No. 3]

== See also ==
- Désintégrations
- Synchronicity
