= Robert Miller (pianist) =

American pianist and attorney

Robert Miller (December 5, 1930 – November 30, 1981) was an American pianist and attorney.

== Life ==
Miller was born in New York City and grew up in Mount Vernon. His early musical studies were with Mathilde McKinney and Abbey Simon, after which he studied at Princeton University where he graduated in 1952, magna cum laude in music, with a senior thesis on Beethoven's Diabelli Variations.

After serving in Korea with the U. S. Army for two years, he decided that the music he preferred to play would never lead to success with critics or to public fame in a world which he saw as one of musical museums, public salons and performing circuses. Consequently, he studied law at Columbia University where he graduated in 1957, the same year that he made his formal debut as a pianist in Carnegie Recital Hall. He was admitted to the bar in the following year, joining the firm of Scribner & Miller and becoming a partner in 1965. This firm later became Miller & McCarthy.

As a pianist, Miller specialized in performing music by Northeastern American composers "of a cerebral, technically demanding bent", such as Milton Babbitt, Stefan Wolpe, Charles Wuorinen and Elliott Carter. Mario Davidovsky wrote his Pulitzer Prize–winning Synchronisms No. 6 for Piano and Electronic Sound (1970) for Miller. His fluent technique enabled him on one occasion to learn Roger Sessions's Second Piano Sonata in a single night. He performed throughout the United States, as well as in Europe and Latin America. Beginning in 1964, he taught in the summers at the Composers Conference and Chamber Music Center in Vermont, and also gave master classes and seminars throughout the US.

He died of cancer at 50 years of age on November 30, 1981, in Lawrence Hospital in Bronxville, New York. The Group for Contemporary Music presented a memorial concert for Miller on November 30, 1982, and released an LP dedicated to his memory in 1982. It contained the pianist's final recording, Wuorinen's Arabia Felix.

== Discography ==
- Billy Jim Layton: Five Studies for Violin and Piano (Matthew Raimondi, violin; Yehudi Wyner, piano); Three Studies for Piano, Op. 5 (Yehudi Wyner, piano); Claudio Spies: Impromptu, for piano (Robert Miller, piano); Viopiacem (Samuel Rhodes, viola; Robert Miller, piano and harpsichord); Charles Whittenberg: String Quartet in One Movement (Composers String Quartet). LP recording 1 sound disc: analog, 33⅓ rpm, stereo, 12 in. CRI SD 257. New York: Composers Recordings, Inc., 1970.
- Arthur Berger: Septet (Contemporary Chamber Ensemble; Arthur Weisberg, conductor); Five Pieces for Piano (Robert Miller, piano); Peter Westergaard: Variations for Six Players (Group for Contemporary Music at Columbia University; Harvey Sollberger, conductor); Harvey Sollberger: Grand Quartet for Flutes (David Gilbert, Thomas Nyfenger, Harvey Sollberger, Sophie Sollberger, flutes). Acoustic Research Contemporary Music Project 6. LP recording 1 sound disc: 33⅓ rpm, stereo, 12 in. AR 0654 088; West Germany: AR, 1971.
- The Contemporary Composer in the U.S.A. Mario Davidovsky: Synchronisms No. 6 (Robert Miller, piano); Electronic Study No. 3 (tape realized at the Electronic Music Center, Princeton and Columbia Universities); Synchronisms No. 5 (Group for Contemporary Music, Harvey Sollberger, conductor). Barbara Kolb: Trobar clus (Contemporary Chamber Players, Barbara Kolb, conducting); Solitaire (Cheryl Seltzer, piano; Richard Fitz, vibraphone). LP recording 1 sound disc: 33⅓ rpm, stereo, 12 in. Turnabout TV-S 34487. [New York]: Turnabout, 1972.
- Contemporary Piano Music. Charles Wuorinen: Piano Sonata; Stefan Wolpe: Form and Form IV; Yehudi Wyner: Three Short Fantasies; George Perle: Toccata. Robert Miller, piano. LP recording, 1 sound disc: 33⅓ rpm, stereo, 12 in. Composers Recordings CRI SD 306. New York: Composers Recordings, 1974.
- George Crumb: Makrokosmos: Twelve Fantasy-Pieces after the Zodiac, for Amplified Piano. (Volume II). Robert Miller, piano. Modern American Music Series. LP recording 1 sound disc: analog, 33⅓ rpm, stereo, 12 in. Columbia Odyssey Y 34135. New York: Columbia Records, 1976.
- Sound Forms for Piano. Henry Cowell: The Banshee, Aeolian Harp, Piano Piece (Paris 1924) ; Ben Johnston: Sonata for Microtonal Piano; John Cage: Sonatas and Interludes for Prepared Piano: Sonata I, Sonata V, Second Interlude, Sonata X, Sonata XII (Robert Miller, piano and prepared piano); Conlon Nancarrow: Studies for Player Piano Nos. 1, 27, and 36. LP recording, 1 sound disc: analog, 33⅓ rpm, stereo, 12 in. New World Records NW 203. New York: New World Records, 1976.
- New Music for Virtuosos. Milton Babbitt: Phonemena, for soprano and piano (Lynn Webber, soprano; Ellen Weckler, piano); Phonemena, for soprano and tape (Lynn Webber, soprano); Reflections, for piano and synthesized tape; Post-partitions (Robert Miller, piano); William O. Smith: Fancies, for clarinet alone (William O. Smith, clarinet); Leslie Bassett: Music for Saxophone and Piano (Donald Sinta, saxophone; Jerry Kuderna, piano); Charles Wuorinen: Bassoon Variations (Donald MacCourt, bassoon). Recorded at Columbia Recording Studios, 30th St., New York. Recorded Anthology of American Music. LP recording 1 sound disc: analog, 33⅓ rpm, stereo, 12 in. New World Records NW 209. New York: New World Records, 1977.
- John Harbison: Piano Concerto; David Stock: Inner Space. Robert Miller, piano (Harbison); American Composers Orchestra; Gunther Schuller, conductor. Recorded May 13, 1980, Church of the Holy Trinity, New York. American Contemporary. LP recording 1 sound disc: analog, 33 1/3 rpm, stereo, 12 in.. CRI SD 440. New York: Composers Recordings, Inc., 1981.
- Charles Wuorinen: Arabia Felix (Harvey Sollberger, flute; Donald MacCourt, bassoon; David Starobin, guitar; Benjamin Hudson, violin; Raymond DesRoches, vibraphone; Robert Miller, piano; Charles Wuorinen, conductor); Harvey Sollberger: Angel and Stone (Harvey Sollberger, flute; Aleck Karis, piano). Nicolas Roussakis: Voyage: ordre, beauté, luxe, calme, volupté (Manhattan Chorus; Daniel Paget, conductor). Recorded 1981–1982. LP recording 1 sound disc: analog, 33⅓ rpm, stereo, 12 in. Composers Recordings CRI SD 463. New York: Composers Recordings, 1982.
