= Children's Songs (Chick Corea album) =

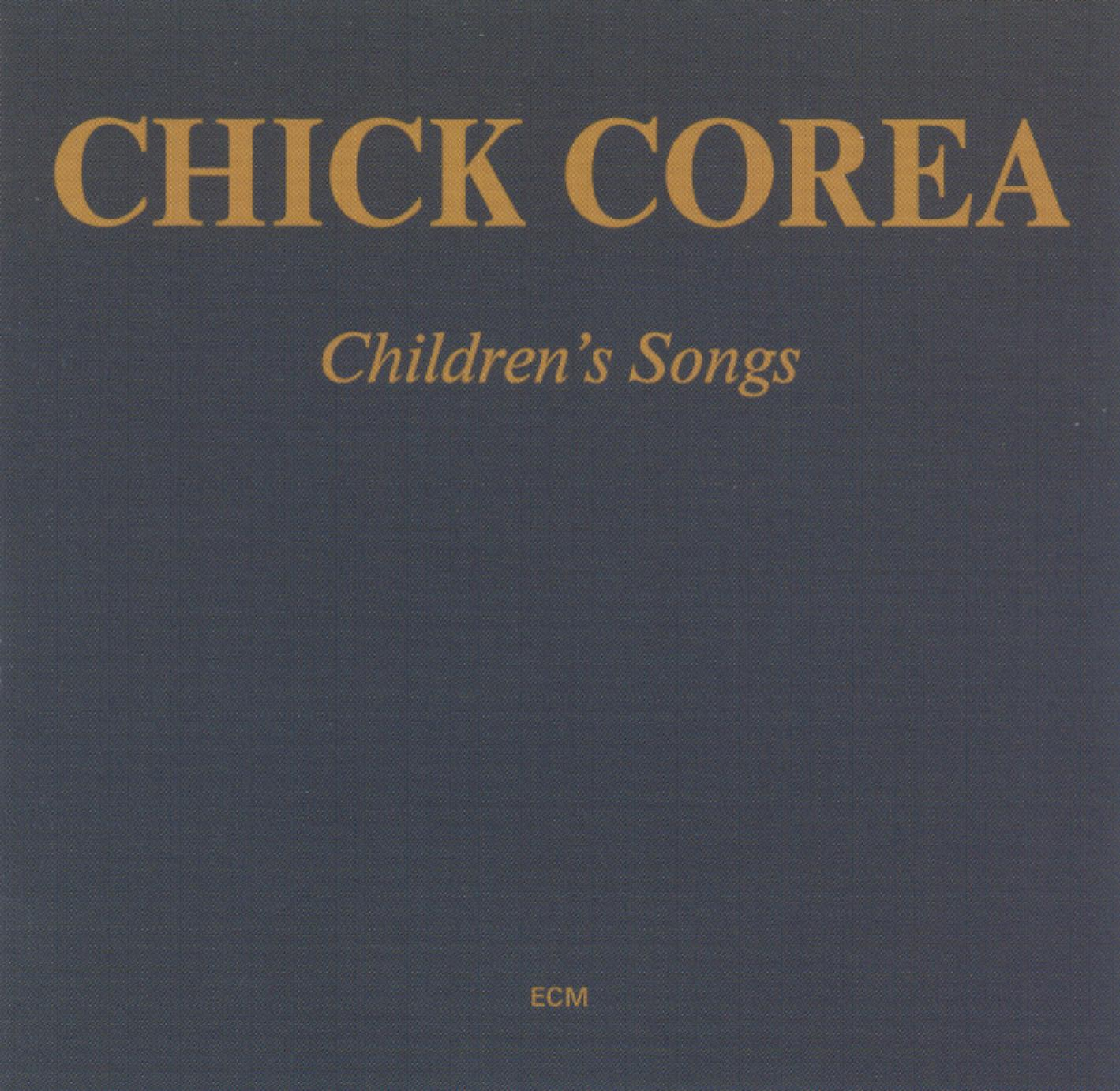

Studio album by Chick Corea
- Released: April 1984
- Recorded: July 1983
- Genre: Jazz, classical
- Length: 37:41
- Label: ECM 1267
- Producer: Manfred Eicher

Chick Corea chronology
The Meeting (1983)	Children's Songs (1984)	Voyage (1985)

Professional ratings
Review scores
Source	Rating
AllMusic	3.5/5 stars
The Penguin Guide to Jazz Recordings	2.5/4 stars
The Rolling Stone Jazz Record Guide	3/5 stars

Children's Songs is an album by jazz pianist Chick Corea recorded in July 1983 and released on ECM the following year. The trio features violinist Ida Kavafian and cellist Fred Sherry.

== Background and composition ==
Children's Songs mainly consists of short songs with simple themes. There is little development in the pieces, which capture a variety of melodies and moods. Corea began writing the first song in 1971.

In the preface of the annotated version Corea stated that he aimed "to convey simplicity as beauty, as represented in the Spirit of a child".

There are stylistic and structural parallels to the cycle Mikrokosmos, by Béla Bartók, including:

- use of the pentatonic scales
- employment of unusual time signatures and cross-rhythms
- expressing a complex variety of atmosphere in a relatively short time
- increasing difficulty and complexity through the sequence

== Track listing ==
1. "No.1"
2. "No.2"
3. "No.3"
4. "No.4"
5. "No.5"
6. "No.6"
7. "No.7"
8. "No.8"
9. "No.9"
10. "No.10"
11. "No.11"
12. "No.12"
13. "No.13"
14. "No.14"
15. "No.15"
16. "No.16 & 17"
17. "No.18"
18. "No.19"
19. "No.20"
20. "Addendum" - (for violin, cello and piano)

== Personnel ==
- Chick Corea – piano
- Ida Kavafian – violin
- Fred Sherry – cello
