= The Group for Contemporary Music =

American classical music ensemble

The Group for Contemporary Music is an American chamber ensemble dedicated to the performance of contemporary classical music. It was founded in New York City in 1962 by Joel Krosnick, Harvey Sollberger and Charles Wuorinen and gave its first concert on October 22, 1962 in Columbia University's MacMillin Theatre. Krosnik left the ensemble in 1963. It was the first contemporary music ensemble based at a university and run by composers.

The Group was based at Columbia University from 1962 until 1971, when it took up residency at the Manhattan School of Music. Initial support was provided by the Alice M. Ditson Fund of Columbia, followed later by support from a broad range of foundations and public sources. The Group's success led the Rockefeller Foundation to form lavishly funded "spin-off" ensembles at Rutgers University, the University at Buffalo, the University of Iowa and the University of Chicago in the middle 1960s.

Early supporters of the Group included such Columbia faculty as Jack Beeson, Otto Luening and Vladimir Ussachevsky. Edgard Varese and Aaron Copland were also among its champions. The early years of the Group were tied in, as well, with the early development of electronic music in the United States. Early on the Group affiliated itself with the Columbia-Princeton Electronic Music Center, and many premieres of important new works involving instruments and electronics by such composers as Milton Babbitt, Mario Davidovsky and Vladimir Ussachevsky were presented on its concerts.

At the heart of the Group were its performers. Aside from Krosnik, Sollberger and Wuorinen, others who were central to its early and continued success included Sophie Sollberger, flute; Josef Marx, oboe; Arthur Bloom and Jack Kreiselman, clarinets; Donald MacCourt, bassoon; Barry Benjamin, horn; Ronald K. Anderson, trumpet; the brothers Robert and James Biddlecome, trombones; Raymond DesRoches and Richard Fitz, percussionists; Robert Miller, pianist; Aleck Karis, pianos; Susan Jolles, harp; Jeanne Benjamin, Benjamin Hudson and Linda Quan, violins; Jacob Glick and Lois Martin, violas; Fred Sherry and Peter Rosenfeld, cellos; Bertram Turetzky, Donald Palma and Kenneth Fricker, contrabasses; and Valarie Lamoreaux, soprano. Conducting duties were shared by Sollberger and Wuorinen and later with Gunther Schuller. Over the course of years, younger performers who had "learned the ropes" with the Group formed their own ensembles patterned on it; one outstanding example of this is Speculum Musicae, which was formed in 1971.

A broad range of composers was represented by the Group over the course of its first 25 years. A brief (but not exhaustive) list includes Tobias Picker, Edgard Varèse, Elliott Carter, Milton Babbitt, Igor Stravinsky, Béla Bartók, Donald Martino, Peter Westergaard, Benjamin Boretz, Otto Luening, Vladimir Ussachevsky, Mario Davidovsky, Goffredo Petrassi, Stefan Wolpe, Ursula Mamlok, Ralph Shapey, Karlheinz Stockhausen, Pierre Boulez, Luciano Berio, Harley Gaber, Alban Berg, Arnold Schoenberg, Anton Webern, Harrison Birtwistle, Peter Maxwell Davies, Ezra Laderman, Raoul Pleskow, Elaine Barkin, Arthur Berger, Yehudi Wyner, Bülent Arel, Joji Yuasa, Toru Takemitsu, Francisco Kropfl, Jeffrey Kresky, David Olan, Goffredo Petrassi, Aaron Copland, Morton Gould, Frederick Fox, Ross Lee Finney, Roger Reynolds, Robert Stewart, Jacob Druckman, Bernard Rands, Robert Hall Lewis, Claudio Spies, John Harbison, Joan Tower, Chester Biscardi, Carlos Salzedo, Lukas Foss, and Richard Edward Wilson.

The Group recorded extensively for a number of labels (CRI, RCA Victor, New World and later Koch and Naxos) and performed in venues such as the University of Chicago, the University of Iowa, Southern Illinois University, Amherst College, Swarthmore College, Princeton University, the Eastman School of Music, Washington and Lee University, Stony Brook University, Avery Fisher Hall (for the New York Philharmonic) and Rutgers University.

The ensemble was awarded a citation from the American Academy and Institute of Arts and Letters in 1985.

== Partial discography ==
- Milton Babbitt: Soli e Duettini. Naxos Records 8.559259
- Elliott Carter: Eight Compositions. Bridge Records 9044.
- Chou Wen-chung: Pien, Yu Ko, Cursive, The Willows Are New, Landscapes. CRI 691
- Jacob Druckman: String Quartets nos 2 & 3, Dark Wind, Reflections on the Nature of Water. Naxos Records 8559260.
- Morton Feldman: String Quartet. Naxos Records 8.559190
- Donald Martino: Later works. Albany Records Troy 1167.
- Donald Martino: Triple Concerto. Albany Records Troy 168.
- Roger Sessions: String Quintet, String Quartet No. 1. Naxos Records 8.559261
- Harvey Sollberger: Chamber Variations, Divertimento. CRI 743
- Edgard Varèse: Déserts. CRI 268
- Peter Westergaard: Mr. & Mrs. Discobbolos. CRI 696
- Stefan Wolpe: Oboe Quartet. String Quartet, Trio for Flute Cello and Piano. Naxos Records 8.559262
- Stefan Wolpe: The Man From Midian. Naxos Records 8.559265
- Charles Wuorinen: Chamber Music. New World Records NW 385–2
- Charles Wuorinen: Six Trios. Naxos Records 8.559264
- Charles Wuorinen: The Mission of Virgil, The Great Procession, The River of Light. Naxos Records 8.559345
