= David Noon =

American classical composer

- Born: July 23, 1946 (age 79); Johnstown, Pennsylvania, U.S.
- Education: New York University; Yale University
- Occupations: contemporary classical composer and educator

David Noon (born 23 July 1946) is a contemporary classical composer and educator. He has written over 200 works from opera to chamber music. Noon's composition teachers have included Karl Kohn, Darius Milhaud, Charles Jones, Yehudi Wyner, Mario Davidovsky, and Wlodzimierz Kotonski. He was a distinguished member of the faculty at the Manhattan School of Music for 30 years.

== Biography ==
David Noon was born on 23 July 1946 in Johnstown, Pennsylvania. He is of Pennsylvania Dutch, Welsh, and American Indian heritage. His formal musical education began at the age of 8 when he learned to play the clarinet. Subsequently, he took bassoon, flute, piccolo, and piano lessons. Throughout his childhood, he frequently performed in choirs, bands, orchestras, and chamber music ensembles. During his collegiate years at Pomona College, he continued to sing and play bassoon and piano. He also began the systematic study of composition. Following his undergraduate education, he attended New York University to study Medieval music with Gustave Reese. After receiving an MA in musicology at NYU, he attended Yale University, where he received an MMA and a DMA in composition.

In 1972–73, he was a Fulbright Fellow in composition at the Music Conservatory in Warsaw, Poland. From 1973 to 1976, Noon taught music theory and composition and supervised the advanced ear-training program at the School of Music at Northwestern University. In 1976, he was composer-in-residence at the Wurlitzer Foundation in Taos, New Mexico. From 1996 to 1998, Noon was Composer Artist-in-Residence at the Episcopal Cathedral of St. John the Divine.

A prolific composer, Noon has written 232 works, including chamber music, orchestral works, and choral compositions. He has written 11 string quartets, 3 piano concertos, the opera R.S.V.P., and many works featuring percussion. He has also written 2 books of poetry: Postcards from Rethymno and Bitter Rain; 3 historical novels: The Tin Box, Googie's, and My Name Was Saul; and 3 Nadia Boulanger mysteries, Murder at the Ballets Russes, The Tsar's Daughter, and The Organ Symphony.

He was on the faculty of Manhattan School of Music in New York City from 1981 to 2011, where he was chairman of the Music History Department (1981-2007), chairman of the Composition Department (1989–98), and dean of academics (1998-2006). In 2007–08, Noon was a visiting professor of musicology and composition at the Central Conservatory in Beijing, China. Noon resides in New York City and on the Greek island of Crete.

== Awards ==
- Manhattan School of Music Presidential Medal of Honor (2006)
- ASCAP Standard Awards in Composition (yearly since 1973 to the present)
- YMF Debut Award in Composition (1973)
- Yale University's Harriet Gibbs Fox Memorial Prize (1972)
- Yale University's Jon Day Jackson Prize (1972)
- Yale University's Woods Chandler Memorial Prize (1971)
- Composers' Forum, New York City (1971)
- Aspen Music Festival prizes in composition (1969, 71, 79)
- YMF career grants in composition (1968, 71)
- BMI Awards to Student Composers (1967, 70)

== Fellowships and prizes ==
- Chamber Music America (1993)
- Pomona College Centennial commission (1987)
- Houston Symphony Orchestra commission (1981)
- NEA commissions (1977)
- Wurlitzer Foundation of Taos, New Mexico, composer-in-residence (1976–77)
- Berkshire Music Center Fellowship in Composition at Tanglewood (1974)
- Yale University's Lucy G. Moses Scholarship (1971)
- Yale University's David Stanley Smith Memorial Scholarship (1971)
- Yale University scholarship in music (1970)
- Aspen Music Festival scholarships in composition (1969, 71, 75, 77, 79, 80, 81)
- NDEA Title-IV fellowship in music at New York University (1968–70)

== Compositions ==
Influenced by Stravinsky, Webern, and Boulez, Noon wrote serial music until 1975. It was in that year, in the finale of his String Quartet #1, that Noon abruptly wrote a volta in the style of a Renaissance viol consort. This was the beginning of Noon's conscious reference to styles, techniques, and formal procedures of the past. While often maintaining a fully chromatic harmonic and melodic language, Noon's music frequently makes allusions to tonal diatonicism. The sharp distinction between chromatically dissonant and diatonically tonal music has become a stylistic trait of Noon's work.

Formally, Noon's music is clearly indebted to the Classical tradition with his music being frequently informed by references to sonata-allegro, variation, rondo, and binary dance forms of the past. His early and continued interest in Medieval and Renaissance music has influenced many of his compositions with regard to choices of text (Boethius, St. Augustine of Canterbury, Sedulius Scottus, Columbanus, Alcuin, Villon, Petrarch), constructive techniques (including isorhythm), and basic melodic material (especially Gregorian Chant). The obvious influence of Medieval music can be heard in Noon's Alleluias for solo flute, winds & percussion, A Medieval Reliquary for baritone, flute, 'cello & harp, Tristan's Mirror and Miroir Estampie both for 2 pianos, and String Quartet #7 "le tombeau des troubadours." Blending Medieval and Renaissance with contemporary procedures has become a hallmark of Noon's pluralistic, Post-Modern work.

Alongside music for traditional ensembles, Noon has frequently written music for percussion from large ensembles such as his Symphonia Apocalyptica for 12 percussionists to solo works such as Hardcore for solo timpanist. While usually writing for traditional percussion instruments, Noon occasionally writes theatrical pieces for found percussion (music stand, pots & pans, playing cards, brooms), for example, his works Stand Up!, Hot Grease, Nasty Licks!, Table for One, Hit the Deck, and Swept Away.

- Serenade for English Horn and String Quartet Op. 78 – premiered March 1985 by the New York Philharmonic Ensemble.
- Sonata da camera Op. 89 – recorded on Sonata da Camera for Flute and Harp (Label: Cantilena 66035-2).
- Tristan's Lament with Rotta Op. 119 for solo harp – composed in 1993.
- Three Pieces – transcriptions of three piano works by Debussy: L'Isle joyeuse, La Fille aux cheveux de Lin, and Tarantelle styrienne for flute, harp, and string quartet.
