= Karl Kohn =

American composer (1926–2024)

- Born: August 1, 1926; Vienna, Austria
- Died: November 18, 2024 (aged 98); Claremont, California, U.S.
- Occupations: Composer, pianist
- Employer: Pomona College

Karl Georg Kohn (August 1, 1926 – November 18, 2024) was an Austrian-born American composer, teacher and pianist. He taught at Pomona College for more than 40 years.

== Biography ==
Kohn began playing the piano as a child in Vienna; after he emigrated to the United States at the age of 13, he continued his education at the New York College of Music (1940–1944) and at Harvard (B.A., M.A.) where he studied composition with Walter Piston, Irving Fine, and Randall Thompson. He was W. M. Keck Distinguished Service Professor Emeritus at Pomona College, where he taught for over forty years. His students at Pomona included Douglas Leedy, David Noon, Nancy Raabe (Miller), and Susan Morton Blaustein as well as, privately, Frank Zappa and John McGuire. Zappa named Karl Kohn in the sleeve of his debut album Freak Out! (1966) as one of the people who influenced his music.

With his wife, Margaret Kohn, he had a long career as a duo-pianist in the United States and in Europe, with a repertoire focused on major 20th century works by Debussy, Bartók, Berio, Stravinsky, Messiaen, Ligeti, Reich, and Boulez. Kohn played in the US premiere of Boulez's Structures together with the composer.

Kohn's own works have been performed by the Los Angeles Philharmonic and Buffalo Philharmonic Orchestras, the Oakland Symphony, the Saint Paul Chamber Orchestra, on the San Francisco Symphony's Musica Viva series, at the Monday Evening Concerts in Los Angeles (Kohn served for two decades on the board of directors of the Monday Evening Concerts), and in concerts and broadcasts throughout the United States and abroad.

Kohn died in Claremont, California on November 18, 2024, at age 98.

== Compositions ==
Kohn composed in all major genres of concert music. His work uses a unique collage-like style, in which individual instruments or groups of instruments project themselves from the surrounding events. His music cannot easily be immediately identified as either European or American in character, as it uses both the resources of his deep engagement in the European classical traditional as well as a more empirical approach to his materials.

Karl Kohn's principal publishers are Carl Fischer Music, New York, GunMar Music, Inc., (from Shawnee Press, Delaware Water Gap, PA), Edition Contemp Art, Vienna, and Material Press, Frankfurt am Main.
