= Emi Ferguson =

- Education: Juilliard School
- Occupations: Flutist, composer, singer, professor
- Organization(s): Juilliard School; Handel and Haydn Society; New York New Music Ensemble
- Musical career
- Genres: Baroque pop, classical, indie pop
- Instruments: Flute; vocals
- Label: Arezzo Music
- Website: emiferguson.com

Emi Ferguson is an English-American flutist, performer, singer, composer, and professor at the Juilliard School.

== Early life ==
Ferguson was born in Japan to English parents. A few years later, her family moved to London and then to Boston, Massachusetts. She graduated from The Winsor School in 2005 and then attended college at Juilliard School. Ferguson was the first person to graduate from Juilliard with both undergraduate and graduate degrees with scholastic distinction in flute performance. While pursuing her Bachelor's in flute performance, she studied epidemiology at Columbia University's Mailman School of Public Health. She also received a second Master's degree, which was in historical performance as a Paul and Daisy Soros Fellow. This program was Juilliard's inaugural historical performance class, with renowned musician William Christie conducting auditions, and Ferguson was the only flutist accepted.

== Career ==
=== Performance ===
Ferguson plays both baroque and modern flute around the world as a soloist and with groups. In January 2019, Ferguson became the Principal Flute for the Handel and Haydn Society. She currently performs with several other groups, ensembles, and orchestras as well, including the New York New Music Ensemble, American Modern Opera Company (AMOC*), Tafelmusik, and Manhattan Chamber Players. She has also previously performed with the Argento Chamber Ensemble, New York Baroque Incorporated, and New Vintage Baroque.

Ferguson likes to fuse different music genres together as well as music from different centuries. She is frequently applauded for her "unique approach to the flute" and for her ability to "stretch the boundaries of baroque music."

=== Albums ===
She has released two solo albums. In September 2017, she released her debut album, Amour Cruel, on which she is the flutist, composer, singer, and arranger. Described as a crossover between indie pop and classical, the album was on the Classical, Classical Crossover, and World Music Billboard Charts for four weeks. A classical music critic from The Washington Post described the album as "a modern hit" and The Boston Globe described Amour Cruel as sounding like "what would happen if Lana del Rey ended up at Louis XIV's court."

In June 2019, she released her second album, Fly the Coop: Bach Sonatas and Precludes with the group Ruckus Early Music. The album debuted at #1 on the iTunes Classical Charts and at #2 on the Classical Albums and Traditional Classical Billboard Charts. Classical Radio Boston characterized the album as "unleash[ing] the kind of unexpected music-making that must have delighted and tickled audiences in Bach’s day" and notes that Ferguson "jams with sheer dazzle."

Her 2026 album, Toward the Sea, with classical guitarist Michael Poll was released by Orchid Classics and was called "exquisitely performed...a testament to the magic that unfolds when two exceptional artists perform in perfect artistic harmony."

=== Teaching ===
She currently is on faculty at Juilliard, where she teaches Ear Training, as well as at the Bach Virtuosi Festival. She has previously taught at the University at Buffalo.

== Honors and awards ==
She has spoken and performed at many TEDx events and made appearances in Amazon's The Marvelous Mrs. Maisel, Vox's Netflix: Explained, and The Discovery Channel, among many others. Her work has been featured and acclaimed in news sources such as The New York Times, The Washington Post, and The Boston Globe.

Ferguson has won numerous awards. She was 1st Prize winner of the Juilliard Concerto Competition, of the National Flute Association's Young Artist Competition, of the New York Flute Club Young Artist competition, of the Mid-Atlantic Flute Competition, of the J.C. Arriaga Chamber Music Competition, and was a recipient of the 2014 Salon de Virtuosi grant.
