= New York New Music Ensemble =

The New York New Music Ensemble (NYNME) is an American contemporary music ensemble. Since 1976, the group has commissioned, performed and recorded works by both emerging and prominent living composers. Its performances have been featured at several major music festivals including the Ravinia Festival, the Santa Fe Chamber Music Festival, June in Buffalo, the Pacific Rim Music Festival, and the Thailand International Composition Festival (TICF). NYNME has also been recognized and supported by many significant American foundations, including the Jerome Foundation, the Fromm Foundation at Harvard, the Mary Flagler Cary Foundation, the Mellon Foundation, the Koussevitzky Foundation, and the NEA and NYSCA. The group has held numerous residencies at universities, such as Rice University, Emory University, Brandeis University, the University of Wisconsin–Madison, the University of Pittsburgh, and Princeton's Institute for Advanced Study. Over the years, NYNME has premiered over 140 works, the vast majority of which were written specifically for the group. Among the prominent composers with whom the group has enjoyed longstanding associations are Elliott Carter, Jacob Druckman, Charles Wuorinen, Mario Davidovsky, Harvey Sollberger, Joan Tower, George Perle, Rand Steiger, John Eaton, and David Felder. The group's activities have also included tours in Europe, Asia, and South America.

Current members include: flutist Emi Ferguson, clarinetist Jean Kopperud, violinist Linda Quan, cellist Chris Finckel, pianist Stephen Gosling, and percussionist Daniel Druckman.

Patricia Leonard has served as the Managing Director since 2019.

== Previous membership ==
The New York New Music Ensemble was founded in 1975 by conductor Robert Black, along with flutist Jayn Rosenfeld (who served as the ensemble's Executive Director between 1993 and 2013), clarinetist Laura Flax, violinist Gregory Fulkerson, cellist Eric Bartlett, and pianist Alan Feinberg. Percussionist Daniel Druckman joined in the early 1980s.

Other musicians associated with the group include Curtis Macomber, Elizabeth DiFelice, Cameron Grant, James Winn, Jeffrey Milarsky, Calvin Wiersma, James Baker, and Susan Narucki.

== Commissioned works ==
- Kathryn Alexander, "As Once the Winged Energy of Delight"
- Kristi Allik, "Trio"
- Milton Babbitt, "Playing for Time"
- Milton Babbitt, "Souper"
- Milton Babbitt, "When Shall We Three Meet Again" (1997)
- Thomas Barker, "10/22 (R-681.7)" (1981)
- Thomas Barker, "Samenwerking"
- Leslie Bassett, "Wolken"
- Ross Bauer, "Implicit Memory" (2007)
- Ross Bauer, "Stone Soup" (1996)
- Eve Beglarian, "Making Sense of It" (1987)
- Arthur Berger, "Composition for Piano 4-Hands"
- Harrison Birtwistle, "Crescent Moon over the Irrational" (2010)
- Harrison Birtwistle, "Fantasia upon all the notes" (2011)
- Harrison Birtwistle, "Trio" (2010)
- Robert Black, "Foramen Habet!"
- Susan Blaustein, "Out of Pandora's Box"
- Susan Blaustein, "Sextet" (1983)
- Linda Bouchard, "Sept Couleurs" (1993)
- Martin Boykan, "Echoes of Petrarch" (1992)
- Frank Brickle, "Stolen Kisses" (1983)
- William Brooks, "Makers, A Theatrical Piece for Instrumentalists" (1992)
- Elizabeth Brown, "Liguria"
- Elizabeth Brown, "The Memory Palace" (1990)
- John Cage, "Music for Six" (1984)
- Ann Callaway, "Devachan" (1992)
- Edmund Campion, "A Treasured Collection of Eddies" (1992)
- Edmund Campion, "Losing Touch"
- Edmund Campion, "Musica" (1997)
- Elliott Carter, "Con Leggerezza Pensosa"
- Eric Chasalow, "On that Swirl of Ending Dust" (2012)
- Shih-Chan Mark Cheng, "Chiaroscuro"
- Chou Wen-chung, "Ode to Eternal Pine" (2009)
- Louis Fujinami Conti, "Reflections from the Mirror of Time"
- David Cope, "Quartet" (2009)
- Anthony Cornicello, "Le Città Invisibili III: Beersheba" (1996)
- Paul Cooper, "Landschaft"
- Eleanor Cory, "Mirrors" (2005)
- Alan Cox, "Metamorphoses"
- James Dashow, "Ashbery Setting" (1972, rev. 1988)
- Mario Davidovsky, "Flashbacks"
- Jonathan Dawe, "All Kinds of Time"
- Stephen Demsbki, "Alba"
- Stephen Dembski, "Trio"
- Dr. Narongrit Dharmabutra, "Quartet"
- Robert Dick, "A New Prehistory" (2001)
- Jacob Druckman, "Come Round" (1992)
- John Eaton, "Don Quixote, A Theatre Piece for Musicians" (1997)
- John Eaton, "Let's Get This Show on the Road! (An Alternate View of Genesis)"
- John Eaton, "Peer Gynt" (1991)
- John Eaton, "Pinocchio, A Romp for Instrumentalists" (2004)
- Jason Eckardt, "Rendition" (2006)
- George Edwards, "Sonda"
- George Edwards, "The Isle Is Full of Noises" (1995)
- George Edwards, "Veiner Variety"
- Aaron Einbond, "Together and Apart" (1997)
- David Felder, "Partial /dist/ re/s/ toration" (2001)
- David Felder, "Rare Air" (2008)
- Richard Festinger, "A Dream Foretold" (2001)
- Richard Festinger, "A Serenade for Six" (1993)
- Vivian Fine, "Canticles from the Other Side of the River" (1993)
- David Froom, "Chamber Concerto" (1991)
- David Froom, "Duettino" (2002)
- Michel Galante, "First Etude in Speeds" (2010)
- Miriam Gideon, "Boehmischer Krystal"
- David Glaser, "Catalyst" (2007)
- Matthew Greenbaum, "Into the Cleft of Streets" (1996)
- Murray Gross, "Quintet"
- Elliot Gyger, "Polishing Firewood" (2001)
- John Harbison, "Im Spiegel"
- Donald Harris, "Der Koch"
- David Hicks, "Currents"
- Gerard Humel, "Winter's Ghost"
- Andrew Imbrie, "Pilgrimage" (1983)
- Stephen Jaffe, "Rhythm of the Running Plough" (1984–85)
- Arthur Jarvinen, "Isoluminaries" (1996)
- Scott Johnson, "Practical Music for Single Women" (1989)
- Stuart Jones, "Transmogrifications III" (2001)
- Thomas Kessler, "Piano Control"
- Emily Koh, "bridging isolation" (2013)
- Barbara Kolb, "Extremes"
- Dina Koston, "Quintet with Claves" (2007)
- Arthur Kreiger, "Connective Tissue" (2005)
- Arthur Kreiger, "Meeting Places" 1996)
- Oliver Lake, "Flirtation Blue" (1994)
- John Anthony Lennon, "Red Scimitar" (2004)
- Peter Lieberson, "Tolling Piece"
- David Liptak, "Giovane Vaghi" (1996)
- David Liptak, "Janus Variations" (1999)
- David Liptak, "Rhapsodies"
- Zhou Long, "Cloud Earth" (2012)
- Alexandre Lunsqui, "Toy" (2013)
- Tod Machover, "Toward the Center" (1988)
- Tod Machover, "Yoku Mireba"
- Stephen Mackey, "Micro-Concerto for percussion" (1999)
- Donald Martino, "Trio"
- Diana McIntosh, "Time and Again, A Theatre Piece" (1998)
- William Thomas McKinley, "A Different Drummer" (1989)
- William Thomas McKinley, "Ancient Memories"
- William Thomas McKinley, "Jean's Dream" (1987)
- Arne Mellnäs, "Gardens" (1986)
- Eric Moe, "Grand Prismatic" (2007)
- Eric Moe, "Superhero" (2006)
- Stephen Mosko, "Schweres Loos"
- Jeffrey Mumford, "Jewels Beyond the Mist" (1988)
- James Newton, "Violet" (1997)
- David Olan, "Phantasm"
- Harold Oliver, "Digressions" (1999)
- Harold Oliver, "Suchness" (1999)
- Pablo Ortiz, "Story Time" (1996)
- Joan Panetti, "Crystals"
- Mario Pelusi, "A Narrative for Expanded Pierrot Ensemble" (2005)
- George Perle, "Critical Moments" (1997)
- Wayne Peterson, "Rhapsody" (1976)
- Wayne Peterson, "Vicissitudes" (1995)
- Tobias Picker, "The Blue Hula"
- Michael Poast, "Color Music: Toccata and Fugue"
- Mel Powell, "Sextet" (1996)
- Narong Prangchoroen, "Quintet"
- James Primosch, "Danse Movements"
- James Primosch, "Icons"
- James Primosch, "Sacra Conversazione" (1994)
- James Primosch, "Times Like These" (2008)
- Roger Reynolds, "Not Only Night"
- Steve Ricks, "Amygdala" (2008)
- Steve Ricks, "Mild Violence" (2005)
- Marina Rosenfeld, "flutescene" (2000)
- Marina Rosenfeld, "Rings/Black Circles" (2008)
- Morris Rosenzweig, "Past Light" (2005)
- Morris Rosenzweig, "Rough Sleepers" (2007)
- C. Bryan Rulon, "Disorderly Lullabies" (1996)
- Leonin/C. Bryan Rulon, "Divine Detours" (1993)
- C. Bryan Rulon, "Res Facta" (1991)
- Jeremy Sagala, "Tenebrae" (2009)
- Paul Schoenfield, "Trio for Clarinet, Violin and Piano"
- Harvey Sollberger, "Nemesis" (2008)
- Harvey Sollberger, "Obsessions" (2008)
- Harvey Sollberger, "The Advancing Moment"
- Harvey Sollberger, "To a Spirit Unappeased and Peregrine"
- Harvey Sollberger, "Trickster Tales"
- Nicholas Thorne, "Songs from the Mountain" (1986)
- Alex Tooker, "Invitation to the Dance"
- Joseph Schwantner, "Music of Amber" (1980–81)
- Ralph Shapey, "Three for Six" (1979)
- Dorrance Stalvey, "Exordium/Genesis/Dawn" (1990)
- Bruce Taub, "Adrian's Dream" (1997)
- Annelies Van Parys, Fragrances (2008)
- Yiorgos Vassilandonakis, "Quatour pour la fin d'une ére" (2012)
- Ezequiel Viñao, "Viento Blanco" (2010)
- Melinda Wagner, "Wick"
- Alicyn Warren, "HAZMAT"
- Barbara White, "the mind's fear, the heart's delight" (1997)
- Julia Wolfe, "Girlfriend" (1998)
- Mary Wright, "Sunflower" (1994)
- Charles Wuorinen, "Katz Fugue" (1996)
- Charles Wuorinen, "Metagong" (2009)
- Charles Wuorinen, "New York Notes" (1981–82)
- Charles Wuorinen, "New York Notes" (revised version with tape) (1982–84)
- Charles Wuorinen, "The Great Procession" (1996)
- Charles Wuorinen, "Trio for Flute, Bass Clarinet and Piano" (2009)
- Charles Wuorinen, "Twang" (1991)
- James Yannatos, "Eight Haiku" (1991)
- Rolf Yttrehus, "Sextet II" (2006)

== Complete discography ==
- 2016 Lukas Foss, "Solo Observed", "Echoi", "Tashi" on Albany Records (forthcoming in 2016)
- 2015 Jonathan Harvey, "The Riot", "Cirrus Light", "Piano Trio", "Be(com)ing" on Albany Records Troy 1566.
- 2014 Richard Festinger, "Laws of Motion", "Diary of a Journey", "A Dream Foretold", and "The Coming of Age" on Naxos 8.559399.
- 2014 Charles Wuorinen, "Metagong", "Trio", "Sonata", and "Janissary Music" on Albany Records Troy 1497.
- 2009 Eun Young Lee, "A Quiet Way" on Capstone Records 8809.
- 2010 Morris Rosenzweig, "Past Light" on Albany Records Troy 1216.
- 2008 Eleanor Cory, "Chasing Time" on Albany Records Troy 1031.
- 2008 Craig Walsh, "Bugaboo" and "0 to 33 in 1098.5" on Albany Records Troy 1047.
- 2007 Ross Bauer, "Stone Soup" and "Tributaries" on Albany Records Troy 921.
- 2002 Arthur Kreiger, "Meeting Places", "Caprice", "Voyage", "Uncommon Bonds", "In Short Crystal Moments", "Close Encounters", "Dialogue for Steel Drums and Electronic Tape", and "Suitable Attachments" on Albany Records Troy 609.
- 2002 Eleanor Cory, "Of Mere Being" on CRI CD 885.
- 2001 Barbara White, "the mind's fear, the heart's delight" on CRI CD 883.
- 2000 David Felder, "A Pressure Triggering Dreams" on Mode Records.
- 2000 Wayne Peterson, "Diptych", "Labyrinth", "Vicissitudes", "Capriccio", and "Duodecaphony" on Koch International 3-7498-2.
- 2000 Mario Davidovsky, "Flashbacks" on Bridge Records 9097.
- 1999 Chen Yi, "Near Distance" on CRI CD 804.
- 1998 James Primosch, "Sacra Conversazione"; C. Bryan Rulon, "Res Facta"; Rand Steiger, "Thirteen Loops" on Centaur CRC 2338.
- 1998 David Froom, "To Dance to the Whistling Wind" and "Chamber Concerto" on Arabesque Recordings Z6710.
- 1997 Louis Karchin, "Galactic Folds" on CRI CD 739.
- 1996 Elliott Carter, "Triple Duo"; Peter Maxwell Davies, "Ave Maris Stella"; Jacob Druckman, "Come Round" on CRI CD 739.
- 1992 Arnold Schoenberg, "Pierrot lunaire" on GM Recordings GM2030CD.
- 1992 Neil B. Rolnick, "ElectriCity" on O.C. Records 0.0.8.
- 1991 Miriam Gideon, "Boehmischer Krystall" on New World Recordings 80393.
- 1990 Tod Machover, "Towards the Center" on Bridge Records CD 9020.
- 1990 Susan Blaustein, "Sextet"; Joseph Schwantner, "Music of Amber"; Charles Wuorinen, "New York Notes" on GM Recordings GM2028CD.
- 1989 Stephen Dembski, "Alba" on CRI CD 570.
- 1984 Ralph Shapey, "Three for Six" on CRI SD509.
- 1983 David Chaitkin, "Serenade" on CRI SD493/CD749.
- 1978 George Edwards, Veined Variety on Opus 1.
