= Septet (Chick Corea album) =

Studio album by Chick Corea
- Released: November 1985
- Recorded: October 1984
- Studio: Mad Hatter Studios; Los Angeles, California
- Genre: Jazz
- Length: 39:38
- Label: ECM 1297
- Producer: Chick Corea

Chick Corea chronology
Voyage (1985)	Septet (1985)	Trio Music Live in Europe (1986)

Septet is an album by pianist Chick Corea recorded in October 1984 and released on ECM November the following year. the septet features flautist Steve Kujala and French horn player Peter Gordon with a string quartet featuring violinists Ida Kavafian and Theodore Arm, violist Steven Tenenbom, and cellist Fred Sherry.

== Reception and accolades ==
Professional ratings
Review scores
Source	Rating
AllMusic	2/5 stars
The Penguin Guide to Jazz	2/4 stars

The AllMusic review awarded the album 2 stars. The Penguin Guide to Jazz described it as "Po-faced and slight".

The album received a Grammy nomination for Best Contemporary Composition.

== Track listing ==
All compositions by Chick Corea

1. "1st Movement" - 1:57
2. "2nd Movement" - 2:20
3. "3rd Movement" - 8:08
4. "4th Movement" - 5:31
5. "5th Movement" - 9:58
6. "The Temple of Isfahan" - 13:49

== Personnel ==
- Chick Corea – piano
- Steve Kujala – flute
- Peter Gordon – French horn
- Ida Kavafian – violin
- Theodore Arm – violin
- Steven Tenenbom – viola
- Fred Sherry – cello
