= Voyage (Chick Corea album) =

Studio album by Chick Corea & Steve Kujala
- Released: March 1985
- Recorded: July 1984
- Genre: Jazz, post-bop
- Length: 45:19
- Label: ECM 1282
- Producer: Manfred Eicher

Chick Corea chronology
Children's Songs (1984)	Voyage (1985)	Septet (1985)

Professional ratings
Review scores
Source	Rating
AllMusic	2/5 stars
The Penguin Guide to Jazz Recordings	2/4 stars

Voyage is an album by American pianist Chick Corea and American flautist Steve Kujala recorded in July 1984 and released on ECM March the following year.

== Track listing ==
Side one
No.	Title	Writer(s)	Length
1.	"Mallorca"	Chick Corea	10:48
2.	"Diversions"	Corea, Steve Kujala	12:57

Side two
No.	Title	Writer(s)	Length
1.	"Star Island"	Corea	5:33
2.	"Free Fall"	Corea, Kujala	8:30
3.	"Hong Kong"	Corea	7:41

== Personnel ==
- Chick Corea – piano, keyboards
- Steve Kujala – flute

=== Production ===
- Manfred Eicher – producer
- Martin Wieland – engineer
- Barbara Wojirsch – cover design
- Chick Corea – liner notes
