= David Felder =

American composer and academic (born 1953)

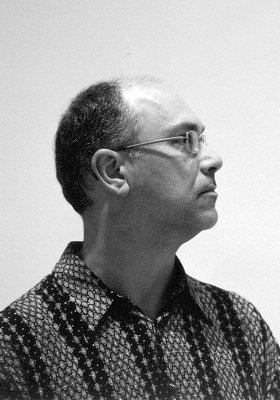
- Felder in 2013
- Born: November 27, 1953 (age 72); Cleveland, Ohio, U.S.

Academic background
- Education: Miami University (BM, MM); University of California, San Diego (PhD)
- Doctoral advisor: Roger Reynolds; Bernard Rands; Robert Erickson; Joji Yuasa
- Other advisor: Donald Erb

Academic work
- Discipline: Music
- Sub-discipline: Music composition
- Institutions: Cleveland Institute of Music; Buffalo Philharmonic Orchestra; Atlantic Center for the Arts; University at Buffalo

David Felder (born November 27, 1953) is an American composer and academic who was a SUNY Distinguished Professor at the University at Buffalo until his retirement in 2023. He was also the director of the June in Buffalo Festival and the Robert and Carol Morris Center for 21st Century Music and the Founding Director of the Slee Sinfonietta Professional Chamber Orchestra.

== Early life and education ==
Felder was born in Cleveland, Ohio on November 27, 1953, and joined the Cleveland Orchestra Chorus as a late teenager, where he sang as a tenor . He received a Bachelor of Music in 1975 and a Master of Music in 1977, both from Miami University. During his time there he trained as a composer and theorist, and as a choral conductor, while also teaching electronic music. Felder spent the next two years in Cleveland teaching electronic music and recording at the Cleveland Institute of Music and studying composition privately with Donald Erb, while participating in contemporary music concerts in Cleveland as sound technician for the group "Reconnaisance". Felder earned a PhD in music composition at the University of California, San Diego, where he studied with Roger Reynolds, Bernard Rands, Robert Erickson, and Joji Yuasa. He taught as a part-time faculty member in electronic music, and conducted the UCSD Concert Choir. In 1982 he begin teaching full time at California State University where he taught all levels of theory and composition, co-produced the New Music Concert Series, inaugurated and funded the InterArts Festival, as well as the Long Beach Summer Composers' Institute. In 1985 he accepted a position at University at Buffalo, where he taught from 1985 through 2023, and initiated a large number of professional projects in the production of events and festivals.

== Career ==
Felder was the Composer-in-Residence of the Buffalo Philharmonic Orchestra from 1993 to 1997 and has received numerous grants and commissions throughout his career as a composer, including many awards from the National Endowment for the Arts, two New York State Council commissions, a New York Foundation for the Arts Fellowship, a Guggenheim Fellowship, two Koussevitzky commissions, two Fromm Foundation Fellowships, two awards from the Rockefeller Foundation, two commissions from the Mary Flagler Cary Trust, and many more. In 2010, the American Academy of Arts and Letters awarded Felder the Music Award in recognition of his career accomplishments.

Felder taught music composition at the University at Buffalo from 1985 to 2023 entirely for Ph.D. Composition students, received the SUNY Distinguished Professor title in 2008, and served as Master Artist in Residence at the Atlantic Center for the Arts in 2010. His, Les Quatres Temps Cardinaux (2013–14), for chamber orchestra, soprano, bass voice, and electronics, has been recorded by the Boston Modern Orchestra Project and also by Ensemble Signal with the Slee Sinfonietta, Brad Lubman conductor on Coviello. More recently, his violin concerto, Jeu de Tarot project(2017–22), with violin soloist Irvine Arditti, and Ensemble Signal, conducted by Brad Lubman, has been recorded and released on Coviello Contemporary records. and Jeu de Tarot 2 recorded and released on Coviello in January 2025. His latest work for orchestra, Die Dämmerungen, was given its complete world premiere by the Buffalo Philharmonic Orchestra on October 5, 2019, at Kleinhans Music Hall. Jeu de Tarot 2 (2020) has been recently recorded by the Slee Sinfonietta, with violin soloist Irvine Arditti, conducted by Christian Baldini, and has been released.

=== June in Buffalo Festival ===
The June in Buffalo Festival was founded at the University at Buffalo in 1975 by composer and UB Professor Morton Feldman, with sponsorship by the Rockefeller Foundation, New York State Council for the Arts, and the university at Buffalo. The festival was originally modeled upon the Darmstadt Festival with younger composers present for seminars and concerts of music by distinguished established composers. The festival ran until 1979 and was defunct - until 1985 when David Felder revived the festival when he joined the faculty at the university.

From 1985 to 2022, Felder was the director of June in Buffalo, and significantly expanded the program to feature world-class performances of work by emerging composers, side-by-side with distinguished established world-class composers. June in Buffalo has run every June since 1985, and offers a week-long intensive schedule of seminars, lectures, workshops, professional presentations, participant forums and open rehearsals as well as afternoon and evening concerts open to the general public and critics. Each of the invited composers has one of their pieces performed during the festival. Evening performances feature faculty composers, resident ensembles and soloists renowned internationally as interpreters of contemporary music.

Slee Sinfonietta The Slee Sinfonietta, professional chamber orchestra-in-residence at the Center for 21st Century Music which Felder founded in 1996, 10 years earlier than the inception of the Center, as the centerpiece resident group. The first conductor was Magnus Martensson. The Slee Sinfonietta is the professional chamber orchestra in residence at the university at Buffalo and presents a series of concerts each year that feature performances of challenging new works by contemporary composers and lesser-known works from the chamber orchestra repertoire. The Slee Sinfonietta consists of a core group including UB faculty performance artists, visiting artists, national and regional professionals and advanced performance students, and conducted by leading conductors and composers.

==== Center for 21st Century Music ====
The June in Buffalo Festival enjoys sponsorship from the Robert and Carol Morris Center for 21st Century Music, which Felder founded in 2006, and acted as artistic director until his retirement in 2022.

==== Creative Arts Initiative ====
In 2015 he was named co-director of the university at Buffalo's Creative Arts Initiative, a plan to bring major international creative artists to the region as guest artists.

== Published works ==
All works are published by the Theodore Presser Company and Schott Music.

=== Orchestra and chamber orchestra ===
- Among for orchestra (unperformed) 2023
- Die Dämmerungen for orchestra (complete premiere date October 2019)
- Les Quatre Temps Cardinaux for large chamber orchestra, solo soprano, solo bass, electronics, 2013-14
- Tweener for small chamber orchestra, solo percussionist, 8 channel electronics, 2010
- Gone grey for chamber string orchestra, 2003
- In Between for solo percussion and chamber orchestra, 2000
- a pressure triggering dreams for orchestra, 1997, revised 1998
- Three Pieces for Orchestra 1996, score revised 2008
- Linebacker Music for orchestra, 1994
- Six Poems from Neruda's Alturas... for orchestra, 1990–92, revised 1998
- Journal for chamber orchestra, 1990
- Between for solo percussion and large orchestra, 1990
- La Dura Fria Hora for chamber chorus and orchestra, 1986
- Three Lines from Twenty Poems for chamber orchestra, 1987
- Coleccion Nocturna, for clarinet (=bcl), piano, orchestra, optional tape, 1984

=== Choral ===
- Nomina Sunt Consequentia Rerum for choir, 2012
- Memento mori for 16 voice mixed chorus, 2004
- La Dura Fria Hora for voices, a cappella, 1986

=== Large ensemble ===
- Jeu de Tarot 2 for solo violin, flute, clarinet, oboe, horn, bass trombone, perc., harp, piano/keyboard, vln., vla., vc., bass, electronics, 2020-2022
- Jeu de Tarot for solo violin, flute, clarinet, oboe, horn, perc., harp, piano/keyboard, vln., vla., vc., bass, electronics, 2017
- Requiescat for bass flute, contrabass clarinet, perc., guitar, piano/celeste, 2 vlns., vla., vc.. bass, 8 channels of electronics, 2010
- Dionysiacs for flute ensemble (6 players), and ‘gli altri’ (minimum 14), 2005
- Partial [Dist]res[s]toration for ensemble, 2002
- Inner Sky for flute (doubling piccolo, alto, bass), two percussion, piano, strings, computer, 1994, revised 1998
- Passageways IIa for ensemble, 1991
- Passageways II for ensemble, 1980

=== Brass ===
- Canzona for brass ensemble (4,4,3,1), 2017
- shredder for brass ensemble (13 players), timpani, electric bass, 2001
- Incendio for brass dectet (arranged with Jon Nelson), 2000
- Canzone XXXI for two trumpets, horn, trombone, bass trombone, 1993

=== String quartet ===
- Netivot for string quartet, 2016
- Stuck-stücke for string quartet, 2007, revised 2009
- Third Face for string quartet, 1988

=== Electronics ===
- Green Flash for 6 channels of electronic sound, 2012
- So Quiet Here for four channels of electronic sound, 2006
- RRRings t{h}RRR(o)u[gh]e for 8 channels of electronic sound, 2004

=== Solo and small ensemble ===
- Three Songs from Three Watches, 2014
- A Garland (for Bruce) for solo cello, 4, 6, or 8 channels of electronic sound, 2012
- Rare Air for solo bass clarinet, piano and electronics, 2008
- Insomnia for solo bass voice and percussion, 2008
- Black Fire/White Fire (part 3 of Shamayim) for solo bass voice, video, 8 channels electronics, 2008
- Sa’arah (part 2 of Shamayim) for solo bass voice, 8 channel electronics, video, 2007
- Chashmal (part 1 of Shamayim) for solo bass voice, 8 channels of electronics, optional video, 2006
- TweeenerB for solo percussion (including KAT mallet controller), and electronics, 1995, revised 2013
- November Sky for flute doubling piccolo, alto, bass flutes, can be presented as media work with video walls (16 monitors each) and video playback, 1992
- Crossfire for trombone, violin, flute, percussion; consists of four individual works: Boxman, Another Face, November Sky, and In Between; each work may be presented with or without video, 1986–92
- Boxman for amplified solo trombone with MaxMSP processing, can also be presented as media work with two Delcom video walls (16 monitors each) and video playback, 1986–88, revised 1999
- Another Face for solo violin, can be presented as media work with two Delcom video walls (16 monitors each) and video playback, 1987
- Coleccion Nocturna for clarinet (=bcl), piano, tape, 1983
- Rocket Summer for solo piano, 1979, revised 1983
- Rondage/Cycle for trumpet (trombone) with amplification/delay, piano, percussion, digital synthesizer, tape, 1977, revised with choreography and synclavier II digital synthesizer, 1983
- Nexus for solo bass trombone, 1975

== Discography ==
Felder's music is featured on several solo discs, and included on many albums released by individual artists and new music groups, as well as on a joint release with Morton Feldman. His works have been released on a variety of labels including Bridge Records, Mode Records, Albany Records, and others.

=== Solo releases ===
- ”Die Dämmerungen”, BMOP Singles 2001, November, 2025.
- Jeu de Tarot 2, Coviello Contemporary, January, 2025.
- Jeu de Tarot, Coviello Contemporary CD 91913, 2019. Jeu de Tarot, Netivot, and Another Face. Ensemble Signal, Brad Lubman, Arditti String Quartet, Irvine Arditti.
- Inner Sky, Albany Blu-ray surround 5.1 Troy 1418, 2013. Features 90 minutes of Felder's music spanning from 1979 to 2012, including Rare Air, Tweener, Requiescat, Incendio, Rocket Summer, Inner Sky, Canzone XXXI, and Dionysiacs.
- Boxman, Albany SACD 5.1 Troy 1153, 2009. BoxMan, partial [dist]res[s]toration, Memento Mori, and stuck-stücke. Arditti String Quartet, New York Virtuoso Singers, New York New Music Ensemble, Miles Anderson, James Baker.
- Shamayim, Albany DVD 5.1 Troy 1137, 2009. Nicholas Isherwood, bass voice, image by Elliot Caplan.
- a pressure triggering dreams, Mode CD 89, 2000. Six Poems from Neruda’s Alturas ..., a pressure triggering dreams, and Coleccion Nocturna. June in Buffalo Festival Orchestra, Magnus Martensson, Jean Kopperud, James Winn, Harvey Sollberger.
- The Music of David Felder, Bridge CD 0049, 1995. Three Lines from "Twenty Poems", Journal (June in Buffalo Chamber Orchestra), Third Face (Arditti String Quartet), Canzone XXXI (American Brass Quintet), November Sky (Rachel Rudich, flutist, with four-channel computer). Critic's Choice CD of the Year, 1997, American Record Guide and Buffalo News.

=== Releases with other artists ===
- The Age of Wire and String, edition NEO, 2011. Released by the Norbotten NEO Ensemble, features Partial [dist]res[s]toration.
- Extreme Measures, Albany Records CD Troy 1217–18, 2010. Includes rare air performed by Jean Kopperud, clarinet, Stephen Gosling, piano.
- Blooming Sounds, Albany Records CD Troy 210, 2006. Includes Another Face.
- Metallafonic, Blue Bison Records CD002, 2006. Includes Shredder and Incendio.
- Felder-Feldman, EMF CD 033, 2001. Coleccion Nocturna (orchestral version), and In Between. Also contains premier recordings of Morton Feldman's Viola in My Life IV, and Instruments II, produced by Felder.

== Notable students ==
As an active teacher and mentor, he has served as Ph.D. dissertation advisor for over eighty composers at Buffalo, many of whom are actively teaching, composing and performing internationally at leading institutions.
