= Douglas Leedy =

American composer, performer and music scholar

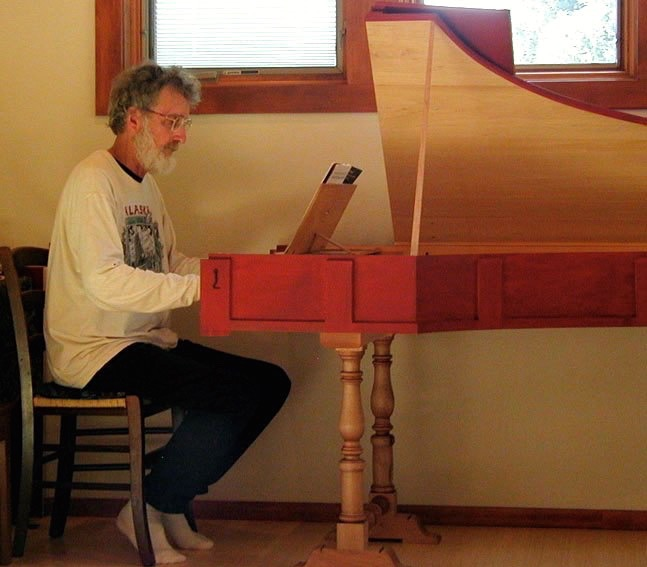
Douglas Leedy at the harpsichord

Douglas Leedy (March 3, 1938; Portland, Oregon – March 28, 2015; Corvallis, Oregon) was an American composer, performer and music scholar.

== Biography ==
Born in Portland, Oregon, Leedy studied with Karl Kohn at Pomona College and at the University of California, Berkeley, where he was in a composition seminar with membership including La Monte Young and Terry Riley. An orchestral hornist, harpsichordist, and singer, he studied South Indian music in Madras with K. V. Narayanaswamy, North Indian vocal music with Pandit Pran Nath, and was first music director of the Portland Baroque Orchestra and the musical director of the 1985 Portland Handel Festival, during which he conducted complete, period-instrument performances of Handel's oratorios Jephtha and Theodora. He taught music at UCLA, the Centro Simon Bolivar (Caracas), and at Reed College. He founded the electronic music studio at UCLA, and his synthesized music was among the earliest commissioned album-length recordings of the Moog Synthesizer and Buchla Synthesizer. The triple album Entropical Paradise was both the first triple album of synthesized "musical environments"—perhaps the first recording of explicitly ambient music—and featured modular analog synthesizer patches that, once set, played without further intervention by the performer. Excerpts from Entropical Paradise were also included in the soundtrack album to the film Slaughterhouse Five as atmospheric complements to the music by Bach that had been featured in the actual Glenn Gould-produced soundtrack.

Although briefly composing in an atonal, but not strictly serial, style, Leedy's music is predominantly melodic and modal. His music includes theatrical and spatial or environmental elements (Exhibition Music, Decay) and has deep relationships to early music (The Leaves be Green, Symphoniae Sacrae). He explored the relationship, in classical Greek and Latin, between text and music. In general, his music exhibits a lyrical, melodic style, and connects, through its use of modality, repetition, and intonation, to the same radical reassessment of musical materials and musical history underlying the movement that came to be known as minimalism, led by his colleagues Young and Riley. Following his studies in early Western music and Indian music, and following the same musical path as his west coast American models, Harry Partch and Lou Harrison, Leedy made a decisive turn away from 12-tone equal temperament. He was a scholar of tuning systems and composed for keyboard instruments in historical meantone temperament and in various systems of Just intonation. He also proposed reconstructions of ancient Greek music, and prepared, on historical-theoretic principles, settings for musical performance of Homer, Sappho, Pindar, and the Persai (The Persians) of Aeschylus.

His principal works include: Trio (1960) fl, hn, pf. Perspectives (1964) hn. Quintet 1964 cl, bn, tp, db, org. Antifonia (1965) 2tp,2tb. Decay (1965) theatre piece. Music for Percussion (1965) theatre piece. Usable Music for Very Small Instruments with Holes (1966). Usable Music II in B♭, (1966) chamber ensemble. 88 is Great (1969) pf 18 hands, Dulces exuviae (Dido's Lament after Virgil) (1969) ssaattbb. Teddy Bears Picnic (1969) theatre piece. Gloria (1970) s, satb, orch. Sebastian (1971–74) chamber opera. Music for Meantone Harpsichord (1974–86). Canti (1975) cb solo with fl, va, gui, mar, vib. Symphoniae sacrae (1976) ms, viola da gamba, hps. Hymns (Rg Veda)(1982) chorus, gamelan. Pastorale (1987) setting of an Ode of Horace for chorus and retuned piano in Just Intonation, four hands. Three Symphonies (1993) orch. without conductor, Piano Sonata 1994. Is This a Great Country, or What? (1995) multimedia. Hiroshima–Nagasaki 1945–2005 for tuned bowls or bells, crotales (2005). His extended piece Harpsichord Book, Part III: Toccata, UtReMiFaSolLa and Chorale For Harpsichord in Just Tuning uses a scordatura, set to a raga of his own invention, apam napat, or "Son of Water".

From 2003, most of his music appeared under the name Bhishma Xenotechnites, including his settings for voices and instruments, in Greek, of Homeric Hymns and other Greek and Latin lyrics, works such as Ein kleines Wagner Notizbuch (2005), a collage of Wagner quotations for the same ensemble as his 1965 octet Quaderno Rossiniano, and H5N1 (2006) for extremely high-pitched instruments or whistlers and antique cymbals.

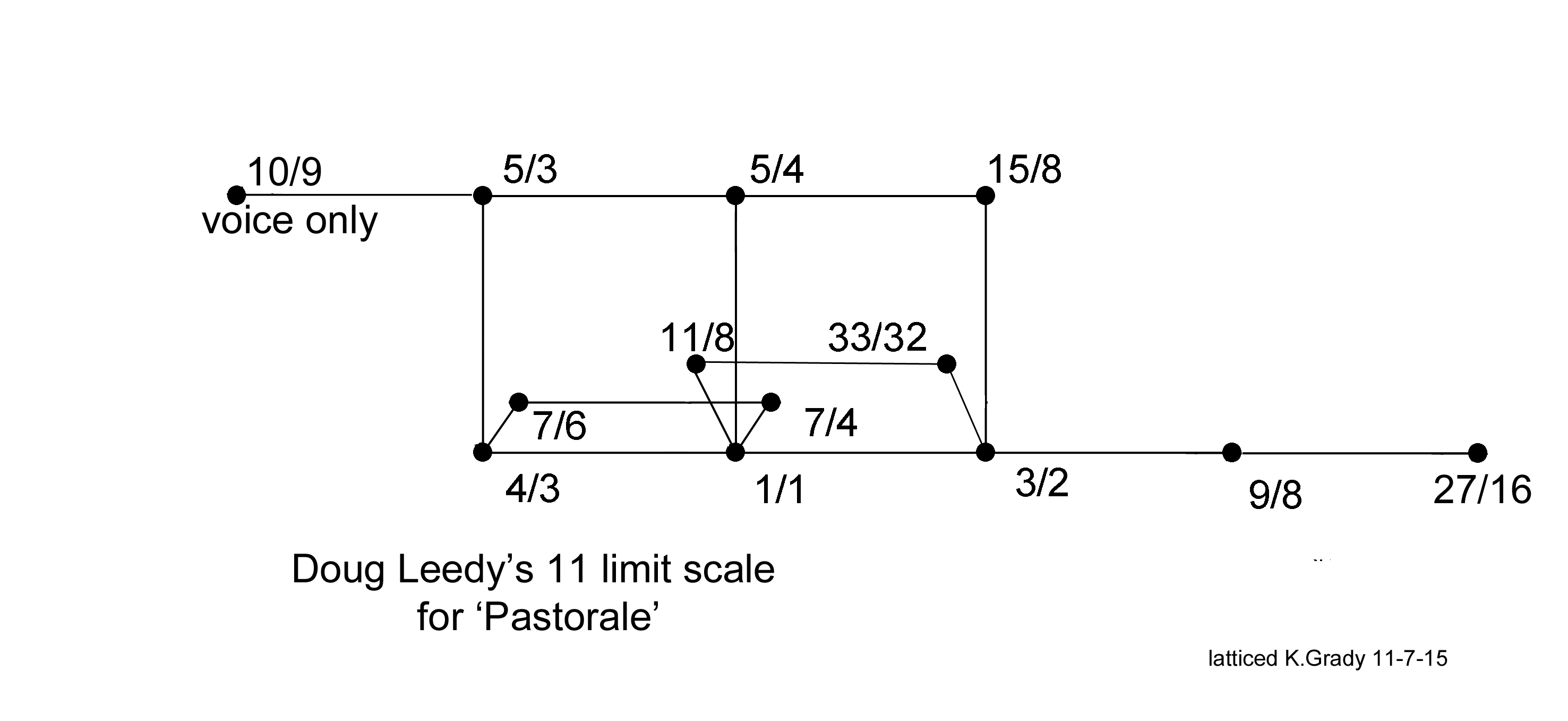
Douglas Leedy's 11 limit for his "Pastorale".

== Discography ==
- The Electric Zodiac (1969, Capitol)
- A Very Merry Electric Christmas to You! (1969, Capitol)
- Entropical Paradise (1971, Seraphim)
