= Stranahan Theater =

Concert hall in Toledo, Ohio

Stranahan Theater & Great Hall
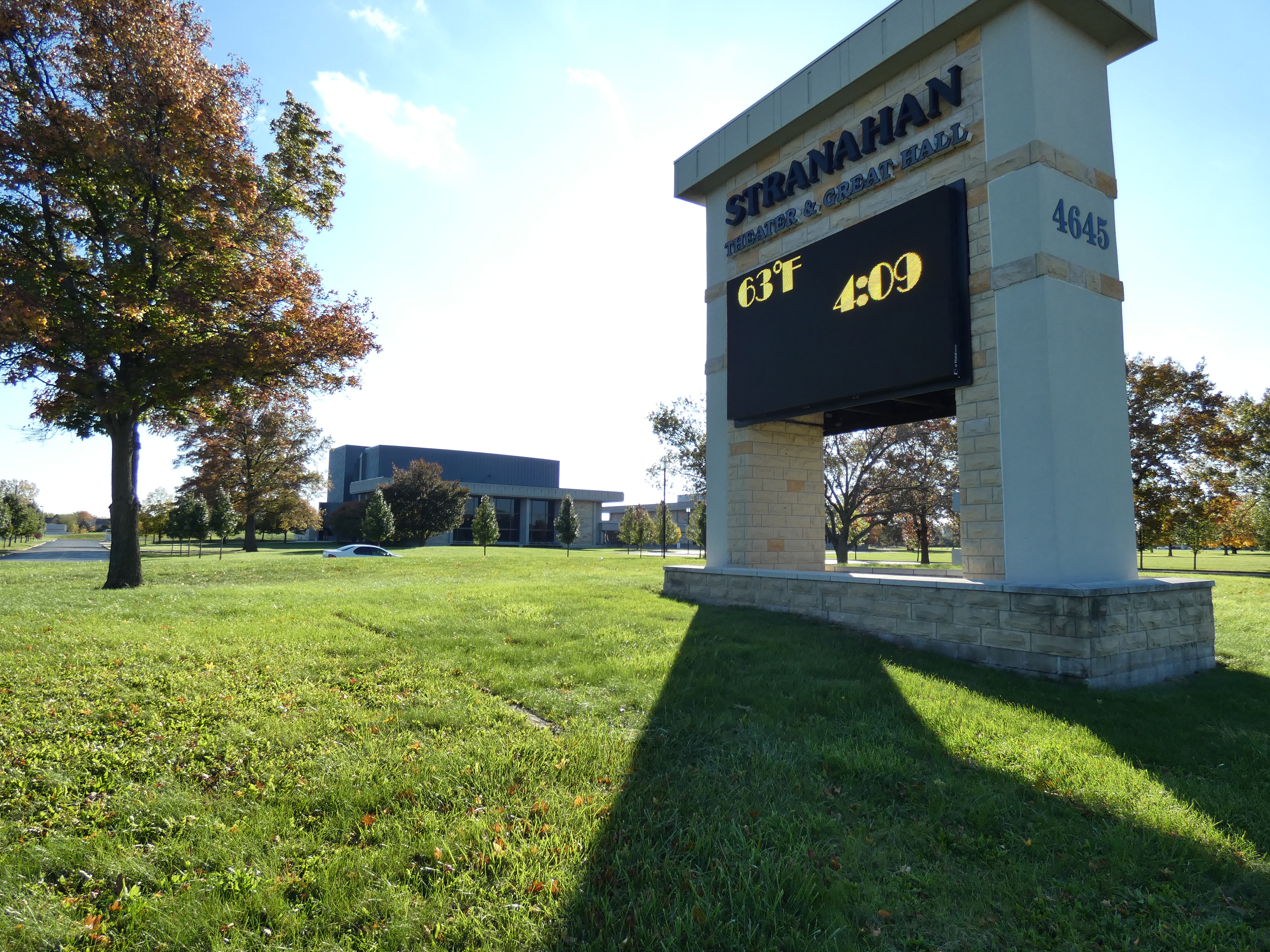
- Theater's sign with theater hall in background
- Interactive map of Stranahan Theater & Great Hall
- Former names: Masonic Auditorium (1969-94)
- Location: 4645 Heatherdowns Boulevard; Toledo, Ohio 43614
- Coordinates: 41°35′33″N 83°39′6″W
- Capacity: 2,368
- Type: Indoor theatre

Construction
- Built: 1969

Website
- stranahantheater.com

The Stranahan Theater & Great Hall, commonly known as the Stranahan Theater, is a concert hall located in Toledo, Ohio. The facility was constructed in 1969 and until the mid-1990s was called Masonic Auditorium because attached to the west side of the theater is a structure owned and occupied by several Masonic organizations. Part of the construction and maintenance costs have been funded by the Stranahan Foundation. Around the time of the name change, theater management began seeking more broad-based community funding.

The theater foyer is 3,000 square feet (280 m^{2}) and the adjacent Great Hall features 10,000 square feet (930 m^{2}) of meeting space. The property contains parking for 1,200 cars.

Fulfilling its primary usage as a concert venue, the Stranahan Theater presents approximately 170 theater events a year. Broadway shows sponsored by Theater League have included The Phantom of the Opera, Chicago, The Lion King and Wicked. It is also the site of Pops concerts by the Toledo Symphony Orchestra, The Nutcracker by the Toledo Ballet, and A Christmas Carol by the Toledo Rep. In addition, the Great Hall hosts over 140 banquets, receptions, and trade shows each year.

The Stranahan Theater is the largest proscenium stage in Northwest Ohio. It operates primarily as a rental house and is owned and operated by a 501c3 non-profit trust. Former executive directors include Penny Marks and Ward Whiting. Steve Hyman was named Executive Director in May 2014.
