= Microsymphony =

Single-movement orchestra composition

- by Charles Wuorinen
- Form: Orchestra
- Commissioned by: Philadelphia Orchestra
- Published: 1996: C.F. Peters Corporation
- Movements: one

The Microsymphony is a single-movement composition for orchestra by the American composer Charles Wuorinen. The work was commissioned by the Philadelphia Orchestra and was completed in 1992. The piece was a finalist for the 1994 Pulitzer Prize for Music.

== Composition ==
The Microsymphony has a duration of roughly 11 minutes and is composed in one continuous movement. The seemingly contradictory title refers to the composition's relatively brief length, which is uncommon for a traditional symphony.

=== Instrumentation ===
The work is scored for a large orchestra comprising four flutes (4th doubling piccolo), three oboes, three clarinets (3rd doubling bass clarinet), two bassoons, contrabassoon, four horns, three trumpets in C, two trombones, bass trombone, tuba, timpani, three percussionists, harp, piano, and strings.

== See also ==
- List of compositions by Charles Wuorinen
