= Ida Kavafian =

American violinist (born 1952)

Ida Kavafian (Armenian: Այտա Գավաֆեան) (born October 29, 1952, in Istanbul) is an American classical violinist and violist.

== Biography ==
Kavafian was born in Turkey to Armenian parents. She moved with her family to America in 1956, and began studying violin in Detroit at age six. Her teachers included Ara Zerounian, Mischa Mischakoff, Oscar Shumsky, and Ivan Galamian, the last two of which she studied under while attending the Juilliard School from 1969 to 1975. Her first major exposure came when she won the Vianna da Motta International Violin Competition in Lisbon in 1973. She won the Young Concert Artists International Auditions in 1978 which led to her New York recital debut at Carnegie Hall. That same year she became a member of the Tashi ensemble with Peter Serkin, who also accompanied her for her New York solo debut. She was awarded the silver medal (second place) at the inaugural International Violin Competition of Indianapolis in 1982.

She began performing with her sister, Ani Kavafian, in 1983, when the pair played together at Carnegie Hall. In 1983-84 she toured with Chick Corea. A member of the Chamber Music Society from 1989 to 1993 and from 1996 to 2002, she played with the Beaux Arts Trio from 1992 to 1998 and sporadically thereafter. She founded her own group, Opus One, in 1998, with Steven Tenenbom, Anne-Marie McDermott and Peter Wiley. She teaches at the Curtis Institute of Music, the Juilliard School and the Bard College Conservatory of Music. She plays a J. B. Guadagnini violin made in Milan in 1751, and a Moes and Moes viola, made in 1987.

Kavafian's repertory includes classical and early romantic works by Mozart, Beethoven, and Mendelssohn, as well as 20th century works of Ruth Crawford Seeger, Charles Wuorinen, and Toru Takemitsu. Takemitsu has composed a concerto for Kavafian. She is also the founder of two prestigious music festivals: the Bravo! Vail Valley Music Festival and the Music from Angel Fire.

== Discography ==
With Judith Blegen, Frederica von Stade and the Chamber Music Society of Lincoln Center

- Judith Blegen and Frederica von Stade: Songs, Arias and Duets (Columbia, 1975)

With Tashi

- Messiaen: Quartet for the End of Time (RCA Red Seal ARL1-1567, 1976)

With Chick Corea

- The Leprechaun (album with Chick Corea - Piano, Ida Kavafian - Violin) (Polydor, 1976)
- Children's Songs (album with Chick Corea - Piano, Fred Sherry - Cello, and Ida Kavafian - Violin) (ECM, 1984)
- Septet (ECM, 1984)

With Beaux Arts Trio

- Hummel Piano Trios (Philips, 289 446 077-2)
- Arensky Piano Trios (Philips, 289 442 127-2)

With Guarneri Quartet

- Mozart String Quintets Nos. 1, 3, 4, and 6 (RCA/Sony, 88691918042)

With Mark O'Connor

- Mark O'Connor String Quartets Nos. 2 & 3 (Omac, 2009)
