= Toledo Symphony Orchestra =

Toledo Alliance for the Performing Arts (TAPA)
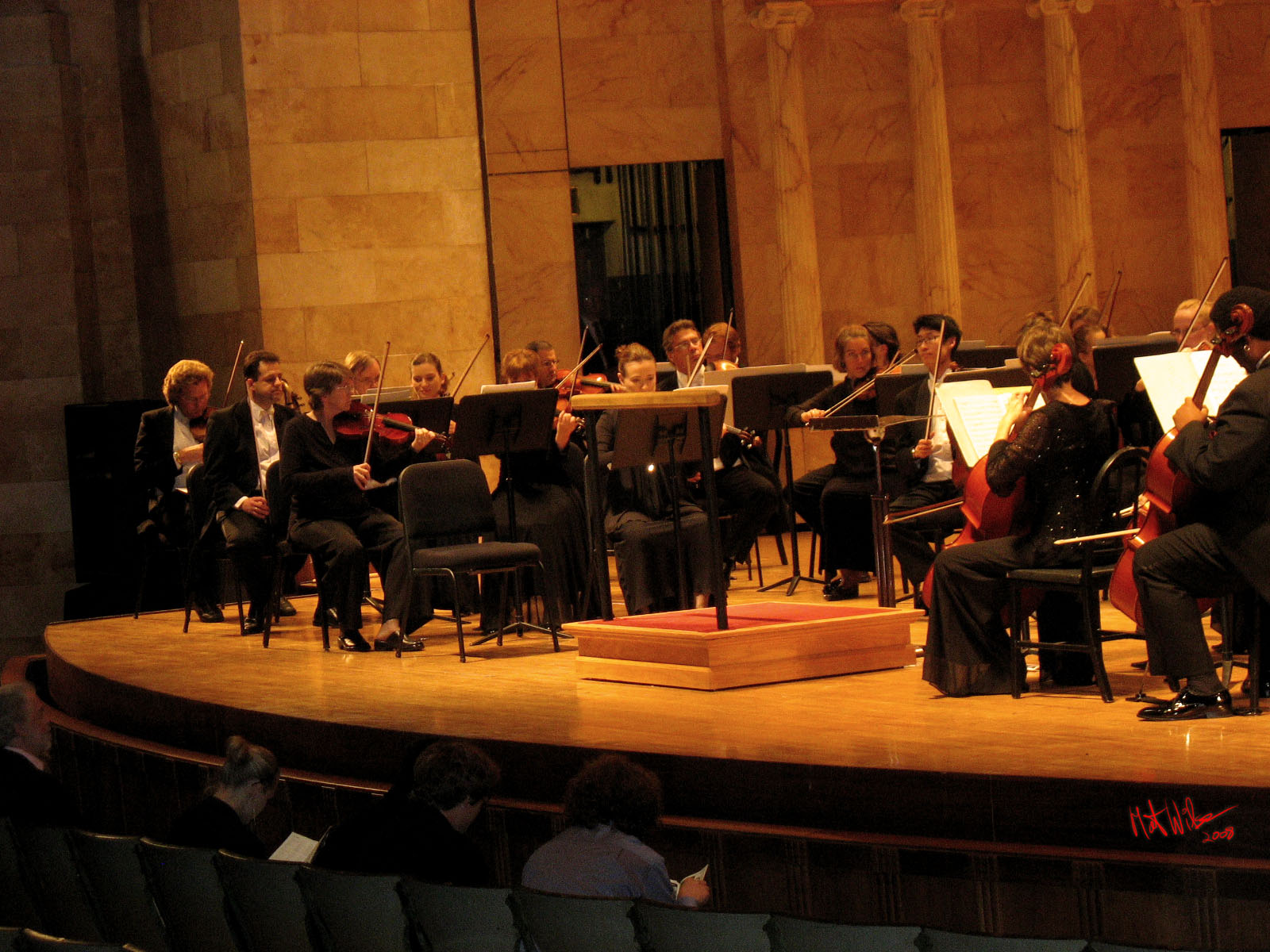

Background information
- Origin: Toledo, Ohio, United States
- Genres: Classical; Romantic; Modern
- Occupations: Symphony Orchestra; Ballet Company
- Years active: 2019–present
- Website: toledoballet.com toledosymphony.com

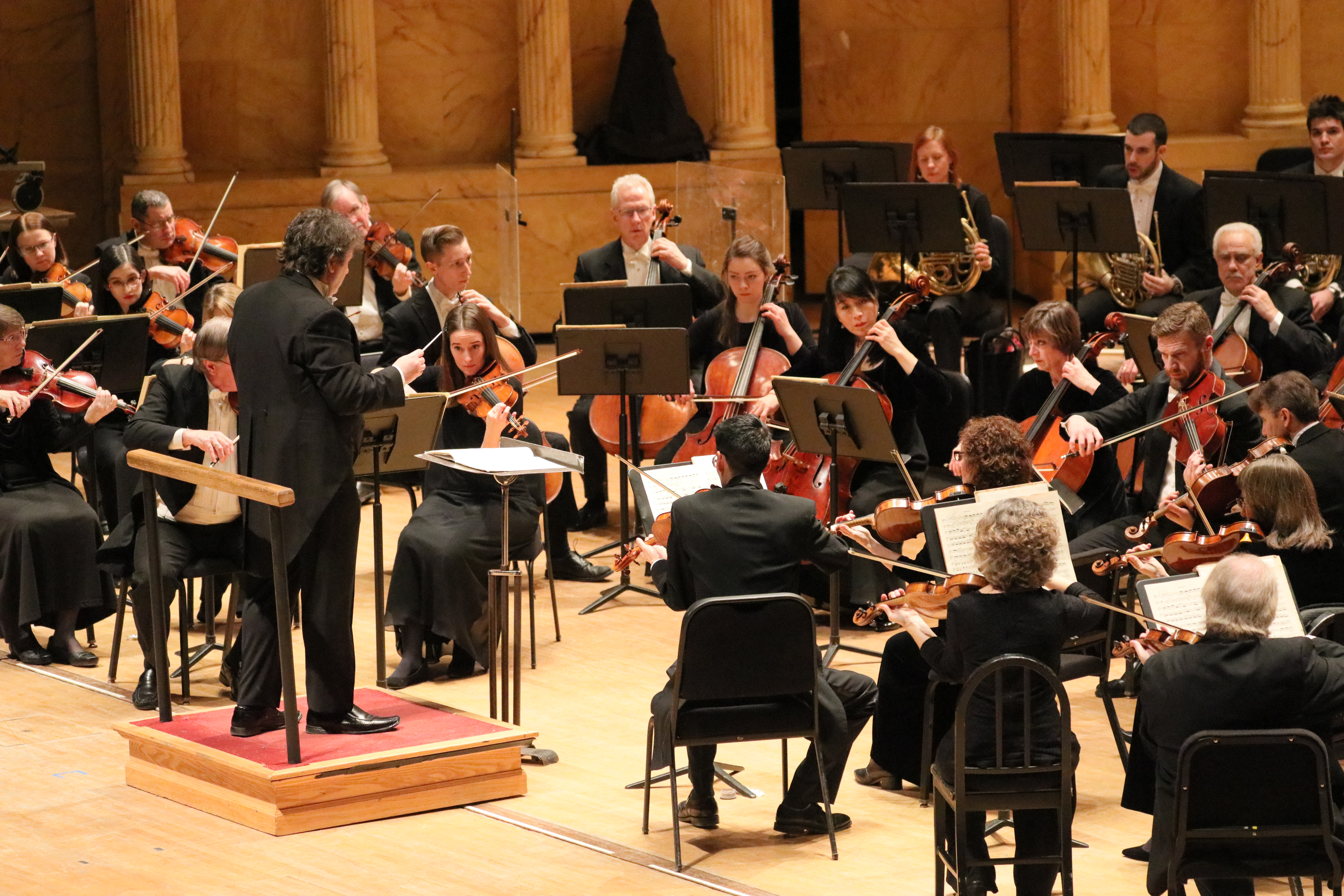
Toledo Symphony Orchestra

The Toledo Alliance for the Performing Arts was created in 2019 when the Toledo Symphony Orchestra and the Toledo Ballet merged. Based in Toledo, Ohio, it operated with a $13.2 million budget in its fiscal year 2020 and maintains the two brand names Toledo Symphony (sic) and Toledo Ballet, each with its own website. The orchestra part of TAPA performs at various venues, including the Toledo Museum of Art Peristyle Theater, the Valentine Theatre, the Toledo Club, the Stranahan Theater and some twenty churches and performing arts centers across the region.

== History of the orchestra part of TAPA ==
There were several early attempts to create the Toledo Symphony Orchestra. Arthur W. Kortheuer led an orchestra from 1897 to 1912 at several venues, including the Valentine Theatre. Successive ensembles briefly appeared in 1913–14 and 1916–17. Lewis H. Clement led an orchestra from 1920 to 1926, with concerts at Scott High School and other auditoriums. An orchestra performed for two seasons at the Paramount Theater, including a gala concert in May 1940 featuring Lily Pons. The orchestra began formally three years later as the "Friends of Music", giving its first concert on September 28, 1943, at Macomber Vocational High School; Edgar Schenkman was its first conductor, leading 22 musicians in a three-concert season.

=== Recent history ===
The orchestra's most recent principal conductor and artistic advisor was Stefan Sanderling. The orchestra initially appointed him as principal guest conductor, effective with the 2002–2003 season, with a contract of 2 years. The orchestra subsequently elevated his title to principal conductor, and Sanderling remained in the post from 2002 to 2017. During Sanderling's tenure, the orchestra made its Carnegie Hall debut in May 2011 as part of the 'Spring for Music' festival.

In March 2010, Alain Trudel first guest-conducted the orchestra. He returned to the podium again in April 2017 with Tchaikovsky's Fourth Symphony, and in June 2017, the orchestra announced the appointment of Trudel as its next music director, effective with the 2018–2019 season, with an initial contract of 3 years. He held the title of Music Director Designate during the 2017–2018 season.

=== List of music directors ===
- Edgar Schenkman (1943–1946)
- Hans Lange (1946–1949)
- Wolfgang Stresemann (1949–1955)
- Joseph Hawthorne (1955–1963)
- Serge Fournier (1964–1979)
- Joseph Silverstein (1979–1980; interim director)
- Yuval Zaliouk (1980–1989)
- Ole Schmidt (1989–1991; interim director)
- Andrew Massey (1991–2002)
- Stefan Sanderling (2003–2017)
- Alain Trudel (2018–present)

== History of the dance part of TAPA ==
Toledo Ballet was founded in 1939 by Marie Bollinger Vogt. Two years later the first production in the United States of Tchaikovsky's Nutcracker ballet took place in Toledo, with an orchestra, the Friends of Music, precursor to the Toledo Symphony. Although only an abridged score was permitted outside Russia at that time, more and more of the score would be released over time, and Toledo Ballet continued to grow its production, so that, to this day, the company holds the record for the longest consecutively running production of this famous work in the nation. In 1958 citizens interested in supporting Toledo Ballet's mission founded the Toledo Ballet Association, which, in 1963, was incorporated as a non-profit organization.

After a 55-year career as artistic director, Vogt stepped down in 1995. Nigel Burgoine then held the post until 2005. Under him, Toledo Ballet and the Valentine Theatre co-presented international dance companies. Starting in 1998, Open Door to Dance was presented in Northwest Ohio schools. In 1999, First Steps, a dance education program for kindergarteners linking dance and literature, was presented in area Title-I-funded schools. In 2007 Toledo Ballet moved to expanded studio space at Franklin Park Mall, and alumna Lisa Mayer-Lang was appointed school director. During this time the company premiered nine original productions. In 2014 Lang became artistic director, serving until 2022, when dancer, educator and choreographer Eric Otto was appointed artistic director and head of curriculum.

== Background to TAPA ==
After decades-long collaboration, notably on the Nutcracker, the symphony orchestra and ballet company realized more synergies in 2017, in marketing and ticketing. On January 1, 2019, they merged to form the Toledo Alliance for the Performing Arts (TAPA), a non-profit organization dedicated to providing live music and dance performances, as well as education, for the region. The new entity is one of only a few in the nation. and it promises to integrate the arts through shared missions.
