= Andrew Massey (conductor) =

English conductor and composer (1946–2018)

Andrew Massey (1 May 1946 – 1 June 2018) was an English conductor and composer who was primarily active in the United States.

From 1991–2002 he was principal conductor of the Toledo Symphony Orchestra. He had previously held the post of principal conductor with the Fresno Philharmonic, the New Orleans Philharmonic-Symphony Orchestra and the Rhode Island Philharmonic Orchestra. He later served as conductor for the Middlebury College orchestra and an interim conductor for the Vermont Youth Orchestra.

He died in his home in Vermont on 1 June 2018, age 72, after a long battle with cancer.
