= Eleanor Cory =

American composer (born 1943)

Eleanor Cory (born 1943) is an American composer.

== Biography ==
Eleanor Cory was born in 1943. She graduated from Sarah Lawrence College with a Bachelor of Arts, Harvard Graduate School of Education with a Master of Arts in Teaching, the New England Conservatory with a Master of Music and Columbia University with a Doctor of Musical Arts.

Cory has taught at Yale University, Baruch College, Manhattan School of Music, Sarah Lawrence College, Brooklyn College, and The New School for Social Research. She currently teaches at Mannes College of Music Prep Division and Kingsborough Community College, CUNY.
