= Tashi Quartet =

American chamber music ensemble

The Tashi Quartet (originally known as TASHI) is an ensemble of violinist Ida Kavafian, pianist Peter Serkin, cellist Fred Sherry and, later, clarinetist Richard Stoltzman, founded in 1973 for the purpose of playing Quartet for the End of Time by Olivier Messiaen, as well as commissioning new works. The ensemble made several recordings for the RCA Red Seal label. After some 30 years of inactivity, in 2008 Tashi reunited for a tour to celebrate the centenary of Messiaen's birth.

Peter Serkin was fascinated by the concept of ‘sound color,’ created by composer Olivier Messiaen. Its history was Messiaen’s experience in a prisoner of war camp. There he composed Quartet for the End of Time. It was based on the color of visions Messiaen had while suffering internment, and it was written for the only musicians at the camp. Their instruments: cello, clarinet, piano and violin. Serkin was compelled to form a group with those same instruments that would take Messiaen’s masterpiece forward in time.

Once formed, the new quartet needed a name, and the name of Serkin’s Tibetan Terrier Tashi seemed perfect. Serkin purchased Tashi as a puppy from a Tibetan weaver while in Kathmandu. A Buddhist Lama, responsible for naming children and pets, named Tashi the dog for the Tibetan symbol of good fortune. Thus, the debut record album by the Tashi Quartet has a brightly colored Tibetan painting of this symbol as its cover.

One record cover was painted by Wendy Serkin together with Tibetan master thangka painters Noedrup and Rinzen Rongae.
