= William Anderson (guitarist) =

American guitarist and songwriter

- Born: 1962 (age 63–64); United States
- Occupations: Guitarist, composer
- Instrument: Guitar
- Years active: 1981–present
- Website: www.williamanderson.us

William Anderson (born 1962) is an American guitarist and songwriter.

Anderson studied the guitar with Allen Krantz, Christoph Harlan, and David Starobin, and studied composition with Frank Brickle. His recent recordings include music by Hans Erich Apostel, Milton Babbitt, Paul Hindemith, Ernst Krenek, Meyer Kupferman, and Robert Martin, as well as his own works.

Anderson's compositions include Guitar Variations (1993) for solo guitar, Ear Conception for chamber ensemble (1995), A Giddy Thing for mandolin (2001) and a number of shorter works.

Anderson is co-director of the Cygnus Ensemble (founded 1985), which released its first CD, Broken Consort, in 2001. He teaches the guitar at Sarah Lawrence College. He is also currently the director of the guitar ensemble at Queens College, part of the City University of New York.
