= Fred Sherry =

American cellist

Fred Sherry (born 1948) is an American cellist who is particularly admired for his work as a chamber musician and concert soloist. He studied with Leonard Rose at the Juilliard School before winning the Young Concert Artists International Auditions in 1968.

In 1971 he co-founded the Speculum Musicae and in 1973 he co-founded the Tashi Quartet.

Since the mid-1980s he has been a regular performer with Bargemusic and the Chamber Music Society of Lincoln Center, also serving as artistic director of the latter between 1989 and 1993.

He has appeared as a soloist with the Los Angeles Philharmonic, New Japan Philharmonic, Boston Symphony Orchestra, and L'Orchestre de la Suisse Romande.

Sherry currently serves on the faculty at the Juilliard School, the Manhattan School of Music, and Mannes College The New School for Music.

== Discography ==
With Chick Corea

- The Leprechaun (Polydor, 1976)
- Lyric Suite for Sextet (ECM, 1982) with Gary Burton
- Children's Songs (ECM, 1983)
- Septet (ECM, 1984)

With Steve Swallow

- Carla (Xtra Watt, 1987)

With John Zorn

- Chimeras (Tzadik, 2003)
- Rituals (Tzadik, 2004)
- Magick (Tzadik, 2004)
- Mysterium (Tzadik, 2005)
- From Silence to Sorcery (Tzadik, 2007)
- What Thou Wilt (Tzadik, 2009)
- Music and Its Double (Tzadik, 2012)
- Fragmentations, Prayers and Interjections (Tzadik, 2014)

With Tashi Quartet

- Quartet for the End of Time by Olivier Messiaen (RCA Victor, 1975)

For comprehensive discography, see official website.
