= Mario Davidovsky =

Argentine-American composer (1934–2019)

- Born: March 4, 1934; Médanos, Buenos Aires Province, Argentina
- Died: August 23, 2019 (aged 85); New York City, US
- Occupation: Composer
- Notable work: Synchronisms
- Awards: Pulitzer Prize for Music (1971); Joseph H. Bearns Prize

Mario Davidovsky (March 4, 1934 – August 23, 2019) was an Argentine-American composer. Born in Argentina, he emigrated in 1960 to the United States, where he lived for the remainder of his life. He is best known for his series of Synchronisms, which incorporate acoustic instruments and pre-recorded electronic sounds played from a tape.

== Biography ==
Davidovsky was born in Médanos, Buenos Aires Province, Argentina, on March 4, 1934, to Lithuanian Jewish immigrant parents. Aged seven, he began his musical studies on the violin. At thirteen he began composing. He studied composition and theory under Guillermo Graetzer at the University of Buenos Aires.

In 1958, he studied with Aaron Copland and Milton Babbitt at Tanglewood in Massachusetts. Through Babbitt, who worked at the Columbia-Princeton Electronic Music Center, and others, Davidovsky developed an interest in electroacoustic music. Copland encouraged Davidovsky to emigrate to the United States, and in 1960, Davidovsky settled in New York City, where he was appointed associate director of the Columbia-Princeton Electronic Music Center. It was at that time he began to compose the Synchronisms series of electroacoustic works. Synchronisms No. 6 for piano and tape won the 1971 Pulitzer Prize for Music.

Most of his published compositions since the 1970s were non-electronic. His only published electroacoustic compositions for much of that time were Synchronisms No. 9 (1988) and Synchronisms No. 10 (1992). However, Davidovsky received a commission by a group led by the Society for Electro-Acoustic Music in the United States (SEAMUS) to compose two more Synchronisms, and No. 11 and No. 12 premiered in 2007 at the SEAMUS National Conference in Ames, Iowa.

Davidovsky's association with the Columbia-Princeton Electronic Music Center continued, and from 1981 to 1993 he was the lab's director as well as professor of music at Columbia. In 1994, he became professor of music at Harvard University. Davidovsky also taught at many other institutions: University of Michigan (1964), the Di Tella Institute of Buenos Aires (1965), the Manhattan School of Music (1968–69), Yale University (1969–70), and the City College of New York (1968–80). He also served on the composition faculty of the Mannes School of Music.

In 1982, Davidovsky was elected a member of the American Academy of Arts and Letters.

== Personal life ==
Davidovsky married Elaine Blaustein in 1962; she died in 2017. They had two children and three grandchildren. He died in New York City on August 23, 2019, at the age of 85.

== Awards ==
- The American Academy of Arts and Letters' Academy Award (1965)
- Pulitzer Prize for Music (1971)
- Brandeis University Creative Arts Award
- Aaron Copland-Tanglewood Award
- SEAMUS Lifetime Achievement Award (1989)
- Naumburg Award
- Peggy Guggenheim Award (1982)
- Barlow Endowment for Music Composition – Commission (2003)
- Joseph H. Bearns Prize

== Fellowships ==
- Koussevitzky Foundation fellowship (1958)
- Rockefeller Foundation fellowship (1963, 1964)
- Guggenheim Fellowship (1960, 1971)
- Williams Foundation Fellowship
- Walter Channing Cabot Fellowship

== Works ==
- String Quartet No. 1 (1951)
- Concertino for Percussion and String Orchestra (1954)
- Quintet for Clarinet and Strings (1955)
- Suite Sinfonica Para "El Payaso" (1955), orchestra
- Three Pieces for Woodwind Quartet (1956)
- Noneti for Nine Instruments (1956)
- String Quartet No. 2 (1958)
- Serie Sinfonica 1959 (1959), orchestra
- Contrastes No. 1 (1960), string orchestra and electronic sounds
- Electronic Study No. 1 (1961) Columbia-Princeton Electronic Music Center
- Piano 1961 (1961), orchestra
- Electronic Study No. 2 (1962)
- Synchronisms No. 1 (1962), flute and electronic sound
- Trio for Clarinet, Trumpet, and Viola (1962)
- Synchronisms No. 2 (1964), flute, clarinet, violin, cello and tape
- Synchronisms No. 3 (1964), cello and electronic sound
- Electronic Study No. 3 (1965)
- Inflexions (1965), chamber ensemble
- Junctures (1966), flute, clarinet, and violin
- Synchronisms No. 4 (1966), chorus and tape
- Music for Solo Violin (1968)
- Synchronisms No. 5 (1969), percussion players and tape
- Synchronisms No. 6 (1970), piano and electronic sound (won 1971 Pulitzer Prize)
- Chacona (1971), violin, cello, and piano
- Transientes (1972), orchestra
- Ludus 2 (1973), flute, clarinet, violin, cello, piano
- Synchronisms No. 7 (1974), orchestra and tape
- Synchronisms No. 8 (1974), woodwind quintet and tape
- Scenes from Shir ha-Shirim (1975), soprano, two tenors, bass soli and chamber ensemble
- String Quartet No. 3 (1976)
- Pennplay (1979), sixteen players
- Consorts (1980), symphonic band
- String Quartet No. 4 (1980)
- String Trio (1982), violin, viola, violoncello
- Romancero (1983), soprano, flute (piccolo, alto flute), clarinet (bass clarinet), violin and violoncello
- Divertimento (1984), cello and orchestra
- Capriccio (1985), two pianos
- Salvos (1986), flute (piccolo, alto flute), clarinet, harp, percussion, violin and cello
- Quartetto (1987), flute, violin, viola and violoncello
- Synchronisms No. 9 (1988), violin and tape
- Biblical Songs (1990), soprano, flute, clarinet, violin, cello, and piano
- Concertante (1990), string quartet and orchestra
- Simple Dances (1991–2001), flute (piccolo, alto flute), two percussion, piano, and cello
- Synchronisms No. 10 (1992), guitar and electronic sounds
- Shulamit's Dream (1993), soprano and orchestra
- Festino (1994), guitar, viola, violoncello, contrabass
- Concertino (1995), violin and chamber orchestra
- Flashbacks (1995), flute (piccolo and alto flute), clarinet (bass clarinet), violin violoncello, piano and percussion
- Quartetto No. 2 (1996), oboe, violin, viola, violoncello
- String Quartet No. 5 (1998)
- Quartetto No. 3 (2000), piano, violin, viola, and violoncello
- Cantione Sine Textu (2001), soprano and chamber ensemble
- RecitAndy (2001), cello
- Duo Capriccioso (2003), piano and violin
- Sefarad: Four Spanish-Ladino Folkscenes (2004), baritone voice, flute (piccolo, alto flute), clarinet (bass clarinet), percussion, violin and cello
- Quartetto No. 4 (2005), clarinet, violin, viola and cello
- Synchronisms No. 11 (2005), contrabass and tape
- Synchronisms No. 12 (2006), clarinet and tape
- Piano Septet (2007)
- Divertimento for 8 ‘Ambiguous Symmetries’ (2015), flute, clarinet, percussion, violin, viola, cello, bass, piano
- String Quartet No. 6 ("Fragments")(2016)

== Discography ==
- Works by Martin Brody, Mario Davidovsky, Miriam Gideon, Rand Steiger, Chinary Ung, New World Records, New World 80412–2. Release date: December 8, 1992.
  - Synchronisms No. 6; Fred Bronstein, Piano.
- Korf: Symphony No.2/Davidovsky: Divertimento/Wright: Night Scenes, New World Records, New World 80383–2. Release date: December 8, 1992.
  - Divertimento; Fred Sherry, cello; Riverside Symphony, George Rothman conducting.
- Flashbacks: Music by Mario Davidovsky, Bridge Records, Bridge 9097. Release date: June 27, 2000.
  - Flashbacks; The New York New Music Ensemble.
  - Festino; Speculum Musicae.
  - Romancero; Susan Narucki, soprano; Speculum Musicae.
  - Quartetto No. 2; Peggy Pearson, oboe; Bayla Keyes, violin; Mary Ruth Ray, viola; Rhonda Rider, violoncello.
  - Synchronisms No. 10; David Starobin, guitar.
  - String Trio; Speculum Musicae.
- Mario Davidovsky: 3 Cycles on Biblical Texts; Susan Narucki, soprano; Riverside Symphony, George Rothman conducting; Bridge Records, Bridge 1112. Release Date: July 30, 2002.
  - Shulamit's Dream.
  - Scenes from Shir ha-Shirim.
  - Biblical Songs.
- Harvard Composers, Mendelssohn String Quartet, BIS Records, BIS-SACD-1264. Release date: September 9, 2003.
  - String Quartet No. 5.
- Salvos: Chamber Music of Mario Davidovsky, Empyrean Ensemble; Susan Narucki, soprano. Arabesque Records, Arabesque Z6777. Release date: January 6, 2004.
  - Simple Dances.
  - Cantione Sine Textu.
  - Quartetto.
  - Salvos.
  - String Trio.
- The Music of Mario Davidovsky, Vol. 3, Bridge Records, Bridge 9171. Release date: September 1, 2005.
  - Synchronisms No. 5; The Manhattan School of Music Percussion Ensemble, Jeffrey Milarsky, conductor.
  - Synchronisms No. 6 Aleck Karis, piano.
  - Synchronisms No. 9; Curtis Macomber, violin.
  - Chacona; Curtis Macomber, violin; Eric Bartlett, cello; Aleck Karis, piano.
  - Quartetto; Susan Palma Nidel, flute; Curtis Macomber, violin; Maureen Gallagher, viola; Eric Bartlett, violoncello.
  - Duo Capriccioso; Curtis Macomber, violin; Aleck Karis, piano.
