= Speculum Musicae =

Speculum Musicae is an American chamber ensemble dedicated to the performance of contemporary classical music. It was founded in New York City in 1971 and is particularly noted for its performances of the music of Elliott Carter and Charles Wuorinen. Oboist Joel Marangella and cellist Fred Sherry were two of the group's founding members, and Robert Black was also a long-time member.

The group is made up of twelve New York-based musicians. Its repertoire includes 25 commissioned works, 52 world premieres, and 32 U.S. premieres.

Speculum Musicae has been in residence at Brandeis University, Columbia University, Harvard University, and Rice University, and has recorded for the Albany, Bridge, Cambria, Centaur, Columbia, Composers Recordings, Inc., New World, and Nonesuch labels. It received the Laurel Leaf Award from the American Composers Alliance in 1997.

The ensemble was nominated for Best Chamber Music Performance at the 46th Annual Grammy Awards.
