= Symphony No. 2 (Albert) =

The Symphony No. 2 is a three-movement symphony for orchestra by the American composer Stephen Albert. The work was commissioned by the New York Philharmonic for their sesquicentennial anniversary. However, the piece had to be completed posthumously by the composer Sebastian Currier after Albert died suddenly in a car crash on December 27, 1992. The first performance took place November 10, 1994, with the New York Philharmonic conducted by Hugh Wolff. Albert's previous Symphony No. 1 RiverRun had won the Pulitzer Prize for Music in 1985.

== Composition ==
=== Structure ===
The symphony has a duration of approximately thirty minutes and is composed in three movements:

1. Allegro
2. Adagio
3. Allegro

=== Currier's contribution ===
Fellow composer and music critic Steve Schwartz wrote about the work:

[Albert] wrote to his publisher, G. Schirmer, that he all he (sic) had to do was orchestrate. In reality, he did what a lot of composers do: write the piece in a combination of real notes and reminders to himself. According to the man who took on the job of completion, Sebastian Currier, all—or nearly all—the measures were there, but the measures themselves may not have been complete. He had to make plenty of decisions, the most important of them about the nature of the ending, which runs counter to Albert's normal practice of fading away. The composer, notably close-lipped about his work while he was writing, happened to mention to his wife that the ending this time would be full. Suddenly, the wisps of themes at the end of the manuscript transformed from their literal sense to a solid orchestral build.

== Reception ==
In reviewing the work, Schwartz compared the piece favorably to Albert's Symphony No. 1, saying, "Albert resorts to ostinatos less and concentrates on counterpoint more." Schwartz added, "The symphony runs tighter than its sibling, with an increase of power, as well as clearer, with a corresponding jump in tension."
