= Concerto for String Quartet and Orchestra =

Concerto for String Quartet and Orchestra may refer to:

- Concerto for String Quartet and Chamber Orchestra (Hosseini)
- Concerto for String Quartet and Orchestra (Schoenberg)
- Concerto for String Quartet and Wind Orchestra (Schulhoff)
- Concerto for String Quartet and Orchestra (Schuller)
