= Concerto Fantastique =

Orchestra composition by Ralph Shapey

Concerto Fantastique is an orchestral composition in four movements by the American composer Ralph Shapey. The work was commissioned by the Chicago Symphony Orchestra, who first performed the work under the composer on November 21, 1991. It was a finalist for the 1992 Pulitzer Prize for Music.

== Composition ==
Concerto Fantastique has a duration of roughly one hour and is composed in four movements:

1. Variations
2. Elegy
3. Intermezzo
4. Rondo

The first movement, "Variations", is dedicated to the University of Chicago, at which Shapey was on faculty from the mid-1960s until his retirement in 1991. The second movement, "Elegy", is dedicated to the late Chicago-based philanthropist Paul Fromm. The last two movements, "Intermezzo" and "Rondo", are both dedicated to the Chicago Symphony Orchestra.

Shapey described the composition process, remarking, "I started out to write a concerto, but as I was writing the piece it became more and more obvious that this was not just a concerto. That is how Fantastique came to be added to the title. I wrote the piece for a virtuoso orchestra and virtuoso players. The second, third and fourth movements come directly out of the first. Each movement is complete within itself, but you can also regard the entire work as a great big sonata-allegro form."

== Reception ==
=== World premiere ===
Concerto Fantastique received a mixed response from the audience at its world premiere. Wynne Delacoma of the Chicago Sun-Times observed, "The hall was full at the start of the evening, probably because Alfred Brendel was opening the program with Liszt's Piano Concerto No. 2. A portion of the audience didn't return from intermission to hear Shapey conduct his own work, and more left in the pauses between the four movements." The music critic John von Rhein of the Chicago Tribune similarly wrote, "There was a noticeable exodus of audience members between movements of Shapey's hourlong work and scattered boos at the end." Despite this, Rhein added, "But the applause was considerable, and Chicago's most eminent composer, back in front of the CSO after 22 years, clearly savored the moment."

=== Critical response ===
The piece has received a very positive reception from music critics. Reviewing the world premiere, John von Rhein wrote, "Concerto fantastique is [Shapey's] biggest work to date, and while I don't think it's his most successful—I much prefer the Shapey of the pungent, concise pieces he has written for his Contemporary Chamber Players—I would not deny the work's sinewy expressiveness or its stubborn refusal to sound like anybody else but Shapey." He added:

Shapey's sternly sculpted abstract expressionism stands at a far remove from what most of today's younger composers are doing. It is tough, aggressive, loud, uncompromising in its demands on players and listeners. Yet underneath the concerto's typically knotted textures and ferocious harmonies beats the heart of a fervent romantic. Shapey is about the only ecstatic visionary still working in serious music; he's a modern-day Icarus who thinks nothing of flying perilously close to the sun every chance he gets.

== Pulitzer dispute ==
The jury for the 1992 Pulitzer Prize for Music, comprising George Perle, Roger Reynolds, and Harvey Sollberger, unanimously chose to submit only Concerto Fantastique for award consideration, despite Pulitzer rules requiring the jury to submit three works for board consideration. The jury wrote, "Long the creator of original and visionary works in a wide range of musical media, Mr. Shapey has in this work achieved a striking summation that integrates the craggy and uncompromising materials of a very personal language on a grand scale."

When the Pulitzer board demanded an alternative, threatening to forego a music prize for the year, the jury submitted Wayne Peterson's The Face of the Night, the Heart of the Dark. In an upset to the jury, the board selected The Face of the Night, the Heart of the Dark over Concerto Fantastique as the winner.

George Perle commented on the incident, remarking, "I don't want to belittle the Peterson work, which is marvelous. It is absolutely worthy of a Pulitzer Prize. But the Pulitzer Prize is supposed to be for the single best work of the year, and on this occasion we felt that there was a work that was more impressive. We were entirely unanimous on that point, and we did not expect to be overruled."
