= Concerto for Cello, Piano, and String Orchestra =

1989 composition by Ralph Shapey

The Concerto for Cello, Piano, and String Orchestra is a composition for solo cello, piano, and a large string orchestra by the American composer Ralph Shapey. The work was composed for the cellist Joel Krosnick and the pianist Gilbert Kalish and was first performed at Tanglewood in 1989. It was first performed by Krosnick, Kalish, and the Berkshire Music Chamber Orchestra under the composer on July 31, 1989. The piece was a finalist for the 1990 Pulitzer Prize for Music and shared the top Kennedy Center Friedheim Award prize with William Kraft for Veils and Variations for Horn and Orchestra.

== Composition ==
The concerto has a duration of roughly minutes and is composed in three movements:

1. Prologue
2. Psalm
3. Rondo

== Reception ==
Anthony Tommasini of The New York Times called it a "visionary work" and wrote, "The score calls, crazily, for an orchestra of 48 strings. The concerto begins with an inexorable Prologue, which is followed by a subdued Psalm, almost Hebraic in its mysterious solemnity, and a fractured and exuberant Rondo." Lesley Valdes of The Philadelphia Inquirer was more critical of the work, however, remarking, "In the Concerto for Cello, Piano and Strings, Shapey has crafted a dense, lurching, argumentative piece whose motives mysteriously soften in its slow movement to form a psalm of some beauty—although its beauty seems self-conscious because atmospherically it emphatically suggests the woodland scene from Ravel's L'enfant et les sortilèges."
