= Wayne Peterson =

American composer (1927–2021)

- Born: September 3, 1927; Albert Lea, Minnesota, U.S.
- Died: April 7, 2021 (aged 93); San Francisco, California, U.S.
- Occupations: Composer, music professor
- Spouse: Harriet Christensen (divorced)
- Partner: Ruth Knier (1979–2021, her death)
- Awards: Pulitzer Prize for Music, 1992

Wayne Peterson (September 3, 1927 – April 7, 2021) was an American composer, pianist, and educator. He won the Pulitzer Prize for Music for The Face of the Night, the Heart of the Dark in 1992, when its board overturned the jury's unanimous selection of Concerto Fantastique by Ralph Shapey.

== Early life ==
Peterson was born in Albert Lea, Minnesota, on September 3, 1927. He spoke of the musical heritage of his parents "My father, a victim of the Depression, bounced around from one thing to another. He wasn’t musical. My mother’s side of the family was." He developed a passion for reading at the age of seven, when he was confined to bed for several months due to scarlet fever. He learned the piano during his childhood. He was particularly drawn to jazz, and became a professional jazz musician when he was 15 years old.

Peterson obtained a Bachelor of Arts, Master of Arts, and Doctor of Philosophy at the University of Minnesota. He undertook advanced study on a Fulbright Scholarship at the Royal Academy of Music in London from 1953 to 1954. There, he collaborated with Lennox Berkeley and Howard Ferguson. His composition, Free Variations, was recorded by Antal Doráti and the Minnesota Orchestra in 1959, a year before he was awarded his doctorate. It was his first work to be recorded.

== Career ==
Peterson joined the faculty of San Francisco State University in 1960, ultimately reaching the rank of Professor of Music, before retiring in 1991. He became guest professor of composition at Stanford University one year later, serving in that capacity until 1994. Peterson was awarded the 1992 Pulitzer Prize for Music for The Face of the Night, the Heart of the Dark, an orchestral work commissioned by the San Francisco Symphony and conducted by David Zinman. The Pulitzer board controversially overturned the unanimous selection of the jury – consisting of George Perle, Roger Reynolds, and Harvey Sollberger – who chose Concerto Fantastique by Ralph Shapey. This was reportedly the first time the board opted not to accept the jury's decision. Peterson had the following comments about the prize years later:

Winning the Pulitzer has meant nothing for the piece that won. Back when Blomstedt was at the San Francisco Symphony, David Zinman conducted it and did a beautiful job. But they never did it again and nobody else has ever played it. It's a very difficult piece. I write chromatic music and chromatic music is not in vogue at the moment. I think that has not helped things. The Prize has benefited me in other ways, however. You get a lot of notoriety out of it. My commissions have soared and everything I have written since that time has been published. And I am fortunate enough to have some of the best musicians in the world playing my chamber music, which has led to a CD that has just come out.

Peterson admitted that he would have voted for Shapey's work had he been on the jury. He nonetheless accepted the prize. His other honors include a Composer's Award from the American Academy and Institute of Arts and Letters (1986) and a Guggenheim Fellowship (1989–90). He was a visiting artist at the American Academy in Rome in 1990. Eight years later, San Francisco State University established the Wayne Peterson Prize in Music Composition, which he administered in joint sponsorship with the institution. It was awarded for four years until 2002.

== Personal life ==
Peterson's first marriage was to Harriet Christensen; they ultimately divorced. Together, they had four children: Alan, Drew, Craig, and Grant. He was in a domestic partnership with Ruth Knier for 42 years until her death in 2021, seven weeks before his own.

Peterson died on April 7, 2021, at his home in San Francisco, aged 93.

== Compositions ==
- Brief Encounters (2014)
- Bright Reflections (2013)
- Excursion violin and piano (2010)
- Full Circle brass quintet plus percussion: 1 player (2009)
- Trap Drum Fantasy for solo drum set (2008)
- Scherzo for flute, clarinet, violin, cello (2008)
- String Trio (2007)
- She Lives with the Furies of Hope and Despair and I am Cherry Alive (2006)
- Pas de Deux flute/alto flute & marimba/vibraphone (2006)
- Three Pieces for Orchestra (2005)
- Freedom and Love (2004)
- Fanfare (2004)
- A Three Piece Suite (2003)
- Quest flute/alto flute and piano (2002)
- Tympan Alley (2002)
- Transcriptions of Piano Music: Chopin, Bartok, Ravel (2002)
- A Debussy Suite (2002)
- Nonet (2001)
- A Brahms Suite, three transcriptions of piano music (2001)
- Four Preludes for piano (2000)
- Inscape (2000)
- Carol (2000)
- Antiphonies for solo percussion: marimba/vibraphone (1999)
- Colloquy flute and harp (1999)
- Seven Debussy Songs seven Debussy songs transcribed for soprano or mezzo-soprano and small orchestra (1999)
- Monarch of the Vine percussion quartet (1998)
- Pop Sweet (String Quartet No. 3) (1998)
- Monarch of the Vine (1998)
- Peregrinations solo clarinet (1997)
- Windup saxophone quartet (1997)
- A Robert Herrick Motley five a cappella choruses, SATB, settings of Robert Herrick (poet) (1996, rev. 2000)
- Theseus for chamber orchestra (1995–96)
- Vicissitudes for six players (1995)
- And the Winds Shall Blow a fantasy for saxophone quartet, winds and percussion (1994)
- Duo for Violin and Piano (1993)
- Janus for Ten Instruments (1993)
- Diptych: Aubade, Odyssey for six players (1992)
- String Quartet No. 2: Apparitions, Jazz Play (1991)
- Four Spanish Songs (of Manuel de Falla) transcribed for woodwind quintet (1991)
- The Face of the Night, the Heart of the Dark for orchestra (1991) awarded the 1992 Pulitzer Prize in Music
- Four Spanish Songs (of Manuel de Falla) (1991)
- String Quartet No. 2: Apparitions, Jazz Play (1991)
- Mallets Aforethought for percussion quartet (1990)
- The Widening Gyre for orchestra (1990)
- Sonatine of Maurice Ravel transcribed for woodwind quintet (1989)
- Debussy String Quartet, 1st Movement (1989)
- Duodecaphony for viola (or violin) and cello (1988)
- Trilogy for chamber orchestra (1988)
- Labyrinth flute, clarinet, violin and piano (1987)
- Transformations for chamber orchestra (1986)
- Ariadne's Thread for harp and six players (1985) winner of the American Society of Harpists 1985 composition contest
- String Quartet No. 1 (1983)
- Sextet (1982)
- Doubles for 2 flutes, clarinet and bass clarinet (1982)
- Dark Reflections (1980)
- An Interrupted Serenade flute, harp and cello (1978)
- Rhapsody for Cello and Piano (1976)
- Encounters for eight players (1976)
- Diatribe violin and piano (1975)
- Capriccio flute and piano (1973)
- Spring (1970)
- Ceremony After a Fire Raid (1969, rev. 2001)
- Phantasmagoria for three players (1969)
- Clusters and Fragments (1968)
- Metamorphoses for wind quintet (1967)
- an ee cummings cantata chorus SATB/piano or SATB/ mixed ensemble of 8 players (1964)
- an ee cummings triptych (1962)
- Exaltation, Dithyramb and Caprice (1961)
- Psalm 56 (1959)
- Free Variations for orchestra (1958) premiered and recorded by Antal Doráti and the Minnesota Orchestra
- Three Songs (1957)
- Earth, Sweet Earth (1956)
- Can Death Be Sleep setting of John Keats for a cappella chorus, SATB (1955)
