= Sebastian Currier =

American composer

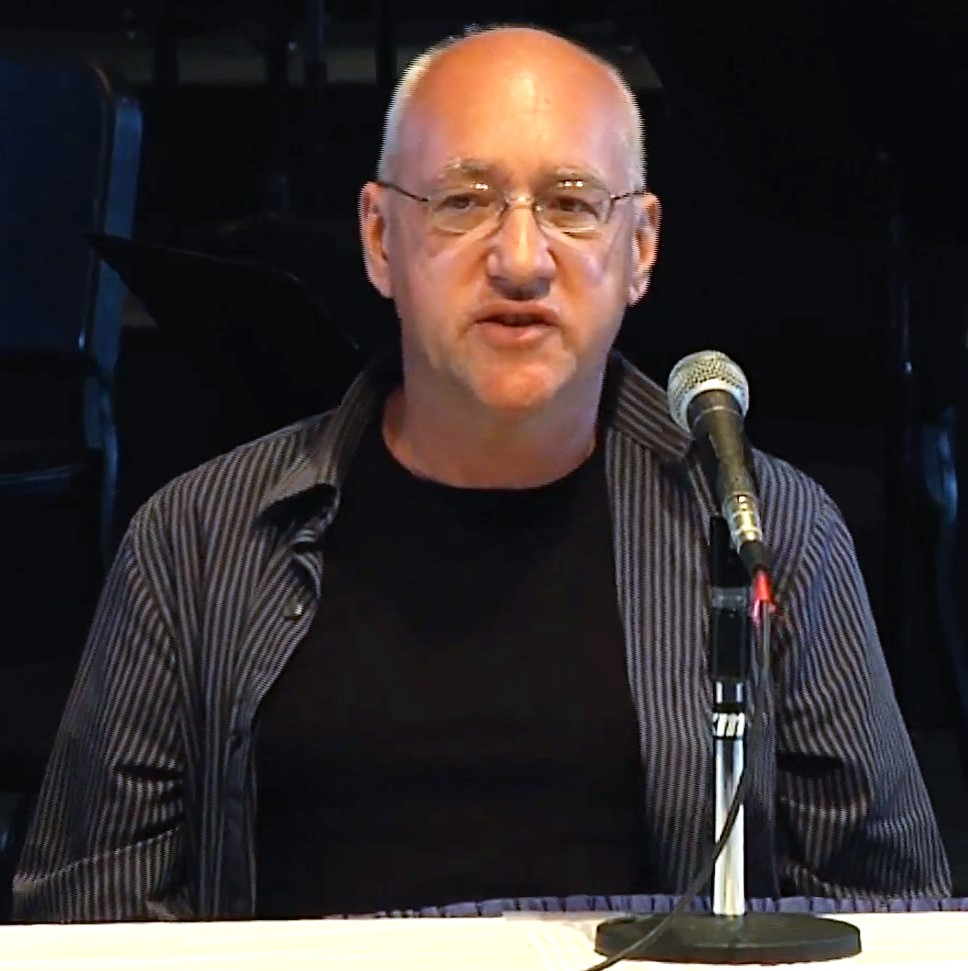
- Currier at the 2015 Cabrillo Festival of Contemporary Music

Sebastian Currier (born March 16, 1959) is an American composer of music for chamber groups and orchestras. He was also a professor of music at Columbia University from 1999 to 2007.

== Life ==
Currier was born in Huntingdon, Pennsylvania, and was raised in Providence, Rhode Island, in a family of talented musicians, including his brother Nathan Currier, also a noted composer. Sebastian Currier received degrees from the Juilliard School and Manhattan School of Music. His compositions include Crossfade, written for two harps, and Microsymph, described as a "30-minute symphony compressed into 10 minutes."

In October 2005, members of the Berlin Philharmonic performed an entire evening of his works, including the premiere of Remix.

Currier completed the orchestration of Stephen Albert's Symphony No. 2, part of which was unfinished at the time of Albert's death. It was subsequently recorded on Naxos Records along with Albert's Symphony No. 1 Riverrun, which won a Pulitzer Prize.

Violinist Anne-Sophie Mutter has recorded Currier's Aftersong, which the composer dedicated to her. On June 2, 2011, she also premiered his Time Machines (composed in 2007 and reworked by the composer in 2011) with the Slovak Roman Patkoló playing the contrabasso and the New York Philharmonic Orchestra, conducted by Alan Gilbert. His Piano Concerto was premiered in April 2007 by Emma Tahmizian.

Currier has received a Grawemeyer Award for Music Composition, for Static, and a 2010 Distinguished Alumni Award from the Manhattan School of Music.

On March 12, 2013, the Institute for Advanced Study at Princeton announced the appointment of Currier as Artist-in-Residence, his term to begin on July 1, 2013.

== Awards ==
- 2007 University of Louisville Grawemeyer Award for Music Composition for Static for flute, clarinet, violin, 'cello, and piano. Static is the second Grawemeyer Award-winning piece that does not require a conductor (the other is György Ligeti's Piano Etudes, which won the award in 1986).
- 1992 Guggenheim Fellowship
- 1994 Rome Prize
