= Joel Krosnick =

American cellist (1941–2025)

Joel Krosnick (3 April 1941 – 15 April 2025) was an American cellist who performed as a soloist, recitalist, and chamber musician throughout the world for over 40 years. As a member of the Juilliard String Quartet from 1974 to 2016, he performed the great quartet literature throughout North America, Europe, Asia, and Australia.

== Life and career ==
Krosnick was born in 1941 in New Haven, Connecticut, to a family of enthusiastic amateur musicians—his mother was a pianist, his father a violinist/doctor. There was so much recorded and live chamber music in his home that by the time Joel was 12 years old, he had played most of the Classical and Romantic piano trio literature with his mother and (later professional) violinist brother, Aaron. By 17, he had read much of the standard quartet repertory with his family and friends.

Attending Columbia University, Krosnick became involved with composers and new music, eventually becoming a founding member of The Group for Contemporary Music. The connection with the music of his time became a lifelong passion for Krosnick and led to premieres and performances of works by such composers as Roger Sessions, Elliott Carter, Charles Wuorinen, Ralph Shapey, Richard Wernick, Stefan Wolpe, Perry Goldstein, Milton Babbitt, Paul Zonn, Donald Martino, Stanley Walden, and Morton Subotnick.

=== Cellist ===
Krosnick recorded the complete quartets of Beethoven, Bartók, Schoenberg, Janáček, Hindemith, and Brahms, as well as the last ten quartets of Mozart, four quartets by Carter, and works by Martino, Sessions, Debussy, Ravel, Dutilleux, Berg, Smetana, Franck, Verdi, Stefan Wolpe, Bach, and Haydn.

With his sonata partner of over 20 years, pianist Gilbert Kalish, Krosnick performed recitals throughout the United States and Europe. Starting in 1976, they gave an annual series of recitals at Weill and Merkin Halls and Miller and Juilliard theaters. In 1984, Krosnick and Kalish gave a six-concert retrospective of 20th-century music for cello and piano at the Juilliard theater and at the Library of Congress.

In 1982, Krosnick was a soloist with the Naumburg Orchestral Concerts, in the Naumburg Bandshell, Central Park.

With Kalish, Krosnick recorded for Arabesque Records Beethoven's complete sonatas and variations and Brahms's sonatas, as well as works by Carter, Poulenc, Prokofiev, Hindemith, Debussy, Janáček, and Henry Cowell. They also made a recording of Ralph Shapey's cello and piano music; soon to be released is a disc of Forgotten Americans, including music of Ernst Bacon, Hall Overton, Ben Weber, and Otto Luening.

In the 2002–03 season, Krosnick and Kalish performed a pair of recitals at Juilliard. One was a memorial to Shapey, involving among other works his Sonata for Cello and Piano (1954), Kroslish Sonata, Songs of Life, and the premiere of Duo Variations for Violin and Cello (1985). The other included premieres of works by Gunther Schuller and Richard Wernick, as well as works by Poulenc and Robert Stern.

Particularly noteworthy are premieres of Martino's Cello Concerto in Cincinnati and New York City (with the Juilliard Orchestra); also significant were the premieres of Shapey's Double Concerto for Violin, Cello, and Orchestra (with Robert Mann and the composer conducting the Juilliard Orchestra) and Shapey's Double Concerto for Cello, Piano, and Double String Orchestra (with Kalish and Shapey conducting the Tanglewood Music Center Orchestra). In 1999, Krosnick premiered Wernick's Cello Concerto No. 2 with the Juilliard Orchestra. In 2001, he performed Donald Francis Tovey's concerto with the Jupiter Symphony with Jens Nygaard conducting.

Krosnick recorded for the Sony Classical, Nonesuch, Orion, CRI, New World, Koch International, and Arabesque labels.

=== Academic ===
Krosnick taught cello and chamber music since his earliest professional life. He held professorships at the Universities of Iowa and Massachusetts, and had been artist-in-residence at the California Institute of the Arts. In 1974, he joined the faculty of the Juilliard School. In 1994, he became chair of the cello department. Krosnick was associated with the Aspen Festival, Marlboro, the Tanglewood Music Center, the Daniel Days Music Festival, Ravinia, Yellow Barn, and Kneisel Hall, of which he was an alumnus. In 1999, he joined for the second time the faculty of the Piatigorsky Seminar at the University of Southern California.

Krosnick held honorary doctoral degrees from Michigan State University, Jacksonville University, and the San Francisco Conservatory of Music. As a member of the Juilliard String Quartet, he received numerous Grammy nominations, twice winning the Grammy Award (for the complete Schoenberg Quartets, and for the late quartets of Beethoven). His discs In the Shadow of World War II and In the Shadow of World War I (both with Kalish) won Indie Awards in 1997 and 1999. His recording of the Brahms sonatas won the 2002 award from the Classical Recording Foundation.

=== Death ===
Krosnick died of pancreatic cancer at his home in Hastings-on-Hudson, New York, on 15 April 2025, at the age of 84.
