= The Face of the Night, the Heart of the Dark =

- by Wayne Peterson
- Commissioned by: San Francisco Symphony
- Performed: October 1991:
- Published: 1991: Henmar Press
- Duration: 19 minutes
- Movements: one

The Face of the Night, the Heart of the Dark is an orchestral composition in one movement by the American composer Wayne Peterson. The piece was first performed by the San Francisco Symphony under the conductor David Zinman in October 1991. It won the 1992 Pulitzer Prize for Music. The title is a quote from the works of Thomas Wolfe.

== Pulitzer dispute ==
The awarding of the Pulitzer Prize to The Face of the Night, the Heart of the Dark gained considerable notoriety in the classical music community. The music jury, comprising George Perle, Roger Reynolds, and Harvey Sollberger, originally submitted only one work for consideration—Ralph Shapey's Concerto Fantastique—despite Pulitzer rules requiring the jury to submit three works for board consideration. However, George Perle, who had served on previous Pulitzer Prize for Music juries, claimed that he was not aware of such provision. When the Pulitzer board demanded an alternative, threatening to forego a music prize for the year, the jury submitted Peterson's The Face of the Night, the Heart of the Dark. In an upset to the jury, the board selected The Face of the Night, the Heart of the Dark over Concerto Fantastique.

Perle commented on the incident, remarking, "I don't want to belittle the Peterson work, which is marvelous. It is absolutely worthy of a Pulitzer Prize. But the Pulitzer Prize is supposed to be for the single best work of the year, and on this occasion we felt that there was a work that was more impressive. We were entirely unanimous on that point, and we did not expect to be overruled." Reynolds and Sollberger released a similar statement, saying, "The Pulitzer Prize board's action in modifying the music jury's decision this year is especially alarming because it occurred without consultation and without knowledge of either our standards or rationale. Such alterations by a committee without professional musical expertise guarantees, if continued, a lamentable devaluation of this uniquely important award."

Walter Rugaber, then a member of the Pulitzer board, responded, "What all the juries are asked to do is to select three nominees and submit them to us without expressing a preference." He added:

I do not question the validity of Mr. Perle's argument that the jury is vastly more qualified, in a technical and professional sense, to judge a work of music than I am. But the other side of the argument is that the Pulitzers are enhanced by having, in addition to the professional's point of view, the layman's or consumer's point of view. These are works that are performed in concert halls, and which thousands of people hear. And I think it is not inappropriate for people who are not professional musicians, composers or performers to listen to the best that the professionals recommend, and to express an opinion that one is more interesting than the other. But there are a number of issues we have to discuss before next year, and this is first among them.

Peterson himself responded to the controversy, remarking:

I do have mixed feelings about the prize because of this. I have the highest regard for the integrity and musical judgment of the three people on the jury. I think they acted properly and if I had been on the committee I probably would have done the same. And I think that Ralph Shapey has made an outstanding contribution to American music. He has gone his own way, he has a distinctive style, and he has been a major force. So I'm sorry that this situation exists. But I am delighted to be a recipient. I had sent the work in as a lark, and I didn't think I had even a remote chance of winning. I have won other awards, but the prestige of the Pulitzer is greater than that of the others. The controversy has made it a little different. I just hope the pall that it has cast will not jeopardize what the Pulitzer could mean in helping circulate my music.

== Recording ==
Following its premiere by the San Francisco Symphony, the work was not performed again until 2010, when the Boston Modern Orchestra Project performed it, releasing it on a CD in 2017.
