= Chiavi in Mano =

Piano concerto

Chiavi in Mano is a piano concerto in one movement by the composer Yehudi Wyner. The work was commissioned by the Boston Symphony Orchestra and was first performed in February 2005 by the pianist Robert D. Levin and the Boston Symphony Orchestra under the conductor Robert Spano. The piece was later awarded Pulitzer Prize for Music in 2006.

== Composition ==
Chiavi in Mano has a duration of roughly 20 minutes and is composed in a single continuous movement. Wyner described the composition of the piece in the score program notes, writing:

Much of the concerto was composed during the summer of 2004 at the American Academy in Rome in a secluded studio hidden within the Academy walls. While much of the composing took place far from home, the concerto comes out as a particularly "American" piece, shot through with vernacular elements. As in many of my compositions, simple, familiar musical ideas are the starting point. A shape, a melodic fragment, a rhythm, a chord, a texture, or a sonority may ignite the appetite for exploration. How such simple insignificant things can be altered, elaborated, extended, and combined becomes the exciting challenge of composition. I also want the finished work to breathe in a natural way, to progress spontaneously, organically, moving toward a transformation of the musical substance in ways unimaginable to me when I began the journey. Transformation is the goal, with the intention of achieving an altered state of perception and exposure that I am otherwise unable to achieve.

=== Instrumentation ===
The work is scored for an orchestra comprising two flutes, piccolo, two oboes, two clarinets, two bassoons, four horns, two trumpets, three trombones, tuba, timpani, percussion, and strings.
