= Concerto for String Quartet and Orchestra (Schoenberg) =

Composition by Arnold Schoenberg

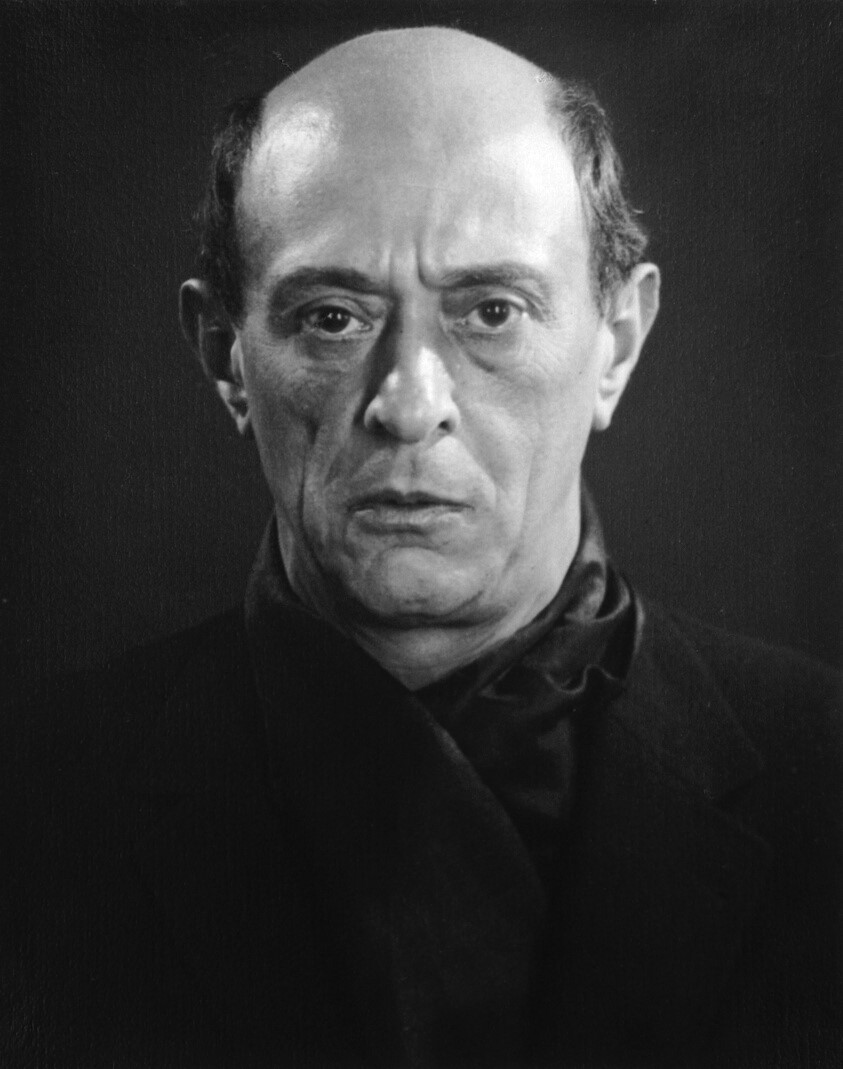
Arnold Schoenberg in 1927

The Concerto for String Quartet and Orchestra in B♭ is a work by the Austrian composer Arnold Schoenberg, freely composed after the Concerto Grosso Op. 6, No. 7 by George Frideric Handel.

The work is divided into four movements:

1. Largo – Allegro
2. Largo
3. Allegretto grazioso
4. Hornpipe

== Background ==
The Concerto was written in the summer of 1933. In May of that year Schoenberg had been forced to flee Berlin after the accession of the Nazi Party. He first went to Paris (where he reconverted from Lutheranism to the Judaism of his childhood). He spent the summer of 1933 with his wife and infant daughter in the French town of Arcachon, a seaside resort near Bordeaux, completing the Concerto there before leaving for permanent residence in America in October.

The work was first performed on September 26, 1934 in Prague with the Kolisch Quartet as soloists.

== Similar works ==
Other works for string quartet and orchestra have been written by John Adams, Morton Feldman, Mehdi Hosseini, Helmut Lachenmann, Benjamin Lees, Bohuslav Martinů, Emmanuel Nunes, Julián Orbón, Gunther Schuller, Louis Spohr, and Julia Wolfe, while concertos for string quartet and wind orchestra have been written by Walter Piston, Joel Puckett, and Erwin Schulhoff.

== Sources ==
- Program notes by Robert Craft for the recording (Naxos Records 8.557520) of Schoenberg's Concerto for String Quartet and Orchestra in B-flat major performed by the Fred Sherry Quartet with the Twentieth Century Classics Ensemble under the baton of Robert Craft.
- Center in Vienna devoted to Arnold Schoenberg
