= Vivian Fine =

American composer (1913–2000)

Background information
- Born: September 28, 1913; Chicago, Illinois
- Died: March 20, 2000 (aged 86) Bennington, Vermont, U.S.
- Genres: 20th-century classical
- Occupation: Composer

Vivian Fine (28 September 1913 – 20 March 2000) was an American composer.

== Life ==
Fine was born in Chicago to David and Rose Fine. A piano prodigy, she became at age five the youngest student ever to be awarded a scholarship at the Chicago Musical College. At age eleven she became a student of Scriabin disciple Djane Lavoie-Herz. Fine composed her first piece at thirteen while studying harmony with Ruth Crawford, who considered Fine her protégée. Through Madame Herz and Crawford, Fine met Henry Cowell, Imre Weisshaus, and Dane Rudhyar, who were supporters of her talent (Von Gunden 2001).

== Professional career ==
Fine made her professional debut as a composer at age sixteen with performances in Chicago, New York (Solo for Oboe, at a Pan-American Association of Composers' concert) and Dessau (Four Pieces for Two Flutes, at an International Society of Contemporary composers' concert). In 1931, the 18-year-old Fine moved to New York to further her studies. She was a member of Aaron Copland's Young Composers Group, and a participant at the first Yaddo Festival in 1932 (Von Gunden 2001). In 1937 she helped found the American Composers Alliance and served as its vice-president from 1961 to 1965. In addition to her career as a composer, Fine continued to perform. In the 1930s she was perhaps the best-known performer of contemporary piano music in New York. She premiered works of Charles Ives, Aaron Copland, Brant, Henry Cowell, Rudhyar, and others, and studied piano with Abby Whiteside from 1937 to 1945 (Von Gunden 2001).

== Compositional style and themes ==
Fine's early compositional style was highly dissonant and contrapuntal. In 1934 she began a nine-year course of composition studies with Roger Sessions, and her work became for a time more tonal, as exemplified by Suite in E Flat (1940) and Concertante for Piano and Orchestra (1944). In 1946, with Capriccio for Oboe and String Trio and The Great Wall of China, she returned to a freer mode of expression, to which she adhered for the remainder of her career, steadily expanding her expressive and generic range. She employed diverse techniques corresponding to a wide range of musical subjects. Henry Brant noted that "No two Fine pieces are alike either in subject matter or instrumentation; each new work appears to generate its own style appropriate to the subject, and there are no mannerisms which persist from work to work."

Notable in Fine's work is a sense of fun, either as a major element in the piece (The Race of Life, Memoirs of Uliana Rooney) or as a humorous section or reference inserted into a more serious piece (The Women in the Garden, Songs and Arias).

Fine wrote extensively for voice, employing the poetry of Shakespeare, Racine, Dryden, Keats, Whitman, Dickinson, Kafka, Neruda, and others in a wide variety of settings. She composed two chamber operas, The Women in the Garden (1978) and Memoirs of Uliana Rooney (1994). In The Women in the Garden, Fine used the writings of Emily Dickinson, Virginia Woolf, Isadora Duncan and Gertrude Stein to fashion conversations among the four women and a tenor representing the various men in their lives. Memoirs of Uliana Rooney (1994), Fine's last major composition, is a contemporary opera buffa, with libretto and videography by Sonya Friedman. The work, autobiographical in spirit if not in factual detail, follows American composer Uliana Rooney as she journeys through the 20th century, surviving changing political climates and several husbands to ultimately triumph.

== Awards, accolades, and legacy ==
Among Fine's many awards were a Guggenheim Fellowship, grants from the Ford, Rockefeller, Ditson, Woolley, Koussevitsky, Reader's Digest and Elizabeth Sprague Coolidge foundations, several grants from the National Endowment for the Arts, and the Dollard and Yaddo Awards. In 1980, she was elected to the American Academy and Institute of Arts and Letters. For many years, Fine was a beloved member of the faculty of Bennington College in Vermont, where her students included composer Patsy Rogers. Her 1982 orchestral suite Drama for Orchestra was a finalist for the 1983 Pulitzer Prize for Music.

Fine's manuscripts are housed at the Library of Congress.

== Death ==
She died in Bennington, at the age of 86, following an automobile accident.
