= Tania León =

Cuban-American composer and conductor

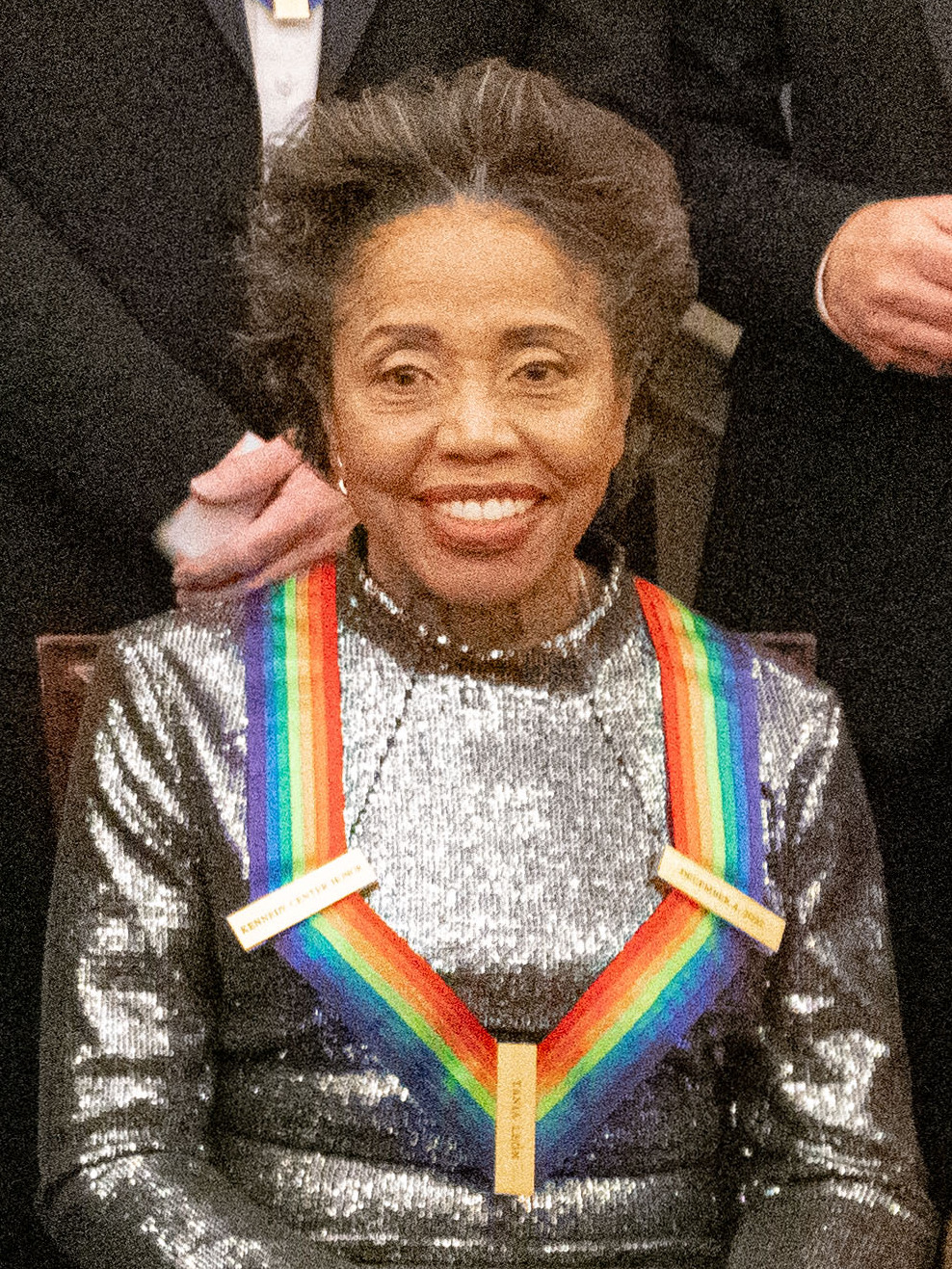
- Tania León, a 2022 Kennedy Center Honoree
- Born: May 14, 1943 (age 83); Havana, Cuba
- Occupation: Composer / conductor
- Awards: 2021 Pulitzer Prize for Music; New York Governor's Lifetime Achievement Award; 2022 Kennedy Center Honoree
- Website: http://www.tanialeon.com/

Tania León (born May 14, 1943) is a Cuban-born American composer of both large-scale and chamber works. She is also renowned as a conductor, educator, and advisor to arts organizations.

== Early years and education ==
She was born Tania Justina León in Havana, Cuba, of mixed French, Spanish, Chinese, African, and Cuban heritage. It was her grandmother who recognized that her granddaughter liked music because of the way she reacted to music on the radio. She began studying the piano at the age of four and she attended Carlos Alfredo Peyrellade Conservatory, where she earned a B.A. in 1963, and the Alejandro García Caturla Conservatory, where she studied piano with Zenaida Manfugás. Leon was one of an estimated 300,000 Cubans who left Cuba as a refugee on the so-called "Freedom Flights". In the spring of 1967 she left Cuba and settled in New York City, continuing her studies at New York University under the tutelage of Ursula Mamlok (B.S., 1971; M.S., 1975). She also began studying conducting under Leonard Bernstein and Seiji Ozawa.

== Career ==
In 1969, León became a founding member and the first musical director of Arthur Mitchell's Dance Theater of Harlem, establishing its music department, music school, and orchestra. Her ballet compositions for that company include Haiku (1973), Dougla (with Geoffrey Holder, 1974) and Belé (with Geoffrey Holder; 1981).

She instituted the Brooklyn Philharmonic Community Concert Series in 1977 and in 1994 co-founded the American Composers Orchestra Sonidos de las Americas Festivals as Latin American Music Advisor. From 1993 to 1997, she was New Music Advisor to Kurt Masur and the New York Philharmonic. She also served as Latin American Music Advisor to the American Composers Orchestra until 2001. In March 2001 her orchestral work Desde... was premiered by the American Composers Orchestra at Carnegie Hall.

She has been a guest conductor with the Beethovenhalle Orchestra, Bonn; the Gewandhausorchester, Leipzig; the Santa Cecilia Orchestra, Rome; the National Symphony Orchestra of South Africa, Johannesburg; the Netherlands Wind Ensemble, the Netherlands; and the New York Philharmonic, among others.

León's opera Scourge of Hyacinths, based on a radio play by Nobel Prize-winner Wole Soyinka, was commissioned in 1994 by the Munich Biennale, where it won the BMW Prize as best new opera. Staged and designed by Robert Wilson with León conducting, it has received over 22 performances in Germany, Switzerland, France and Mexico. The aria "Oh Yemanja" from Scourge was recorded by Dawn Upshaw on her Nonesuch CD The World So Wide.

León's composition Horizons, written for the NDR Symphony Orchestra of Hamburg, premiered at the July 1999 Hammoniale Festival, with Peter Ruzicka conducting. In August 2000, Horizons had its U.S. premiere at the Tanglewood Music Festival, with Stefan Asbury conducting. León conducted the work with the Orchestre Symphonique de Nancy (France) in March 2002.

Drummin', a full-length cross-cultural work for indigenous percussionists and orchestra, was commissioned and premiered in 1997 by Miami Light Project and the New World Symphony Orchestra. It opened the 1999 Hammoniale Festival in Hamburg.

In February 2020, the New York Philharmonic performed the world premiere of her composition Stride for orchestra.

León's recorded works include Batá, by the Foundation Philharmonic Orchestra, conducted by David Snell and produced by Sir George Martin; Indígena, a collection of León's chamber music; Carabalí (and already Batá) on the Louisville Orchestra’s First Edition Records; Rituál, for solo piano, and her arrangement of Moises Simons' song "El Manisero" for Chanticleer.

Tania León used award-winning Cuban-American poet Carlos Pintado’s poems to create Rimas Tropicales with a World premiere in June 2011 by one of the world's most respected vocal ensembles: the 5 times Grammy Award-winning group the San Francisco Girls Chorus.

== Awards, honors and recognition ==
In 1998, León was awarded the New York Governor's Lifetime Achievement Award. She has received honorary doctorates from Colgate University, Oberlin College, SUNY Purchase, and Columbia University, and awards from the John Simon Guggenheim Memorial Foundation, American Academy of Arts and Letters, the National Endowment for the Arts, Chamber Music America, NYSCA, the Lila Wallace Reader's Digest Fund, ASCAP, the Koussevitzky Music Foundation, and Meet the Composer, among others. In 1998, she held the Fromm Residency at the American Academy in Rome.

León has also been a resident at Yaddo (supported by a MacArthur Foundation Award), and at the Rockefeller Foundation’s Bellagio Center in Italy. She has also been a Visiting Lecturer at Harvard University, Visiting Professor at Yale University and the Musikschule in Hamburg.

In 2000, she was named the Tow Distinguished Professor at the Conservatory of Music at Brooklyn College, where she has taught since 1985. Brooklyn College is one of the senior colleges of the City University of New York (CUNY), where she is also on the faculty of the CUNY Graduate Center, in Manhattan.

León has been the subject of profiles on ABC, CBS, CNN, PBS, Univision and independent films.

In 2010, her work was performed in Cuba for the first time at the second annual Leo Brouwer Festival of Chamber Music. In 2010 and 2012, she was nominated for a Latin Grammy Award for Best Classical Contemporary Composition. She is the only Cuban and Cuban-American musician ever to be nominated for a Grammy Award for Best Contemporary Classical Composition (2013). She has been nominated for the award twice, for Inura, for voices, strings & percussion, and Raíces (Origins) for orchestra.

She won the 2021 Pulitzer Prize for Music for Stride, making her the first African-American woman composer to win the award. She was previously a finalist for the award in 2009-10 for her work Acana. The same work received a nomination for the Pulitzer Orpheus Prize in 2008.

In 2022, Tania was awarded a Kennedy Center Honor along with George Clooney, Amy Grant, Gladys Knight and the members of U2.

Northwestern University awarded León the 2023 Nemmers Prize in Music Composition.

She received in 2025 a Carnegie Corporation of New York Great Immigrant Award

== Works ==
=== Chamber works ===
- Young Songs (2026)
  - For Julia Bullock, Seth Parker Woods, and Conor Hanick
- A la Par, piano and percussion
- Ácana, chamber orchestra
- Alma, flute and piano
- Ascend, brass ensemble
- Axon, violin and electronics
- Bele, chamber orchestra
- De Color, violin and marimba
- De Memorias, woodwind quintet
- Dougla, large mixed ensemble
- Drummin', chamber orchestra
- entre nos, clarinet, bassoon, piano
- Escencia, string quartet
- Ethos, piano and string quartet
- Four Pieces for Cello, violoncello solo
- Haiku, percussion ensemble, large mixed ensemble
- Hechizos, chamber orchestra
- Indigena, large mixed ensemble
- Maggie Magalita, large mixed ensemble
- Paisanos Semos!, guitar solo
- Parajota Delate, mixed quintet
- Permutation Seven, mixed sextet
- Pet's Suite, flute and keyboard
- Saoko, brass quintet
- sin normas ajenas, large mixed ensemble
- Son Sonora, flute and guitar
- The Beloved, large mixed ensemble
- The Golden Windows, large mixed ensemble
- Tones, chamber orchestra
- Toque, clarinet, alto sax, piano, percussionists, violin, and double bass

=== Orchestral works ===
- Bata
- Carabali
- Concerto Criollo, piano, solo timpani and orchestra
- Desde...
- Horizons
- Kabiosile, piano and orchestra
- Para Viola y Orquesta, solo viola and orchestra
- Didn't My Lord Deliver Daniel (2005)
  - Commissioned by the Albany Symphony Orchestra
- Ácana (2008)
  - Commissioned by the Purchase College
- Ser (2017)
  - Commissioned by the Los Angeles Philharmonic and Gustavo Dudamel
- Stride (2019) for orchestra
  - Commissioned by the New York Philharmonic for "Project 19"
- Pasajes (2022) for orchestra
  - Arkansas Symphony Orchestra and supported by the Auburn Symphony Orchestra, Detroit Symphony Orchestra, National Symphony Orchestra, and Orlando Philharmonic Orchestra
- Raíces (Origins) (2024) for orchestra
  - Commissioned by the London Philharmonic Orchestra and the Concertgebouw Brugge
- Time to Time (2025) for orchestra

=== Vocal works ===
- Batey, vocal ensemble and instrumental ensemble
- De-Orishas, vocal ensemble (6 to 12 singers)
- Drume Negrita, mixed chorus
- El Manisero, mixed chorus
- Inura, mixed choir, strings, and percussion
- Ivo, Ivo, high voice and ensemble
- Journey, high voice and ensemble
- Oh Yemanja (Mother's Prayer), medium voice and ensemble
- Pueblo Mulato, high voice and ensemble
- Reflections, soprano and mixed ensemble (text from poems by Rita Dove)
- Rezos, mixed choir (text from Jamaica Kincaid)
- Singin' Sepia, medium voice and ensemble (text from poems by Rita Dove)
- Sol de Doce, vocal ensemble (6 to 12 singers),
- To and Fro, medium voice

=== Solo piano ===
- 2 Preludes (1966)
- Momentum (1984)
- Rituál (1987)
- Mística (2003)
- Variación (2004)
- La Tina (2004)
- Tumbao (2005)
- Para Noah (2006)
- Homenatge (2011)
- going...gone (2012)

=== Concert Band ===
- Alegre (2003)

=== Opera ===
- Scourge of Hyacinths

== Films ==
- 1993 – The Sensual Nature of Sound: 4 Composers – Laurie Anderson, Tania León, Meredith Monk, Pauline Oliveros. Directed by Michael Blackwood.
