= Jacob Druckman =

American composer (1928–1996)

- Born: June 26, 1928; Philadelphia, Pennsylvania, U.S.
- Died: May 24, 1996 (aged 67); New Haven, Connecticut, U.S.
- Education: Juilliard School
- Occupation: Composer
- Awards: Pulitzer Prize for Music (1972)

Jacob Raphael Druckman (June 26, 1928 – May 24, 1996) was an American composer.

== Life ==
A graduate of the Juilliard School in 1956, Druckman studied with Vincent Persichetti, Peter Mennin, and Bernard Wagenaar. In 1949 and 1950 he studied with Aaron Copland at Tanglewood; he continued his studies at the École Normale de Musique de Paris in 1954–55.

He worked extensively with electronic music, in addition to a number of works for orchestra or for small ensembles. In 1972, he won the Pulitzer Prize for Music for his first large orchestral work, Windows. He was composer-in-residence of the New York Philharmonic from 1982 until 1985. Druckman taught at Juilliard, The Aspen Music Festival, Tanglewood, Brooklyn College, Bard College, and Yale University, among other appointments. He was Connecticut's State Composer Laureate.

Druckman died of lung cancer at age 67 in New Haven, Connecticut. His music is published by Boosey & Hawkes. He is the father of percussionist Daniel Druckman.

The Aspen Music Festival gives out the Jacob Druckman award in his honor each festival season. The reward is given to an up-and-coming composer, who is then commissioned to write a piece to be performed in the next festival season.

Notable musicians who recorded his works include David Zinman, Wolfgang Sawallisch, Zubin Mehta, Leonard Slatkin, Dawn Upshaw, Jan DeGaetani, the Dorian Wind Quintet, the Orpheus Chamber Orchestra, and the American Brass Quintet.

== Major works ==
- String Quartet No. 1 (1948)
- The Seven Deadly Sins (1955), for piano
- Dark Upon the Harp (1961–1962), for mezzo-soprano, brass, and percussion. Setting of texts from the Biblical Psalms.
- String Quartet No. 2 (1966)
- Animus I (1966–1967), for trombone and electronic tape
- Animus II (1967–1968), for mezzo-soprano, percussion and electronic tape
- Animus III (1968), for clarinet and electronic tape
- Incenters (1968), for 13 Instruments
- Valentine (1969), for solo contrabass
- Synapse (1971), for tape
- Windows (1972), for orchestra
- Delizie Contente Che l'Alme Beate After Cavalli (1973), for wind quintet and tape
- Lamia (1975), for mezzo-soprano and orchestra. "The texts," according to the composer, "range from the most terrifying damnings of ancient witches to the most innocent folkloric dream-conjuration of provincial maidens."
- Other Voices (1976), for brass quintet
- Aureole (1979), for orchestra
- Prism (1980), for orchestra; draws on melodies from the operas of Marc-Antoine Charpentier, Francesco Cavalli, and Luigi Cherubini
- String Quartet No. 3 (1981)
- Vox Humana (1983), for chorus and orchestra
- Reflections on the Nature of Water (1986), for solo marimba
- Brangle (1988–1989), for orchestra
- Antiphonies, for two choruses; setting of poems by Gerard Manley Hopkins.
- Nor Spell Nor Charm (1990), for chamber orchestra
- Summer Lightning (1991), for orchestra
- Seraphic Games (1992), for orchestra
- Counterpoise (1994), for soprano and orchestra
