= Glitter, Shards, Doom, Memory =

Glitter, Doom, Shards, Memory is the third string quartet by the Israeli-born composer Shulamit Ran. The work was commissioned by the arts organization Music Accord for the Pacifica Quartet who first performed it on May 24, 2014, in Toronto.

== Composition ==
Glitter, Shards, Doom, Memory pays tribute to the Jewish artist Felix Nussbaum and other victims of the Holocaust. Ran wrote in the score program note, “As in several other works composed since 1969, this is my way of saying, ‘Do not forget,’ something that I believe can be done through music with special power and poignancy.” The title of the piece comes from an art exhibit of works from the Weimar Republic titled Glitter and Doom, which was formerly shown at the Metropolitan Museum of Art.

=== Structure ===
The work is composed in four movements:

1. That which happened
2. Menace
3. If I perish – do not let my paintings die
4. Shards, Memory

== Reception ==
Reviewing the United States premiere of Glitter, Doom, Shards, Memory, John Y. Lawrence of the Chicago Classical Review declared the piece "beautifully and thoughtfully crafted" and wrote:

At a time at which contemporary classical music is criticized for its inaccessibility to audiences, Ran's quartet is admirable for its emotional directness. It is almost Romantic in its clarity of gesture. There is never a haze of sound; there is always a strongly characterized figure being worked out, and each movement breaks down into well-defined sections with instantaneously palpable emotional arcs.

Zachary Woolfe of The New York Times also lauded the work, writing, "Ms. Ran's craftsmanship is, as ever, expert."

Hannah Nepil of the Financial Times was more critical of the piece, however, remarking that it was "a little too clever, and too artfully fragmented for its own good." He added:

This Israeli-American composer certainly doesn't lack imagination, and here it frequently surfaces: in the unearthly, sinister harmonies that open the piece; in the second movement, where stamping and whistling are ingeniously integrated into the compositional fabric. But the result often feels like a compendium of avant-garde techniques, with no overarching sense of trajectory — each idea too short-lived to sweep us up and carry us.
