= Cello Concerto (Albert) =

The Cello Concerto is a concerto for cello and orchestra by the American composer Stephen Albert. The work was commissioned by the Baltimore Symphony Orchestra for the cellist Yo-Yo Ma. It was given its world premiere by Yo-Yo Ma and the Baltimore Symphony Orchestra under the direction of David Zinman in Baltimore, May 1990. It was one of Albert's last completed compositions before his death in December 1992. The piece was later awarded the 1995 Grammy Award for Best Classical Contemporary Composition.

According to musicologist David Grayson, "Albert composed the Cello Concerto between June 1989 and January 1990 and completed the orchestration by March. In the process, the work expanded considerably beyond its original project length". The work received its premiere on May 31, 1990, with Yo-Yo Ma as the soloist. (ibid)

== Structure ==
The 1993 world premiere recording of Albert's Cello Concerto, performed by Yo-Yo Ma (Baltimore SO, cond. David Zinman) for Sony Classical's The New York Album (1994), lasts for about 32'11". Accordingly, the Concerto is composed in four movements, with the following tempo and character designations:

1. Audacemente ma sostenuto (6'38")
2. Con brio – instante (urgent) (5'43")
3. Larghetto (9'50")
4. Con moto; con imminenzo e inquieto (10'00")

== Appreciation ==
The cellist Yo-Yo Ma has stated about the work: "[Albert] puts [the themes] through all sorts of rhythmical and technical gyrations, and they emerge transformed, in a kind of catharsis. The Concerto, I believe, is an accurate mirror of what was going on in his life [in particular, his struggles with creative blocks and his response to the death of his father, to whose memory the concerto is dedicated]. In that sense, it is like one of the old romantic concertos — an autobiography of the wounded hero. This music is in the strongest sense personal and soulful, and it takes us through the same emotional journey Stephen was going through when he composed it. I love playing it, and I believe it will have a good life. It is playable, practical, rewarding, and its says something personal."

== Reception ==
Andrew Clements of BBC Music Magazine praised the Cello Concerto as a "real novelty", remarking, "It is a beautifully wrought, coherent work, with some striking moments of dark introspection and a tragic cast that is truly impressive." Gramophone called the work "a pretty riveting experience" and wrote:

Fairly cosmopolitan in overall style (audible influences include Sibelius and Bernstein), it opens with an intense, rhapsodizing solo, before a blast of brass and a flurry of strings make way for a Mahlerian rising figure on the woodwind and a good deal of agitated argument. Ideas throughout are darkly colourful but conventional, although Albert's score incorporates imaginative use of brass, harp (especially in its lower registers), piano and heavy percussion. There's a scurrying scherzo, a pensive Larghetto (which opens with a Britten-style brass clarion call) and a ten-minute finale that occasionally suggests Bartok or the Stravinsky of the Symphony in Three Movements.
