= Stephen Albert =

American composer (1941–1992)

- Alpert c. late 1980s
- Born: Stephen Joel Albert; February 6, 1941; New York City, US
- Died: December 27, 1992 (aged 51); Truro, Massachusetts, US
- Spouse: Marilyn Blanche Silagy (m. 1965)
- Children: 2
- Awards: Rome Prize (1965, 1966); Guggenheim Fellowship (1967, 1978); Pulitzer Prize for Music (1985)

Stephen Joel Albert (February 6, 1941 – December 27, 1992) was an American composer. He is best known for his Pulitzer Prize winning Symphony No. 1 RiverRun (1983) and his Cello Concerto (1990), written for Yo-Yo Ma. He made sketches for a Second Symphony, but was unable to complete it before his death in an automobile accident in 1992. The work was subsequently completed by Sebastian Currier. Albert was posthumously commemorated in music by fellow composers Aaron Jay Kernis and Christopher Rouse.

== Biography ==
=== Childhood ===
Albert was born on February 6, 1941, in the Jamaica neighborhood of the borough of Queens in New York City. He was one of two children born to Jeanette (née Robbins) and Sidney G. Albert.

He lived his childhood in the village of Great Neck, where at an early age he developed his interest in music. During his elementary school years he feigned illness in order to stay home and play on the family piano. He also studied French horn and trumpet during this period, though he later told the music critic Richard Dyer that he had been "a terrible player".

Formative in Albert's development were early hearings of music by Domenico Scarlatti, which he first heard on an LP his brother had brought home, and recordings of music by Richard Wagner conducted by Arturo Toscanini:

Something caught me — I didn't take it for granted and listened over and over again to find out what it was. It was the same way with Toscanini's record of Wagner... I loved the sunlight-and-shadow quality of that music; it was like wandering in a dark forest, and then, suddenly, there would come a luminous clearing.

Albert's first attempts at composition began at the age of 13. They originated from musical games and improvisations he played with fellow students at Camp Greylock, a boys' summer camp in Becket, Massachusetts. When he returned home, he began to study piano with Leonid Hambro, to whom he had been referred by another piano teacher. Although Albert considered himself an unskilled student, he credited Hambro for cultivating his musical appreciation, especially of 20th-century music, to which he previously expressed antipathy. In 1988 he told the Philadelphia Inquirer that in his youth he disliked the Second Viennese School and Béla Bartók, and that he preferred the Four Last Songs by Richard Strauss. He described his musical tastes as "non-20th-century", and said that the composers he had admired most were Modest Mussorgsky and Nikolai Rimsky-Korsakov. Albert's dislike of Arnold Schoenberg and the musical attitudes his school fostered continued into adulthood, but he later regarded Bartók as one of the composers "from the margins of European life" he held in highest regard.

=== Education ===
==== In search of guidance ====
Taking note of Albert's aptitude for composition, Hambro introduced him to Elie Siegmeister. Albert studied composition with him from 1956 to 1958; he later expressed gratitude to Siegmeister for deepening his understanding of musical analysis.

Later in 1958, Albert went to the Aspen Music Festival and School, where he enrolled as one of the youngest students in Darius Milhaud's composition class. Against his teacher's advice, Albert subsequently continued his musical education at the Eastman School of Music, where he rapidly became dissatisfied with its pedagogy. Thereafter he left for Sweden to study for a short period with Karl-Birger Blomdahl.

==== Studies with Rochberg ====
In the early 1960s Albert returned to the United States, and enrolled at the University of Pennsylvania as a graduate student of George Rochberg. At his preliminary enrollment audition, an interviewer who had read through Albert's compositional portfolio noted the music's traditionalism and strongly criticized it. Angered by the comment, Albert briefly considered abandoning music in favor of jurisprudence. With atonal and experimental music in the ascendant, what he retrospectively described as an "atmosphere of terrorism" beset musical academia of this period. "There were no two sides to the issue", he noted. Dissent from prevailing attitudes, he also said, was responded to by the academic establishment with a notion that if "[you did] not believe in [serialism or experimental music], that you were wrong, that you were morally culpable". Albert was, therefore, surprised when Rochberg, then an advocate of serialism, approached him with a personal invitation to join his class shortly after this incident.

In Rochberg, Albert found a friend and, unexpectedly, a senior musical figure sympathetic to his own aesthetic ideals. They met for lunch on a weekly basis to discuss contemporary musical affairs in the United States. Catalyzed by younger students who questioned the musical avant-garde, Rochberg in the early 1960s was beginning his own stylistic transformation into a music that referenced the past. Conversely, Albert was grateful to Rochberg for helping him to maintain his interest in musical composition. Their friendship also offered them relief from personal worries both composers were facing: Albert from a recently ended romantic relationship, Rochberg from his son's terminal brain cancer diagnosis.

Though Albert had studied with Rochberg and credited his teacher with guiding him through a difficult time, he clarified that he did not regard himself as part of a "Rochberg school". His musical evolution had occurred concurrently and, sometimes, anticipated Rochberg's. Their friendship continued for the rest of Albert's life. Its dynamic demonstrated, according to the musicologist Amy Lynn Wlodarski, "that the sphere of influence and guidance was neither unilateral nor top-down — from teacher to student — but rather reciprocal".

==== Uncertainty ====
In addition, he also studied at the Philadelphia Musical Academy with Joseph Castaldo, who introduced him to string quartets by Bartók and Alban Berg. Albert earned his degree from the institution in 1962, which at the time was not accredited; it was the only schooling in higher education that he completed.

Various factors dissuaded Albert from continuing further musical studies: health problems, dislike of mainstream musical pedagogy, and his opposition to the trends shaped by the composers of the Columbia-Princeton Electronic Music Center. In 1990 he told the Baltimore Sun that his decision to abandon higher education had been "a real gamble".

=== Early career ===
Albert composed in various musical genres during the 1960s, with his electronic and atonal music the first to gain him wider professional attention. He earned the Rome Prize in 1965 and 1966. In 1967 he was awarded a Guggenheim Fellowship, the first of two he would earn. That same year, he was hired for his first professional teaching post in the public school system of Lima, Ohio.

Influenced by the music of Johannes Brahms and Gustav Mahler, as well as with Rochberg's support, Albert's approach to composition in the mid-1960s shifted towards 19th-century musical procedures. With this stylistic turn, according to the Washington Post, Albert thereby became one of the "trendsetters for the baby-boom generation's revolt against academicism". The composer Christopher Rouse, a friend and colleague, called him "one of the founding fathers of... the new romanticism". As Albert explained in an interview to the Baltimore Sun in 1990:

I felt that music had reached an impasse. The only real masterpieces [composed] after World War II had been by [Dmitri] Shostakovich. The only place most new music was going was over a cliff into an abyss, and the so-called conservative alternative seemed to be mired in stasis. The only way out of it, it seemed to me, was to go back to where music had been shortly before the turn of the century... I wanted a complexity of inner textures that bears repeated hearings and I wanted at the same to have a surface accessibility.

In 1968 and 1969, Albert composed what Wlodarski called one of his "most dissonant and cataclysmic" scores, Wolf Time. A response to the "political assassinations, [the] Vietnam War, and other grim realities of American life", the work was inspired by the composer's reading of the poetry of Immanuel Velikovsky. A few years later, in 1971 and 1972, a viewing of a documentary about Pablo Casals that included a scene in a cathedral of the cellist playing one of the Cello Suites by Johann Sebastian Bach led Albert to compose an electro-acoustic work, Cathedral Music. The musicologist Mary Lou Humphrey cited it as among the earliest of Albert's scores that bore his characteristic "juxtaposition and gradual unification of fragmentary musical ideas".

During the early 1970s, Albert lived in Philadelphia and taught part-time at his alma mater, the Philadelphia Musical Academy. Through his teaching work he met William Smith, the associate conductor of the Philadelphia Orchestra, who in turn introduced the composer to Carlo Maria Giulini. Curious about Albert's music, the conductor requested to see some of his scores; he received a copy of Leaves from the Golden Notebook, a work for electric guitar, bass, and orchestra. Giulini sensed it was an important work, but was dissatisfied with aspects of it. After he discussed his concerns with Albert, the composer amended a number of passages.

On December 3, 1971, Giulini conducted the Chicago Symphony Orchestra in the premiere of Leaves from the Golden Notebook. The music critic Earl Calloway, in a review for the New Pittsburgh Courier, praised Albert for his "interesting collages of sound textures" and "adventurous musical spirit". Another review, by Thomas Willis for the Chicago Tribune, discussed Albert and his music further:

... I confess that... Albert was known to me only as a name... I was much better acquainted with... Giulini's musical tastes — conservative, theme-oriented, and highly color-conscious. With that "Golden Notebook" title, I was prepared for a neo-romantic tone poem of some sort. How wrong I was. The 30-year-old composer... is no flaming radical but he is hardly a conservative as the word is generally used. The four leaves from his notebook... suggest a sort of musical man with a golden arm. This is not meant as disapproval. Expressionist music is very effective on the psychological level, as anyone who listens to some of the middle-level movie scores knows. Albert's [Leaves from the Golden Notebook] have a hallucinated, schizoid aura, part fantasy, part dream. The most vivid passages streak the large orchestra's range of colors and lines with sharp fragments resembling half-remembered motives from unfamiliar symphonies and concertos. The rest contains much punctuation, little rhetoric, and an unclear, often diffuse syntax.

The work was subsequently played by the Philadelphia Orchestra in March 1972. The critic Daniel Webster's review for the Philadelphia Inquirer noted the "introspective way" that Albert's score employed saxophones, electric guitar, and a large percussion section, as well as the "novelistic approach" the composer used in developing his music.

=== Crises and breakthrough ===
Throughout the early 1970s, Albert's livelihood was sustained by a series of grants and commissions, including from the Ford Foundation, Fromm Foundation, National Endowment for the Arts, and the Martha Baird Rockefeller Fund for Music. By the middle of the decade these supplements to his income largely ceased. In addition, he did not want to further pursue teaching as a vocation, citing what he called his "phobic reaction" to teaching institutions. Instead he turned his childhood interest in philately into a successful home business dealing in rare stamps. "This seemed better to me than teaching", he said, "because I could do it as a mail order business out of the house and keep on composing full-time". The resulting income he earned allowed Albert to remain financially independent for the next ten years.

Another more serious crisis emerged from a bleeding ulcer he had incurred in 1976. His convalescence ultimately lasted more than three years, during which time he perceived that his musical output had deteriorated; he later said that he felt unable to compose. It was during this period that he developed a daily routine of sitting at his upright piano in his basement, and playing through the Piano Concerto No. 2 by Johannes Brahms. Albert adopted this practice in order to better understand how 19th-century composers constructed and elaborated their music, having never learned their techniques himself. Utilizing painting as a comparison, he said that as "with Rembrandt, [where] every part of [the painted background] is alive" in Brahms "every part of this [musical] texture is alive". The result of this experience with the concerto, the composer said, was "a quantum leap... a stunning musical breakthrough" for him personally, with the insights gained from this period applied in his subsequent works.

=== Maturity ===
From 1985 to 1988 he worked as the Seattle Symphony's composer-in-residence.

His notable students included Daniel Asia, Amanda Harberg, and Dan Coleman.

=== Death ===
On the afternoon of December 27, 1992, Albert and his family were traveling southbound in their Acura sedan through moderately heavy traffic on Route 6 in Cape Cod. According to reports, they were returning to their home in Newton, Massachusetts from another home they owned in Truro. At approximately 3:15 p.m., Albert swerved his car onto the northbound lane, sideswiped a Volkswagen Jetta, then collided directly with a Ford Aerostar. Albert, who was trapped in his car, was declared dead at the scene; he was the only fatality in the three-vehicle collision. Preliminary investigations by the Truro Police concluded that alcohol intoxication was not a factor in the accident.

== Personal life ==
Albert married Marilyn Blanche Silagy on August 7, 1965, at a wedding ceremony held at The Pierre in New York City. The couple had two children.

== Awards and honors ==
Stephen Albert was awarded Guggenheim Fellowships for Music Composition in 1968 and 1978. He won the 1985 Pulitzer Prize for Music for his Symphony No. 1, RiverRun. He posthumously won a Grammy Award in 1995 in the Best Classical Contemporary Composition category for his Cello Concerto as performed by Yo-Yo Ma in a 1990 recording with the Baltimore Symphony Orchestra, conducted by David Zinman.

== Works ==
A number of Albert's works were based on James Joyce texts. Finnegans Wake inspired three of Albert's pieces: To Wake the Dead, TreeStone, and Symphony RiverRun. Albert's paired "Distant Hills" arias Flower of the Mountain and Sun's Heat were based on Ulysses, and the song "Ecce Puer" from Joyce's poem of the same name.

His Cello Concerto began as a request from the Baltimore Symphony in 1987 for a 15-minute orchestral piece. In 1988 the commission was changed to a concerto for Yo-Yo Ma. The composer credited Ma with his help completing the work. Albert started with material drawn two earlier works from 1988, "Anthem and Processionals" and "The Stone Harp." He started the composition in 1989 and finished in 1990. The premiere was on 31 March 1990 and featured Yo-Yo Ma along with the Baltimore Symphony Orchestra conducted by David Zinman. A revised version was featured on a 1993 album, "The New York Album."

According to Yo-Yo Ma, the composition was a "kind of catharsis." It incorporated struggles in his life, including his writer's blocks and the death of his father. The work is dedicated to the memory of his father.

=== Orchestral ===
- Anthems and Processionals (1988) – 16 minutes
- Into Eclipse (chamber with voice version) (1981) – 30 minutes
- Symphony No. 1 RiverRun (1983) – 33 minutes
- Symphony No. 2 (1992) – 30 minutes (orchestration completed by Sebastian Currier)
- Tapioca Pudding (1991) – 2 minutes

=== Concertante ===
- Concerto for Violoncello and Orchestra (1990) – 30 minutes
- Distant Hills (orchestra version) (1989) – 31 minutes
- Flower of the Mountain from "Distant Hills" (orchestra version) (1985) – 16 minutes
- In Concordiam (1986) – 17 minutes
- Into Eclipse (orchestra with voice version) (1981) – 30 minutes
- Sun's Heat from "Distant Hills" (orchestra version) (1989) – 15 minutes
- Wind Canticle for Clarinet and Orchestra (1991) – 14 minutes
- Wolf Time (1968) – 20 minutes

=== Ensemble (7 or more players) ===
- Distant Hills (chamber version) (1989) – 31 minutes
- Flower of the Mountain from "Distant Hills" (chamber version) (1985) – 16 minutes
- Sun's Heat from "Distant Hills" (chamber version) (1989) – 15 minutes
- TreeStone (1983) – 45 minutes

=== Chamber ===
- Tribute (1988) – 9 minutes

=== Choral ===
- Bacchae: A Ceremony in Music (1967) – 8 minutes

=== Vocal ===
- Ecce Puer (1992) – 6 minutes
- Rilke Song – On Nights Like This (1991) – 5 minutes
- The Stone Harp (1988) – 14 minutes
- To Wake the Dead (1977) – 25 minutes
- Wedding Songs (1964) – 10 minutes

== Posthumous tributes ==
Several composers posthumously commemorated Albert's life and work in their music. In 1993, Aaron Jay Kernis dedicated his Still Movement with Hymn, a composition for piano quartet, in memory of Albert. The following year, in 1994, Christopher Rouse composed in his Symphony No. 2 a slow movement that was a memorial to Albert. Edward Applebaum in his Symphony No. 4 from 1995 contributed another symphonic elegy to Albert's memory. The symphony contains musical quotations from Albert's music, including of "Albert quoting Mahler".

For a January 2002 concert commemorating Albert, Jonathan Leshnoff and James Willey each composed works in his memory. The former's Racing Pulse for orchestra was based on memories of the composer's studies with Albert, in particular his theories about harmony. Willey's contribution was Three Pieces in Memory of Stephen Albert, a tripartite chamber work scored for viola, clarinet, and piano.
