= Still Movement with Hymn =

- by Aaron Jay Kernis
- Form: piano quartet
- Performed: 11 November 1993: Princeton University
- Published: 1993: Associated Music Publishers

Still Movement with Hymn is a composition for piano quartet by the American composer Aaron Jay Kernis. It was composed in 1993 and was given its world premiere at Princeton University on November 11, 1993. It is dedicated to the memory of the composer Stephen Albert, who died unexpectedly in 1992. The piece was a finalist for the 1994 Pulitzer Prize for Music.

== Composition ==
Still Movement with Hymn has a duration of roughly 25 minutes and is composed in a single slow movement divided into three sections. Kernis described the composition in the score program note, writing:

During the year or two preceding its creation, I composed three serious and intense works, all of which nourished and influenced the present work: Hymn for solo accordion, Aria-Lament for solo violin, and the English horn concerto Colored Field. I would call all of this music mournful, tragic, and elegiac. These pieces are also unified by the influence of medieval and Jewish music and their use of long, unbroken melodies. Much of the emotional tenor of these works stems from reaction, albeit at a distance, to the genocide in Bosnia and Croatia along with the disbelief and loss of innocence that comes from learning that the world that most of us believe we live in, one that's rational, compassionate, and forgiving, seems so banal and fragile in light of the force of ethnic hatred and brutality. This music is in no way programmatic, but it does at times suggest a Judeo-Christian prayer for the dead, a hymn and Kaddish that also embodies hope for the living.

=== Instrumentation ===
The work is scored for a piano quartet consisting of violin, viola, cello, and piano.

== Reception ==
Reviewing a recording of the work, the music critic Joshua Kosman of the San Francisco Chronicle called it "a potent elegy for piano and strings" and wrote, "The score itself, with its anguished climaxes and interludes of serene mourning, is exquisite."
