= Gilbert Kalish =

American pianist (born 1935)

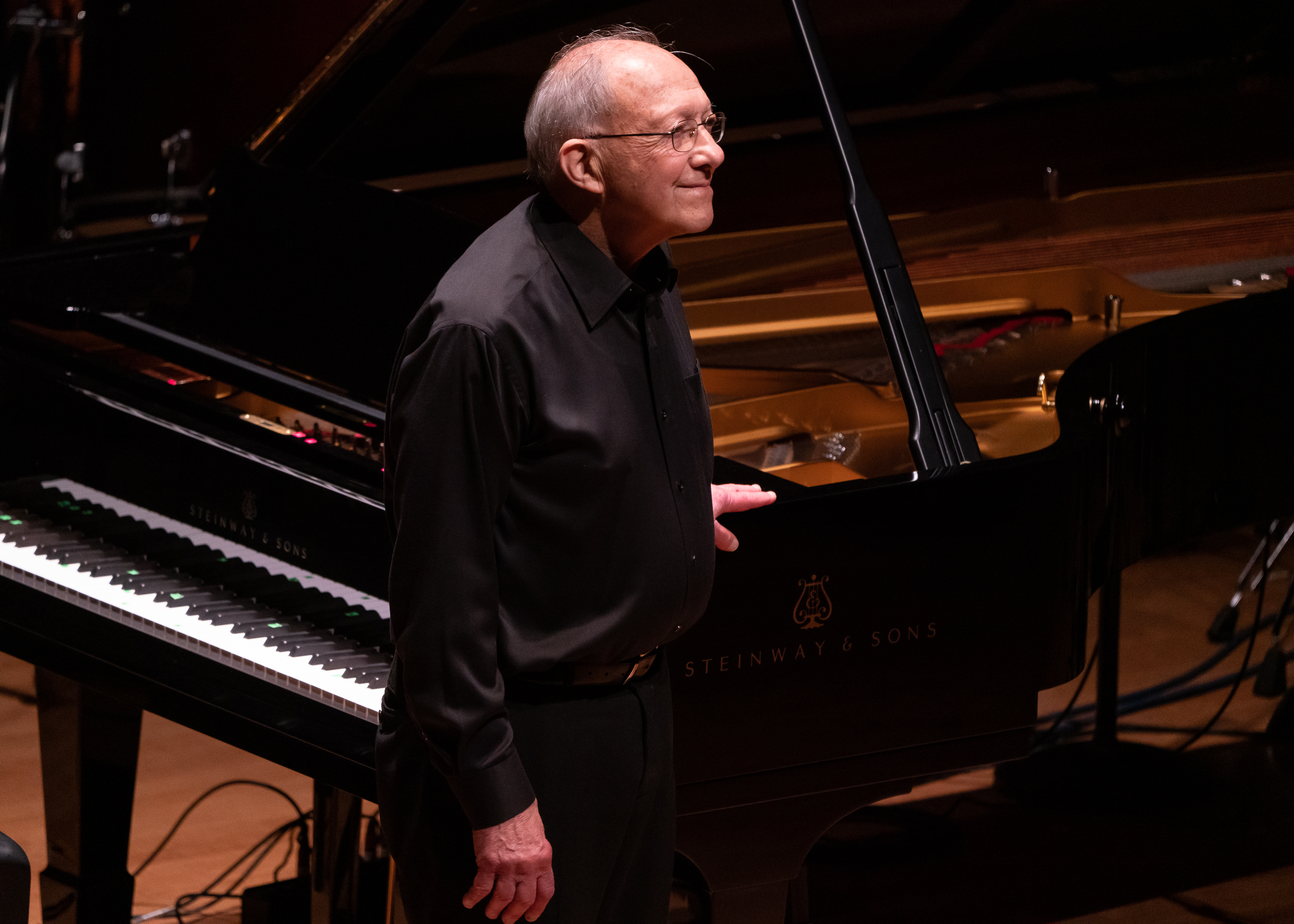
Gilbert Kalish after performing at a concert in honor of the 90th birthday of George Crumb at Alice Tully Hall

Gilbert Kalish (born July 2, 1935) is an American pianist. He is best known for championing the music of Charles Ives and other modernist composers. He is also noted for his partnerships with other artists, particularly his thirty-year collaboration with mezzo-soprano Jan DeGaetani, but also including cellists Timothy Eddy and Joel Krosnick, and soprano Dawn Upshaw.

== Life and career ==
Gilbert Kalish was born on July 2, 1935 in Brooklyn, New York and studied with Leonard Shure, Julius Hereford and Isabelle Vengerova. He was a founding member of the Contemporary Chamber Ensemble, a pioneering new music group that flourished during the 1960s and '70s. He was a pianist of the Boston Symphony Chamber Players from 1969 to 1998.

Kalish is Leading Professor and Head of Performance Activities at the State University of New York at Stony Brook. From 1968 to 1997, he was a faculty member of the Tanglewood Music Center and served as the "Chairman of the Faculty" at Tanglewood from 1985 to 1997. He has also served on the faculties of the Banff Centre and the Steans Institute at Ravinia, and is renowned for his master class presentations.

Kalish has a large discography, encompassing classical repertory, 20th-century masterworks and new compositions. These include his solo recordings of Charles Ives' Concord Sonata and sonatas of Joseph Haydn, vocal music with Jan DeGaetani and landmarks of the 20th-century by composers such as Elliott Carter, George Crumb, Ralph Shapey, and Arnold Schoenberg. He made the world premiere recordings of Charles Ives' Largo for Violin and Piano, In Re Con Moto et al., Largo Risoluto No. 1 & 2, A Set of Three Short Pieces, and songs The All-Enduring, The Innate, and Song (She is not fair). Kalish appeared on Charles Schwartz's 1979 jazz symphony Mother______! Mother______!! with Clark Terry and Zoot Sims.

Kalish has given many first performances, and has had many works written for him. He gave the first solo piano recital in the newly renovated Miller Theatre at Columbia University. He has received many honours, including four Grammy Award nominations, and the 2022 Grammy Award for Best Contemporary Classical Composition for his performance on composer Caroline Shaw’s “Narrow Sea” along with singer Dawn Upshaw and So Percussion. In 1995, he was presented with the Paul Fromm Award by the University of Chicago Music Department for distinguished service to the music of our time.
