= Stride (composition) =

Orchestral composition by Tania León

Stride is an orchestral composition by the Cuban-American composer Tania León. The work was commissioned by the New York Philharmonic and the Oregon Symphony as part of the New York Philharmonic's "Project 19," an initiative commissioning new works by 19 female composers in honor of the centennial of the ratification of the Nineteenth Amendment to the United States Constitution. It was first performed by the New York Philharmonic under the direction of Jaap van Zweden in David Geffen Hall, New York City, on February 13, 2020. The piece is dedicated “In honor of Susan B. Anthony and to the visionaries Deborah Borda and Jaap van Zweden." The piece was awarded the 2021 Pulitzer Prize for Music.

== Composition ==
Stride is cast in a single movement and has a performance duration of approximately 15 minutes. In a pre-premiere interview, León revealed that the music was inspired by the suffragist Susan B. Anthony and the composer's progressive grandmother. The work's title thus refers to the action of moving forward.

=== Instrumentation ===
The work is scored for a large orchestra consisting of three flutes (one doubling piccolo), two oboes, English horn, three clarinets, two bassoons, contrabassoon, four horns, three trumpets, three trombones, tuba, timpani, percussion (marimba, tubular bells, bass drum, tom-toms, bongos, vibraphone, roto-toms, cymbals, sand blocks, crotales, small bass drum, djembe, timbales, tambourine, sizzle cymbal), harp, and strings.

== Reception ==
Reviewing the world premiere, Zachary Woolfe of The New York Times described the music as possessing "unsettled understatement and quietly ominous power." He also noted, "Stride—which Ms. León described as being about bounding forward—seems an odd title for a piece that is, beautifully, without much sense of forward motion." Jay Nordlinger of The New Criterion wrote, "It is Bernsteinian in parts, reminiscent of West Side Story. Listening, I thought of the term 'jazz-tinged modernism.' There are clarinet licks and the like—riffing and noodling. There is also a great deal of percussion. Obviously, the piece is composed with fondness. Fondness counts for a lot, and so does sincerity. But did Stride seem long to me? I'm afraid it did, as my regular readers would expect."
