= Drama for Orchestra =

Orchestral suite

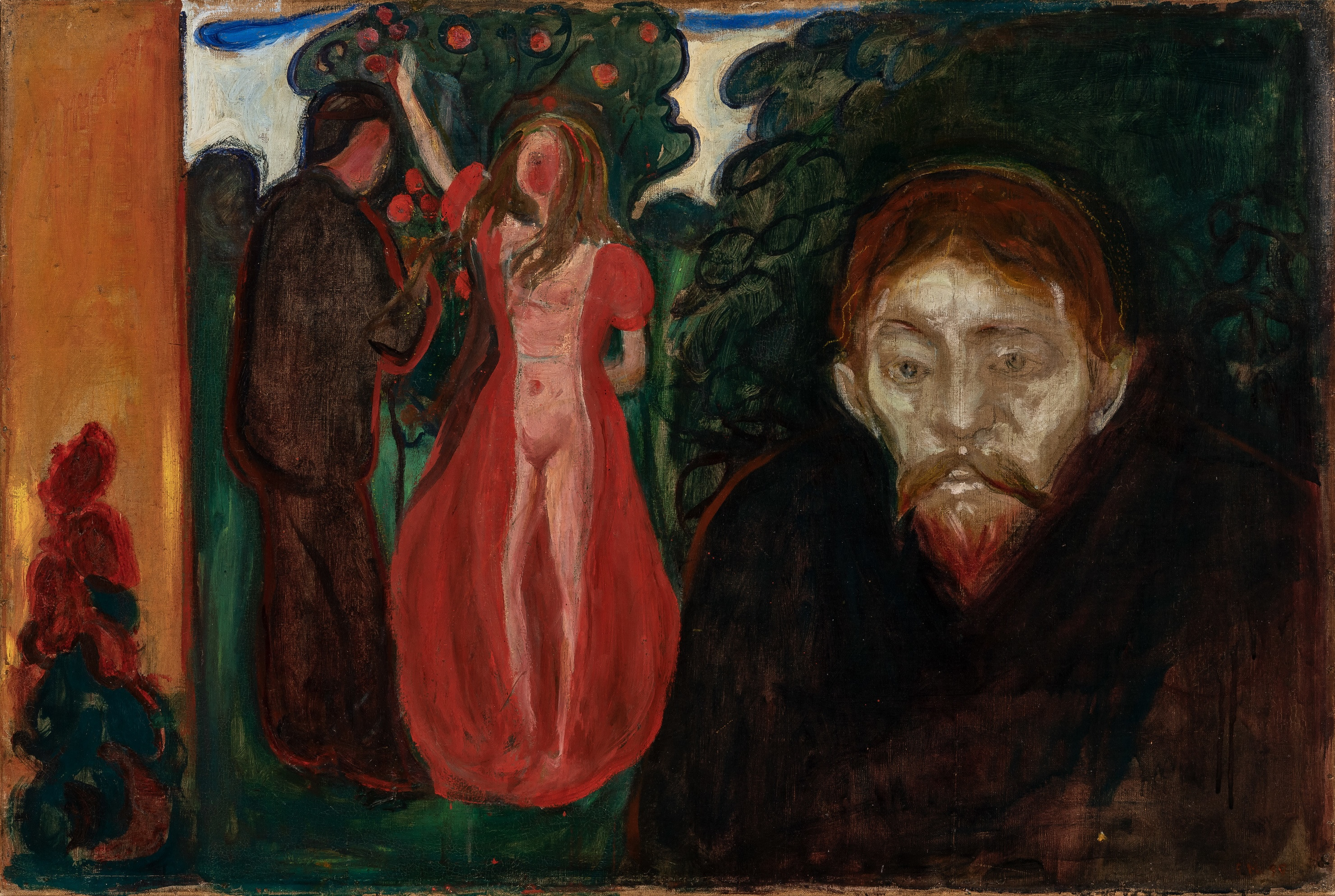
Drama for Orchestra was inspired by the paintings of Edvard Munch, such as Jealousy (pictured above).

Drama for Orchestra is an orchestral suite written by the American composer Vivian Fine. The work was commissioned by the San Francisco Symphony with support from Dr. and Mrs. Ralph Dorfman. It was inspired by the works of the Norwegian painter Edvard Munch. The music was completed on April 24, 1982, and was first performed by the San Francisco Symphony under the direction of Edo de Waart at Louise M. Davies Symphony Hall on January 5, 1983. Drama for Orchestra was a finalist for the 1983 Pulitzer Prize for Music.

== Composition ==
Drama for Orchestra has a performance duration of approximately 20 minutes and is cast in five movements each named after the Edvard Munch painting of its inspiration:

1. Midsummer Night
2. The Embrace
3. Jealousy
4. The Scream
5. Two Figures by the Shore

=== Instrumentation ===
The music is scored for a large orchestra consisting of four flutes (doubling piccolo), four oboes (doubling English horn), four clarinets (doubling bass clarinet), four bassoons (doubling contrabassoon), six horns, four trumpets, two trombones, bass trombone, tuba, timpani, three percussionists, harp, piano (doubling celesta), and strings.
