= Windows (Druckman) =

Orchestral composition

- by Jacob Druckman
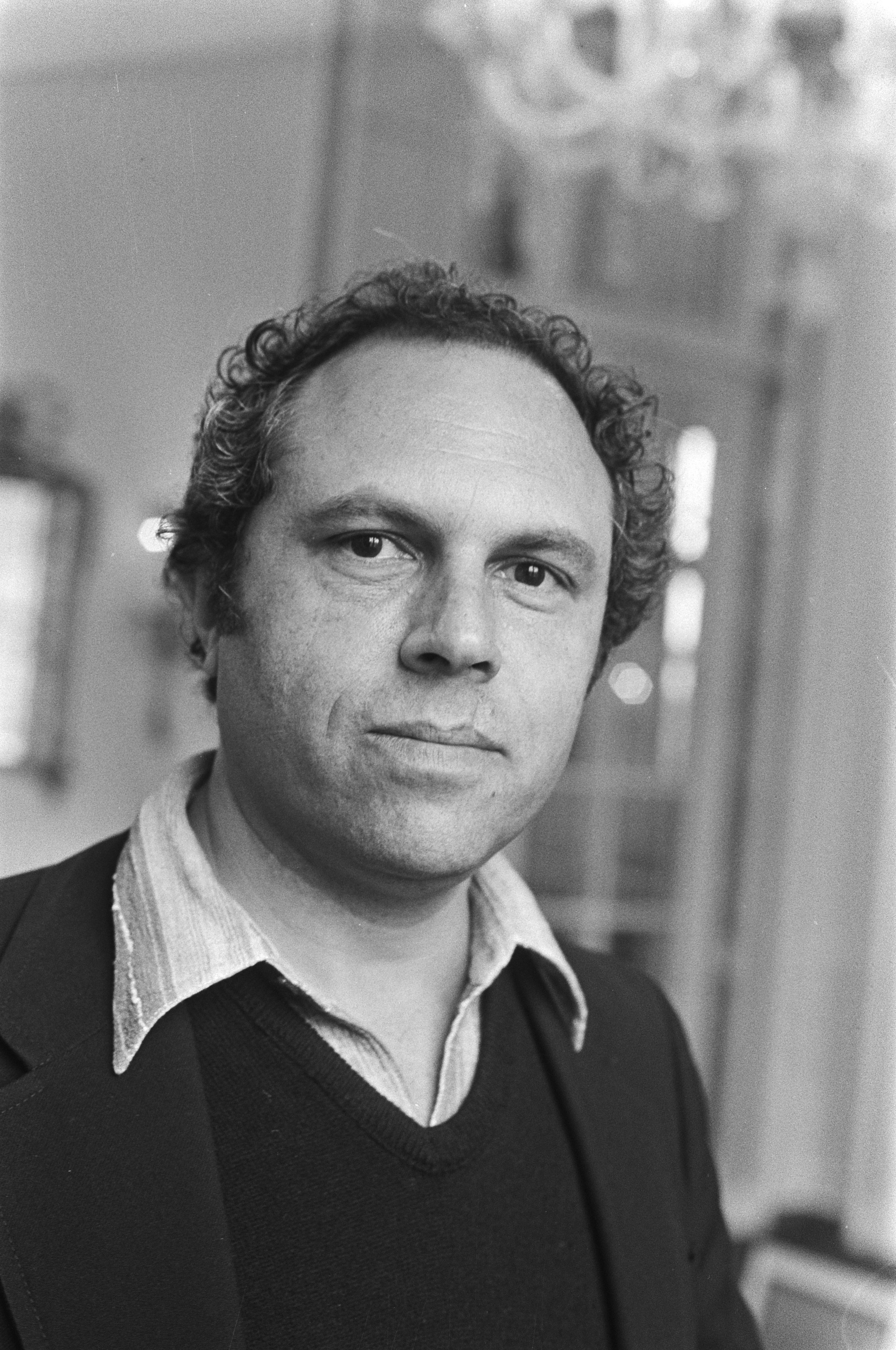
- Jacob Duckman, 1976
- Commissioned by: Serge Koussevitzky Music Foundation
- Composed: 1972
- Dedication: Serge and Natalie Koussevitzky
- Duration: about 20 minutes
- Movements: One
- Scoring: Orchestra

Premiere
- Date: 16 March 1972
- Location: Orchestra Hall, Chicago
- Conductor: Bruno Maderna
- Performers: Chicago Symphony

Windows is a one-movement orchestral composition written by Jacob Druckman in 1972. It won the Pulitzer Prize for Music in the same year. Windows was commissioned by the Serge Koussevitzky Music Foundation for conductor Bruno Maderna and the Chicago Symphony Orchestra and is dedicated to conductor Serge Koussevitzky and his wife Natalie.

Druckman himself explained the name of the composition as follows:

The 'Windows' of the title are windows inward. They are points of light which appear as the thick orchestral textures part, allowing us to hear, fleetingly, moments out of time – memories, not of any music that ever existed before, but memories of memories, shadows of ghosts. The imagery is as though, having looked at an unpeopled wall of windows, one looks away and sees the afterimage of a face.

Much of the work involves the use of aleatoric processes, similar to those associated with Witold Lutosławski. Windows was originally going to share a program with Claude Debussy's Jeux when it was premiered and Druckman wanted to pay homage to Debussy.

A typical performance of the piece lasts about 20 minutes.

== Instrumentation ==
The work is written for an orchestra with the following instrumentation.

Woodwinds
3 flutes (3rd doubles piccolos)
2 oboes
1 English horn
2 B♭ clarinets
1 B♭ bass clarinet
2 bassoons
1 contrabassoon

Brass
4 horns (asst. 1st and 3rd advisable)
3 trumpets (C)
3 trombones (3rd tenor-bass with F attachment)
1 tuba

Other
1 harp
1 keyboard player playing piano and electric organ

Percussion (3 players)
1 glockenspiel
1 vibraphone
1 marimba
1 steel drum
chimes
1 timpani
2 bass drums
2 conga drums
1 snare drum
1 pair of timbales
2 pairs of bongos
3 temple blocks
2 wood blocks
2 tam-tams
2 gongs (mid-range, without definite pitch)
2 large suspended cymbals
2 small suspended cymbals
1 large sizzle cymbal
1 heavy spring coil with sizzles
1 saw

Strings
violins
violas
cellos
contrabasses
