= Susan Davenny-Wyner =

American opera singer

Susan Davenny Wyner (born Susan Davenny, October 17, 1943) is a nationally acclaimed American conductor based in Massachusetts. Davenny Wyner had a promising career as a soprano, which was ended by an automobile/bicycling accident that damaged her vocal cords.

== Early life and education ==
Davenny Wyner was born October 17, 1943, in New Haven, Connecticut, where her father, pianist Ward Davenny, was professor of music at Yale University. She was originally trained as a violinist and violist. Following early studies at the Cleveland Institute of Music and the Hartford School of Music, she graduated summa cum laude from Cornell University in 1965 with degrees in both comparative English literature and in music. She entered into vocal studies with Herta Glaz from 1969 to 1975. She received a Fulbright scholarship and a grant from the Ford Foundation, and also won the Walter W. Naumberg Prize.

== Career ==
=== Career as soprano ===
She made her solo debut as a vocalist with the Boston Symphony Orchestra in 1974. She was a soloist in Georg Handel's Messiah under Sir Colin Davis with the Boston Symphony Orchestra. She sang in Ludwig van Beethoven's Ninth at the Kennedy Center in Washington, D.C., under Leonard Bernstein, who invited her to perform his own Kaddish Symphony and Songfest. Davenny Wyner made her first New York City Opera appearance as Claudio Monteverdi's Poppea October 23, 1977. She received critical acclaim as the lead role in Maurice Ravel's opera L'Enfant et les Sortileges with Andre Previn; that 1981 recording was reissued in 1995 on the EMI Eminence label. Ms. Wyner made her Metropolitan Opera debut as Woglinde in Das Rheingold under Erich Leinsdorf, on October 8, 1981. She also recorded Erwartung, in 1981.

As a soprano, Susan Davenny Wyner had an international career, performing as a soprano soloist with the Boston Symphony Orchestra, Cleveland Orchestra, Israel Philharmonic Orchestra, London Symphony Orchestra, Metropolitan Opera, New York City Opera, New York Philharmonic, Los Angeles Philharmonic, and many others. She obtained regular engagements with notable conductors such as Leonard Bernstein, Sir Colin Davis, Erich Leinsdorf, André Previn, Lorin Maazel, Seiji Ozawa, Robert Shaw, and Michael Tilson Thomas. She was a successful as a performer of music in both historic and modern vernaculars. She regularly premiered works written especially for her, some of which were recorded for Columbia Masterworks, Angel Records/EMI, Composers Recordings, Inc. (Erwartung) and Musical Heritage Society. In April 1983, her career as a soprano was ended by an automobile/bicycling accident that damaged her vocal cords.

=== Career as a conductor ===
Following her accident, she studied conducting, leading to a subsequent career for which she has received critical acclaim. Davenny-Wyner studied at Yale and Columbia University and received conducting fellowships for study at the Tanglewood Music Festival, the Aspen Music Festival, and the Los Angeles Philharmonic Institute. Since, she has had conducting positions at the New England Conservatory, at the Cleveland Institute of Music, at Wellesley College and Cornell University, where she had once studied, at Brandeis University. In 1998, she was the assistant conductor at Chicago's Grant Park Music Festival, a position that was created especially for her.

Since 1999 Davenny Wyner has served as the music director and conductor of the Warren Philharmonic Orchestra in Warren, Ohio. She also leads two opera companies as music director and conductor: Opera Western Reserve in Youngstown, Ohio, since its creation in 2004 and the Boston Midsummer Opera since 2007.

== Personal life ==
Susan Davenny Wyner married Yehudi Wyner (a composer, pianist, conductor, and music educator) in 1967.
