= University of Chicago Contemporary Chamber Players =

The University of Chicago Contemporary Chamber Players (also called Contempo, CCP, or Contemporary Chamber Players of the University of Chicago) is an American ensemble dedicated to the performance of contemporary classical music. It was founded in Chicago in 1964 by the American composer Ralph Shapey. Its artistic director is the composer Shulamit Ran.

The ensemble has presented the world premieres of over 80 compositions, by composers including Roger Sessions, John Harbison, Ralph Shapey, George Perle, Shulamit Ran, and John Eaton.

In October 2004 the group announced that, in recognition of its 40th anniversary, it would henceforth be known as "Contempo."
