= Pulitzer Prize for Music =

American award for musical works

The Pulitzer Prize for Music is one of seven Pulitzer Prizes awarded annually in Letters, Drama, and Music. It was first given in 1943. Joseph Pulitzer arranged for a music scholarship to be awarded each year, and this was eventually converted into a prize: "For a distinguished musical composition of significant dimension by an American that has had its first performance in the United States during the year."

Because of the requirement that the composition have its world premiere during the year of its award, the winning work had rarely been recorded and sometimes had received only one performance. In 2004, the terms were modified to read: "For a distinguished musical composition by an American that has had its first performance or recording in the United States during the year."

== History ==
In his will, dated April 16, 1904, Joseph Pulitzer established annual prizes for a number of creative accomplishments by living Americans, including prizes for journalism, novels, plays, histories and biographies, but did not establish a prize in music, choosing instead to inaugurate an annual scholarship for "the student of music in America whom the Advisory Board shall deem the most talented and deserving, in order that he may continue his studies with the advantage of European instruction." The Pulitzer Prize for Music was instituted in 1943 to recognize works of "music in its larger forms as composed by an American." The phrase "music in its larger forms" proved difficult to interpret for the advisory board and the prize's juries, resulting in controversies over the years. One critic of the award said, "The Prize Board could hardly have chosen more offensive words to communicate its message."

In 1965, the jury unanimously decided that no major work was worthy of the Pulitzer Prize. It recommended a special citation be given to Duke Ellington in recognition of his body of work, but the Pulitzer Board refused, and so no award was given. Ellington sardonically responded: "Fate is being kind to me. Fate doesn't want me to be too famous too young." Critic Nat Hentoff reported that when he spoke to Ellington about the subject, he was "angrier than I'd ever seen him before" and that Ellington had said, "I'm hardly surprised that my kind of music is still without, let us say, official honor at home. Most Americans still take it for granted that European-based music—classical music, if you will—is the only really respectable kind."

In 1996, the Pulitzer Board announced a change in the criteria for the music prize "so as to attract the best of a wider range of American music." African-American composer and trumpeter Wynton Marsalis became the first jazz artist to win the Pulitzer Prize in 1997; the legitimacy of his win was debated, as his entry, Blood on the Fields, should not have been eligible according to the Pulitzer guidelines: winning works are required to have had their first performance during the year of the award, but Marsalis's piece premiered on April 1, 1994, and Columbia Records released its recording in 1995. In an attempt to bypass that requirement, Marsalis's management had submitted a "revised version" of Blood on the Fields that had seven minor changes and a "premiere" at Yale University. When asked, the chair of that year's jury, composer Robert Ward, said that revisions should have changed "the whole conception of the piece" to make a revised work newly eligible for the prize; after reading a list of the revisions to Blood on the Fields, Ward acknowledged that it should not have been eligible.

Eleven women have received the Pulitzer Prize for Music: Ellen Taaffe Zwilich in 1983; Shulamit Ran in 1991; Melinda Wagner in 1999; Jennifer Higdon in 2010; Caroline Shaw in 2013; Julia Wolfe in 2015; Du Yun in 2017; Ellen Reid in 2019; Tania León in 2021; Rhiannon Giddens in 2023; and Gabriela Lena Frank in 2026. Zwilich was also the first woman to receive a Doctor of Musical Arts degree in composition at the Juilliard School of Music. Du is the first woman of color to receive the award. George Walker was the first African-American to win the Prize, for his work Lilacs in 1996.

In 1992, the jury (which that year consisted of George Perle, Roger Reynolds, and Harvey Sollberger) chose Ralph Shapey's Concerto Fantastique for the award. The Pulitzer Board rejected that decision and gave the prize to the jury's second choice, Wayne Peterson's The Face of the Night, the Heart of the Dark. The jury responded with a public statement that they had not been consulted in that decision and that the Board was not professionally qualified to make such a decision. The Board responded, "Pulitzers are enhanced by having, in addition to the professional's point of view, the layman's or consumer's point of view" and did not rescind its decision.

In 2004, Sig Gissler, the administrator of the Pulitzer Prizes at the Columbia University School of Journalism, announced that the board wanted to "broaden the prize a bit so that we can be more assured that we are getting the full range of the best of America's music". Board member Jay T. Harris said, "The prize should not be reserved essentially for music that comes out of the European classical tradition." The announced rule changes included altering the jury pool to include performers and presenters in addition to composers and critics. Entrants are no longer required to submit a score; though scores are "strongly urged", recordings are also accepted. Gissler said, "The main thing is we're trying to keep this a serious prize. We're not trying to dumb it down any way shape or form, but we're trying to augment it, improve it...I think the critical term here is 'distinguished American musical compositions.'" Reaction among Pulitzer Prize in Music winners has varied.

The Pulitzer Prize Advisory Board officially announced: "After more than a year of studying the Prize, now in its 61st year, the Pulitzer Prize Board declares its strong desire to consider and honor the full range of distinguished American musical compositions—from the contemporary classical symphony to jazz, opera, choral, musical theater, movie scores and other forms of musical excellence...Through the years, the Prize has been awarded chiefly to composers of classical music and, quite properly, that has been of large importance to the arts community. However, despite some past efforts to broaden the competition, only once has the Prize gone to a jazz composition, a musical drama or a movie score. In the late 1990s, the Board took tacit note of the criticism leveled at its predecessors for failure to cite two of the country's foremost jazz composers. It bestowed a Special Citation on George Gershwin marking the 1998 centennial celebration of his birth and Duke Ellington on his 1999 centennial year. Earlier, in 1976, a Special Award was made to Scott Joplin in the American Bicentennial year. While Special Awards and Citations continue to be an important option, the Pulitzer Board believes that the Music Prize, in its own annual competition, should encompass the nation's array of distinguished music and hopes that the refinements in the Prize's definition, guidelines and jury membership will serve that end."

In 2006, a posthumous "Special Citation" was given to Thelonious Monk, and in 2007 the prize went to Ornette Coleman for his live album Sound Grammar; this was the first time a recording won the Pulitzer, and a first for purely improvised music.

In 2018, hip-hop emcee Kendrick Lamar won the award for his 2017 album Damn. This was the first musical work not in the jazz or classical genre to win the prize.

== Criticism ==
In 2004, Donald Martino, the 1974 winner, said of the prize, "If you write music long enough, sooner or later, someone is going to take pity on you and give you the damn thing. It is not always the award for the best piece of the year; it has gone to whoever hasn't gotten it before."

John Corigliano, the 2001 winner, said that the prize had become administered "by composers for composers" and "mired in a pool of rotating jurors."

Composer and critic Kyle Gann complained in his essay "The Uptown Prejudice Against Downtown Music" that the judges for the Pulitzer and other top awards for composition often included "the same seven names over and over": Gunther Schuller, Joseph Schwantner, Jacob Druckman, George Perle, John Harbison, Mario Davidovsky, and Bernard Rands. Gann argued that "Downtown" composers like himself did not win awards because the composer-judges were all "white men, all of them coming pretty much from the same narrow Eurocentric aesthetic.... These seven men have determined who wins the big prizes in American music for the last two decades. They have made sure that Downtown composers never win." After winning the Pulitzer in 2003, John Adams expressed "ambivalence bordering on contempt" at the award, which he felt had ignored "most of the country's greatest musical minds" in favor of academic music.

Schuller welcomed the broadening of the eligibility criteria for the prize in 2004: "This is a long overdue sea change in the whole attitude as to what can be considered for the prize. It is an opening up to different styles and not at all to different levels of quality." Composer Olly Wilson agreed that the changes were "a move in the right direction" because they acknowledge "a wider spectrum of music, including music that is not written down." Some other former prize winners disagreed; Harbison called it "a horrible development", adding, "If you were to impose a comparable standard on fiction you would be soliciting entries from the authors of airport novels." According to Martino, the prize had "already begun to go in the direction of permitting less serious stuff" before the 2004 changes. Lewis Spratlan, who won the prize in 2000, also objected: "The Pulitzer is one of the very few prizes that award artistic distinction in front-edge, risk-taking music. To dilute this objective by inviting the likes of musicals and movie scores, no matter how excellent, is to undermine the distinctiveness and capability for artistic advancement."

In 2018, 1970 winner Charles Wuorinen denounced the jury's decision to grant the award to Kendrick Lamar, saying this constituted "the final disappearance of any societal interest in high culture".

== Winners ==
In its first 84 years, the Music Pulitzer was awarded 80 times; it was never split, and no prize was given in 1953, 1964, 1965, or 1981.

=== 1940s ===
- 1943: William Schuman, Secular Cantata No. 2: A Free Song
- 1944: Howard Hanson, Symphony No. 4, Requiem
- 1945: Aaron Copland, Appalachian Spring, ballet
- 1946: Leo Sowerby, The Canticle of the Sun
- 1947: Charles Ives, Symphony No. 3
- 1948: Walter Piston, Symphony No. 3
- 1949: Virgil Thomson, Louisiana Story, film score

=== 1950s ===
- 1950: Gian Carlo Menotti, The Consul, opera
- 1951: Douglas Stuart Moore, Giants in the Earth, opera
- 1952: Gail Kubik, Symphony Concertante
- 1953: no prize awarded
- 1954: Quincy Porter, Concerto Concertante for two pianos and orchestra
- 1955: Gian Carlo Menotti, The Saint of Bleecker Street, opera
- 1956: Ernst Toch, Symphony No. 3
- 1957: Norman Dello Joio, Meditations on Ecclesiastes
- 1958: Samuel Barber, Vanessa, opera
- 1959: John La Montaine, Piano Concerto No. 1, Op. 9.

=== 1960s ===
- 1960: Elliott Carter, String Quartet No. 2
- 1961: Walter Piston, Symphony No. 7
- 1962: Robert Ward, The Crucible, opera
- 1963: Samuel Barber, Piano Concerto
- 1964: no prize awarded
- 1965: no prize awarded
- 1966: Leslie Bassett, Variations for Orchestra
- 1967: Leon Kirchner, Quartet No. 3 for strings and electronic tape
- 1968: George Crumb, Echoes of Time and the River
- 1969: Karel Husa, String Quartet No. 3

=== 1970s ===
- 1970: Charles Wuorinen, Time's Encomium for electronic tape
- 1971: Mario Davidovsky, Synchronisms No. 6 for Piano and Electronic Sound (1970)
- 1972: Jacob Druckman, Windows
- 1973: Elliott Carter, String Quartet No. 3
- 1974: Donald Martino, Notturno
- 1975: Dominick Argento, From the Diary of Virginia Woolf
- 1976: Ned Rorem, Air Music
- 1977: Richard Wernick, Visions of Terror and Wonder
- 1978: Michael Colgrass, Deja Vu for percussion and orchestra
- 1979: Joseph Schwantner, Aftertones of Infinity

=== 1980s ===
Indented entries are finalists after each year's winner.

- 1980: David Del Tredici, In Memory of a Summer Day
  - Morton Subotnick, After the Butterfly
  - Lukas Foss, Quintets for Orchestra
- 1981: no prize awarded
- 1982: Roger Sessions, Concerto for Orchestra
- 1983: Ellen Zwilich, Three Movements for Orchestra (Symphony No. 1)
  - Vivian Fine, Drama for Orchestra
- 1984: Bernard Rands, Canti del Sole
  - Peter Lieberson, Piano Concerto,
- 1985: Stephen Albert, Symphony No. 1 RiverRun
  - William Bolcom, Songs of Innocence and Experience, a Musical Illumination of the Poems of William Blake
- 1986: George Perle, Wind Quintet No. 4
  - George Rochberg, Symphony No. 5
- 1987: John Harbison, The Flight into Egypt
  - Stephen Albert, Flower of the Mountain
- 1988: William Bolcom, 12 New Etudes for Piano
  - Gunther Schuller, Concerto For String Quartet and Orchestra
- 1989: Roger Reynolds, Whispers Out of Time
  - Steven Stucky, Concerto for Orchestra
  - Bright Sheng, H'un (Lacerations): In Memoriam 1966–1976

=== 1990s ===
- 1990: Mel D. Powell, Duplicates: A Concerto
  - Ralph Shapey, Concerto for Cello, Piano, and String Orchestra
- 1991: Shulamit Ran, Symphony
  - Bright Sheng, Four Movements for Piano
  - Charles Fussell, Wilde
- 1992: Wayne Peterson, The Face of the Night, the Heart of the Dark
  - Ralph Shapey, Concerto Fantastique
- 1993: Christopher Rouse, Trombone Concerto
  - Leon Kirchner, Music for Cello and Orchestra
  - Joan Tower, Violin Concerto
- 1994: Gunther Schuller, Of Reminiscences and Reflections
  - Aaron Jay Kernis, Still Movement with Hymn
  - Charles Wuorinen, Microsymphony
- 1995: Morton Gould, Stringmusic
  - Donald Erb, Evensong
  - Andrew Imbrie, Adam
- 1996: George Walker, Lilacs, for soprano and orchestra
  - Peter Lieberson, Variations for Violin and Piano
  - Elliott Carter, Adagio tenebroso
- 1997: Wynton Marsalis, Blood on the Fields, oratorio
  - John Musto, Dove Sta Amore
  - Stanisław Skrowaczewski, Passacaglia Immaginaria
- 1998: Aaron Jay Kernis, String Quartet No. 2, Musica Instrumentalis
  - John Adams, Century Rolls
  - Yehudi Wyner, Horntrio
- 1999: Melinda Wagner, Concerto for Flute, Strings, and Percussion
  - David Rakowski, Persistent Memory
  - Stanisław Skrowaczewski, Concerto for Orchestra

=== 2000s ===
- 2000: Lewis Spratlan, Life Is a Dream, opera (awarded for concert version of Act II)
  - Donald Martino: Serenata Concertante
  - John Zorn: contes de fees
- 2001: John Corigliano, Symphony No. 2, for string orchestra
  - Stephen Hartke, Tituli
  - Fred Lerdahl, Time After Time
- 2002: Henry Brant, Ice Field
  - Peter Lieberson, Rilke Songs
  - David Rakowski, Ten of a Kind
- 2003: John Adams, On the Transmigration of Souls
  - Steve Reich: Three Tales
  - Paul Schoenfield: Camp Songs
- 2004: Paul Moravec, Tempest Fantasy
  - Steve Reich: Cello Counterpoint
  - Peter Lieberson: Piano Concerto No. 3
- 2005: Steven Stucky, Second Concerto for Orchestra
  - Steve Reich: You Are (Variations)
  - Elliott Carter: Dialogues
- 2006: Yehudi Wyner, Chiavi in Mano (piano concerto)
  - Peter Lieberson: Neruda Songs
  - Chen Yi: Si Ji (Four Seasons)
- 2007: Ornette Coleman, Sound Grammar
  - Elliot Goldenthal: Grendel
  - Augusta Read Thomas: Astral Canticle
- 2008: David Lang, The Little Match Girl Passion
  - Stephen Hartke: Meanwhile
  - Roberto Sierra: Concerto for Viola
- 2009: Steve Reich, Double Sextet
  - Don Byron: 7 Etudes for Solo Piano
  - Harold Meltzer: Brion

=== 2010s ===
- 2010: Jennifer Higdon, Violin Concerto
  - Fred Lerdahl: String Quartet No. 3
  - Julia Wolfe: Steel Hammer
- 2011: Zhou Long, Madame White Snake, opera
  - Fred Lerdahl: Arches
  - Ricardo Zohn-Muldoon: Comala
- 2012: Kevin Puts, Silent Night: Opera in Two Acts
  - Tod Machover: Death and the Powers
  - Andrew Norman: The Companion Guide to Rome
- 2013: Caroline Shaw, Partita for 8 Voices
  - Aaron Jay Kernis: Pieces of Winter Sky
  - Wadada Leo Smith: Ten Freedom Summers
- 2014: John Luther Adams, Become Ocean
  - John Adams: The Gospel According to the Other Mary
  - Christopher Cerrone: Invisible Cities
- 2015: Julia Wolfe, Anthracite Fields
  - Lei Liang: Xiaoxiang
  - John Zorn: The Aristos
- 2016: Henry Threadgill, In for a Penny, In for a Pound
  - Timo Andres: The Blind Banister
  - Carter Pann: The Mechanics: Six from the Shop Floor
- 2017: Du Yun, Angel's Bone, opera
  - Ashley Fure: Bound to the Bow
  - Kate Soper: Ipsa Dixit
- 2018: Kendrick Lamar, Damn, album
  - Michael Gilbertson: Quartet
  - Ted Hearne: Sound from the Bench
- 2019: Ellen Reid, Prism, opera
  - James Romig, Still
  - Andrew Norman, Sustain

=== 2020s ===
- 2020: Anthony Davis, The Central Park Five, opera
  - Alex Weiser, and all the days were purple
  - Michael Torke, Sky: Concerto for Violin
- 2021: Tania León, Stride
  - Maria Schneider, Data Lords
  - Ted Hearne, Place
- 2022: Raven Chacon, Voiceless Mass
  - Leilehua Lanzilotti, with eyes the color of time
  - Andy Akiho, Seven Pillars
- 2023: Rhiannon Giddens and Michael Abels, Omar
  - Tyshawn Sorey, Monochromatic Light (Afterlife)
  - Jerrilynn Patton, Perspective
- 2024: Tyshawn Sorey, Adagio (for Wadada Leo Smith)
  - Felipe Lara, Double Concerto for esperanza spalding, Claire Chase, and large orchestra
  - Mary Kouyoumdjian, Paper Pianos
- 2025: Susie Ibarra, Sky Islands
  - George E. Lewis, The Comet
  - Jalalu-Kalvert Nelson, Jim Is Still Crowing
- 2026: Gabriela Lena Frank, Picaflor: A Future Myth
  - Billy Childs, In the Arms of the Beloved
  - Andrew Rindfleisch, American Descent

=== Additional citations ===
- 1974: Roger Sessions (1896–1985)
- 1976: Scott Joplin (1868–1917, posthumous)
- 1982: Milton Babbitt (1916–2011)
- 1985: William Schuman (1910–1992)
- 1998: George Gershwin (1898–1937, posthumous)
- 1999: Duke Ellington (1899–1974, posthumous)
- 2006: Thelonious Monk (1917–1982, posthumous)
- 2007: John Coltrane (1926–1967, posthumous)
- 2008: Bob Dylan (born 1941)
- 2010: Hank Williams (1923–1953, posthumous)
- 2019: Aretha Franklin (1942–2018, posthumous)

== Repeat winners and finalists ==
Four people have won the Pulitzer Prize for Music twice:

- Walter Piston, 1948, 1961
- Gian Carlo Menotti, 1950, 1955
- Samuel Barber, 1958 (libretto by Menotti), 1963
- Elliott Carter, 1960, 1973

Several people have been named a finalist for the same category more than once:

- Charles Wuorinen, 1970, 1994
- John Zorn, 2000, 2015
- Fred Lerdahl, 2001, 2010, 2011
- Andrew Norman, 2012, 2019
- Ted Hearne, 2018, 2021
