= Yehudi Wyner =

American classical composer

- Born: June 1, 1929 (age 97); Calgary, Alberta, Canada
- Education: Juilliard School; Yale University; Harvard University
- Spouse: Susan Davenny-Wyner
- Relatives: Lazar Weiner (father)
- Awards: Pulitzer Prize for Music (2006)

Yehudi Wyner (born June 1, 1929, in Calgary, Alberta) is an American composer, pianist, conductor, and music educator.

== Life and career ==
Wyner, who grew up in New York City, was raised in a musical family. His father, Lazar Weiner, was an eminent composer of Yiddish art songs. Wyner attended Juilliard, Yale, and Harvard, and was a student of Paul Hindemith and Walter Piston. He has written music in a variety of genres, including compositions for orchestra, chamber ensembles, solo voice, and solo instruments, as well as theatrical music and settings of the Jewish liturgy. Among his best-known works are Friday Evening Service (1963), "Torah Service with Instruments" (1966) for cantor and chorus, and On This Most Voluptuous Night (1982) for soprano and chamber ensemble.

Wyner taught for 14 years at Yale, where he was the head of the composition faculty. He also taught at SUNY Purchase, Cornell, Brandeis, and Harvard.

In 2006, Wyner won the Pulitzer Prize for Music for his piano concerto Chiavi in Mano.

== Personal life ==
From 1951 to 1966 Wyner was married to Nancy Braverman (Wyner), with whom he had three children. He married soprano Susan Davenny-Wyner in 1967.

He graduated from Yale University and Harvard University.

== Selected works ==
- Partita for piano (1952)
- Concert duo for violin and piano (1956)
- Serenade for flute, horn, trumpet, trombone, viola, cello, piano (1958)
- Torah Service with Instruments (1966)
- The Mirror (1972–73)
- Intermedio, lyric ballet for soprano and strings (1974)
- The Grass is High for voice and piano (1979)
- String Quartet (1984–85)
- Composition for viola and piano (1987)
- Trapunto Junction for trumpet, French horn, trombone, and percussion
- Amadeus' billiard: for violin, viola, bass, bassoon, and two horns (cf. Mozart—Divertimento no. 7, K. 205) (1991)
- Prologue and narrative for cello and orchestra (1994)
- Horntrio (1997)
- The second madrigal for women's voices (1999)
- Quartet for oboe and string trio (1999)
- Commedia: for clarinet in B-flat and piano (2003)
- Chiavi in Mano for piano and orchestra (2004)
- Give Thanks for All Things for orchestra and chorus (2010)
- TRIO 2009 for clarinet, cello and piano (2010)
- Fantasy on B.A.C.H. for piano (2010)
- Fragments from Antiquity for soprano and orchestra (revised 2011)
- The Lord is close to the Heartbroken for chorus, harp, and percussion (2012)
- Concordance for violin, viola, cello, and piano (2012)
- Save me O God; Psalm 49 for chorus a cappella (2012)
- Refrain for solo piano (2012)
- Into the evening air for wind quintet (2013)
- West of the Moon for guitar, mandolin, flute, oboe, violin, and cello (2013)
- Sonnet: In the arms of Sleep for soprano, two mezzo sopranos, flute, clarinet, violin, viola, cello, and harp (2015)
- Duologue for two pianos (2016)
- Hobson Preludes for piano (2016)
- Concertino for piano, flute, clarinet, violin, and cello (2017)
- Maze 2 for orchestra and young string soloists (2018)
- 4x20 for Christoph Wolff for piano (2020)
- O Lord do not forsake me, motet for a cappella voices (2020)
- Concord 7 for flute, oboe, clarinet, violin, viola, cello, and piano (2020, revised 2021)
- Richard Pittman...Come Back! for orchestra (2022)
- Sequel for flute, clarinet, violin, cello, marimba, and piano (2022)
- Draw Onward for piano (2022)
- Cool Runnin' for piano (2023)
- Duo Concertino for viola, piano, and string orchestra (2024)

== Degrees ==
- Yale University, M.Mus. (1953)
- Harvard University, M.A. (1952)
- Yale University, B.Mus. (1951)
- Yale University, B.A. (1950)
- Juilliard School, Diploma (1946)

== Awards ==
- Fellow, American Academy of Arts and Sciences (2008)
- Pulitzer Prize in Music for "Piano Concerto: 'Chiavi in Mano'" (2006)
- Member, American Academy of Arts and Letters (2001–2002)
- Elise L. Stoeger Prize, Chamber Music Society of Lincoln Center "for contributions to chamber music" (1997–1998)
- Finalist, Pulitzer Prize in Music (1997–1998)
- Naumburg Chair in Composition (1991)
- Guggenheim Fellowship (1976–1977)
- National Endowment for the Arts grant (1976)
- Brandeis University Creative Arts Award (1963)
- National Institute of Arts and Letters grant (1961)
- Guggenheim Fellowship (1960)
- A.E. Hertz Fellowship (1953)
- Rome Prize Fellowship (1953–1956)

== Notable students ==
- Chester Biscardi
- Craig Walsh

== Partial discography ==
- YEHUDI WYNER: 'CHIAVI IN MANO,' OTHER WORKS. Robert Levin, pianist; Boston Symphony Orchestra, conducted by Robert Spano; other performers. Bridge 9282; CD, OCLC 1067026313
