= Ralph Shapey =

American composer and conductor

Ralph Shapey (12 March 1921 – 13 June 2002) was an American composer and conductor.

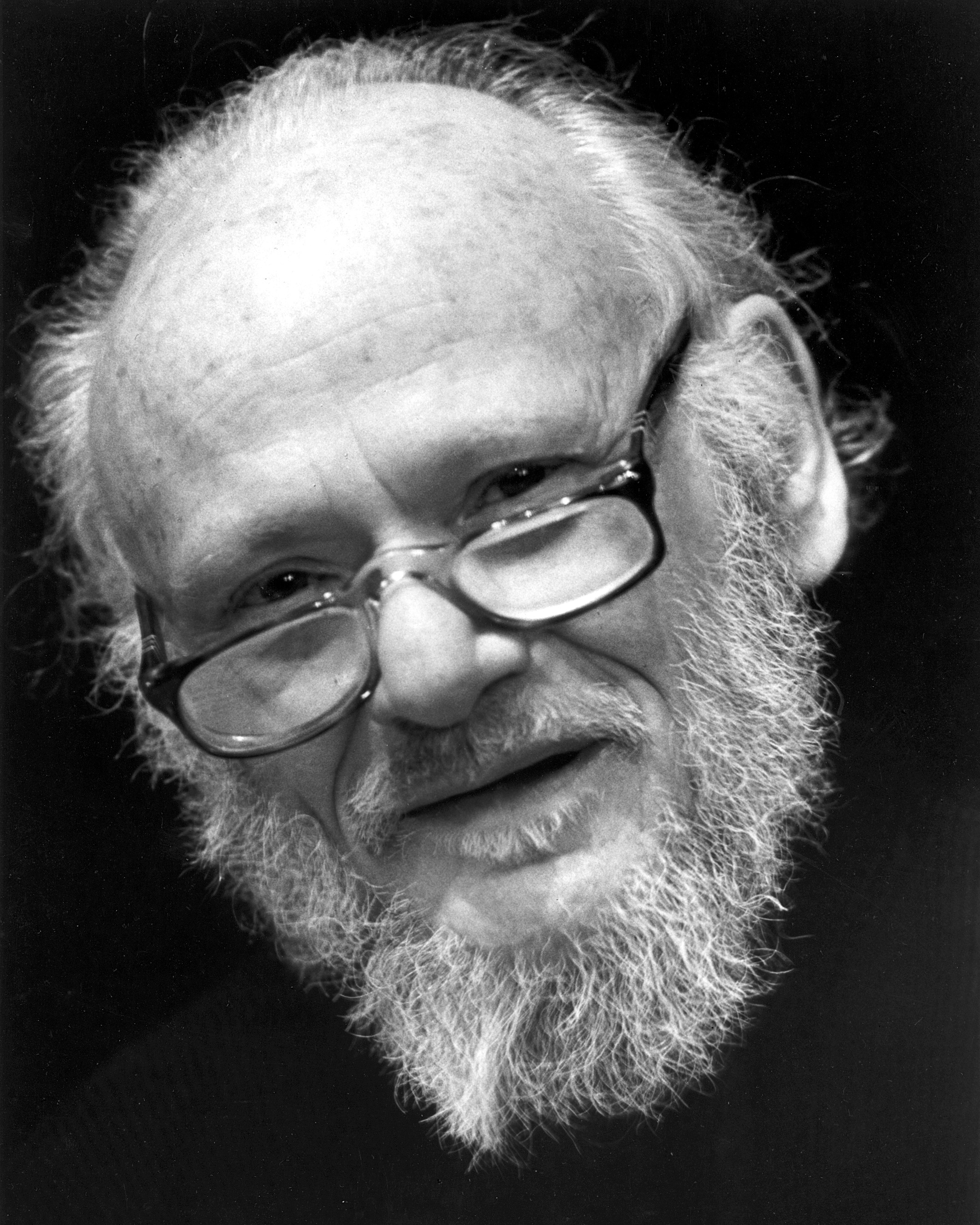
Ralph Shapey

== Biography ==
Shapey was born in Philadelphia, Pennsylvania. He is known for his work as a composition professor at the University of Chicago, where he taught from 1964 to 1991 and where he founded and directed the Contemporary Chamber Players. Shapey studied violin with Emanuel Zeitlin and composition with Stefan Wolpe. He served in the United States Army in World War II before moving to New York City, where he worked as a violinist, composer, conductor, and pedagogue. In 1963, he conducted the orchestra and chorus at the University of Pennsylvania before accepting his position in Chicago.

Shapey was made a MacArthur Fellow in 1982. Upon hearing the news via a telephone call, he was skeptical, reportedly asking, "Which of my friends or enemies put you up to this?" and slamming down the receiver.

Shapey's style is characterized by modernist angularity, irony, and technical rigor, but his concern for sweeping gesture, frenetic passion, rhythmic vitality, lyrical melody, and dramatic arc recall Romanticism. He was dubbed by the critics Leonard B. Meyer and Bernard Jacobson a "radical traditionalist", which pleased him immensely—he held a deep respect for the masters of the past, whom he regarded as his finest teachers. The musicologist Ronit Seter, and Shapey's student Shulamit Ran, noted a strong connection to Jewish and Israeli music in several of his works.

The French-American composer Edgard Varèse was among Shapey's most important influences. Both composers had a fascination with unusual sonorities, counterpoint masses, and the outer extremes of pitch space. The coordination of static "sound blocks" in Shapey's music is also reminiscent of another French composer, Olivier Messiaen, though Shapey reportedly found Messiaen's music saccharine and maudlin.

Many listeners would call Shapey's music "atonal", but he rejected the label, considering himself a tonal composer. Indeed, his work, though couched in a highly dissonant harmonic idiom rich in interval classes 1 and 6, does adhere to certain organizational features of tonal music, including pitch hierarchy and object permanence. Shapey's music in his late period used a structure called the Mother Lode worksheet, a structure that contained a 12-tone row, melodic, and harmonic elements.

Shapey's Concerto for Cello, Piano, and String Orchestra was a finalist for the 1990 Pulitzer Prize for Music and shared the top Kennedy Center Friedheim Award prize with William Kraft for Veils and Variations for Horn and Orchestra.

In 1992 the Pulitzer Prize for Music jury, which that year consisted of George Perle, Roger Reynolds, and Harvey Sollberger, selected Shapey's Concerto Fantastique for the award. The Pulitzer Board rejected the decision and gave the prize to the jury's second choice, Wayne Peterson's The Face of the Night, the Heart of the Dark. The jury responded with a public statement that they had not been consulted on that decision and that the board was not qualified to make it. The board responded that the "Pulitzers are enhanced by having, in addition to the professional's point of view, the layman's or consumer's point of view", and did not rescind its decision.

Shapey wrote over 200 works, many published by Presser. Presser also offers his textbook A Basic Course in Music Composition, written after over 50 years of teaching the subject. Recordings of Shapey's music are available on the CRI, Opus One, and New World labels. Shapey's works have been catalogued by Patrick D. Finley in A Catalogue of the Works of Ralph Shapey, published by Pendragon Press.

His students include Gerald Levinson, Robert Carl, Gordon Marsh, Michael Eckert, Philip Fried, Matt Malsky, Lawrence Fritts, Richard Blocker, James Anthony Walker, Frank Retzel, Jorge Liderman, Jonathan Elliott, Terry Winter Owens, Deborah Drattell, Ursula Mamlok, Shulamit Ran, and Melinda Wagner. Ran dedicated her Pulitzer Prize-winning Symphony to Shapey in 1990.

The composer Robert Black was particularly influenced by him, and as a conductor he premiered Shapey's Three for Six.

== Sources ==
- Carl, Robert "Radical Traditionalism". Liner notes to Ralph Shapey—Radical Traditionalism. New World Records.
- Finley, Patrick. A Catalogue of the Works of Ralph Shapey. Stuyvesant, New York: Pendragon Press, 1997. Catalogue complete up to 1996. Also contains a biography based on recorded interviews, and a brief analysis of the openings of five of his works with a detailed explanation of his compositional method.
