= Shulamit Ran =

Israeli-American composer (born 1949)

Ran in 1968

Shulamit Ran (Hebrew: שולמית רן; born October 21, 1949, in Tel Aviv, Israel) is an Israeli-American composer. She moved from Israel to New York City at 14, as a scholarship student at the Mannes College of Music. Her Symphony (1990) won her the Pulitzer Prize for Music. She was the second woman to win the Pulitzer Prize for Music, the first being Ellen Taaffe Zwilich in 1983. Ran was a professor of music composition at the University of Chicago from 1973 to 2015. She has performed as a pianist in Israel, Europe and the U.S., and her compositional works have been performed worldwide by a wide array of orchestras and chamber groups.

== Biography ==
=== Early life ===
Born in Israel in 1949, Ran began composing songs to Hebrew poetry at the age of seven. By the age of nine, she was studying composition with some of Israel's top composers, most notably Alexander Boskovich and Paul Ben-Haim. As a child, Jewish cantoral music played on the radio by her father had a huge impact on Ran. This is apparent in her opera Between Two Worlds – The Dybbuk.

She was able to continue her composition studies into her adult years with scholarships from Mannes College of Music in New York and the American Israel Cultural Foundation. In addition to piano, she studied composition with Norman Dello Joio and Ralph Shapey. While in the United States, studied piano with Nadia Reisenberg and Dorothy Taubman. During her time in the US, Shapey and composer Elliott Carter helped shape Ran's compositional voice, which was constantly changing.

=== Academic career ===
After studying with Shapey, he invited Ran to follow in his path of music education. In 1973, at the age of 26, Ran joined the faculty at University of Chicago, where she eventually was named the Andrew MacLeish Distinguished Service Professor in the Department of Music, she also became the artistic director of Contempo (formerly the Contemporary Chamber Players). Ran, whose students included Melinda Wagner, Suzanne Sorkin, Matt Malsky, Jonathan Elliott and Jorge Liderman, retired from her position at the University of Chicago in June 2015. She also became a member of the American Academy of Arts and Letters, and the American Academy of Arts and Sciences.

== About her works ==
=== Commissioned ===
Ran's piece Legends was commissioned for the centennials of the Chicago Symphony Orchestra and University of Chicago.

=== Performed by ===
Ran's works have been performed by many of the world's leading orchestras, including the New York Philharmonic, Israel Philharmonic Orchestra, Chicago Symphony Orchestra, the Philadelphia Orchestra, the Cleveland Orchestra, the Jerusalem Orchestra, the Orchestre de la Suisse Romande, the Amsterdam Philharmonic, the Baltimore Symphony Orchestra, the National Symphony Orchestra, the Orchestra of St. Luke's, and the American Composers Orchestra.

Ran's works have also been performed by Contemporary Chamber Players of the University of Chicago, Da Capo Chamber Players, Dolce Suono Ensemble, Network for New Music, the New York New Music Ensemble, the Contemporary Chamber Ensemble, Twentieth Century Consort, Monday Evenin Concerts in Los Angeles, Callisto Ensemble, both Collage and Musica Viva in Boston, the Chicago Symphony Orchestra's MusicNOW, the Pennsylvania Contemporary Players, the Mendelssohn String Quartet, the Lark Quartet the Penderecki Quartet, the Cassatt Quartet, the Peabody Trio, Musical Elements, San Francisco Contemporary Music Players, and Chamber Music Society of Lincoln Center.

Her music has been performed worldwide, in such places as the Library of Congress, the Kennedy Center, on "Music Today" in New York, and at the Tanglewood, Aspen, Santa Fe, and Yellow Barn summer festivals.

== Works ==
=== Chamber ensemble ===
- A Prayer (1981) – horn, clarinet, bass clarinet, bassoon, and timpani
- Bach-Shards (2002) – string quartet
- Chicago Skyline (1991) – brass and percussion
- Concerto da Camera I (1985) – woodwind quintet
- Concerto da Camera II (1987) – clarinet, string quartet and piano
- Concerto da Camera III ("Under the Sun's Gaze") (2003–2004)
- Double Vision (1976) – two quintets (woodwinds and brass) and piano
- Excursions (1980) – violin, cello and piano
- Fault Line (2005–2006)
- String Quartet No. 3 – Glitter, Shards, Doom, Memory (2013)
- Invocation (1994) for horn, timpani and chimes
- Lyre of Orpheus (2009) for string sextet with featured cello solo
- Mirage (1990) for five players
- Moon Songs (2011) for voice, flute (doubling piccolo), cello, and piano
- Private Game (1979) for clarinet and cello
- Soliloquy (1997) for violin, cello and piano
- Sonatina (1961) for two flutes
- Song and Dance (2007) duo for saxophones and percussion
- String Quartet No. 1 (1984)
- String Quartet No. 2 – Vistas (1988–89)

=== Instrumental solo ===
- Birds of Paradise (2014) for flute and piano
- East Wind (1987) for flute
- Fantasy Variations (1979, rev. 1984) for solo cello
- For an Actor (1978) monologue for clarinet in A
- Ha'llel (2005) for solo organ
- Hyperbolae (1976) for piano
- Inscriptions (1991) for solo violin
- Piano Sonata No. 2 (no date)
- Quadrophony (2026) for solo marimba
- Short Piano Pieces (no date)
- Sonata Walzer (1983) for piano
- Spirit (2017) for clarinet
- Three Fantasy Pieces (1971) for cello and piano
- Three Scenes (2000) for clarinet
- Verticals (1982) for piano

=== Opera ===
- Between Two Worlds (The Dybbuk), opera in two acts (1997)
- Anne Frank (2023)

=== Orchestra ===
- Concert Piece (1970), for piano and orchestra
- Concerto for Orchestra (1986)
- Legends for orchestra (1992–93, rev. 2001)
- The Show Goes On for clarinet and orchestra (Ha'hatzaga Nimshechet) (2008)
- Symphony (1989–90)
- Vessels of Courage and Hope, for orchestra (1998)
- Violin Concerto (2002–03)
- Voices (2000) for flautist with orchestra
- Yearning (1995) for violin and string orchestra

=== Transcriptions (transcribed by Cliff Colnot) ===
- Fanfare for Brass (1991)
- Soliloquy II (2007) for violin, strings and percussion
- Three Fantasy Movements (1993) for cello and orchestra

=== Vocal and choral ===
- Adonai Malach (Psalm 93) (1985)
- Amichai Songs (1985)
- Apprehensions for voice, clarinet and piano (1979)
- Credo/Ani Ma'amin (2006)
- Ensembles for 17 (1975) for soprano and instrumental ensemble
- Fanfare for multi-tracked sopranos (1981)
- Hatzvi Israel Eulogy (1969) for mezzo-soprano, flute, harp, string quartet
- O The Chimneys (Not Yet Released) for mezzo-soprano and chamber ensemble. "O, The Chimneys" is side 2 of the Vox Turnabout LP TV-S 34492, with Gloria Davy, soprano; Shulamit Ran, piano; New York Philomusica Chamber Ensemble, A. Robert Johnson, conductor.
- Shirim L'Yom Tov (Four Festive Songs) (2003 and 2005) for a cappella choir
- Supplications for chorus and orchestra (no date)

== Achievements ==
Ran's achievements include fellowships and commissions from Martha Baird Rockefeller Fund, Ford Foundation, the National Endowment for the Arts, the Guggenheim Foundation, the Fromm Music Foundation, WFMT, Chamber Music America, the Serge Koussevitzky Music Foundation in the Library of Congress, the American Academy of Arts and Letters, Eastman School of Music, the American Composers Orchestra, the Chamber Music Society of Lincoln Center, the Philadelphia Orchestra, the Chicago Symphony Orchestra, the Baltimore Symphony, and many more.

Ran was named the Chicago Symphony Orchestra's second composer-in-residence and served from 1990 until 1997. Her Symphony, performed in 1990, won her the Pulitzer Prize in 1991 and took first place as the Kennedy Center Friedheim Award. This makes her the second woman to win the Pulitzer Prize in music, the first being Ellen Taaffe Zwilich in 1983. She has received five honorary doctorates, and her works are published by Theodore Presser Company and the Israeli Music Institute. In addition to this, she has been recorded by more than 12 record labels.
