= Symphony (Ran) =

1990 orchestral symphony

- by Shulamit Ran
- Form: Symphony
- Commissioned by: Philadelphia Orchestra
- Performed: 19 October 1990:
- Published: 1990: Theodore Presser Company

The Symphony is a symphony for orchestra by the Israeli-American composer Shulamit Ran. The work was commissioned by the Philadelphia Orchestra under the direction of Riccardo Muti in 1987 and was given its world premiere on October 19, 1990. The piece was awarded the 1991 Pulitzer Prize for Music and took the first place Kennedy Center Friedheim Award that same year. It was composed in a primarily atonal style.
