= Concerto for String Quartet and Orchestra (Schuller) =

Music by American composer Gunther Schuller

The Concerto for String Quartet and Orchestra is a composition for string quartet and orchestra by the American composer Gunther Schuller. The work was composed between 1987 and early 1988. Its world premiere was given on February 20, 1988, by the Pro Arte Quartet and the Madison Symphony Orchestra conducted by Schuller. The piece was a finalist for the 1988 Pulitzer Prize for Music.

== Composition ==
=== Structure ===
The concerto has a duration of roughly 22 minutes and is cast in four movements:

1. Lento misterioso
2. Scherzo – Vivace
3. Quietly flowing
4. Allegro molto

The third and fourth movements are played without interruption.

=== Instrumentation ===
The work is scored for string quartet and a large orchestra consisting of three flutes (doubling piccolo and alto flute), three oboes, cor anglais, two clarinets, bass clarinet, three bassoons (doubling contrabassoon), four horns, four trumpets, three trombones, tuba, percussion, harp, piano, celesta, and strings.

== Reception ==
Travis Rivers of The Spokesman-Review wrote, "Schuller is a master of orchestration and his concerto is filled with ingenious use of evocative sounds—twitterings, murmurings, and stormy outbursts—sounds that can be appreciated for the moods they produce. The work also succeeds in doing some things few composers have even tried to do and none succeeding so well as Schuller—namely, treating the string quartet as a group of soloists, allowing the four players to interact as a quartet and still keeping the group from merging into the orchestral string sections."
