= Symphony No. 1 (Albert) =

Symphony No. 1 RiverRun is an orchestral symphony in four movements by the American composer Stephen Albert. The piece was completed in 1983 and won the Pulitzer Prize for Music in 1985. The title comes from the novel Finnegans Wake by James Joyce, whose literature served as inspiration for the work.

== Composition ==
The symphony has a duration of approximately 33 minutes and is composed in four movements:

1. Rain Music
2. Leafy Speafing
3. Beside the Rivering Waters
4. River's End

== Reception ==
Music critic Steve Schwartz said of the work, "Albert's characteristic mode of musical expression is epic. It takes big breaths and proceeds in long phrases. It is full of 'parody quotes' — that is, things that you can easily trace to another composer but not note-for-note." Schwartz nevertheless opined, "...the symphony doesn't really grab me, although I can certainly see why so many admire it. For me, Albert's strategy of building up layers of activity combined with his penchant for low sonorities yields something one step up from mud." Walter Price of the Los Angeles Times conversely praised the work, saying, "Albert's 1985 Pulitzer Prize winning symphony, inspired by the works of James Joyce, is conservatively tonal, even Romantic. His style is eclectic though clearly the Stravinsky of 'Firebird' and 'Petrushka' have influenced him." Price added, "Albert is certainly a master of lush orchestration, if his melodic material is not particularly distinguished."
