= Harvey Sollberger =

American composer, flutist, and conductor

Harvey Sollberger (born May 11, 1938 in Cedar Rapids, Iowa) is an American composer, flutist, and conductor specializing in contemporary classical music.

== Life ==
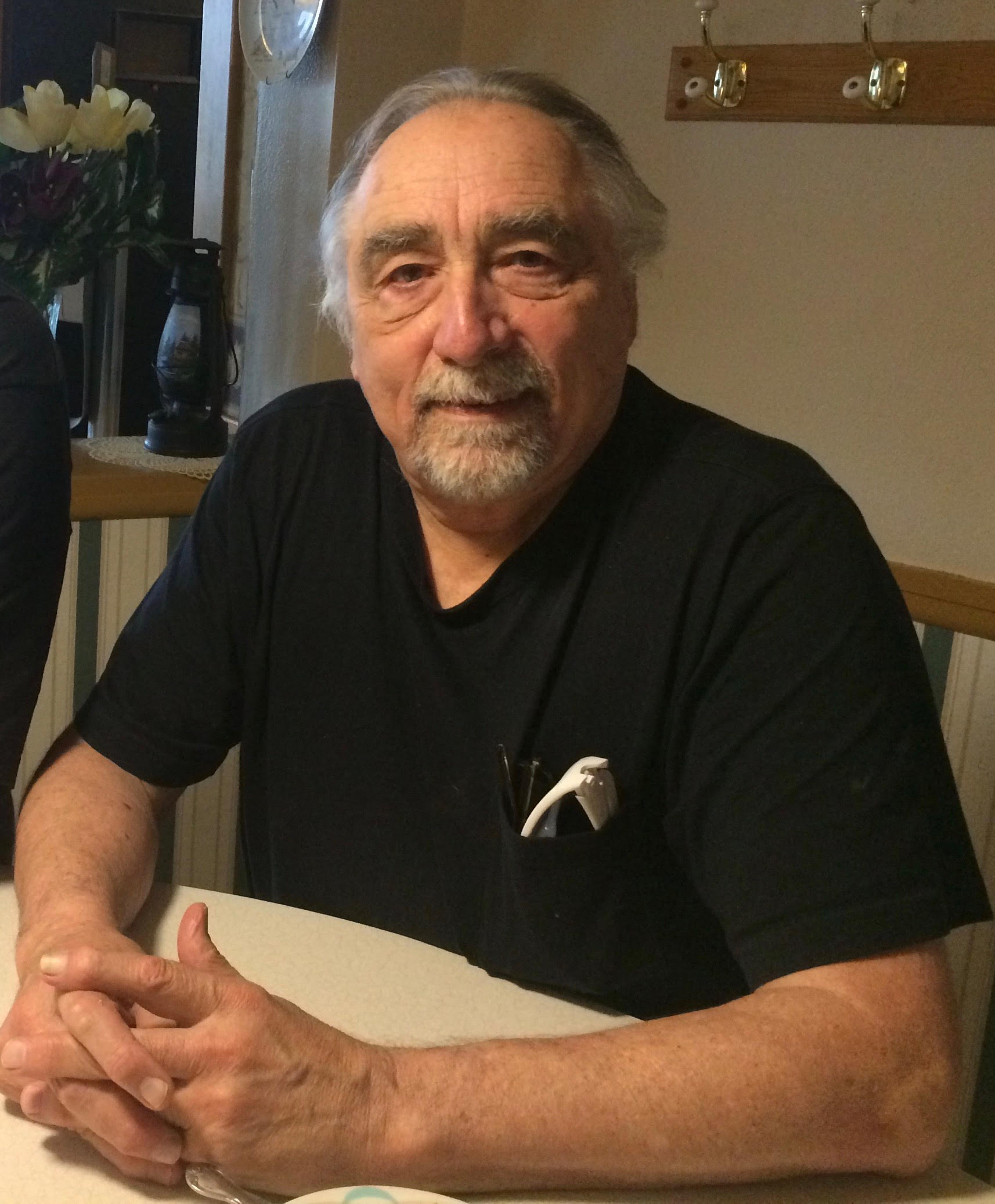
Harvey Sollberger at Franklin Hotel in Strawberry Point, Iowa on May 16, 2017. Photo by Michael Daugherty

Sollberger holds an M.A. degree from Columbia University, where his composition instructors included Jack Beeson and Otto Luening. In 1962 he co-founded (with Charles Wuorinen) The Group for Contemporary Music in New York City, which he directed for 27 years.

He is emeritus professor of music at the University of California, San Diego. He taught at Columbia University, the Manhattan School of Music, and Indiana University. From 1997 to 2005, he served as music director of the La Jolla Symphony and Chorus.

Sollberger has established a distinguished career in composition, earning two Guggenheim Fellowships and an award from the National Institute of Arts and Letters. His work has been commissioned by a wide range of institutions, including the San Francisco Symphony, the National Endowment for the Arts, the Koussevitzky Foundation, and the New York State Council for the Arts.

His music has been released on Composers Recordings, Inc.

He currently lives in Strawberry Point, Iowa.

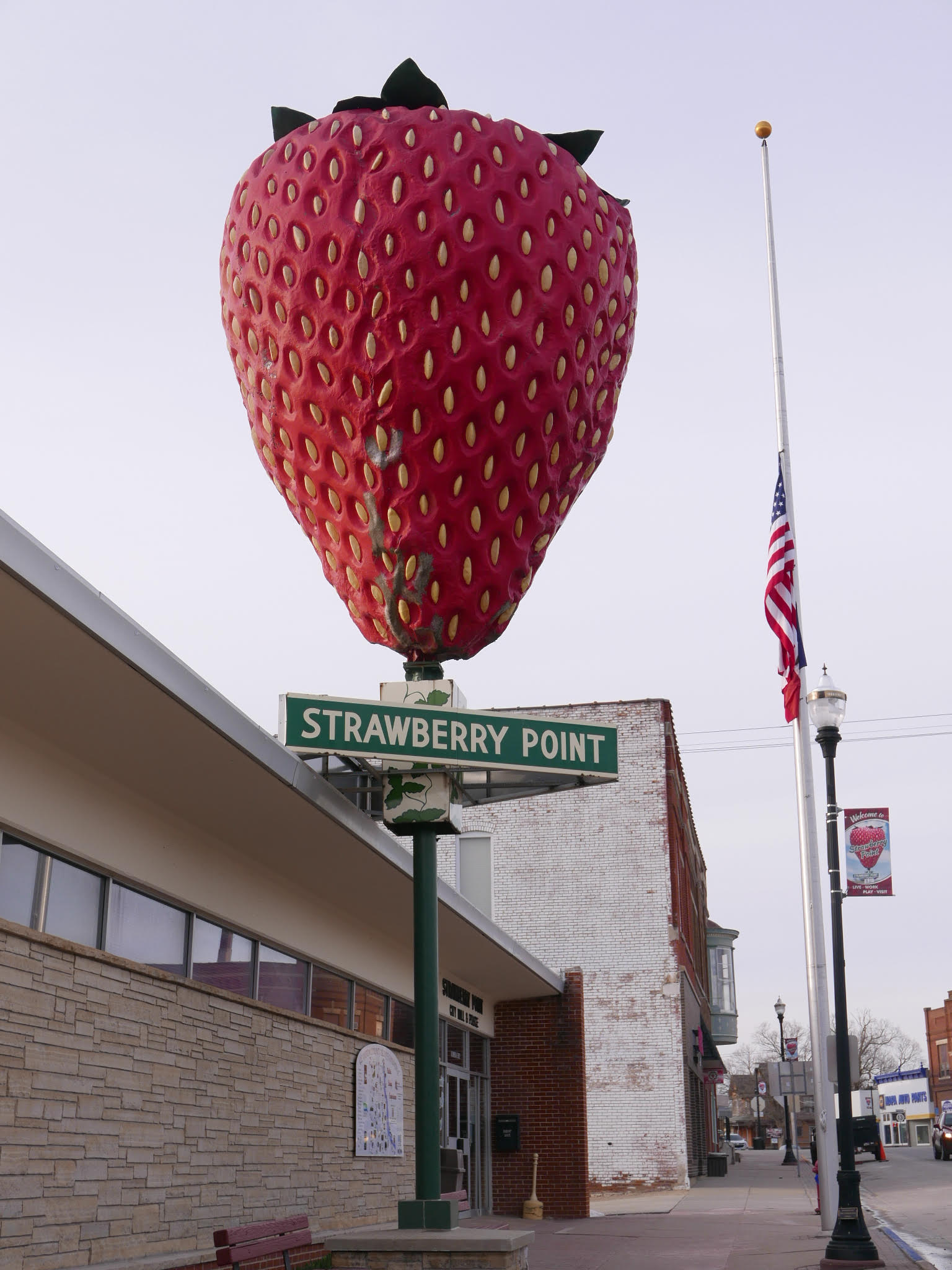
Main Street, Strawberry Point, Iowa. Photo by Michael Daugherty

== Awards ==
- 1969 Guggenheim Fellowship
- Fromm commission
- Koussevitzky commission
- Naumberg Foundations commission
- National Endowment for the Arts
