= Bob Lord (musician) =

- Born: 1976; Andover, Massachusetts, U.S.
- Genres: Progressive rock; Classical; Jazz; Classical & Jazz Fusion; Experimental music
- Occupations: Record producer; Composer; Bassist; Music director
- Years active: 1989–present
- Labels: PARMA Recordings, Comet Records, Red Fez Records, Big Balloon Records
- Award: Musical America "30 Professionals of the Year" (2015)
- Website: www.boblordmusic.com

Bob Lord (born 1976) is an American music producer, composer, bassist, and entrepreneur. He is the co-founder and CEO of PARMA Recordings, a contemporary classical music production house and parent company to label imprints Big Round Records, Navona Records, Ravello Records, MMC Recordings, Ansonica Records, Capstone Records, Albany Records and more recently MSR Classics.

A prolific figure in the recording industry, Lord has more than 1,000 production and recording credits to his name. He has served as Executive Producer for three Grammy Award-winning albums, including the 2023 and 2025 winners for Best Choral Performance. Through the Navona label, he has several production credits on earlier albums, such as The Arc in the Sky, a 2020 Grammy-nomination.

Outside of his work with PARMA, Lord serves as the President of the Zagreb Festival Orchestra, Croatia. More locally, he has been a member of the Advisory Board of the Portsmouth Symphony Orchestra since 2013.

He is also notable for being the bassist/composer of the experimental rock trio Dreadnaught, music director for the NHPR/Music Hall series Writers on a New England Stage, and in-studio producer of Grammy-winning clarinetist Richard Stoltzman.

He has more than 150 credits as a producer, executive producer, performer, arranger, label manager, and composer, and with Pete Townshend of The Who served as co-producer for the double-album release by Lawrence Ball, Method Music.

== Career ==
=== Composer & bassist ===
Lord's musical output spans the rock, classical, jazz, pop, film, and experimental genres, and he has composed, produced, and arranged for a wide cross-section of instrumentation, including orchestra ("James Thresher Industries"), rock band ("The Elevator Chaser"), piano ("Kazak, The Hound Of Space"), string orchestra ("Creepin'"), and electronics ("Agah Eegah"). His music is largely instrumental and generally eschews song format, with some exceptions ("Bony Cleave", "Danny").

As a recording artist, Lord has appeared on over three dozen releases and won numerous awards for his work. Dreadnaught's The American Standard (2001) was one of the best-reviewed progressive rock releases of its year, and the decade-long retrospective High Heat & Chin Music (2007) received a "Best Of NH 2007" award from New Hampshire Magazine. As a bassist he has been noted for his crisp tone (achieved through frequent use of a plectrum) and unusual bass lines.

=== Producer ===
In 2002, while beginning preparations for what would become Dreadnaught's double-disc Live At Mojo (Comet Records), Lord began composing and producing music for film and other media; his work includes music for "Flying Downhill", a documentary on Olympic skier Bode Miller, "Marilyn's Man", a Marilyn Monroe documentary released by Universal, "Wander", an award-winning short film which aired on IFC, and the theme song for "The Exchange" from New Hampshire Public Radio.

Lord began producing for MMC Recordings in 2005 where he worked with Richard Stoltzman, Pixar/Randy Newman orchestrator Jonathan Sacks, and company owner and composer/pianist William Thomas McKinley among others, with credits on more than 30 releases over the next three years and recording with numerous orchestras, composers, ensembles, and players.

In 2008, Lord launched PARMA Recordings, an audio production company, and Navona Records, a classical imprint. In 2009, PARMA acquired the classical label Capstone Records and Big Round Records (previously owned by Congressman Paul Hodes), and launched Ravello Records, an imprint dedicated to modern classical music. In 2011, PARMA acquired MMC Recordings and the boutique online publisher ThatNewMusicWebsite/ThatNewMusicLibrary.

PARMA's releases include work by Pulitzer Prize winners Lewis Spratlan and Donald Martino, New York Philharmonic concertmaster Glenn Dicterow, former Congressman and Orleans founder John Hall, percussionist Steve Gadd, the London Symphony Orchestra, children's artist Raffi, and jazz bassist Eddie Gómez, violin and guitar ensemble Duo46 (music of John Carollo) among others.

In 2011, Lord served as co-producer with Pete Townshend of The Who for Lawrence Ball's Method Music, released in January 2012 on Navona Records. The album is a continuation of the concepts first explored in Townshend's Lifehouse project and Lifehouse Method website.

=== Performances ===
Since its formation in 1996, Lord's primary performance vehicle has been Dreadnaught. The band began touring nationally in 2000 as a trio, performed in more than half of the U.S. states, and earned a reputation as a highly accomplished musical unit equally proficient in highly structured compositions and free-wheeling improvisation.

With Dreadnaught, Lord has shared a stage with John Entwistle (The Who), Tony Levin (Peter Gabriel, King Crimson), NRBQ, Jim Weider (The Band), California Guitar Trio, and the Young Dubliners. In 2005, the group began a prominent stint as house band for the New Hampshire Public Radio series Writers on a New England Stage at the Music Hall in Portsmouth, where it has performed with Stephen King, Dan Brown, Ken Burns, Alan Alda, John Updike, Elmore Leonard, Madeleine Albright, and Mitch Albom, among others. The series has attracted international coverage and has been featured in press outlets such as The Today Show and Good Morning America.

In 2011, Lord served as on-air host for the NHPR/Music Hall live radio series Live@TheLoft, which featured the artists Buffalo Tom, Stew (musician) & The Negro Problem, Frazey Ford, and Patty Larkin.

== Credits ==
=== Executive Producer/Producer (Partial List) ===
Album Title	Artist	Year	Label	Notes
Method Music	Lawrence Ball	2011	Navona Records	Produced by Pete Townshend and Bob Lord
I Told You So	John Hall	2011	Big Round Records	Anti-nuclear single by Orleans founder
Divergence	Various Artists	2011	Navona Records	String concerti featuring the Warsaw National Philharmonic
Viola Tango Rock	Orquesta Filarmonica de Bogotá	2011	Big Round Records	Live DVD
Excursions	Marie Nelson Bennett	2010	Ravello Records	Music by student of Paul Hindemith
Continuum	Various Artists	2010	Navona Records	Featuring Seattle Symphony Orchestra
Mika Marimba Madness	Mika Yoshida	2010	Big Round Records	Live DVD with Steve Gadd & Eddie Gómez
From Bow To String	K. Dreyfus & G. Dicterow	2009	Navona Records	Concertos featuring New York Philharmonic concertmaster
Big Muddy Suite	Patrick Beckman	2009	Navona Records	Jazz/Blues/Classical piano duet featuring Richard Stoltzman
In Memoriam	Lewis Spratlan	2009	Navona Records	Premiere recordings from Pulitzer Prize-winner
5th (S)eason	Jonathan Sacks	2008	Navona Records	First solo CD by orchestrator for Randy Newman and Pixar
Phoenix In Flight	Richard Stoltzman	2008	Navona Records	Orchestral classical works by 2-time Grammy-winner
New American Works For Clarinet Vol. 2	Richard Stoltzman	2008	MMC Recordings	Featuring works by William Thomas McKinley
About Lear And Others	William Stalnaker	2008	MMC Recordings	Featuring Gerard Schwarz and Seattle Symphony Orchestra
Musicscapes	Various Artists	2008	MMC Recordings	With orchestral version of Dreadnaught's "James Thresher Industries"
Painted Shadows Of Childhood	Donald Betts	2007	MMC Recordings	Featuring Richard Stoltzman
High Heat & Chin Music	Dreadnaught	2007	Big Balloon/Red Fez Records	2CD compilation
Live At Mojo	Dreadnaught	2005	Comet Records	2CD live in the studio
Musica En Flagrante	Dreadnaught	2004	Big Balloon	Studio recordings
Apples & Oranges	Various Artists	2004	Red Fez Records	Featuring Dreadnaught, Ed Jurdi, Thanks To Gravity, Duncan Watt
The American Standard	Dreadnaught	2001	Red Fez Records	Studio recordings
Una Vez Mas	Dreadnaught	2000	self-released	Studio recordings
Dreadnaught	Dreadnaught	1998	self-released	Studio recordings

=== Product/Marketing/Imprint Credits (Partial List) ===
Album Title	Artist	Year	Label	Notes
And The President Said	Various Artists	2006	MMC Recordings	Featuring The Washington Post Editor Ben Bradlee
Concordia Chamber Ensemble	Various Artists	2006	MMC Recordings	Featuring Baltimore Symphony Orchestra conductor Marin Alsop
Xtreme Classical	A. Paul Johnson	2006	MMC Recordings	Featuring JJ Grey and MOFRO
Royal Liverpool Philharmonic	Various Artists	2006	MMC Recordings	Featuring Gerard Schwarz
Jazz For Two	Duehlmeier/Gritton Duo	2005	MMC Recordings	Piano duo w/orchestra featuring music by George Gershwin
Music For Orchestra	Lee Actor	2005	MMC Recordings	Orchestral music
Works For Double Bass	Richard Fredrickson	2005	MMC Recordings	Orchestral works for bass
Fear Of Heights	Mr. Vertigo	2005	Red Fez Records	Studio recordings
Oblique Music For Soundtracks That Don't Exist	Museum Of Science	2005	Red Fez Records	Studio recordings
4th Of July	Tractor Trailer	2005	Red Fez Records	Studio recordings
Longshores Drive	Ed Jurdi	2004	Red Fez Records	Studio recordings

=== Composition/Production/Music Supervision For Media ===
Selected List

Project Title	Company	Year	Notes
The Exchange	NHPR	2007	Theme song for news radio program
Going Mobile	Hot Diggity / Innov-X	2007	Re-record of Who song for ad campaign
Wander	Wander Films	2006	Original score and sound for award-winning short film
Touch Of Heaven	OxRock Productions	2006	Original score for documentary
White Contrast	Premier Snowskate	2005	Music supervision for DVD line
Marilyn's Man	Universal	2005	Produced/performed re-record of Dean Martin's "Sway"
Flying Downhill	Coruway Film Institute	2005	Original music for Bode Miller documentary
Blue Hive	Sweet & Doggett	2005	Music branding for marketing campaign
Hineini	Keshet	2005	Music supervision for award-winning documentary
Barber Farm	MediaShower Productions	2005	Score for documentary by About.com's Gretchen Siegchrist
That Old Silent Film	OxRock Productions	2005	Producer of award-winning score for short film

=== Music Director For Writers On A New England Stage (2005–present) ===
Author	Year	Pieces Performed
Chris Matthews	2011	
Chuck Palahniuk	2011	Arrangement of "Heaven & Hell" (The Who)
Ben Mezrich	2011	Arrangement of "For The Love Of Money (The O'Jays)
Neil Gaiman	2011	
David McCullough	2011	Arrangement of The Navy Theme
Ann Patchett	2011	
Joseph Ellis	2011	
Margaret Atwood	2010	
Simon Winchester	2010	
Isabel Allende	2010	
Michael Lewis	2010	
Jodi Picoult	2010	
Greg Mortenson	2009	
Stephen King	2009	
Barbara Kingsolver	2009	
Tracy Kidder	2009	
E.L. Doctorow	2009	
Ruth Reichl	2009	Arrangement of "Savoy Truffle" and "Hoedown"
Madeleine Albright	2008	Arrangement of "Slavonic Dances" by Dvořák
Gregory Maguire	2008	
Louise Erdrich	2008	
Cokie Roberts	2008	
Barbara Walters	2008	Arrangement of ABC News theme song
Richard Russo	2007	
Elmore Leonard	2007	
Anita Diamant	2007	
Mitch Albom	2006	Arrangement of "Hit Somebody" (Mitch Albom/Warren Zevon)
John Updike	2006	Arrangement of theme song from "The Witches Of Eastwick"
Dan Brown	2006	Arrangement of original music by Dan Brown
Doris Kearns Goodwin	2005	
Alan Alda	2005	Arrangement of "Suicide Is Painless"
