= Cindy Cox =

American classical composer

Cindy Cox (born 1961) is an American composer and performer, and Professor of Music. Cox grew up in Houston. She holds a Bachelor of Music in piano performance from Texas Christian University, and her Masters and Doctorate in 1992 from Indiana University Bloomington in composition, where she studied with Harvey Sollberger, Donald Erb, Eugene O’Brien, and John Eaton. She has also studied with John Harbison at the Tanglewood Music Center, and Bernard Rands and Jacob Druckman at the Aspen Music Festival. As a pianist, she studied with the Mozart and Schubert specialist Lili Kraus. As of 2011, Cox is a professor at the University of California at Berkeley.

Her orchestrations have been described as "music that demonstrates an extremely refined and imaginative sense of instrumental color and texture," "well-wrought," and "not easily classifiable." and as having "prismatic colors" that suggest "a hybrid of Olivier Messiaen and Carl Ruggles — an odd couple indeed." Tim Page has described her Into the Wild as "a dark, fertile musical fantasy with some haunting and desolate chords."

Bay Area composer Cindy Cox’s work has been called “a delight to listen to” and “buoyant, puckish, rhythmically alive and crisply engaging” by San Francisco Chronicle critic Joshua Kosman. The University of California, Berkeley professor’s music is noted for its special tunings, harmonies, and textural colorations. She has received numerous awards, commissions, and the prestigious appointment of a Fellow at both the Tanglewood Music Center and Aspen Music Festivals. Her work has been performed throughout Europe, as well as Carnegie Hall, the National Gallery, the Kennedy Center, and by the Los Angeles Philharmonic.

She is married to the poet John Campion.

== Awards ==
- American Academy of Arts and Letters
- Fromm Foundation
- National Endowment for the Arts
- American Composers Forum
- ASCAP
- Meet the Composer
- Gemeinschaft der Kunstlerinnen und Kunstfreunde International Competition for Women Composers
- Tanglewood Music Center (fellow)
- Aspen Music Festival (fellow)
- MacDowell Colony (fellow)
- Civitella Ranieri and William Walton Foundations (fellow)

== Discography ==
- Columba Aspexit: Chamber Works of Cindy Cox, New World Records, NWCR886, pub 2007
- Four Studies of Light and Dark, Society of Composers, Inc, "Extended Resources" Capstone Records, CPS-8626
- Nature Is: Music of Cindy Cox, Albany Records, Troy955
- The Other Side of the World "Points of Entry", Capstone Records CPS-8759
