= William Thomas McKinley =

American composer and executive (1938–2015)

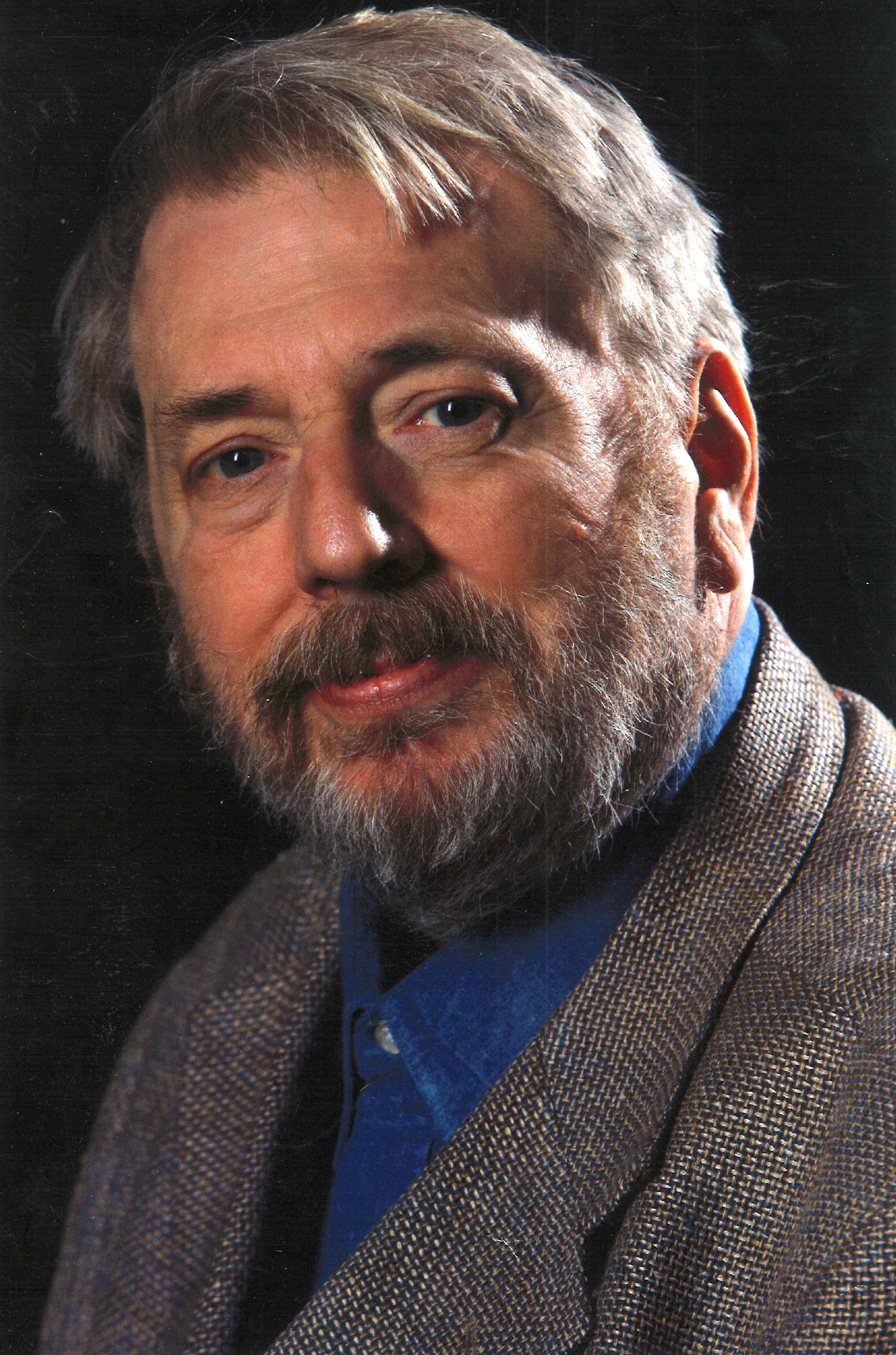
William Thomas McKinley in 2011.

William Thomas McKinley (December 9, 1938 – February 3, 2015) was an American composer and jazz pianist born in New Kensington, Pennsylvania. He wrote more than 300 musical compositions in what he called a neo-tonal style, of which Margalit Fox writes, for The New York Times, "were known for their lyricism, rhythmic propulsion and accessibility" and adds that his music "could recall not only jazz and blues but also Bach, Debussy, Ravel and Vaughan Williams.". Many of these works have been recorded by such ensembles as the London Symphony Orchestra, the Warsaw Philharmonic Orchestra, the Prague Radio Symphony Orchestra, the Boston Modern Orchestra Project, and the Seattle Symphony.

McKinley was the recipient of numerous honors, including an award and citation from the American Academy and Institute of Arts and Letters, a Guggenheim Fellowship, and eight National Endowment for the Arts grants. He is also among the founders of the label MMC Recordings.

His son Elliott Miles McKinley is also a composer.

== Early life ==
McKinley was born in New Kensington, PA to a working-class Irish-American family distantly related to his namesake twenty-fifth President of the United States. His father, Daniel, was a salesman and amateur vaudeville performer, while his mother Ellen was a dancer and piano accompanist. After divorcing during the war, Ellen married Richard Boucher, a factory worker who provided the home in which McKinley was raised and the income through which his musical talent was cultivated. At age three, he showed a talent for emulating the rhythmic patterns of big band drummers heard on the radio. By age five, he was taking piano lessons with a local teacher named Adelaide Weiss, displaying an innate ability to sight-read and improvise in excess of the standard repertoire the lessons provided. By his eleventh birthday, McKinley was already playing piano with dance bands and accompanying at a dance studio four days a week. He would soon become the youngest member of the American Federation of Musicians in Pittsburgh, making enough money to earn a substantial side income while still attending school. This early success brought him to the attention of pianist Johnny Costa (1922–1996), a legend in New Kensington nicknamed the “White Art Tatum” who spent years playing background music for Mister Rogers’ Neighborhood. Through their intermittent lessons, Costa became McKinley's first musical mentor. He introduced McKinley to other local musicians and recommended him for work in Pittsburgh, advised him on how to navigate the difficult life of the gigging musician, emphasized the value of a broad musical education, and planted the first seeds in McKinley's mind that composition might be his preferred career route. Costa's presence ensured that McKinley spent his high school years devoted to music, singing in the choir during the day, studying recordings and scores after school, and playing professionally on nights and weekends.

== Education ==
McKinley followed in the footsteps of Costa and enrolled at the Carnegie Institute of Technology (now Carnegie Mellon) in the fall of 1956. As a teenager, he had soured on making his career in what he saw as a creatively-uninspiring dance band scene, and desired to study composition instead. Despite having no formal compositional training, McKinley impressed resident professor Nikolai Lopatnikoff with a fifteen-minute improvisation in the style of Maurice Ravel during his audition, and was admitted to the school. A quirk in the structure of Carnegie Tech's music program meant that McKinley had to wait for two years before beginning his studies in composition. During this period, he studied concert piano with Leonard Eisner and continued to perform six days a week in jazz clubs and as an accompanist on campus.

McKinley was finally able to take up with Lopatnikoff for his formal composition studies in the fall of 1958. The expatriate Russian was an acolyte of the neoclassical style made famous by Paul Hindemith and Igor Stravinsky, and through his tutelage McKinley gained more technical grounding in orchestration, instrumentation, and style. His major college works (String Quartet No. 1, Adagio for Violin and Piano) reflected this neoclassical grounding, along with a generous helping of the melodic elegance of Aaron Copland. Lopatnikoff also instilled the concept that proper composition was best served by improvised elaborations upon melodic ideas, a lesson that McKinley would use in his first attempts to fuse classical and jazz techniques together in his own work.

Constant gigging and lack of opportunity slowed McKinley's compositional output in the years after his graduation from Carnegie Tech in 1960. The one work he did complete, his Trio in One Movement, won him the 1963 BMI Composition Prize and gained him admission to the Tanglewood Institute that summer. Tanglewood gave McKinley the opportunity to make professional connections unavailable to him in Pittsburgh. Copland and Iannis Xenakis were among the composition faculty that summer, and fellow students included William Albright, David Del Tredici, and Shulamit Ran. But McKinley made the most profound connection with Gunther Schuller, his assigned mentor at the institute. While other faculty and students were intent to explore the latest in serial techniques, Schuller encouraged McKinley's instincts to find workable fusions between jazz and classical music.

Upon returning from Tanglewood, he set about reinventing his entire compositional milieu, which included changing workspaces (from piano to drafting table) and styles (from neoclassical to atonal). Success, though, still eluded him as it had after graduating from Carnegie Tech. At wits end in the spring of 1966, McKinley got in touch with Mel Powell at Yale, whom he'd never met but whose work he was familiar with through recordings. Powell was an ideal person to ask for advice, since he also started as a jazz musician before transitioning into composition. McKinley spoke with Powell and sent samples of his work, which led Powell to extend an invitation to conduct graduate studies in composition. McKinley moved to New Haven and began his program that fall. Powell quickly became the kind of mentor that Lopatnikoff had been years earlier. His experiments with electronic music influenced by Anton Webern and Milton Babbitt made Powell an ideal figure to help shape McKinley's ongoing incorporation of atonal techniques. Powell also encouraged McKinley to further hone his compositional philosophy, in which orchestration is an organic outgrowth of the opening melodic ideas. His influence was so profound that McKinley would write a 1988 article praising the pedagogical methods of his former teacher.

During his three years at Yale, McKinley also managed to make connections with musicians that would become erstwhile patrons in the coming years. Foremost among these were saxophonist Les Timmig, who gave McKinley some of his earliest post-graduate commissions in the early 1970s after taking a position in Wisconsin, and clarinetist Richard Stolzman, who tapped McKinley for dozens of works over a period of twenty years.

== Teaching ==
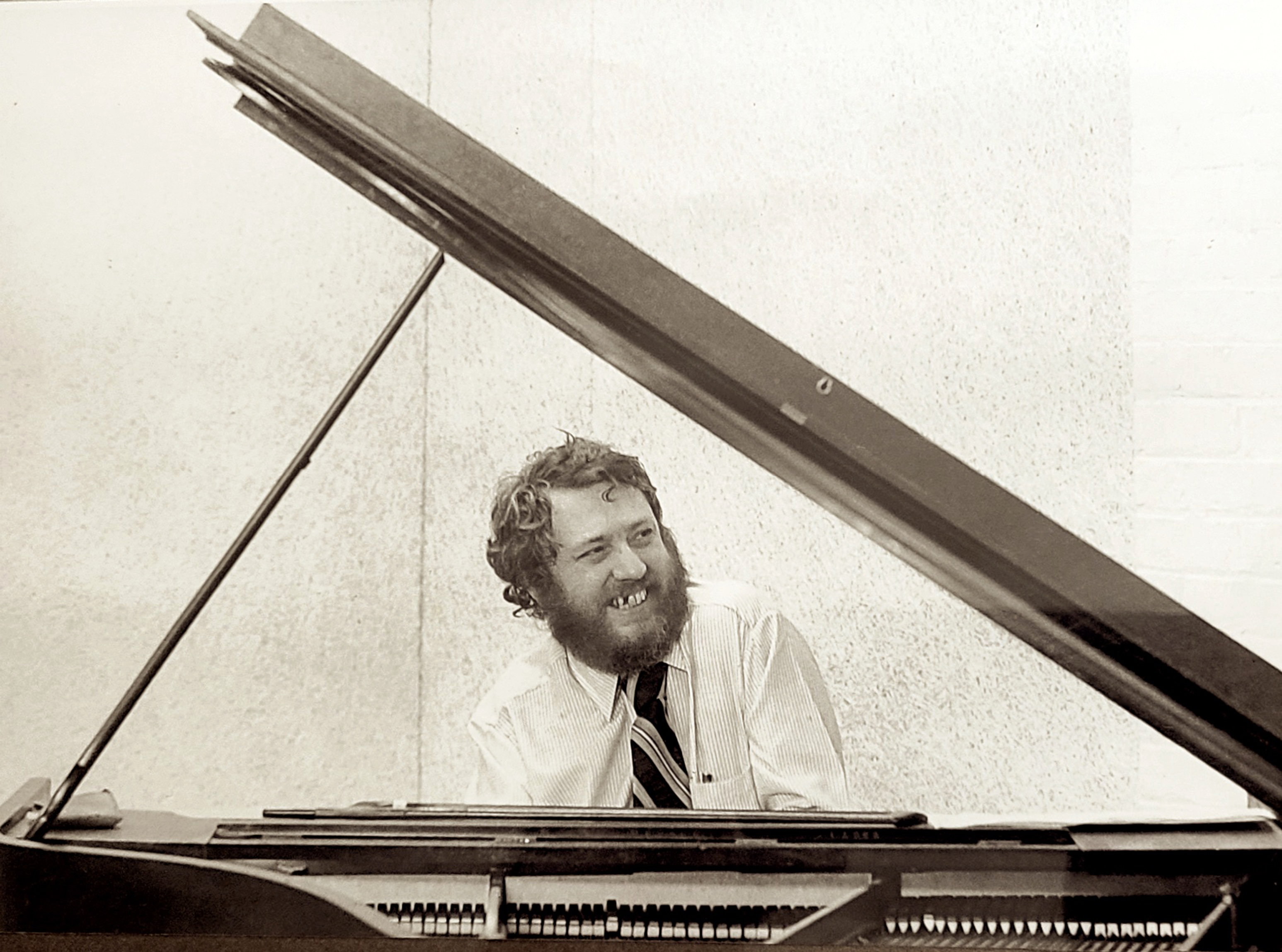
McKinley in 1979 teaching in a classroom at the New England Conservatory of Music in Boston.

McKinley began taking on theory and composition students during his senior year of college with the blessing of Alexei Haieff, a sabbatical replacement for Lopatnikoff. Among his students were saxophonists Eric Kloss and Steve Grossman. McKinley secured his first official teaching post while still enrolled at Yale, spending one semester at SUNY-Albany in the spring of 1968. After graduating in 1969, he accepted a position as an assistant professor of composition at the University of Chicago. He joined a department anchored by Easley Blackwood and Ralph Shapey, and featuring Shapey's Contemporary Chamber Players as a resident ensemble to workshop and perform new music. While at Chicago, McKinley started his own Contemporary Jazz and Improvisation Ensemble and secured his first major commission from a symphony orchestra, which became the Triple Concerto (1970) for the CSO. After three years, though, he grew weary of the music department's lack of support for his interest in jazz and his intuition-based style of composition. After turning down a job at Swarthmore College that would have provided a similar environment to the one he sought to escape in Chicago, McKinley was offered a position at the New England Conservatory by his old Tanglewood mentor Schuller. He accepted and began teaching at the institution in the fall of 1973.

At NEC, McKinley was finally encouraged to pursue his lifelong interest in creating music ensconced in both the jazz and classical worlds. Schuller had built the program to utilize the specific cross-genre talents of composers like McKinley, George Russell, and Jaki Byard. Although he was hired into the composition department, McKinley took an active role in the development of the Jazz Studies program from the start. In piano lessons, jazz harmony courses, and ensemble coaching, he emphasized creative development of improvisational voice over commercial skills, and his style of spontaneity in lieu of structure made him popular amongst his students. Con Chapman, a former student at NEC, wrote that McKinley often told students that only two emotions were worthy of expression in jazz performance: rage and introspection. In 1978, McKinley became chair of the rebranded Department of Afro-American Studies. By his own admission, this period as an administrator was less than pleasant, but he still accomplished a great deal. Among other things, he added Miroslav Vitouš and Bobby Moses to the department, and helped to restructure part of the curriculum by adding a course in standard repertoire. Because running the department interfered with his growing body of commissions, he stepped down in 1981, and after returning temporarily for a year left administration for good in 1983. McKinley stayed on at NEC to teach in both the composition and jazz studies departments until his retirement in 1992, and afterward continued to teach piano and composition privately until his death.

== Performing career ==
McKinley secured his first paying performance opportunity with the Audrey Ann Dance Dancing Studio in New Kensington, where he played after school at the age of nine or ten. While in high school, his mentor Costa recommended him for a number of jobs in Pittsburgh and other cities in the area that helped to establish McKinley as a performer of great skill for his age. During the course of his college studies, McKinley performed several nights a week at the Midway Lounge in downtown Pittsburgh, where he played with luminaries Sonny Stitt and King Pleasure. This was in addition to more commercial gigs accompanying Neil Sedaka and The Four Freshmen that he took primarily to support his growing family. After returning from Tanglewood, McKinley reached an impasse playing in Pittsburgh's conservative jazz scene. By his own description, McKinley was playing a modern style “with a bigger harmonic spectrum…[and] more on top of the beat” that he reflected would become more widespread during the 1970s. Upon moving to New Haven, he was instantly by his own account the best jazz pianist in town, and spent the next three years playing six nights a week and working with any major jazz figure who happened to need a pianist while in New Haven.

He continued to play on the side to supplement his day job as a professor. During his three years in Chicago, McKinley performed often at the Jazz Showcase, a venerated club that first opened in 1947. At that locale, McKinley crossed paths with figures like Dexter Gordon, Hank Mobley, and Art Farmer, though he admitted performing there was motivated more by money than artistry. Shortly after taking his position at NEC, McKinley played in a group called Departed Feathers in collaboration with Thomas Oboe Lee, a jazz performance major at the school and fellow Pittsburgh native. McKinley saw Lee perform at the Orson Welles Theater in Cambridge in a group featuring members of Gary Burton’s band, and was struck to hear them playing in a style similar to that which he’d wanted to play since the late-1950s. The band would play in Boston two to three nights a week during McKinley’s early years at NEC.

While his primary focus was on cutting recordings of his chamber works, McKinley did find time to produce some recordings of his piano work. He produced Improv Quartet Live (1975) with Timmig, a frequent patron of McKinley’s chamber works during the 1970s. A recording of a live set featuring McKinley and Vitouš at Michael’s Pub in Boston on October 8, 1980 was released as the album Earth Cycle (1980). Life Cycle (1981) was released on Schuller’s GM Label, featuring drummer Billy Hart, bassist Ed Schuller, saxophonist Joe Lovano, trumpeter Tom Harrell, and trombonist Gary Valente.

== Compositional Periods ==
Per the bio-bibliography compiled and written by musicologist Jeffrey Sposato, we can divide McKinley’s output into three major periods. The first, termed his neoclassical period (1959-1964), primarily reflects the influence of Lopatnikoff at Carnegie Tech. These early works focus on the development of melodic ideas in the Stravinsky-Hindemith neoclassical tradition, McKinley’s own interest in Copland, and his jazz performance background which brought forth a great deal of rhythmic syncopation. McKinley would later describe his overall philosophy regarding these early works as such:

My earliest mentors at Carnegie Tech did not believe in “cerebral” music. They taught that the mystical union of mind with spirit is paramount to the creative psyche, and they helped me to see the line of descent from the great masters to the present. When this heritage was coupled with my purely American jazz spirit, it was clear how my musical instincts would be revealed, and how my “American-ness” would manifest itself from the duality I traversed during these years.

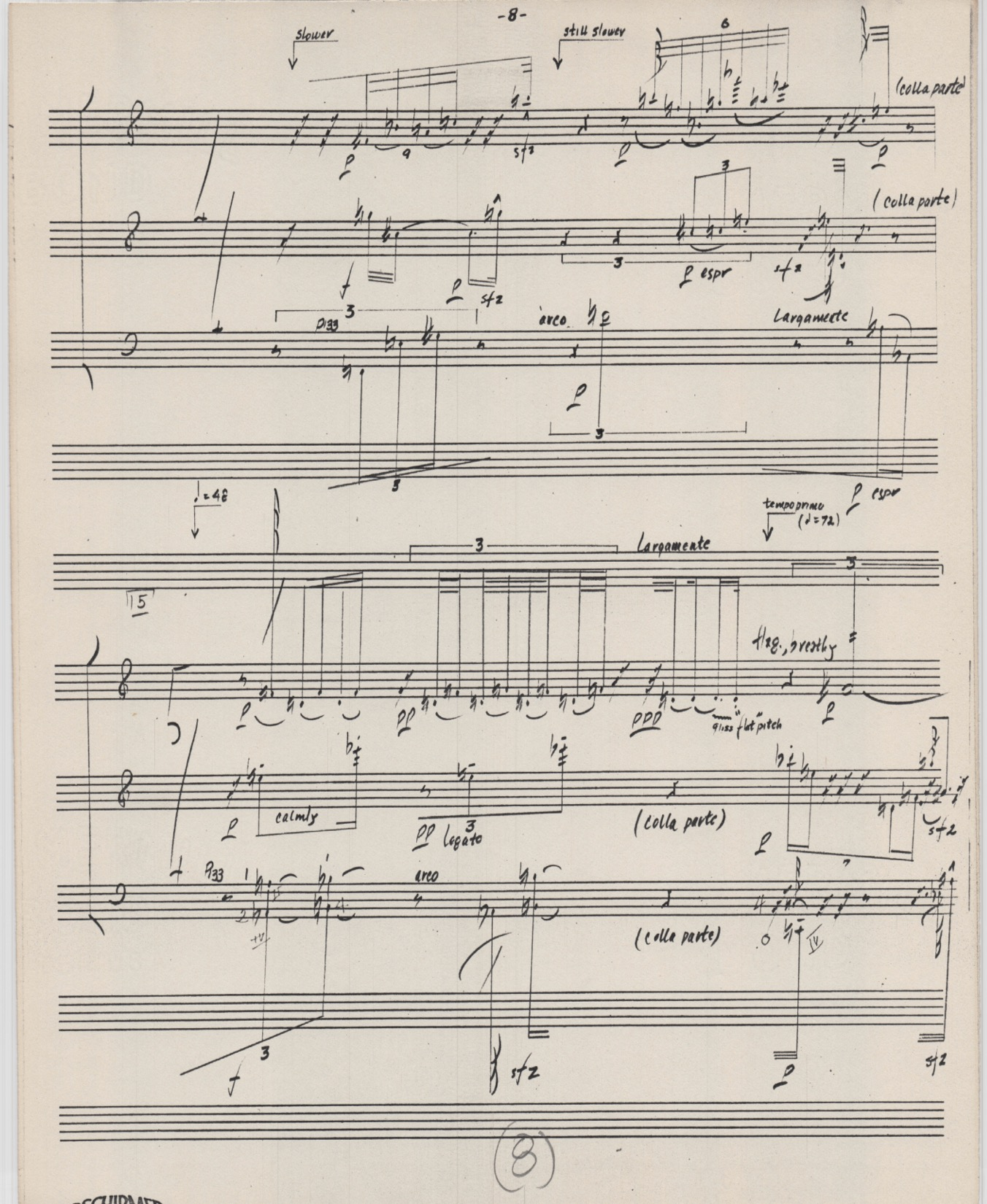
A page from an early work, "Attitudes" (1967)

In an interview with Gail Coffer, McKinley termed this mentality as “anti-order,” where creativity is intuitively incorporated into the process of composition. This ideal was cultivated early on, and is one of the most tangible elements undergirding his musical output from all facets of his long career. Unfortunately, there are few traces of his music from this neoclassical period, as most scores and the few recordings made have been lost. McKinley's own descriptions of these works in a smattering of interviews like those referenced thus far are all that remain prior to his enrollment at Yale.

Although a move from his neoclassical roots had been in the works for a while, only after beginning his studies with Powell did McKinley's second, atonal period (1965–1980) begin to emerge. He framed this move as a compromise between his sense of anti-order and intuition-based writing practice and the dominant strain of serialism suffusing American composition departments during that era. A serial aesthetic was thus achieved without recourse to what McKinley called the “logical positivist” aspects of the serial process. An early example can be found in the trio Attitudes (1967), his first work featuring Stolzman that includes extreme range jumps, instrumental effects, and a mercurial relationship between the content of each part - all hallmarks of works in this period. Yet McKinley wanted to harness these techniques into the service of an enhanced relationship between lyricism and virtuosity. In the program notes for the chamber piece Paintings No. 1 (1972), he mentions that all of his work tries to emphasize these qualities even if they are obscured from the listener by the “non-melodic” and “non-linear” aspects of works like this. Negotiating this tension became a central component to all of McKinley's work through the 1970s, from solo pieces (For One, Eleven Interludes, Songs Without Words) to his first forays into larger chamber works (Triple Concerto, Concertino). Many, like the Paintings series (written throughout the decade), feature eclectic combinations of woodwinds, strings, and percussion written for small groups of friends and frequent collaborators.

Once he emerged from working in administration at NEC, McKinley began to more directly question the presence and role of tonal language in his music. These ruminations marked the beginning of his move into a final, neotonal period (1981–2015) that would define McKinley's oeuvre for the rest of his life. The transformation to tonality was spurred in part from frustrations with reconciling his jazz background and classical study with the rough edges inherent in serial and atonal techniques. McKinley would credit Philip Glass and Steve Reich for pushing these frustrations to the forefront of his mind, though he took no direct inspiration from minimalist techniques. These questions also grew from pedagogical concerns related to his teaching at NEC. What purpose did it serve, McKinley wondered, if composition students were first told to study the tonality of Bach, Beethoven, and Schubert but write their own works using techniques lacking any tonality at all? The answer, for McKinley, was a return to unobscured harmony and melody, “what pleases me so much, like a little kid.”

His first notable embrace of this transformation came when writing Goodbye (1981), a work commissioned by Stoltzman and based on a song made famous by Benny Goodman, in which the original melody served as a cantus firmus. Ruminating on the success of this work, McKinley came to the following conclusion:

And in the process of writing that piece, and bringing my jazz harmonic background into written rather than improvised form, where it had always remained, I thought to myself, “My God,” I thought I could write a symphony doing this. I could write a string quartet. I should be using this [tonal] language. What have I been doing all these years? I’ve been leaving out everything I know!

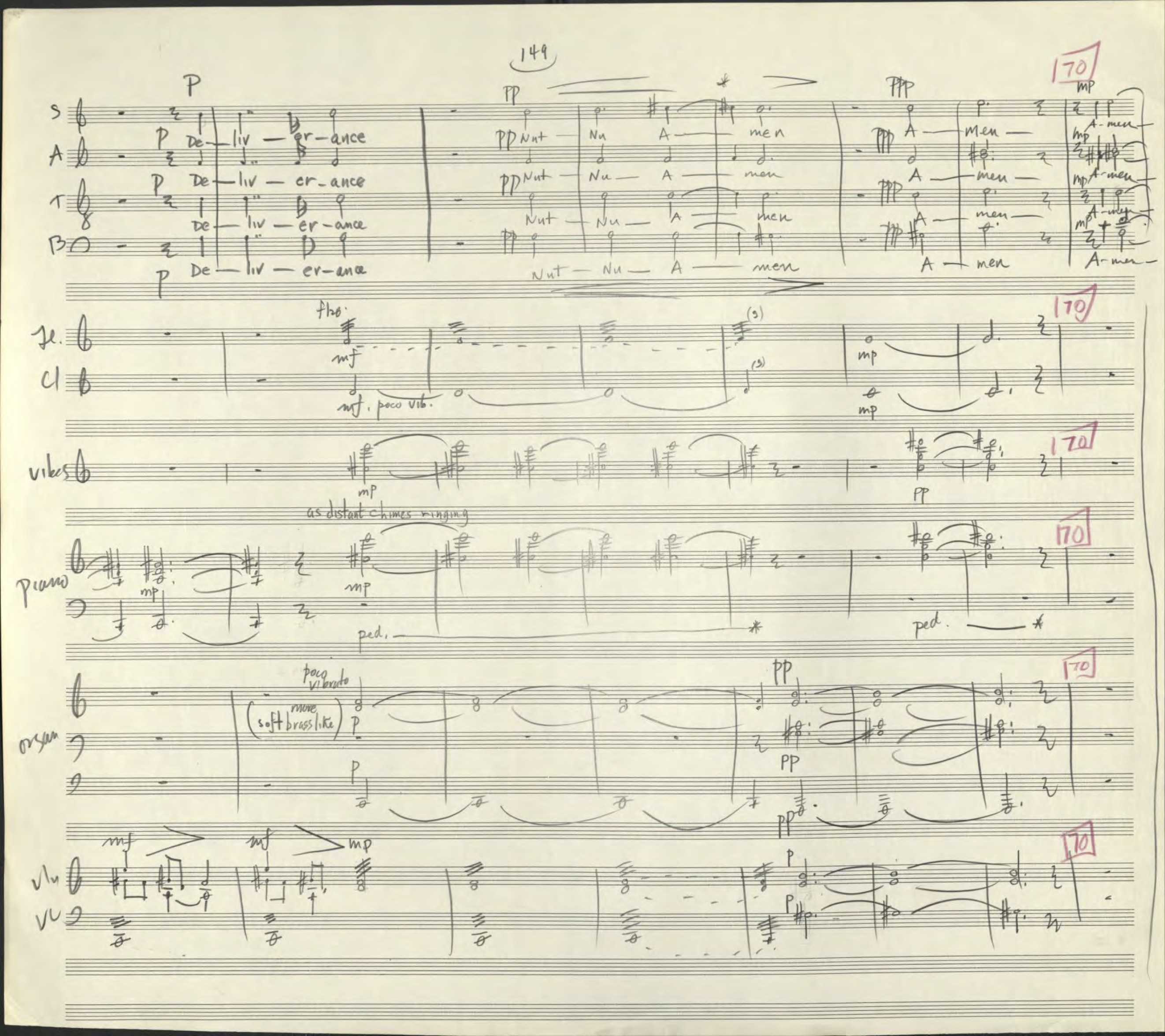
A page from McKinley's "Deliverance, Amen" (1983), an oratorio.

He followed this with series of works in more traditional ensemble and genre orientations, a contrast to the eclectic chamber arrangements that dominated his work in the 1970s. Among the most well known were his tone poem The Mountain (1982), an orchestral work of Brahmsian grandeur dedicated to fellow neotonal auteur John Harbison, the oratorio Deliverance, Amen (1983), and his “Romantic” Symphony No. 3 (1984), the product of his Koussitevsky Foundation commission. This neotonal turn coincided with a period of heightened exposure in the world of American classical composition. McKinley was featured in a 1981 segment for NPR’s RadioVisions, a program about contemporary concert music, called “Notes from the Steel City” featuring composers from Pittsburgh. Produced by Mark Yacavonne for WQED, the program featured music and interviews from McKinley, Daniel Lentz, and David Stock on their mentors, influences, and neo-classical backgrounds. Commissions from the Seattle Symphony and the Boston Pops were coupled with a series of National Endowment for the Arts grants, the aforementioned Koussitevsky fellowship, and culminating in a Guggenheim Fellowship for Creative Arts in 1985.

== Recording Company ==
By the early 1990s, McKinley recognized the lack of opportunities for composers to record their music outside of major labels like Sony Classics and Deutsche Grammophon. Some successful recordings of his own work in Eastern Europe became the impetus for incorporating his own company to fill the gap. With the help of old friends like Stoltzman, the late conductor and pianist Robert Black, and conductor Gerard Schwartz, McKinley left full-time teaching to form Master Musicians Collective (MMC) in 1992. The modus operandi for MMC, in McKinley's own words, was to “help composers connect with the listening public and vice versa and have built a wonderfully diverse catalog of truly outstanding modern music."

McKinley ran MMC as an in-house, threadbare operation. When music entrepreneur Bob Lord came aboard to assist with day-to-day operation of MMC in 2005, he mused at the cognitive dissonance of a company producing recordings of major symphony orchestras while working out of “a century-old dilapidated house with a couple of run-down computers resting on bedroom doors pulled from their frames and laid atop wooden sawhorses, with piles of dust lingering in forgotten fireplaces.” Lord ended up purchasing MMC's entire catalog in 2008 and folded it into his new venture, PARMA Recordings.

== Personal life ==
McKinley met Marlene Midler while playing at a club in Pittsburgh in 1955, although they were already passing acquaintances from the school choir. They married on April 11, 1956. Marlene would later finish a Ph.D. in literature from the University of Chicago and teach in the English department of Suffolk University for over forty years. Together they had five sons: Joseph Thomas (1957–2022), Derek Scott (b. 1961), Jory Damon (1962–2019), Gregory Sëan (b. 1965), and Elliott Miles (b. 1969) who notably became a composer, and currently serves as assistant professor of Music Composition, Theory, and Technology at Roger Williams University in Bristol, RI.

== Death and legacy ==
McKinley died on the morning of February 3, 2015 at his home in Reading, Massachusetts.

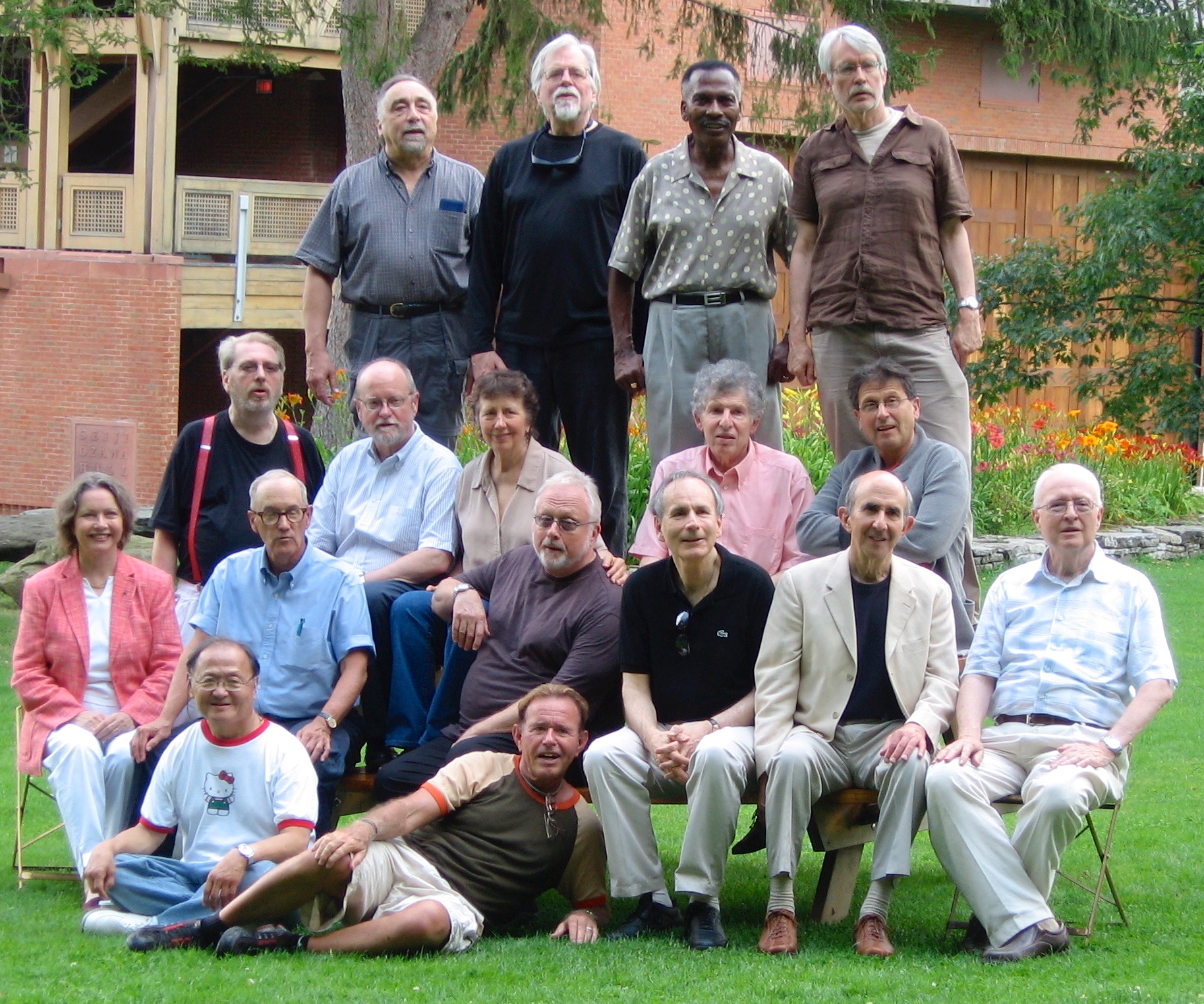
Tanglewood Music Center celebration of the "Generation of 1938" in August, 2007. Top Row (L to R): Harvey Sollberger, David Borden, Olly Wilson, John Harbison. Middle Row: William Thomas McKinley, Charles Wuorinen, Joan Tower, Richard Teitelbaum, Alvin Curran. Bottom Row (seated): Ellen Taaffe Zwilich, John Heiss, William Bolcom, Stanley Silverman, David Chaitkin, Charles Fussell. Front (on ground): Paul Chihara, David Del Tredici

After his death, McKinley's family established a foundation in his name, the William Thomas McKinley Foundation for American Music to carry forth his legacy as a composer, pianist, and educator with an ongoing mission to promulgate his music in print and recordings as well as public outreach through grants and scholarships for promising young composers. McKinley donated nearly two-thirds of his notes and manuscripts to the Boston Public Library in 1996, which to that date was the largest single donation to the library by an American composer since Walter Piston in 1978. Shortly after his death, it was discovered that several pages from McKinley's donated scores were missing, and feared stolen. After a lengthy search, the pages were found in a nearby location and presumed to be misfiled. The incident contributed to the resignation of BPL President Amy Ryan, under whose watch other high-profile works by Albrecht Dürer and Rembrandt had gone missing.

== Selected awards and honors ==
Fromm Music Foundation Fellowship (1963, 1967, 1970)

BMI Student Composer Award (1963)

National Endowment for the Arts Fellowship (1976, 1977, 1978, 1979, 1980, 1981, 1983, 1984, 1985, 1989)

Pulitzer Prize in Composition Nomination (1976)

Walter W. Naumberg Foundation Award for Chamber Music Commission (1976)

Massachusetts Arts and Humanities Foundation (1977)

Tanglewood Faculty Fellow (1978, 1979)

American Academy of Arts and Letters Award (1983)

Koussevitsky Music Foundation at the Library of Congress Award (1983)

Honorable Mention, New England Composers Competition (1983)

Guggenheim Memorial Foundation Fellowship (1985)

== Selected works ==
See also The William Thomas McKinley Foundation Life and Works Timeline

Chamber and Solo Works

Piano Trio No. 1 (1963)

Directions (1965)

Attitudes (1967)

For One (1971)

Eleven Interludes for Piano (1971)

Fantasies and Inventions for Harpsichord (1972)

Etudes No. 1 and 2 for Solo Harp (1973 / 1974)

From Opera No. 2 (1976) [“Tashi”]

Six Impromptus (1978)

Blues Lament for Clarinet and Piano (1981)

Trio Appassionato (1982)

Duo Concerto for Flute and Piano (1983)

August Symphony (1983)

March Symphony (1984)

Three Romances for Flute and Piano (1984)

Suite No. 1 for Violoncello (1984)

Three Romances for Flute and Piano (1984)

Concert Music for Brass Quintet (1985)

Sonata for Viola and Piano (1985)

Sonata for Clarinet and Piano (1986)

Preludes for Piano Book I (1988)

Piano Quartet (1988)

Piano Trio No. 2 (1992)

Twenty-Four Etudes (and Postlude) for Solo Piano (2006)

Piano Sonata (2010)

Preludes for Piano Book II (2011)

Piano Trio No. 3 (2014)

Concerti

Triple Concerto for Jazz Trio and Orchestra (1970)

Concerto No. 1 for Piano and Orchestra (1974)

Concerto No. 1 for Clarinet and Orchestra (1977)

Concerto No. 1 for Viola and Orchestra (1978)

Concerto No. 1 for Cello and Orchestra (1978)

Concerto No. 2 for Viola and Orchestra (1985)

Sinfonie Concertante (1985)

Double Concerto (1985) [“Golden Pedals”]

Concerto for Flute and String Orchestra (1986)

Concerto No. 2 for Piano and Orchestra (1987) [“O’Leary”]

Concerto No. 2 for Clarinet and Orchestra (1990)

Silent Whispers (1992) for Piano and Orchestra

Concerto No. 3 for Viola and Orchestra (1993)

Concerto No. 3 for Piano and Orchestra (1994)

Concerto No. 3 for Clarinet and Orchestra (1994)

Concerto No. 1 for Violin, Viola and Orchestra (1994) [“Concert Variations”]

Concerto No. 1 for Violin and Orchestra (1995) [“Seasons”]

“Crazy Rags” for String Quartet and Orchestra (1997)

Tango, Intermezzo, and Dance for Violin and Orchestra (1999)

Six Movements for Clarinet and Orchestra (2000)

Orchestral Works

Concerto for Orchestra No. 1 (1974)

Concertino for Grand Orchestra (1976)

Symphony No. 1 in one movement (1977)

Symphony No. 2 (1978)

The Mountain (1982)

Symphony No. 3 (1984) [“Romantic”]

Symphony No. 4 (1985)

Boston Overture (1986)

Symphony No. 5 (1989) [“Irish”]

New York Overture (1989)

Concerto for Orchestra No. 2 (1993)

Lightning (1994)

Flyin’ Home (1997)

Symphony No. 6 (1998) [“Prague”]

Meteor (2006)

Comet (2006)

Elegy for Strings (2006)

Symphony No. 7 (2006)

Symphony No. 8 (2009) [“Universe”]

Choral & Vocal Works

Six Pieces for Soprano and Piano (1972)

Five Songs (1973)

Eliot for Mixed Chorus (1976)

Four Text Settings (1979) for SATB chorus

Deliverance, Amen (1983) an oratorio

New York Memories (1987)

Totentanz (1992)

Mauern (1992)

Dallas, 1963 for Baritone and Orchestra (1993)

Missa Futura (2000)

In the Beginning (2008)

Sir Orfeo (2009)

Four Late Songs (2011)

Ten Medieval Songs (2014)

String Quartets

String Quartet No. 1 (1959)

String Quartet No. 2 (1973) “Galaxy”

String Quartet No. 3 (1976)

String Quartet No. 4 (1976) “Fantasia Concertante”

String Quartet No. 5 (1977) “Six Movements”

String Quartet No. 6 (1986)

String Quartet No. 7 (1988)

String Quartet No. 8 (1992)

String Quartet No. 9 (1994)

Large Chamber Works and “Paintings” Series

From Opera (1968)

Quadruplum (1970)

Paintings No. 1 (1972)

Paintings No. 2 (1975)

Paintings No. 3 (1976)

Paintings No. 4 (1978) [“magical visions”]

Paintings No. 5 (1979)

Paintings No. 6 (1981) [“to hear the light dancing”]

Paintings No. 7 (1982)

Poem of Light (1983)

Paintings No. 8 (1988)

Chamber Concerto No. 3 (1991)
