= Classical Discoveries =

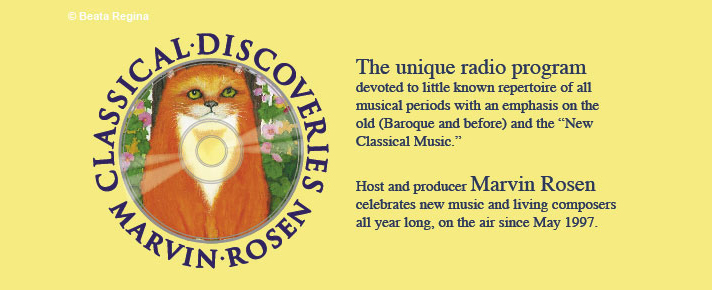
- The Classical Discoveries logo as seen on the official website
- Genre: contemporary music music education
- Running time: 7.5 hours, weekly
- Country of origin: United States
- Home station: WPRB
- Hosted by: Marvin Rosen
- Created by: Marvin Rosen
- Written by: Marvin Rosen
- Produced by: Marvin Rosen
- Recording studio: WPRB Princeton, NJ
- Original release: 1997 – present
- Website: http://www.classicaldiscoveries.org

Classical Discoveries is a live radio program hosted and produced by American pianist, musicologist and music educator, Marvin Rosen. The program airs on WPRB 103.3 FM, a commercial, non-profit, community-supported independent radio station. The 14,000 watt radio station, once part of Princeton University, broadcasts from Princeton, New Jersey, and is managed and hosted by Princeton University students, and community DJ’s like Rosen. WPRB with its strong signal can be heard in New Jersey, parts of Delaware, Pennsylvania and New York, as well as over the Internet at www.wprb.com.

Rosen has hosted and produced Classical Discoveries since May 1997.

== Program Overview ==
Classical Discoveries celebrates and showcases little-known music of all periods with an emphasis on the Baroque period and earlier, as well as on the 20th and 21st centuries. The show's primary aim is to allow listening audiences to discover (hence the title Classical Discoveries) the vast amount of music that is being created today from all over the world. With regard to his work Rosen states: "I always want to prove to the world that there is so much wonderful new music fitting every discriminating taste in our century."

In 2007, Classical Discoveries Goes Avant-Garde was created. This special edition of Classical Discoveries features more modern and electronic music. Both radio programs air back to back on Wednesdays from 5:30 to 1pm, with the Avant-Garde edition beginning at 11am. Due to the nature of the station, Rosen often hosts additional times, especially during the student winter and summer breaks. He also occasionally hosts other shows such as Opera and Jazz.

Each program broadcasts anywhere between 2 and 5.5 hours with most special programs currently lasting 5.5 hours. On occasion, Classical Discoveries can last between 11 and 24 hours. Each typical program is unique and is a showcase for mostly lesser and unknown composers and works. In his programs one will find examples of folk and ethnic music, jazz, pop, and Rock and Roll to illustrate various musical points. However, the main focus of the program is to introduce radio listeners to new music and living composers.

== Special Programs ==
From 2001 Rosen has produced and presented over 50 Early Music specials, over 50 specials featuring music from other countries and regions, over 40 operas, and over 200 other specials devoted to different themes, topics, subjects, historical periods, etc. These programs include live 24-hour music marathons, musical portraits of living composers, music for the holidays, music by women composers, music by American composers and live interviews with composers, performers and music personalities. Since 2001 Rosen has broadcast over 40 live interviews with living composers such as Lisa Bielawa, George Crumb, Jennifer Higdon, Barbara Harbach, Steven Mackey, Robert Moran, Paul Moravec, Daniel Bernard Roumain (DBR), and Arnold Rosner. He has also interviewed individual performers like Maya Beiser, and members of ensembles such as Ethel, and Piffaro

Below are some specific examples of the many special programs presented on Classical Discoveries.

Annual programs

- In Praise of Woman – In observance of women's history month in March, the program showcases music written by women
- Birthday and Memorial Tribute to Alan Hovhaness – devoted to music of the American composer Alan Hovhaness, including 24 Hour Centennial Marathon
- The Ink is Still Wet/Viva 21st Century - program devoted to new music just composed in the 21st century
- Music of Americas - celebrates Thanksgiving Holiday with music of composers of the American Continent
- Sacred Bridges - program celebrating Christian, Jewish and Muslim heritage for holidays

Programs Devoted to One Country or Geographical Regions

- In the Footsteps of William Tell - Musical Voyage to Switzerland
- Frescores of Kieve - Musical Voyage to Ukraine
- For Japan - 8 hour tribute to music by Japanese composers
- Voyage to the Rainbow Nation - South Africa
- Voyage to the Land of Kiwi - musical voyage to New Zealand
- 11½ Hours Around the World - music from all around the world written in the last 13 years (to commemorate the 13th year anniversary of Classical Discoveries)
- From Jakarta to Jayapura - entire program devoted to works inspired by Indonesia's islands as well as works by Indonesian composers
- In the Shadows of "The Knights of Malta" - music of Maltese composers
- Land of Fire - musical voyage to Azerbaijan

Some Other Programs

- We Remember September 11 - Live 24 hour marathon totally devoted to music written as a reaction to the unforgettable events of that day (This broadcast was presented on the 10th anniversary of 9/11.)
- "Yesterday" - In Memory of Jim Nettleton – memorial to Rosen’s favorite Oldies DJ
- In Memory of Henry Brant - Pioneer of Spatial Music
- In Memoriam of the Victims of 9/11 - 5 hour presentation of works composed in memory of the victims of 9/11 attacks
- Warsaw Autumn - The 50 Anniversary - 2 special programs
- So Young - program devoted to music of young composers under 30
- Music for Unusual Instruments

== Premiere Broadcasts ==
Through the years many new music works have been given world and American broadcast premieres. Recent broadcasts include:

- Wildland by Jakub Ciupiński - World Premiere Broadcast (January 11, 2012)
- White Interment, Chamber Symphony for Oboe and Strings (2002) by Victoria Poleva - American Broadcast Premiere (October 19, 2011)
- Trinity Requiem (2011) (Commemorating the 10th Anniversary of September 11, 2001) by Robert Moran - World Premiere Broadcast (August 3, 2011)
- Tekeeyah (a call) for Shofar, Trombone and Orchestra (2009) by Meira Warshauer - World Premiere Broadcast (May 4, 2011)
- "Missa 1956" for Vocal Soloists, Choir and Orchestra (2006) by Jacek Sylkulski - American Broadcast Premiere (November 10, 2010)
- For a Violet Cloud (1998) for Piano and Percussion (1988) Barbara Monk Feldman - World Premiere Broadcast (September 1, 2010)
- Sinfonia Africana (2004) by Hendrik Hofmeyr - American Broadcast Premiere (June 2, 2010)
- Fortress by Robert Moran - World Premiere Broadcast (April 28, 2010)
- Sonata for Solo Viola, Op. 423 (1992) by Alan Hovhaness - World Premiere Broadcast (January 27, 2010)

== Program Production ==
Classical Discoveries is not supported by any grants or endowments. The production of the program does not involve any expense, since WPRB is a student run station hosted by volunteers responsible for their own programming. Rosen is programmer, producer, researcher, engineer and host and uses his own CD/records collection for each program. Each program is prepared at his home only a few days in advance. He maintains an extensive website for his program which includes playlists going back to 2001. These are updated within a few hours after the airing of each program. Each playlist contains links to composers, as well as sources for purchasing available Cd’s. On special programs links to related subjects on the playlist are provided for the listeners convenience.

== Recognition ==
In October 2005, Classical Discoveries received the prestigious ASCAP – Deems Taylor Broadcast Award. In addition to receiving such a great honor, Classical Discoveries has been a popular subject of discussion among the contemporary music community. Stave Layton of Sequenza 21/The Contemporary Classical Music Community praised Rosen's work in promoting the music of living composers. Referring to Rosen's American edition of 24-hour marathon called Viva 21st Century he states: "It's safe to say that there's just about nothing else on the airwaves that can match that achievement."

Because of its unique and unconventional approach to classical radio, the program has caught the attention of many newspapers, Internet magazines, and blogs. "It's a combination of public and global service that Marvin Rosen does for contemporary music." states Susan Van Dongen of Time Off (of the Princeton Packet). In August 2008, Jeff Rosenfeld of The San Francisco Classical Voice named Classical Discoveries as one of his recommended sources of Internet radio and in April 2010, Rosen appeared as a guest on Jersey Arts: The Podcast for an interview with Susan Wallner. The podcast was a highlighted discussion about Classical Discoveries and Rosen's work as being a long time radio host with WPRB 103.3 FM. In addition, Azerbaijan International Magazine recognized Rosen as being the first in the history of classical radio in the United States to present a vast amount of music of their country. In August 2004 Rosen presented 5 hours of uninterrupted classical music by Azeri composers.
