= William Black (pianist) =

American pianist and teacher (1952–2003)

William David Black (February 23, 1952 – December 10, 2003) was an American pianist and teacher.

== Biography ==
He was born in Dallas, Texas. He had a sister, Beverley, and a brother, the pianist, conductor and composer Robert Black. He studied at Oberlin College; with Rosina Lhévinne and Beveridge Webster at the Juilliard School in New York, earning a master's degree in 1976 and a doctorate in 1979; and at the Mozarteum in Salzburg, Austria.

He gave recitals and concerts at such venues in the United States as the Kennedy Center, Carnegie Hall and Lincoln Center, and in many overseas countries. He was a longtime consulting editor for Keyboard Classics/Piano Today.

He joined the piano department at the University of Cincinnati's College-Conservatory of Music in 1987. At his death, he was chair of the department.

In 1992, Black was the official U.S. representative at the First Shenyang International Music Festival in China.

William Black died of cancer in 2003, aged 51. He was survived by his widow, twin children, parents and sister. His brother Robert had also died of cancer, in 1993, aged only 43.

The William Black Memorial Prize in Piano, a $5,000 scholarship to support undergraduate piano study, is the only program of its kind in U.S. music schools and conservatories.

== Recordings ==
In 1991 William Black made the premiere recording of the second (1927) version of Rachmaninoff's Fourth Piano Concerto, with Igor Buketoff conducting the Iceland Symphony Orchestra. As of 2023, it was still the only commercial recording ever made of that version, although non-commercial recordings exist.

== Sources ==
- The Juilliard Journal Online
- FuneralNet
