= Marvin Rosen =

- Genre: Contemporary music
- Instrument: Piano
- Website: www.classicaldiscoveries.org

Marvin Rosen is an American pianist, music educator, musicologist and host of the weekly radio program Classical Discoveries, which airs on WPRB 103.3 FM in Princeton, New Jersey. He is best known for his work in promoting the music of living composers as well as the music of Alan Hovhaness.

== Musical studies ==
Rosen earned his bachelor's degree in music education from the College of New Jersey and a master's degree in musicology from the Manhattan School of Music. In addition, he studied at the Teacher's College, Columbia University, where he completed both his master's and doctorate degrees in music education. He studied piano with Shirley Bachelor and Karl Ulrich Schnabel and piano pedagogy with Robert Pace as well as with Frances Clark and Louise Goss at the New School for Music Study in Kingston, New Jersey.

== Work and friendship with Alan Hovhaness ==
In January 1980, Rosen met Alan Hovhaness for the first time in New York after hearing the world-premiere performance of Symphony No. 34. After their initial encounter, the two corresponded with one another by letter. That following June, the two had another meeting at Rosen's home in Princeton, New Jersey. It was there that Rosen had the opportunity to play for Hovhaness many of his piano works. Also, it marked the beginning of a musical collaboration and friendship. While Rosen was studying at Teachers College, Columbia University, he wrote his doctoral dissertation on Hovhaness’s music, presenting a pedagogical analysis on five of his piano sonatas.

In addition, he recorded two compact discs of Hovhaness’s piano music for Koch International Classics, which are Fred the Cat: Half a Century of Piano Music (1992) and Vision of a Starry Night: More Half a Century of Piano Music (1994). He has also written other liner notes for Koch International as well as notes for Albany Music and MMC Recordings.

== Performances and lectures ==
Rosen has presented recitals totally devoted to the music of Alan Hovhaness in Princeton, Chicago and New York. He also performs music of the 20th and 21st centuries, primarily by living composers. Many of his performances have featured both world and American premieres. Some of his most significant performances include a lecture recital on American music at the Karlowicz Music School in Katowice, Poland, and a recital at the Szustra Palace in Warsaw. In addition, he presented a lecture recital at the Phillips Collection in Washington, D.C.

He has presented lecture series at the College Music Society’s Northeast Chapter meetings, which include Music Of Alan Hovhaness, Classical Radios Role in the New Millennium, and The Fuguing Tunes of Henry Cowell. Other lectures given for other organizations are courses on New Music, Music of Women Composers and most recently The Voices Behind the Walls, which was about music composed by nuns during the Baroque Era.

== Classical Discoveries ==
Since May 1997, Rosen has been the host and producer of Classical Discoveries, a weekly radio program which airs on WPRB 103.3 FM and online around the world at wprb.com. The program celebrates and showcases little-known music of all periods with an emphasis on Baroque and before, as well as the 20th and 21st centuries. In 2005, Classical Discoveries was awarded the ASCAP – Deems Taylor Broadcast Award. In 2007, Rosen began hosting Classical Discoveries Goes Avant-Garde, which features more modern and electronic music. He has had numerous composers and musical artists as featured guests on both his programs, including George Crumb, Jennifer Higdon, Arnold Rosner, Maya Beiser, Steven Mackey, Ethel, Piffaro, and many more.

== Teaching ==
Rosen has taught piano at the New School For Music Study in Kingston, New Jersey, and has taught piano and music theory at the Settlement Music School in Philadelphia, Pennsylvania. Currently, he is a full-time faculty member at Westminster Conservatory of Music in Princeton, New Jersey, where he teaches piano, music history for the Young Artists Program and Musical Styles for the Piano Pedagogy Certification Program.
