= Sergio Cervetti =

Uruguayan composer and musician (born 1940)

- Born: Sergio Cervetti Guigou; November 9, 1940 (age 86); Dolores, Uruguay
- Genres: Classical, electronic music
- Occupations: composer and music pedagogue
- Instrument: Piano
- Label: PARMA Recordings
- Publishers: Schott; Boosey & Hawkes; Ricordi; Peer Southern
- Awards: Gaudeamus International Composers Award (1970); Global Music Awards Gold Medal (2019)
- Website: Official website

Sergio Cervetti Guigou (born 9 November 1940 in Dolores, Soriano) is a Uruguayan composer and teacher domiciled in the United States. His early compositional language reflects the post serialist Uruguayan avant-garde, often employing electronics and complex graphical notation. He gained international prominence in 1966 when he achieved first place with 5 Episodes for Piano Trio in the Inter-American Music Festival in Caracas, Venezuela. His compositions have been widely recorded on labels such as Albany Records, Vienna Modern Masters, and Navona Records, which have been reviewed in Gramophone and The Washington Post. His music has been played by renowned orchestras such as the London Symphony Orchestra and New York City Opera.

== Biography ==
Sergio Cervetti was exposed to music at a young age by his parents. His Italian father was a clarinettist and his French mother helped motivate him to learn the piano. His early piano studies were with José María Martino Rodas and Hugo Balzo and later studied counterpoint and harmony at the National Conservatory with Carlos Estrada and Guido Santorsola.

In 1962 he left Uruguay to study composition in the United States at the Peabody Conservatory in Baltimore under Austrian-born composer Ernst Krenek and South African composer Stefans Grové, graduating in 1967.

In 1969, Cervetti, went to Berlin to take up a one-year DAAD Artists-in-Berlin Program composer-in-residence. Whilst in Germany he received Baden-Baden commissions and wrote an a cappella work Lux Lucet In Tenebris which won a Gaudeamus International Composers Award which was premiered at the festival in Zwolle.

After 1970, Cervetti attended the Electronic Music Centre at Columbia-Princeton University where he studied under Vladimir Ussachevsky and Mario Davidovsky.

Whilst in New York, he taught for 25 years at the Tisch School of the Arts having started his tenure in 1972. As Master Teacher of Music he tutored in music history, composition and historic dance.

== Selected works ==
=== Chamber ===
- Five episodes for violin, cello and piano (1965) (Cinco episodios para violín, violonchelo y piano)
- Six sequences : for dance (1966) for chamber orchestra
- Divertimento, para cuarteto de maderas (1967) for woodwind quartet
- Zinctum (1969) for string quartet
- Dies tenebrarum (1968) for electric organ, percussion, choir and strings
- Prisons No. 1 (1969) for dancers, musicians, singers and pantomime
- Pulsar (1969) for brass sextet
- Cuatro fragmentos de Pablo Neruda (1970) for soprano, oboe, violoncello and percussion
- Peripetia (1970) for voices and musicians
- Cocktail Party (1970) work for music-theatre
- Lux Lucet in Tenebris ("and the light shineth in the darkness") (1970) for a cappella voices
- Plexus (1971) for chamber orchestra
- Raga I (1971) for ensemble
- ...de la tierra... (...from the earth...) (1972) for ensemble
- Concerto for Trumpet and Strings (1974), reorchestrated 2015
- Duelle (1974) concerto for cor anglais and string bass
- Madrigal III (1976) for two sopranos and small ensemble
- Ines de Castro (1988) ballet
- The Triumph of Death (El Triunfo de la Muerte) (1993) mezzo-soprano and piano; Text: Circe Maia
- House of Blues (1995) for wind ensemble
- Nazca (2010) for string orchestra
- Toward the Abyss (2015) piano quintet
- And the Huddled Masses (2015) for clarinet and string quartet

=== Opera ===
- Elegy for a Prince (2005) opera in two acts. Libretto: Elizabeth Esris
- YUM! (2008) opera in one act for voices and chamber ensemble. Libretto: Elizabeth Esris

=== Orchestra ===
- El Carro de Heno (The Hay Wain) (1967) for chamber choir and orchestra
- Orbitas (1967) for orchestra
- Candombe II (1996) for orchestra
- Descent (2001) piano and orchestra
- Consolamentum (2016) for orchestra
- Et in Arcadia ego (2017) symphonic poem
- Fanfare: Gated Angel (2019) for orchestra

=== Solo instrument or voice ===
- Guitar Music (the Bottom of the Iceberg) (1975)
- Four Fragments of Isadora (1979) soprano; Text: Letters of Duncan and Craig
- Three Pieces for Marimba (2014)

=== Works with electronics or tape ===
- Studies in Silence (1968) for electronics
- Oulom for tape, in 1970
- Graffiti (1971) for spoken chorus, orchestra and tape
- Prisons No. 2 (1970-–71) for spoken choir, orchestra and tape
- Raga II (1971) for trombone and tape
- Raga III (1971) for tape
- Stella Vindemiatrix (1975) for oboe and pre-recorded oboe
- Bits & pieces and Moving Parts (1977) for tape
- El Rio de los Pajaros Pintados (1979) for bandoneon and tape
- Something Borrowed, Something Blue (1979–1980) for tape

== Discography ==
- 1987 – The Hay Wain, Sergio Cervetti. (Periodic Music: PE-1631)
- 1998 – New Music for Orchestra, Moravian Philharmonic Orchestra, cond. Jiri Mikula. (Vienna Modern Masters: VMM 3045)
- 2011 – From East to West, Music from Ukraine to Uruguay, Lithuanian Music Academy Chamber Choir. (Vienna Modern Masters: VMM2030)
- 2012 – Nazca and Other Works Moravian Philharmonic Orchestra, Moravian Philharmonic Chamber Players, Vit Micka, cond. Petr Vronský. (Navona Records: NV5872)
- 2015 – Las Indias Olvidadas (The Forgotten Indies) (Nibius: NIBI 118)
- 2017 – Sunset at Noon (Six Works In Memory Of), Vít Muzík, María Teresa Chenlo, cond. Enrique Pérez Mesa, Kühn Choir of Prague, cond. Marek Vorlicek. (Navona: NV6072)
- 2016 – Pursuing Freedom, UNC Percussion Ensemble, Juan Álamo. (Albany Records: TROY1650)
- 2020 – Mortal Dreams: Four Vocal Works Sergio Cervetti, Cara Latham, Charles Abramovic. (Navona Records: NV6313)
- 2022 – Sparks : Eye of London, London Symphony Orchestra, cond. Miran Vaupotić. (Navona: 4385947)
