= Nicholas Anthony Ascioti =

American composer (born 1974)

- Born: Nicholas Anthony Ascioti; May 30, 1974 (age 51); Syracuse, New York, United States
- Origin: United States
- Genres: Contemporary classical, Choral, Chamber
- Occupations: Composer, Conductor
- Years active: 1990s–present
- Labels: Albany Records, Parma Recordings, Navona Records

Nicholas Anthony Ascioti (born May 30, 1974) is an American composer.

== Biography ==
Nicholas Anthony Ascioti was born in Syracuse, New York, on May 30, 1974. He attended the College of St. Rose in Albany, New York, where he graduated in Composition and Conducting. Since then, the College of Saint Rose has performed his music and sponsored an entire evening of his works. He earned his Master of Fine Arts degree in Composition, from Bennington College in Vermont. Many of his works, such as Credo (song cycle for voice and guitar), Four Memories (for piano and chamber orchestra) and String Quartet no. 2 have received premiere performances at Bennington College.

In October 2006 Ascioti released his debut CD, Creation's Voice, on the Albany Records label. Ascioti has received commissions from conductor David Allen Miller, of the Albany Symphony Orchestra, the Society for New Music and the Schoharie Concert Band. Nicholas focuses on chamber music, song cycles, and choral works. His piano music has received performances throughout the United States and Canada by Justin Kolb. His chamber works have been performed by sopranos Eileen Strempel & Nancy Loesch, tenor Alex Diaz, pianists Sylvie Beaudette and Amy Dissanayake, guitarist Christopher Ladd, and internationally recognized organists Maria Helena and Stephen Tharp. Ensembles include the Hyperion String Quartet, Adirondack Saxophone Quartet, Musicians of Ma'awlyck, Arcadia Brass Ensemble, The College of St. Rose Chamber Singers (under the direction of Robert Sheehan), The Bennington Contemporary Ensemble, and the Society for New Music. Nicholas has been a guest and his music is frequently heard on the Fresh Ink radio program on WCNY-FM. Nicholas was a composer-in-residence with the Society for New Music in Syracuse, where he participated in the "Composer in the Schools Program". As a conductor, Nicholas focuses on performances of the 20th century choral repertoire and as a concert promoter he oversees the Concert Series at St. Jude the Apostle Church. Nicholas currently lives in West Sand Lake, NY with his wife Emily and daughters Melody and Noelle. He serves as the Director of Music at St. Jude the Apostle Church and the St. Jude the Apostle School.

== Reviews ==
Released on March 26, 2013 by Parma Recordings, Moto Perpetuo features Ascioti's Adirondack Meditations among the selections for cello.

Rory Cooper, a spokesperson for Parma, said that Ascioti's "... piece was selected for the Moto Perpetuo project because the music highlights the full expressive and functional range of the cello as instrument. The music oscillates from energetic, to violent, from lighthearted to introspective, with the cello working at times as a lead voice or a willing accompanist to the violin and piano. The goal of this project was to present a program that shows the listener the versatility of the cello in contemporary composition. 'Adirondack Meditations' was a perfect fit."

In late 2015, Moto Continuo, released under the Navona imprint, was reviewed by David W. Moore for the American Record Guide, where Ascioti's Adirondack Tableau was described as being "in an entertainingly light mood".

== Creation's Voice ==
Ascioti's debut CD Creation's Voice was released in 2006 on the Albany Records Label. This CD features five song cycles Nicholas composed between 1999 and 2005. Credo (1999) is a set of prayers composed for tenor and guitar, Natural Questions (2004) has a text written by Richard Hibbert composed for soprano, flute, and piano, One Child's Life (2004) also has a text by Hibbert was composed for tenor and cello, Music of the Spheres (2005) again a text by Hibbert is composed for tenor, oboe, and harp, and Four Settings of Margaret Atwood is a set of songs composed for soprano and piano with a text by Canadian poet Margaret Atwood. Musicians on the CD include: Eileen Strempel, soprano, Mark Lawrence, tenor, Kenneth Myer, guitar, Christopher Dranchek, flute, Patricia DeAngelis, piano, George Macero, cello, John Lathwell, oboe, Karlinda Caldicott, harp, and Sylvie Beaudette, piano.
