= PARMA Recordings =

American record label

- Founded: 2008
- Founder: Bob Lord
- Genre: Contemporary classical; Jazz; Progressive; Experimental
- Country of origin: United States
- Location: North Hampton, New Hampshire
- Official website: www.parmarecordings.com

PARMA Recordings is a record label founded by CEO Bob Lord in 2008 and based in North Hampton, New Hampshire. It is one of the leading recording companies specializing in contemporary classical music and has been recognized by the bestowing of The American Prize for outstanding services to the arts particularly through the promotion of American music. Under the parent recording company, there are seven labels: Big Round Records, Navona Records, Ravello Records, Ansonica Records, Capstone Records, Albany Records and more recently MSR Classics. The range of music recorded across the seven imprints covers contemporary classical "orchestral and chamber, jazz, progressive and experimental music". From the start, the record company's ethos emerged from the identified need to have a "top-quality, artist-focused contemporary classical music production company".

The releases are in both physical format (compact disc and vinyl) and digital, with compact discs usually including enhanced CD data content that incorporates study scores in digital format, photography from the recording sessions, video footage and composer interviews. In recent years, the album releases have tended to be mostly in digital format.

== Recording abroad ==
From the outset, the audio production house favored Central Europe, and Eastern Europe in particular, as their preferred recording locations. This was mainly due to the level of musicianship found in players mostly being members and former members of radio orchestras, who were already active in performing and recording new music. The European orchestras' economic situation being largely free from the private donor funding more common in the United States is also a factor and helps widen the repertoire being considered. The preferred European locations include Reduta Hall in Olomouc, Czech Republic, and since 2016, the Zagreb Academy of Music in Croatia.

In May 2015, CEO Bob Lord visited Havana, Cuba, to look into whether the location was suitable for recording and producing music in a way that was compatible with the company's ethos. Following the successful visit, PARMA went ahead with the initiative and recorded on location in Havana for the first time in late 2015, with the recording sessions producing Abrazo: The Havana Sessions, the first album to be released on the Ansonica imprint.

In March 2025, PARMA Recordings took over the management of the historically established classical music recording venue, Studio Martínek, in Prague. The first recording project to take place under the studio's new management featured the Kühn Choir of Prague recording an a cappella choral work by American composer Jay Anthony Gach.

=== Orchestras and ensembles ===
Several prominent orchestras feature among the many musicians and ensembles that have collaborated with PARMA Recordings, specifically, the Royal Scottish National Orchestra and the London Symphony Orchestra. The main orchestras involved in numerous recording sessions with PARMA are the Moravian Philharmonic Orchestra and the Janáček Philharmonic Ostrava. Croatia, Zagreb Festival Orchestra, has featured in PARMA projects such as the recording of Dan Brown's Wild Symphony, a children's book with an accompanying orchestral soundtrack. The Brno Contemporary Orchestra, formed in 2011, has recorded 23 albums on the Navona imprint. The Bratislava Symphony Orchestra recorded with conductor Anthony Armoré in 2021 for the Navona symphonic series Symphonies No. 4 & 5 - Meditation: In Flanders Fields (NV6325).

Since 2015, Trio Casals, (currently made up of Ovidiu Marinescu, cello; Timothy Schwarz, violin; Mădălina-Claudia Dănilă, piano), have been recording and performing with PARMA and the Navona Records label. On May 12, 2015, the trio made their debut performance at the prestigious venue, Weill Recital Hall, Carnegie where they performed works by contemporary composers Nicholas Anthony Ascioti, John A. Carollo, Robert Fleisher, Diane Jones, Brian Noyes and Osias Wilenski. Following the concert, Moto Continuo, the trio's first release under the Navona imprint, was launched featuring the works of the same six composers. By December 2020, Trio Casals had given 20 concerts in conjunction with the "MOTO" album and concert series.

The Kühn Choir of Prague (Czech: Kühnův smíšený sbor), founded in 1959, has recorded in collaboration with PARMA, working with large orchestras and delivering the first renderings of contemporary choral music on projects since mid-2012. Their first album to be released was Seeking & Finding (NV5877) with the music of composers Hans Bakker and Howard Richards, and have since featured on another 11 Navona albums. In January 2025, the choir recorded Jay Anthony Gach's HaShir HaShem Luchem for the follow-up album Celestial Voices 2.

=== Conductors ===
Petr Vronský, conductor of the Moravian Philharmonic from 2005 to 2018, has conducted and recorded numerous works which were subsequently released on 49 separate albums with PARMA, many of which are on regular playlists of radio stations around the world. As of January 2021, Uruguayan composer Sergio Cervetti has featured on eleven Navona Records releases, four of which (Nazca, Parallel Realms, Triptych Revelation, and Mortal Dreams) included compositions conducted by Maestro Vronský.

Czech conductor Vit Micka, has recorded at least 25 albums with PARMA Recordings usually conducting the Moravian Philharmonic Orchestra. Albums include the 2011 release, Light and Shadow (NV5847), which has received repeat radio broadcasts, and another 2011 release, Zeichen (NV5839) by German composer Gerhard Stäbler, was also conducted by Vit Micka.

Kirk Trevor, conducting the Slovak National Philharmonic Orchestra and the Slovak Radio Symphony Orchestra has recorded albums on the Navona Records imprint. The 2009 album Music of Copland & McKinley (NV5812) with clarinetist Richard Stoltzman and the 2015 album Lee Actor: Piano Concerto (NV5986) both featured the Slovak National Symphony Orchestra under Trevor.

John Page, former conductor of the BBC Ulster Orchestra and the National Symphony Orchestra of Ireland and co-founder of the PARMA Orchestra, has recorded works that have been released on 29 Navona Records albums, including with the Portsmouth Symphony Orchestra.

Czech conductor and composer Pavel Šnajdr has recorded at least 13 Navona imprint releases, in particular, Symphonic Chronicles Vol II, Symphonic Chronicles Vol III, Dimensions Vol. 4 - Works for Orchestra and My Country.

== Milestones ==
In 2013, the audio production company celebrated the release of its 150th album. Another significant milestone was reached in October 2022 when Navona Records, under the PARMA umbrella, released their 1000th album "Amplify".

=== Imprints and acquisitions ===
In 2008, PARMA Recordings acquired the New York-based classical label, Capstone Records, founded by composer Richard Brooks. It was agreed in 2009 that the acquired label would be run as an imprint and that the founder would sit on the board in an advisory capacity. Also in 2009, Big Round Records, previously owned by Congressman Paul Hodes, was brought into the PARMA Recordings family. In 2011, MMC Recordings was acquired along with "ThatNewMusicLibrary", the internet music publisher.

In April 2024, the parent recording company acquired Albany Records along with its complete catalog.

In late January 2026, the classical label MSR Classics was acquired by PARMA, adding nearly 800 commercial releases to the overall PARMA family catalog. MSR Classics, specializing in orchestral, chamber, and choral repertoire, was founded in 1998 by music producer and sound engineer Robert LaPorta who has been retained by PARMA as Artistic Advisor during the transition period.

== Radio airplay ==
Recorded music from the overall catalog has been broadcast on radio stations both in the United States and internationally.

Works from the 2012 Navona Records release, Dimensions – Works for String Orchestra, have been played on BBC Radio 3, Barcelona's Catalunya Ràdio, Canada's Radio–Classique CJSQ-FM, New Jersey's WPRB 103.3 fm, South Africa's Classic FM 102.7 and Sweden's P2 Klassiskt.

Gerald Cohen's “Sea of Reeds”, a Navona Records release (NV5979), featured on Classical KING Second Inversion's "Album of the Week" on January 12, 2015.

Sergio Cervetti's Nazca, with the Moravian Philharmonic Orchestra, received airplay on New York Public Radio's WNYC in December 2016. On April 01, 2025, the station also broadcast Rebecca Oswald's Sleep, Child from the Navona album: Light and Shadow: Modern Orchestral Works.

Pianist Liza Stepanova's solo album of 2020, E Pluribus Unum (NV6300), featuring 8 composers, has been widely broadcast on national and international radio. Tracks from the album have been broadcast on Australia's ABC Classic Drive on May 31, 2023, on Canada's CBC public radio "Album of the Week" and on Classical Discoveries with Marvin Rosen on August 26, 2020.

In November 2021, PARMA Recordings became a sponsor and partner in All Classical Radio's Recording Inclusivity Initiative, set up in January 2021 to promote America's classical music playlist by recording, releasing, and distributing high-quality recordings of classical works by underrepresented composers. The Navona Records album Amplify was the first instalment under the collaboration with the Portland public radio station's RII. It was followed by volume 2 of the RII, Elevate, in May 2024.

== See also ==
- List of record labels
