= Robert Black (conductor) =

American conductor, pianist and composer

Robert Carlisle Black (April 28, 1950 – November 14, 1993) was an American conductor, pianist and composer. He was most particularly associated with the promotion, performance and recording of contemporary classical music, but he also played and conducted the standard repertoire.

== Life ==
Robert Black was born in Dallas, Texas in 1950. The pianist William Black (1952–2003) was his brother. He started his piano studies at age 5, presenting his first public recital at 13. He studied at Oberlin College and the Juilliard School in New York, where his teachers included Beveridge Webster, Roger Sessions and David Diamond. He taught at Oberlin, Stanford University, Long Island University (C. W. Post Campus), Princeton University and the University of California, Santa Barbara.

His early recording of works by Franz Liszt was nominated by the Franz Liszt Academy of Music in Budapest for a Grand Prix du Disque.

He founded the New York New Music Ensemble in 1975, was a member of Speculum Musicae from 1978, and founded the Prism Chamber Orchestra in 1983. He was music director of the New Amsterdam Symphony Orchestra from 1987 to 1993. In 1992 he was appointed Principal Conductor and artistic director of the Kuopio Symphony Orchestra in Kuopio, Finland. Other orchestras he conducted or recorded with included the Warsaw Philharmonic, the Slovak Radio Symphony Orchestra, and the Silesian Philharmonic.

As a conductor, he was as much involved with the standard orchestral repertory as with new music. He conducted performance of Beethoven's Ninth Symphony at New York's Cathedral of St. John the Divine, a cycle of symphonies by Mahler, and conducted Mozart piano concertos from the keyboard.

Among the hundreds of works his new music groups premiered were Ralph Shapey's Three for Six, Joseph Schwantner's Music of Amber, Dane Rudhyar's Epic Poem, and works by Elliott Carter, Jacob Druckman, Jean Barraqué and Harrison Birtwistle.

He appeared at the Bang on a Can Festival in New York, the New York Philharmonic's Horizons Festival, the Warsaw Autumn Festival, the ISCM's World Music Days in Athens, the New England Conservatory Jazz Festival, the Grand Teton Festival, and the LSU Contemporary Music Festival.

His recordings include: Elliott Carter's In Sleep, in Thunder, Ralph Shapey's Radical Traditionalism, Schoenberg's Pierrot Lunaire with Phyllis Bryn-Julson, Stravinsky's Dumbarton Oaks Concerto, Tod Machover's Nature's Breath and Towards the Centre, Miriam Gideon's Five Sonnets From Shakespeare and Symphonica brevis Louise Talma's Full Circle, Charles Wuorinen's New York Notes, William Thomas McKinley's Boston Overture, Jonathan Feist's Fog of Clusters, Stephen Jaffe's The Rhythm of the Running Plough, Stephen Dembski's Spectra, Joseph Koykkar's Composite, Maxine Warshauer's Revelation, Mitch Hampton's Three Minute Waltz, Paul Renz's Symphonic Poem, David Macbride's Nocturnos de la ventana and works by Beethoven, Roger Sessions and John Cage.

Robert Black came to serious composition very late in his life. His works were particularly influenced by Charles Wuorinen and Ralph Shapey, and include Underground Judges, Three Pieces for Violin and Piano, later reworked as the orchestral work Capriccio (Blown Apart), and Earth Fire, for viola and piano. His sole piece for solo piano was Foramen Habet!, dedicated to Beveridge Webster. A recording titled "The Art of Robert Black" includes several of his works.

Robert Black died of melanoma in Palo Alto, California, on November 14, 1993, aged 43, survived by his wife, parents and two siblings.

== Sources ==
- allmusic
- Bridge Records
- Classical Archives
