= Kalmen Opperman =

American clarinetist

Kalmen Opperman (December 8, 1919 – June 18, 2010) was an American clarinetist. He was a performer, teacher, conductor, mouthpiece and barrel maker, composer, and writer of numerous clarinet studies.

== Education ==
He was born in Manhattan, and grew up with his family in Spring Valley, New York. He studied with clarinetists Ralph McLane and Simeon Bellison of the Philadelphia Orchestra and New York Philharmonic.

== Career ==
For many years Opperman was a performer in Broadway shows. He taught at Boston University, Hartt School of Music, Indiana University, and privately. Many of his students are currently working as soloists, recording artists, orchestral players and university teachers. Richard Stoltzman was one of his students. He wrote study books for the clarinet including his multi-volume Daily Studies and Velocity Studies. He led the Kalmen Opperman clarinet choir. He made mouthpieces and barrels.
