= Steven Graff =

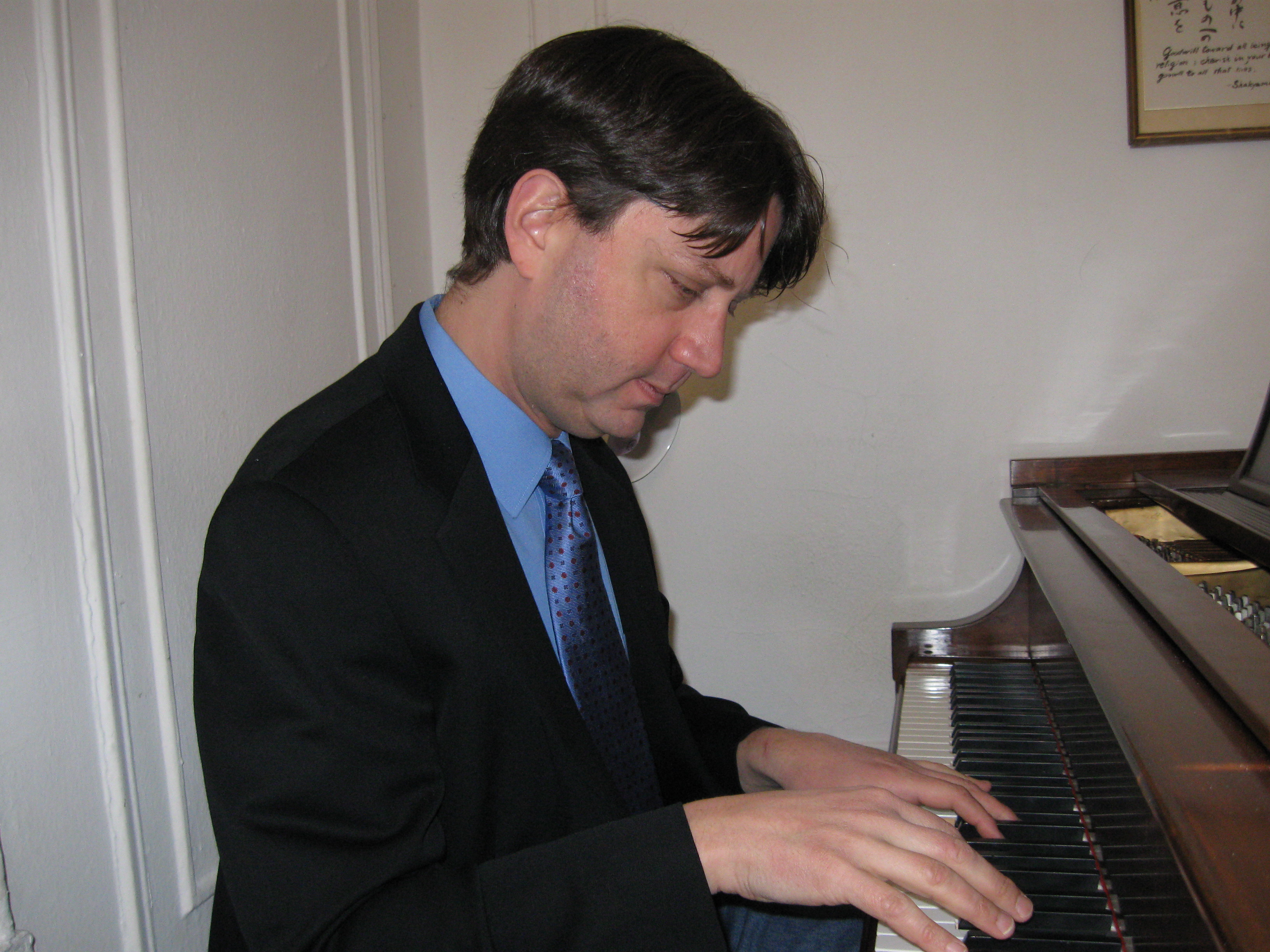

Background information
- Born: Chicago, Illinois
- Genres: Classical
- Occupations: Pianist, Professor
- Instrument: Piano
- Years active: 1984–present
- Website: http://stevenlgraff.com

Steven Lewis Graff is a pianist and teacher of music in Spartanburg, South Carolina.

== Early years and education ==
Bill Clinton congratulates Steven Graff after a piano performance.

Steven Graff was born in Chicago where he studied piano with the late Eloise Niwa and made his debut as a soloist with The Chicago Symphony Orchestra. He went on to study at The Juilliard School as a Petschek Scholarship student, where his teachers included Adele Marcus, Beveridge Webster and Herbert Stessin. He received a Doctorate of Musical Arts from The Graduate School of CUNY, with a doctoral thesis entitled Chopin performance tradition and its relationship to analysis. In 1986 he was a winner of the Juilliard School's eighth annual Gina Bachauer International Piano Scholarship Competition.

== Performer ==
Steven Graff has toured Norway, Japan and throughout the United States and Europe. He was a prizewinner in The Casadesus and Stravinsky International Competitions. He has given performances at Zankel, Weill and Stern Auditoriums at Carnegie Hall, and the Kaye Playhouse and Lang Hall at Hunter College, Alice Tully Hall and Merkin Hall in New York City, and his performances have been broadcast on New York radio stations WQXR and WNCN, and Chicago's WFMT. Graff has premiered new music and recorded contemporary works on the Centaur Records and Capstone Records Labels. Solo Concerto performances include the Hunter Symphony, The University of Arizona Orchestra at Flagstaff, The New York Symphonic Arts Ensemble, The Chicago Symphony Orchestra, The Chicago Chamber Orchestra, The Skokie Valley Symphony and The Northshore Philharmonia. He has given lecture/recitals at The Gina Bachauer International Piano Foundation and at The Aloha International Piano Festival in Hawaii. Steven Graff is a Steinway Artist.

== Teacher ==
Dr. Graff served on the faculty at New York's Hunter College and at The Macaulay Honors College of The City University of New York. In fall 2020 he joined the faculty of the Petrie School of Music at Converse University in Spartanburg, South Carolina, as a full-time Professor of Piano.
