= Dreadnaught USA =

American experimental rock group

Dreadnaught is a New Hampshire, United States of America (United States)-based experimental rock group that has released 7 full-length albums since its formation in 1996. The band's sound is distinguished by acrobatic, intricate compositional and instrumental interplay coupled with a down-to-earth, wry approach to performance.

== History ==
Formed in 1996 at the University of New Hampshire in Durham, Dreadnaught regularly toured the Northeast United States through the recording of its first two albums, Dreadnaught (1998) and Una Vez Mas (2000). Both releases featured vocal-oriented roots-rock interspersed with progressive, art rock, and jazz elements; during this period, the band's live shows were marked by aggressive, energetic instrumental improvisation and increasingly sophisticated musical structures.

By the time of the recording of 2001's The American Standard (Red Fez Records), the band (now a trio consisting of bassist Bob Lord, guitarist Justin Walton, and drummer Rick Habib) was touring nationally and had become more radical in composition and performance; The American Standard presented classical and jazz influenced multi-movement suites, quirky pop songs, and avant-garde metal instrumentals with augmented orchestration, including strings, brass, and winds. Critical response to the album was widespread and enthusiastic, exposing European, Eurasian, and South American audiences to the band for the first time and landing the group on numerous 'best of' listings.

After three years of steady touring and performance in support of The American Standard, Dreadnaught released the highly experimental Musica En Flagrante (Big Balloon Music/Red Fez) in 2004. Reflecting Lord's ongoing active work in film scoring and custom audio, Flagrante was an entirely instrumental set of pieces featuring widely expanded instrumentation and recording techniques in addition to the debut of drummer Tim Haney (previously and subsequently a member of SeepeopleS).

The double-disc album Live At Mojo arrived in 2005 from the Italian label Comet Records and received a 4-star review from Allmusic upon release; the album was recorded live in the studio in late 2003 at the end of a national tour by Lord, Walton, and Haney, and features cuts not heard on any other Dreadnaught recordings, including cover tunes by Warren Zevon, Dick Curless, Frank Zappa, and John Entwistle. In 2005, Habib returned to the fold, and Lord released his first solo set, Audio For Film TV & Games (Red Fez), a collection of cuts culled from the bassist's visual media projects.

Dreadnaught worked steadily in the studio during 2006 to record new material with longtime engineer Shaun Frenchie Michaud, this time blending the musical extremity of prior sessions with a return to a more vocal-based style. Throughout the year the group also recorded music composed by Lord for film (The Elevator Chaser for OxRock Productions) and radio (The Exchange for NHPR), and in early 2007 re-recorded The Who's Going Mobile for a national marketing campaign.

In 2007, HIGH HEAT & CHIN MUSIC: 10 YEARS OF DREADNAUGHT, a double-disc retrospective featuring 2006's new studio tracks along with tracks from each of the band's prior albums, was released by Big Balloon/Red Fez to glowing reviews and critical acclaim.

In the autumn of 2012 Dreadnaught was invited to perform at the legendary Progday festival in Chapel Hill NC, and serendipitously landed the prestigious Sunday morning "church" slot. This now near-mythical performance, by the lineup that recorded the classic The American Standard, was rewarded with a thunderous standing ovation. Response to their performance was so enthusiastic they were invited back to play the Friday Progday pre-show in 2013.

The fall of 2013 saw the release of new material from the trio in the form of an EP entitled Have A Drink With Dreadnaught, and early 2015 saw the release of another EP titled Gettin' Tight With Dreadnaught. Both EPs were received rapturously by fans of the band on social media, as well as receiving uniformly positive critical reviews.

2011 brought the release of Justin Walton's first solo album It Takes A Toll, which was a solo album in every sense of the word. Walton wrote, engineered, sang, and played all the instruments on every track. Unlike some musicians who attempt this approach, Walton shows himself to be an accomplished player on an array of instruments, and an excellent studio engineer. Justin released his second solo disc in 2015, Blood From A Stone. Of course, a huge feature of both albums is Walton's top-shelf, fluid guitar work, as well as his warm, enticing vocals.

While Walton was busy working solo, Lord and Habib formed a side-project trio with guitarist John McCormack, and released a disc in October 2016 under the moniker "Order Of Thieves". The songs contain many of the trademark elements of the Dreadnaught sound, but McCormack puts his own unique stamp on each of the tracks, mainly through a seemly endless fountain of heavy, gargantuan-sounding riffs. The band describes the album as 'power prog', which is certainly on target.

Dreeadnaught's new full-length CD "HARD CHARGIN" was released in mid-June 2017. While easily the most challenging, envelope-pushing music the band has ever put to tape, reception of the disc from the group's fanbase has been uniformly enthusiastic. Critical reviews in magazines, online music sites, and blog sites have been unanimously positive. Rave reviews appeared in Expose' Online and Stereo Embers Magazine, and Progression Magazine gave it a 4-out-of-5 star rating.

Dreadnaught have performed several shows in the New England area since the new album's release. At the most recent performance they performed "HARD CHARGIN" in its entirety. The band is not taking their renewed energy or excitement from old and new fans for granted. They are reportedly already at work on their next album, and hope to perform more shows in 2018 as their schedules allow.

== Performances ==
Dreadnaught has received attention for energetic, humorous, and virtuosic performances that are musically diverse and, at times, highly unorthodox. In addition to its solo tours, the band has served as opening act for John Entwistle (The Who), Tony Levin (Peter Gabriel, King Crimson), NRBQ, Jim Weider (The Band), California Guitar Trio, and the Young Dubliners.

In 2005, the group began a prominent stint as house band for the New Hampshire Public Radio series Writers On A New England Stage at the Music Hall in Portsmouth NH, where it has performed with Dan Brown (The Da Vinci Code), Alan Alda, Doris Kearns Goodwin, John Updike, Elmore Leonard, Anita Diamant, and Mitch Albom. The series has attracted international coverage and has been featured in press outlets such as The Today Show and Good Morning America; the 2007 season includes Pulitzer Prize winner Richard Russo and renowned documentary filmmaker Ken Burns.

== Full-Length Releases ==
- HARD CHARGIN' (2017, Red Fez Records)
- High Heat & Chin Music: 10 Years Of Dreadnaught (2007, 2CD, Big Balloon Music/Red Fez Records)
- Live At Mojo (2005, 2CD, Comet Records/Horizons)
- Musica En Flagrante (2004, Big Balloon Music/Red Fez Records)
- The American Standard (2001, Red Fez Records)
- Una Vez Mas (2000)
- Dreadnaught (1998)

== EPs ==
- Gettin' Tight With Dreadnaught (2015, Red Fez Records)
- Have A Drink With Dreadnaught (2013, Red Fez Records)
- Pucka Pucka With Dreadnaught (2006, Red Fez Records, internet-only)
- Dreadnaught Live (2000, Red Fez Records)
- Dreadnaught EP (1996)

== Reissues ==
- Musica En Flagrante (2004, Big Balloon Music/Red Fez Records; 2006 reissue in Baltic states by MALS label)
- The American Standard (2001, Red Fez Records; 2006 reissue in Baltic states by MALS label; 2013 reissue by Red Fez Records)

== Select Additional Appearances ==
- The Exchange (2007, theme song for NHPR program)
- Going Mobile (2007, re-record of The Who's track for Hot Diggity/Innov-x marketing campaign)
- Wander (Bob Lord, 2006, short film, Wander Films)
- Flying Downhill (2005, feature documentary on Bode Miller, Coruway Film Institute)
- Marilyn's Man (Bob Lord, 2005, feature documentary on Marilyn Monroe, Universal/Valhalla)
- Apples & Oranges Compilation (2004, Various Artists, Red Fez Records)

== Current members ==
- Bob Lord (1996–present)
- Justin Walton (1999–present)
- Rick Habib (1996–2002, 2005–present)

== Former members ==
- Tim Haney (2002–2005)
- Ethan Bessey (1996–2001)
- Nick Trippi (1996–2001)
- Ed Jurdi (1996–1997)
- Ryan Thomas (1996–1997)

== Affiliated Musicians ==
- Shaun Frenchie Michaud (engineer)
- Andy Happel (violin, engineer)
- Duncan Watt (keys, engineer)
- Tom Yoder (violin)
- Don Rondo (inspiration)
- Greg Robinson (Meow Mix)
- Jon McCormack (Order Of Thieves)
- Nick (from Manchester)
- Chris Walken (King of New York)
- Daryl Hammond (Jesse Jackson)
- Jesse Jackson (Daryl Hammond)
- Fred Flintstone (in dat house)
- Dat cat (out dat house)
- NH Gents (death punch)
- Big Lip (residential advisor)
- Tin Palace (Grateful Dead)
- Mike Mondeux (carpenter)
- JPs Eatery (steak tips)
- Brian Gorman (lighter inventory manager)
