= Elliott Miles McKinley =

American classical composer

Elliott Miles McKinley (born April 23, 1969) is an American composer, improviser, and teacher. He is currently Professor of Music Composition and Theory, and department Chair of Performing and Creative Arts at Roger Williams University in Rhode Island, and director of the Alba Music Festival Composition Program in Italy. His father is the late American composer and jazz pianist William Thomas McKinley, who gave Elliott the middle name Miles in honor of Miles Davis.

== Life and work ==
Born in New Haven, Connecticut, McKinley received a Bachelor of Music degree in jazz studies and composition from New England Conservatory of Music a Master of Music degree in composition from the University of Michigan, and a Ph.D. from the University of Minnesota. His teachers include John McNeil in jazz performance studies, and composers Thomas Oboe Lee, Malcolm Peyton, George Balch Wilson, Alex Lubet, Douglas Geers, David Gompper, Michael Daugherty, and William Bolcom.

As of 2020, his catalog of work numbers just over 70, and his music has been described as inspired by jazz and yet "thoroughly self-assured as he twists and bends the orchestral idiom into exciting new shapes." In a review of his string quartets, the reviewer states that "...the strength of McKinley's music lies in his lively rhythms and elastic melodies, and these impressive works show a composer mastering his medium with consummate craft and a fertile, almost improvisational, imagination." New Music Box's Frank Oteri has noted "...rhythms are invariably skewed into something extraordinary." In general, his music is marked by an economy of expression that may be founded on the works by Anton Webern and other miniaturists, though McKinley's musical grammar is not in a dodecaphonic idiom.

McKinley is the recipient of commissions from the Pittsburgh New Music Ensemble, the SOLI Chamber Music Ensemble, the Czech Philharmonic Chamber Music Society, the Duquesne University Contemporary Ensemble, the Martinů String Quartet, the Janàček Trio, Hub New Music, and Transient Canvas. His orchestral music has been performed by the Minnesota Orchestra, the Warsaw Philharmonic, the Czech Radio Symphony, and his music has been featured on international festivals including the BGSU Contemporary Music Festival, the Indiana State University New Music Festival, and the University of Minnesota SPARK Festival. Among awards, grants, and fellowships are ones from BMI (Broadcast Music Inc.), New Music USA the American Composers Forum, and Indiana University. McKinley is also active as a performer and improviser, and founding member of the electroacoustic improvisation ensemble, earWorm.

== Major works ==
- April - a meditation for orchestra (1994)
- Symphony for Four Players (1996) for clarinet, violin, violoncello, and piano
- String Quartet No. 4 (2001)
- String Quartet No. 5 (2005)
- Three Symphonic Moods (2010)
- Four Grooves (2012) for percussion solo, two pianos, and saxophone quartet
- String Quartet No. 7 (2014)
- Six Movements for Brass Quintet (2015)
- String Quartet No. 8 (2016)
- Piano Trio No. 1 "The Shadow Dancer" (2018)
