= Nevsky String Quartet =

Russian musical ensemble

Nevsky String Quartet (Quinten Quartet, until 1998) is a string quartet based in St. Petersburg, Russia. They are noted for their award-winning performances of Russian music and their performances of contemporary music.

== History and Repertoire ==
The Quartet, originally named the Quinten-Quartet, was founded in 1995 by students of St. Petersburg Conservatory with intensive assistance of Gleb Nikitin (dean of Orchestral Department). The idea of creation belonged to Vladimir Bistritsky (viola player). Other members of Quartet became 3-year students: Tatiana Razoumova (1st violin) and Dmitry Khrytchev (cello). Last member became 2nd violinist Dmitry Korjavko, 1st-year student.
In addition to their schooling in Russia, they also studied in London, in Germany, and with members of the Prague String Quartet, the Alban Berg Quartet, and the Amadeus Quartet in Austria.

The membership of the quartet has changed slightly since the Quartet's founding in 1995. The members are:

Period	1st violin	2nd violin	Viola	Violoncello
1995–1997	Tatiana Razoumova	Dmitry Korjavko	Vladimir Bistritsky	Dmitry Khrytchev
1997	Tatiana Razoumova	Vladislav Pessin & Svetlana Greenfeld	Vladimir Bistritsky	Dmitry Khrytchev
1997–2001	Tatiana Razoumova	Anna Tchijik	Vladimir Bistritsky	Dmitry Khrytchev
2002–2007	Tatiana Razoumova	Svetlana Greenfeld	Vladimir Bistritsky	Dmitry Khrytchev
2007	Tatiana Razoumova	Alexei Maslov	Vladimir Bistritsky	Dmitry Khrytchev
2007–	Tatiana Razoumova	Svetlana Greenfeld	Vladimir Bistritsky	Dmitry Khrytchev
2012–	Anna Tchijik	Svetlana Greenfeld	Vladimir Bistritsky	Dmitry Khrytchev
2012–2013	Anna Tchijik	Svetlana Greenfeld	Vladimir Bistritsky	Victor Kustov
2013–2016	Anna Tchijik	Svetlana Greenfeld	Vladimir Bistritsky	Vsevolod Dolganov
2016-	Natalia Andreeva	Svetlana Greenfeld	Vladimir Bistritsky	Ruslan Nabiyev

Svetlana Greenfeld performed on the Northern Flowers label recording, and Alexei Maslov performed on one of the Capstone recordings.

The Quartet’s repertoire includes an emphasis on the music of Haydn (their original name—Quinten-Quartet—refers to one of Haydn’s works, the Opus 76, No 2 Quartet in d minor), Russian composers, particularly Tchaikovsky and Shostakovich, as well as music of contemporary composers, such as Rodney Waschka II, whose quartets they have premiered and recorded on Capstone Records.

== Awards ==
In 1996, at the IV International Shostakovich String Quartets Competition, the Quartet received the Third Prize and the Special Prize for the best performance of Russian music (the Second Quartet by Prokofiev). In 1997, at the III International Competition "Franz Schubert and Music of XX Century", the Quartet won the Second Prize and the Special Prize for the best performance of composition by Franz Schubert (String Quartet "Death and the Maiden"). At the 6th Karl-Klingler String Quartet Competition in Berlin (Germany), they won the Barenreiter-Prize for the best interpretation of string quartet compositions of Mozart and Beethoven in accordance with historical performance practice. Also in 1998, the Quartet won First Prize in the Swedish International String Quartet Competition.

== Partial discography ==
"Spirit Of Romance". Reading, MA: MMC Records (?), 2007.

- String Quartet by Gary R. Featherston
- String Serenade by Gary R. Featherston.

"Music for Strings". Brooklyn, NY: Capstone Records, CPS-8781, 2007.

- String Quartet: Laredo by Rodney Waschka II
- Ravel Remembers Fascism by Rodney Waschka II
- Six Folksongs from an Imaginary Country by Rodney Waschka II
- Xuan Men by Rodney Waschka II
- String Quartet: Ha! Fortune by Rodney Waschka II

"Beerman Unplugged Almost". Brooklyn, NY: Capstone Records, CPS-8757, 2006.

- Circle Dance by Burton Beerman,

"Haydn, Prokofiev, Shostakovich". St. Petersburg, Russia: Northern Flowers, 2005.

- Quartet for Strings in G Minor Opus 74 Number 3 (The Rider) by F.J. Haydn
- Quartet for Strings Number 1 in B Minor by Sergei Prokofiev
- Quartet for Strings Number 8 in C Minor by Dmitri Shostakovich
