= Beveridge Webster =

American pianist and educator

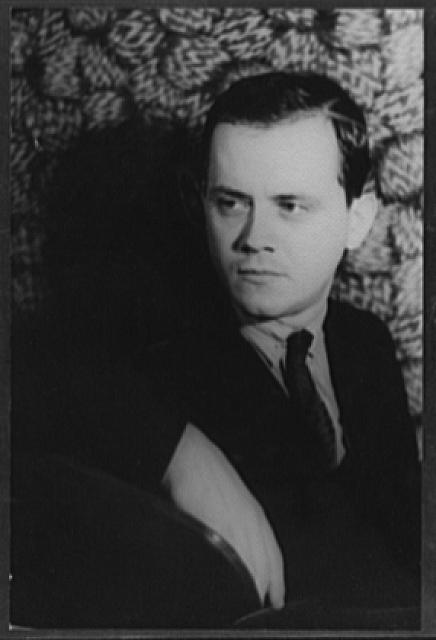
Beveridge Webster (1934). Photo by Carl Van Vechten

Beveridge Webster (May 13, 1908, in Pittsburgh, Pennsylvania – June 30, 1999, in Hanover, New Hampshire) was an American pianist and educator.

== Biography ==
Beveridge Webster initially studied with his father (also named Beveridge), who was director of the Pittsburgh Conservatory of Music. In 1921, his father became business manager of the American Conservatory in Fontainbleau, moving his family to Paris. Beveridge and his siblings thus began five years of musical study in Europe, first at the American Academy at Fontainebleau as a pupil of Robert Casadesus and Nadia Boulanger, then at the Paris Conservatory with Isidor Philipp. In 1926 he won first prize at the Paris Conservatory's piano competition. He returned annually to the American Academy through 1934. He also studied in Berlin with Artur Schnabel.

He made his New York debut in November 1934 with the New York Philharmonic performing Edward MacDowell's Piano Concerto No. 2. In 1937, he gave the New York Philharmonic premiere (on short notice, replacing Dushkin) of Stravinsky's Capriccio, under Stravinsky's baton.

Webster was best known as an interpreter of French composers, especially Maurice Ravel (whom he met in Paris as a student) and Claude Debussy. He premiered an early version of Ravel's Tzigane in 1924, and in 1975 he celebrated Ravel's centenary by performing the complete Ravel piano solo oeuvre at Juilliard. In 1968, over a three-concert series at The Town Hall, he commemorated the 50th anniversary of Debussy's death with the first complete survey of the composer's piano works in New York.

A Time magazine article from 1937 said of Webster, "Dark, well-knit, young Beveridge Webster is a good swimmer, takes pride in his tennis, likes to play poker or bridge with his great good friend Igor Stravinsky. He boasts of the little slam he once made against Sidney Lenz."

In 1937, novelist Willa Cather, who likely personally knew Webster, attended one of his recitals at New York’s Town Hall, and wrote him a brief letter praising his performance, "That was the third time I had heard you play the Schumann, and this week I thought there was a kind of larger freedom in your treatment and a careless care in shooting the rapids (a queer figure of speech, but if you’ve ever seen the Canadian canoe men shoot rapids, you will know that I mean something (not velocity) which I am unable to say in technical musical language)."

He taught at New England Conservatory from 1940 to 1946 and at the Juilliard School from 1946 to 1990. His students include Michel Block, Robert McDonald, Jahja Ling, Sylvia Glickman, Steven Graff, Toshi Ichiyanagi, and Hao Huang. Seymour Bernstein related in his autobiography that by 1966 Webster had become a disengaged teacher.

He made a substantial series of recordings issued on LP by Dover Publications and at least one, billed as the first installment in a complete traversal of Schubert's piano sonatas, for MGM Records, released as E3711.

Webster is associated with premiere performances, dedications, and first recordings of many contemporary works, including:

- Variations in C Minor, for Piano by Harold Shapero. Premiered in 1949 at a League of Composers concert held at New York's Museum of Modern Art.
- Dedicatee of the last of Louise Talma's Six Etudes for piano.
- Dedicatee of Erich Itor Kahn's Five Bagatelles.
- Dedicatee of Billy Jim Layton's Five Studies for Violin and Piano from 1957
- Dedicatee of Robert Black's only work for solo piano, Foramen Habet!
- Dedicatee of Jean Papineau-Couture's Rondo
- Other pieces by Roger Sessions, Roy Harris, Aaron Copland and Elliott Carter.

As an editor, Webster created editions of the music of:

- Chabrier's Pièces pittoresques, which consisted little more than adding fingerings to reproductions of original Enoch-Costallat prints.
- Dover's 2nd edition from 1975 of Claude Debussy: Piano Music (1888-1905), which corrected many engraving errors from the Dover reprinting of earlier Fromont editions.
