= Arnold Rosner =

American composer

Arnold Rosner (November 8, 1945 in New York City – November 8, 2013) was an American composer of classical music.

== Biography ==
Rosner got his training at State University of New York at Buffalo, New York. According to his own account, he "learned practically nothing" there.

Rosner developed an individual style that fused elements of Renaissance music with the heightened drama and rich sonorities of late romanticism. He composed three operas, eight symphonies, six string quartets, chamber music and songs. Many of his compositions were influenced by his Jewish background, but also by Catholicism. Most of his music is available on recording.

== Principal works ==
=== Operas ===
- Chronicle of Nine: The Tragedy of Queen Jane, Op. 81 (1984); libretto by Florence Stevenson
- Bontsche Schweig, Chamber Opera, Op. 102 (1994)
- Spinoza, Chamber Opera, Op. 123 (2011); libretto by the composer, including some prayers and historical documents

=== Symphonies ===
- Symphony No. 1, Op. 3 (1961)
- Symphony No. 2, Op. 8 (1961)
- Symphony No. 3, Op. 20 (1963)
- Symphony No. 4, Op. 29 (1964)
- Symphony No. 5 Missa sine Cantoribus super "Salve Regina", Op. 57 (1973)
- Symphony No. 6, Op. 64 (1976)
- Symphony No. 7 in A minor The Tragedy of Queen Jane, Op. 78 (1982); based on the opera The Chronicle of Nine, Op. 81 (1984)
- Symphony No. 8 Trinity, for Concert Band, Op. 84 (1988)

=== Concertos ===
- Piano Concerto No. 1, Op. 14 (1962)
- Violin Concerto, Op. 17 (1962)
- Piano Concerto No. 2, Op. 30 (1965)
- Five Meditations, for English Horn, Harp and Strings, Op. 36 (1967)
- A Gentle Musicke, for Flute and String orchestra, Op. 44 (1969)
- Concerto for 2 Trumpets, Strings, and Timpani, Op. 107 (1997)
- Concerto for Harpsichord and Strings, Op. 113 (2000)

=== Other symphonic works ===
- A Soldier's Prayer, Op. 7 (1961)
- Sacred Service, for SATB choir and orchestra, Op. 15 (1962)
- Cycle of Spring, Op. 23 (1963)
- Passacaglia for orchestra, Op. 24 (1963)
- Toccata Concertante, Op. 27 (1964)
- Partita for orchestra, Op. 33 (1966)
- Six Pastoral Dances, Op. 40 (1968)
- Perchance to Dream, for Orchestra (and SATB choir ad libitum), Op. 45 (1969)
- A MyLai Elegy, Op. 51 (1971)
- Requiem, Op. 59 (1973)
- Concerto Grosso No. 1, Op. 60 (1974)
- Five Ko-ans, Op. 65 (1976)
- Responses, Hosanna and Fugue, for String orchestra, Op. 67 (1977)
- Nocturne for orchestra, Op. 68 (1978)
- Concerto Grosso No. 2, Op. 74 (1979)
- Consort Music, Op. 75, version for orchestra (1980); originally written for five viole da gamba
- The Tragedy of Queen Jane, Op. 78
- From the Diaries of Adam Czerniakow, Op. 82 (1986)
- Transformations, Op. 87 (1990)
- Gematria, Op. 93 (1991)
- A Sephardic Rhapsody, Op. 95 (1992)
- Variations on a Theme by Frank Martin, Op. 105 (1996)
- Tempus Perfectum, Concert Overture, Op. 109 (1998)
- A Millenium Overture, Op. 112 (1999); orchestration of the 3rd movement of the Cello Sonata No. 2 La Divina Commedia, Op. 89 (1990)
- Unraveling Dances, Op. 122 (2007)

=== Works for concert band, symphonic band and brass band ===
- Fantasia quasi una Toccata, for Brass Band, Op. 31 (1965)
- Canzona sopra un tema di Monteverdi, for Brass Band, Op. 38 (1968)
- Canzona Secundi Toni, for Brass Band, Op. 63 (1975)
- Quintet for Brass, Op. 70 (1978)
- Symphony No. 8 Trinity, for Concert Band, Op. 84 (1988)
- Lovely Joan, Rhapsody on an English Folk Song, for Concert Band, Op. 88 (1990)
- De Profundis, for Concert Band, Op. 91 (1991)
- Dances of Initiation, for Concert Band, Op. 98 (1993)
- Eclipse, for Concert Band, Op. 100 (1994)
- RAGA !, for Concert Band, Op. 104 (1995)
- Three Northern Sketches, for Symphonic Band, Op. 117 (2003)
- Now Cometh the Redeemer, for Symphonic Band, Op. 119 (2005); transcription of the 2nd movement of the String Sextet, Op. 47 (1970; revised in 1997)

=== String quartets ===
- String Quartet No. 1, Op. 10 (1962)
- String Quartet No. 2, Op. 19 (1963; revised in 1993)
- String Quartet No. 3, Op. 32 (1965; revised in 1992)
- String Quartet No. 4, Op. 56 (1972)
- String Quartet No. 5, Op. 66 (1977)
- String Quartet No. 6, Op. 118 (2004); dedicated to Mattias Vanderwerf

=== Other chamber works ===
- Sonata for Flute and Cello, Op. 16 (1962; revised in 1975)
- Sonata for Violin and Piano No. 1, Op. 18 (1963; revised in 2004)
- Woodwind Quintet, Op. 26 (1964; revised in 1997)
- Piano Quintet No. 1, for Piano and String Quartet, Op. 35 (1967)
- Concertino, for Harp, Harpsichord, Celesta and Piano, Op. 39 (1968; revised in 1989)
- Sonata for Cello and Piano No. 1, Op. 41 (1968)
- String Sextet, for two violins, two violas and two cellos, Op. 47 (1970; revised in 1997)
- Sonata for Oboe and Piano, Op. 54 (1972)
- Sonata for Violin and Piano No. 2, Op. 54a (1972); transcription of the Oboe Sonata, Op. 54
- Quintet for Brass, Op. 70 (1978)
- Sonata for French Horn and Piano, Op. 71 (1979)
- Consort Music, for 5 viole da gamba, Op. 75 (1980); also orchestrated
- Sonata for Cello and Piano No. 2 La Divina Commedia, Op. 89 (1990); 3rd movement orchestrated in 1999 as A Millenium Overture, Op. 112
- A Duet for Violas, Op. 94 (1991); also transcribed by Maxine Neuman for two cellos
- Danses a la Mode, Op. 101 (1994); also transcribed by the composer for violin
- Piano Quintet No. 2, for Piano and String Quartet, Op. 103 (1995)
- Sonata in B-flat for Trombone and Piano, Op. 106 (1996)
- Serpentine for Clarinet and Piano, Op. 110 (1999)
- Clausulae for Trombones, Op. 115 (2001)
- Sonata for Bassoon and Piano, Op. 121 (2006)
- Minyan, for Viola and Guitar, Op. 124 (2013)

=== Piano works ===
- Improvisation (No. 1) in G minor, Op. 1 (1958)
- Improvisation (No. 2) in E minor, Op. 2 (1958)
- Adam and Eve, Op. 4 (1961)
- Toccata in A major, Op. 6 (1961)
- Grand Waltz, Op. 9 (1961)
- Prelude in E minor, Op. 11 (1956); juvenilia, written before Op. 1
- Minuet in C major, Op. 12 (1956); juvenilia, written before Op. 1
- Waltz in G minor, Op. 13 (1956); juvenilia, written before Op. 1
- Piano Sonata No. 1 in F major, Op. 25 (1963)
- Piano Sonata No. 2 in A major, Op. 48 (1970)
- And He Sent Forth a Dove, Op. 49 (1971)
- Wedding March, Op. 53 (1971); also version for organ
- Piano Sonata No. 3 in A minor Sonata Eterea, Op. 69 (1978)
- Of Numbers and of Bells, Op. 79 (1983)
- Etz Chaim, Op. 99 (1993)

=== Works for other solo instruments ===
- Christmas Frescoes, for Percussion, Op. 46 (1970; revised in 1997)
- Wedding March, for Organ, Op. 53 (1971); also version for piano
- Musique de Clavecin, for Harpsichord, Op. 61 (1974)
- Prelude and Fugue, for Percussion, Op. 76 (1980)
- Sonatine d'Amour, for Harpsichord, Op. 83 (1987)
- A Plaintive Harmony, for solo Horn, Op. 85 (1988)
- 3,7, for solo Harp, Op. 114 (2000)
