= Richard Stoltzman =

American clarinetist (born 1942)

- Born: Richard Leslie Stoltzman; July 12, 1942 (age 84); Omaha, Nebraska
- Genres: Classical; Jazz
- Instrument: Clarinet
- Label: RCA Victor
- Website: http://www.richardstoltzman.com

Richard Leslie Stoltzman (born July 12, 1942) is an American clarinetist. Born in Omaha, Nebraska, he spent his early years in San Francisco, California, and Cincinnati, Ohio, graduating from Woodward High School in 1960. Today, Stoltzman is part of the faculty at the New England Conservatory and Boston University.

Stoltzman is perhaps the best-known clarinetist who primarily plays classical music. He has played with over 100 orchestras, as well as with many chamber groups and in many solo recitals. One of them, "Maid with Flaxen Hair", was used by Microsoft as "sample music" on Windows 7 to demonstrate the system's Windows Media Player in 2009. Stoltzman has received numerous awards and has produced an extensive discography. His virtuosity and musicianship were widely celebrated and have made him a highly sought-after concert artist. He's credited for bringing the clarinet to a large audience and changing the image of the instrument. He was sometimes criticized by some of his peers for his unorthodox style of play.

In addition to classical repertoire, Stoltzman also plays jazz and was noted for his interest in fusing genres. Some of his recordings, such as his album New York Counterpoint, feature both jazz and modern music. In 1983, Stoltzman commissioned composer/arranger Clare Fischer to write a symphonic work using Duke Ellington and Billy Strayhorn themes. The result was The Duke, Swee'pea and Me, an eleven-minute orchestral work which Stoltzman performed worldwide.

== Early years and education ==
Stoltzman's father worked for the Western Pacific Railroad and moved his family to San Francisco, California, soon after Richard was born. Stoltzman's first exposure to music came through his father, a fan of big band music. Stoltzman's father played the big band music of the 1940s at home on the radio and performed in a dance band during his spare time. Stoltzman began studying the clarinet at the age of eight with a teacher at a local school, and began playing with his father in the Stewart Memorial United Presbyterian Sunday School Orchestra and at community functions within a few years. When Stoltzman was in junior high school, he began developing the jazz techniques of improvisation and enjoyed jamming with his father at home. Benny Goodman was his earliest musical mentor, and remained an influence throughout his career. Stoltzman told Allan Kozinn of The New York Times, "(When) I was seven years old ... I found these wonderful cylindrical objects in a nice leather case. I enjoyed playing with them ... and I vaguely remember dangling them from the second-story window of our house. That caused quite a stir, because they turned out to be my father's clarinets. But instead of punishing me, he decided that I had an interest in the instrument and rented an indestructible metal clarinet for me to start on."

Stoltzman earned a bachelor's degree from Ohio State University with a double major in music and mathematics. He then studied with Keith Wilson at the Yale School of Music, where he received the Master of Music degree. He worked toward a doctoral degree at Columbia University. He has been a longtime student of master clarinet pedagogue Kalmen Opperman of New York. Together, they founded the Clarinet Summit, a semi-regular international gathering of clarinetists which has taken place since the 1990s. He has also recorded with the Kalmen Opperman clarinet choir.

== Performance and recording ==
Stoltzman has appeared as a soloist with numerous major symphonies, at international jazz festivals, and with stars such as Mel Tormé, George Shearing, Judy Collins, Woody Herman, Wayne Shorter, Chick Corea, Claude Bolling and others. He was a founding member of the chamber music group TASHI in 1973. In 1993, he was featured in the BBC series "Concerto!" He was the Guest artist with The Children's Orchestra Society at Alice Tully Hall of Lincoln Center in 2004. He has also given important recitals at Carnegie Hall and the Hollywood Bowl.

His discography includes nearly 40 releases, several of them with TASHI. Stoltzman is noted for his double lip embouchure, wide vibrato, and ability to mimic the sound of a human voice on the clarinet. He combines traditional and contemporary classical and jazz material with his own unorthodox style.

In August 1993, Stoltzman was featured in "Concerto!", a six-part television series featuring host Dudley Moore, conductor Michael Tilson Thomas and the London Symphony Orchestra. "Concerto!", created by the producers of the widely acclaimed "Orchestra" series featuring Moore and Sir Georg Solti, was aired on The Learning Channel and on England's Channel Four, and continues to be broadcast worldwide. The program featuring Stoltzman has been praised by critics and audiences alike and was the recipient of an Emmy Award in the International Performing Arts category.

Stoltzman has played with many widely recognized musicians, including Yo-Yo Ma, Richard Goode and Emanuel Ax. He has made an effort to play new music for the clarinet, and has had several works composed for him. Composers include: Toru Takemitsu ("Waves" and a concerto for clarinet and orchestra), Steve Reich ("New York Counterpoint"), Lukas Foss, Roberto Carnevale, and Einar Englund (clarinet concertos).

Stoltzman is known for his longtime collaboration with composer William Thomas McKinley, and his work has been featured frequently in recent years on Navona Records and MMC Recording.

A review in The New York Times said: "His mastery of the clarinet and his impeccable musicianship are no secret by now, but one who has not heard him play for a time can easily forget how rich and fluid the instrument can sound from top to bottom of its range. If Mr. Stoltzman is not one of a kind, who might the others be?"

== Awards and recognitions ==
Grammy Award for Best Chamber Music Performance:

- Emanuel Ax, Yo-Yo Ma & Richard Stoltzman for Brahms/Beethoven/Mozart: Clarinet Trios (1996)
- Richard Goode & Richard Stoltzman for Brahms: The Sonatas for Clarinet & Piano, Op. 120 (1983)

Other awards

- On 1 September 2005, Stoltzman was presented with the Yale School of Music's Sanford Medal.
- In 1986 he was the first wind player to be awarded the Avery Fisher Prize.
- He was inducted into the American Academy of Arts and Sciences in 2013.

== See also ==
- Clare Fischer
