= Capstone Records =

American classical music record label

- Parent company: Parma Recordings
- Founded: 1986
- Founder: Richard Brooks
- Genre: Classical
- Country of origin: United States
- Location: Brooklyn, New York
- Official website: capstonerecords.org

Capstone Records is an American classical music record label focusing particularly on contemporary classical music. It was established by Richard Brooks in 1986 and was based in Brooklyn, New York. The label has hundreds of releases featuring a wide range of composers from William Albright, Milton Babbitt, Robert Baksa, and John Cage to Mary Jeanne van Appledorn, Rodney Waschka II, Iannis Xenakis, and Chen Yi. Performers represented on the label include such groups as the California EAR Unit, the Nevsky String Quartet, Steven Graff, and the Slovak Radio Symphony Orchestra. In 2009, the company was acquired by Parma Recordings of Hampton, New Hampshire. In the spring of 2009 it was announced Capstone would be run as an imprint.

== See also ==
- List of record labels
