= Albany Records =

American classical music record label

- Founded: 1987
- Founder: Peter Kermani
- Genre: Classical, contemporary classical
- Country of origin: U.S.
- Location: Albany, New York
- Official website: www.albanyrecords.com

Albany Records is a record label that concentrates on unconventional contemporary classical music by American composers and musicians. It was established by Peter Kermani in 1987 and is based in Albany, New York.

In May 2024, Albany Records was acquired by New Hampshire-based label, PARMA Recordings.

== See also ==
- List of record labels
