= Montezuma (Sessions opera) =

1964 opera by the American composer Roger Sessions

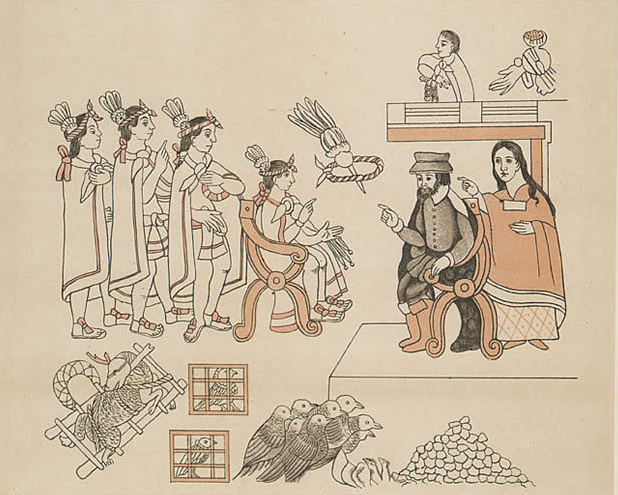
Cortez and Malinche meet Montezuma in Tenochtitlán

Montezuma is an opera in three acts by the American composer Roger Sessions, with an English libretto by Giuseppe Antonio Borgese that incorporates bits of the Aztec language, Nahuatl, as well as Spanish, Latin, and French.

Though Sessions did not receive Borgese's libretto (in first draft) until 1941, and work on the opera proceeded in an irregular fashion after ("Sessions thought that the end of his labor was in sight in the summer of 1952. He was mistaken, and the work on Montezuma was suspended"), the opera incorporates, essentially unchanged, sketches (from Sessions' notebooks) dating from the late 1930s, and was completed on October 15, 1963.

== Performance history ==
Montezuma was first performed on 19 April 1964 at the Deutsche Oper Berlin, in a German translation.

The American premiere (and the first performance with the original English libretto) was given on 31 March 1976 by the Opera Company of Boston, conducted by Sarah Caldwell. The cast included Richard Lewis (Montezuma), Alexander Stevenson (Bernal Díaz del Castillo, the Young), Donald Gramm (Bernal Díaz del Castillo, the Old), Brent Ellis (Cortez), Phyllis Bryn-Julson (Malinche), Alan Crofoot (Jerónimo Aguilar/veteran), and Eunice Alberts as Cuaximatl.

The New York City premiere was given in February 1982 by the Juilliard American Opera Center, conducted by Frederik Prausnitz. Bernal was sung by Robert Keefe, Cortez by James Dietsch, Alvarado by Cornelius Sullivan, Montezuma by Robert Grayson, and Malinche by Hei-Kyung Hong. The scenery was designed by Ming Cho Lee, costume design by Nan Cibula, and the lighting was by Beverly Emmons.

== Roles ==
Roles, voice type, premiere cast
Role	Voice type	Premiere cast, 19 April 1964 Conductor: Heinrich Hollreiser
Bernal Díaz del Castillo, the Old	bass	Ernst Krukowski
Bernal Díaz del Castillo, the Young	tenor	Karl Ernst Mercker
Cacamatzin	tenor	Martin Vantin
Cuauhtemoc	baritone	Barry McDaniel
Cuaximatl	mezzo-soprano	Yonako Nagano
Fray Olmedo de la Merced	bass	Manfred Röhrl
Guidela	baritone	
Hernán Cortez	baritone	William Dooley
Itlamal	soprano	Marina Türke
Malinche	soprano	Annabelle Bernard
Jeronimo Aguilar	baritone	Walter Dicks
Montezuma	tenor	Helmut Melchert
Netzahualcoyotl	bass	Martti Talvela
Passer-by 1	baritone	Wilhelm Lang
Passer-by 2	baritone	Robert Koffmane
Pedro de Alvarado	tenor	Loren Driscoll
A Soldier of Cortez's Army	tenor	Cornelis van Dijk
Teuhtlilli, an ambassador of Montezuma	tenor	Helmut Krebs
Veteran	baritone	Hanns Heinz Nissen

== Reception ==
Former British Prime Minister Edward Heath, after hearing the US premiere in Boston in 1976, said "I found it fascinating. … I liked the subject—one of the few instances of an important event in history where the British played no part. In the tragedy of Montezuma we share no responsibility". The opera contains human sacrifice, burning at the stake, stabbing, stoning, rule by terror, cannibalism, a love story, war, homesickness, intrigue, a ritual dance, and the supernatural.

Frank J. Oteri asks whether Montezuma and the operas of Dallapiccola ought to be regarded as being among the "important 12-tone operas", along with Berg's Lulu, Schoenberg's Moses und Aron, and Zimmermann's Die Soldaten. Andrea Olmstead agrees that Montezuma may aptly be compared with Berg's Lulu and Wozzeck, but primarily because of their shared extensive use of ostinato rhythms. Michael Steinberg says that it is "arguably the richest opera yet written by an American composer", and like Olmstead compares it to Wozzeck and Lulu (as well as to Les Troyens, Moses und Aron, War and Peace, and Palestrina) because, like them, Montezuma has long remained a "legend". Andrew Porter echos the "legendary" characterization and the comparison to Pfitzner's Palestrina, adding that these two operas, as well as Busoni's Doktor Faust, Hindemith's Harmonie der Welt, and Dallapiccola's Ulisse are "both personal and closely argued". At the same time, he cautions that "both text and music are insistent, unrelaxed, and reject passive acceptance", placing unusually high demands on the audience through the combination of Borgese's "Wardour Street diction" and Sessions's musical setting, which frequently superimposes two different vocal settings or accompanies the voices with orchestration that "amounts in performance to stiff competition". Patrick Smith agrees with the comparison to Moses und Aron because both are works "of the mind rather than of the opera stage". However, he does not find Sessions the match of Schoenberg's "ramrod genius", so that Montezuma "remains a tableau-oratorio" in which the salient moments (including a love duet inspired by Verdi's Otello) fail to be "drawn into a cohesive and ongoing whole". He finds the opera's greatest defect is its libretto, a "farrago of poetasty", which is "a ghastly example of self-parody that even a Robert Benchley could not have topped". John Harbison similarly finds parallels between the act-1 endings of both Montezuma and Otello, but also notes similarities to Aida and Tristan und Isolde.

Harbison regards the opera highly, describing it as "one of four or five great operas of the century", and this in spite of the fact that, as a "continuous-flow" opera, it is the opposite of the set-piece operas he generally prefers, with clear division between aria and recitative, simple textures, frequent ensembles, and unambiguous dramatic situations and text. As the "best 'way in'" to the music's "monumental force and vivideness", he recommends listening to Sessions's cantata When Lilacs Last in the Dooryard Bloomed (1969) and the Eighth Symphony (1968). Donal Henahan said that the opera lacks, "a dramatically viable libretto and a score worth hearing sung". Peter Maxwell Davies said that the libretto is "full-blown and rhetorical", but "the composer dealt with his text with such assurance that the music convincingly carried even this ponderous weight of language. ... There is little doubt that this is Sessions' masterpiece", and described Montezuma as "a huge step in the history of American music". Reflecting a few days later, Davies conceded that the "profusion of musical detail obscured, for many listeners, the basic simplicity of Sessions' musical material", and that the "surface" of the music is "by no means always ingratiating" but nevertheless maintained that, "if one can take in the music as a whole, its enormous gestures and long articulations begin to fall into place, and Sessions emerges as a great lyricist with a full and virile melodic sweep." For "unprepared ears", Davies recommended the best approach is through Sessions's "readily assimilated Fifth Symphony ... the stylistic key to the most difficult section of the opera, the third and final act." An unnamed correspondent for the Times, reporting on the Berlin premiere, found the score "spare and mechanical", and felt that listening "requires far more application than most theatregoers are prepared to give it". Defects included "complex scoring" and "impenetrable subtleties of the vocal line", so that the "strain on the ear is excessive". After hearing both the American premiere in Boston and the 1982 Juilliard production, Peter G. Davis concurred: "the opera's flaws only become more apparent and aggravating with each hearing". Citing the "syntactically tortured libretto", combined with the thick textures of Sessions's music, "the ear becomes lost in a sea of gray monotony". In sum, "there can only be one sad conclusion: Sessions has written a terrible opera, a tragic waste of a valuable composer's precious time." Martin Brody, on the contrary, finds the overlapping, complex vocal lines consistently reinforce "an ironic undercutting of virtually all the ethical and political positions taken by the characters", so that the portrayed events are "viewed as tragic and absurd in equal parts". Conceding that the language of the libretto is largely "complicated and awkward", the drama nevertheless is "psychologically and politically focussed at all times". The music is "among Sessions's richest: dense and colourful, gesturally graphic throughout, dramatically motivated and fully integrated at all structural levels".

== Sources ==
- Anon. 1964. 'American Opera Staged in Berlin First'. The Times (6 May).
- Brody, Martin. 1992. 'Montezuma (ii)' in The New Grove Dictionary of Opera, edited by Stanley Sadie. London: Macmillan Publishers. ISBN 0-333-73432-7.
- Davies, Peter Maxwell. 1964a. "Sessions's Opera Stirs Berliners: Montezuma Is Greeted by Violent Reactions". The New York Times (April 21): 43.
- Davies, Peter Maxwell. 1964b. "Montezuma Creates a Stir in Berlin". The New York Times (May 3): X11.
- Davis, Peter G. 1982. "Montezuma's Revenge". New York (8 March): 89–90.
- Harbison, John. 1977. "Roger Sessions and Montezuma". Tempo, new series, no. 121 (June): 2–5.
- Henahan, Donal. 1982. "Opera: Juilliard Gives Sessions Montezuma", The New York Times (February 21): section 1, p. 51.
- Kessler, Daniel. 2008. Sarah Caldwell: The First Woman of Opera. Lanham, Maryland: Scarecrow Press. ISBN 978-0-8108-5947-0 (cloth) ISBN 978-0-8108-6110-7 (pbk).
- Olmstead, Andrea. 1985. "The Plum'd Serpent: Antonio Borgese's and Roger Sessions's Montezuma". Tempo, new series, no. 152 (March): 13–22.
- Olmstead, Andrea. 2008. Roger Sessions: A Biography. New York: Routledge. ISBN 978-0-415-97713-5 (hardback) ISBN 978-0-415-97714-2 (pbk.) ISBN 978-0-203-93147-9 (ebook).
- Oteri, Frank J. 2008. "Why Not 12-Tone Opera?". Sequenza21 (July 11 blog post) (accessed 19 August 2015).
- Porter, Andrew. 1976. "The Matter of Mexico". The New Yorker (April 19): 115–21. Reprinted in his Music of Three Seasons: 1974–1977, 337–344. New York: Farrar, Straus & Giroux, 1978.
- Prausnitz, Frederik. 2002. Roger Sessions: How a "Difficult" Composer Got That Way. Oxford and New York: Oxford University Press. ISBN 0-19-510892-2
- Smith, Patrick J. 1976. 'Boston Opera: "Montezuma"'. High Fidelity/Musical America 26, no. 7 (July): MA-24.
- Soria, Dorle J. 1976. "Artist Life". High Fidelity/Musical America 26, no. 7 (July): MA-5 & MA-35.
- Steinberg, Michael. 1976. "Enter Montezuma: Roger Sessions' Complex Opera Finally Gets Its U.S. Premiere in Boston—A Dozen Years after Its World Premiere in Berlin'. Opera News 40, no. 19 (April 3): 10–16.
