= Piano Sonata No. 2 (Sessions) =

Piano sonata composed in 1946

Roger Sessions' Piano Sonata No. 2 was composed in 1946. It has three movements:

1. Allegro con fuoco (tempo quarter note = 120)
2. Lento (quarter note = 50)
3. Misurato e pesante (quarter note = 66–72)

The first two movements each end in a slight pause, followed by a briefer pause.

The opening motive of the first movement, an upward-leaping fourth followed by a minor second and a major second, is related to the major second-minor second alternation of the main theme of the Lento.

The first two movements are tripartite in form while the third has been compared by Richard Dyer to a toccata.

Sessions worked on the sonata in conjunction with his second symphony, completed the same year, and his opera Montezuma, but the latter did not achieve final form until much later.

The sonata is one of Sessions' relatively often-recorded works. Of his others the First String Quartet (1936), Pages from a Diary (1939) and his First (1930) and Third Piano Sonatas (1965) have been recorded as often or about as often.

== Recordings ==
Sources: Olmstead Discography; WorldCat

- Noël Lee, piano on 1960s Valois LP "MB 755", "La Musique Américaine de piano au XXe siècle : Volume 2" with works by Aaron Copland and Elliott Carter.
- Beveridge Webster, piano on Dover Publications LP "HCR-5265", "Modern American Piano Music" with works by Aaron Copland and Elliott Carter.
- Alan Marks, piano on Composers Recordings S-385 LP from 1978.
- Rebecca La Brecque, piano on a ca. 1981 Opus One LP, Opus One 56, "The Three Piano Sonatas".
- Randall Hodgkinson, piano on New World Records LP "Fantasies and Impromptus", 1984. Coupled with Donald Martino's Fantasies and Impromptus. Reissued on CD with Sessions' Piano Sonata no. 3 played by Robert Helps.
- Barry David Salwen, piano on Koch International Classics CD 3-7106-2H1, The Complete Piano Music of Roger Sessions (absent a few brief piano works from the 1930s), released 1992.
- Peter Lawson, piano on Virgin Classics 1993 CD 61928. Coupled with works by Charles Tomlinson Griffes and Ives.
- William Cerny, piano on Wilmarc Records, 1998 CD. Coupled with the Sonata, 1967 of Peter Mennin.
- Robert Helps, piano on 1998 CRI CD 800.
