= Symphony No. 9 (Sessions) =

The Symphony No. 9 by Roger Sessions is a symphony in three movements, completed in 1978. A performance lasts about 28 minutes.

== History ==
Sessions began his Ninth Symphony in 1975 on a commission from the Syracuse Symphony Orchestra, whose music director at the time was Frederik Prausnitz. It was completed in October 1978, but by the time of the first performance Prausnitz had been succeeded by Christopher Keene, who conducted the premiere in Syracuse on 17 January 1980. Prausnitz also conducted the work, two months later, at the Peabody Conservatory in Baltimore, on 18 March 1980, followed shortly by the first New York performance on 22 March by Keene and the Syracuse Symphony in Carnegie Hall.

Sessions referred to a "special task" he set himself in writing this symphony, which "involves both agony and joy in the making of it". This refers to the portrayal of evil, inspired by William Blake's poem "The Tyger", represented especially in the first movement of Sessions's symphony. The composer said the first measures represent the tiger lying in wait, and the movement concludes with the question, "Could he who made the lamb make thee?".

== Analysis ==
The symphony is in three movements in the traditional fast-slow-fast pattern. The second and third movements are performed without a break:

1. Allegro — Impetuoso — tranquillo
2. Con movimento adagio — doppio movimento quasi allegretto
3. Allegro vivace

Although a single twelve-tone row forms the basis of the entire symphony, a second, related row is also used in the first movement only. This main row is:

C♯, C, G, F, G♯, A / D, B, D♯, E, B♭ F♯

The two hexachords of this row are combinatorial by inversion at T_{3} (transposition by a minor third). The secondary row in the first movement is:

A–G–F–F♯–C–A♭ / B♭–D–B–E♭–E–C♯

However, Sessions's free treatment of the combinatorial hexachords and of various trichord (particularly 014, 016, and 026) tends to displace textbook twelve-tone technique, producing a complex but coherent network of pitch-class sets.

The second, slow movement is in ternary (ABA) form with a coda. The trombone plays an especially prominent role in this movement, a choice of instrument unusual for Sessions.

The finale, which continues without a break from the slow movement, is at least superficially a rondo. In this movement Sessions uses meter and tempo as bases simultaneously to mark and to blur formal articulations. It is the most difficult movement of the symphony to grasp formally, largely because of the constantly fluctuating tempos, which "produce a musical vertigo typical of Sessions's late music".

== Discography ==
- Roger Sessions: Symphonies 6, 7 & 9. American Composers Orchestra, Dennis Russell Davies, cond. Recorded May 1994, Manhattan Center, New York. CC recording, 1 disc: digital, stereo, 4¾ in. Argo 444 519-2. London: The Decca Record Company Limited, 1995.
