= Symphony No. 4 (Sessions) =

The Symphony No. 4 of Roger Sessions was composed in 1958.

It has three movements:

1. Burlesque. Allegro giocoso
2. Elegy. Adagio
3. Pastorale. Andante tranquillo e grazioso, un poco indolente

It was commissioned by the Minneapolis Symphony Orchestra for the Minnesota Centennial, and premiered by the Minnesota Orchestra conducted by Antal Doráti on January 2, 1960.

The second movement's basically slow tempo is interrupted twice by faster episodes. This movement was intended as an elegy for the composer's brother, John, who died in 1948. The finale, also slow, increases in intensity towards its close. Andrea Olmstead describes all of Sessions's symphonies as "serious" and "funereal".

== Discography ==
- Roger Sessions: Symphony No. 4, Symphony No. 5, Rhapsody for Orchestra. Columbus Symphony Orchestra, Christian Badea, cond. Recorded April 6, 1986, at the Ohio Theatre, Columbus Ohio. LP recording, 1 disc: digital, stereo, 12 in. New World NW 345–1; CD recording, 1 disc: digital, stereo, 4¾ in. New World NW 345–2. New York: Recorded Anthology of American Music, 1987.
