= Symphony No. 3 (Sessions) =

The Symphony No. 3 of Roger Sessions was written in 1957. It was a result of a commission by the Koussevitzky Foundation to celebrate the 75th anniversary of the Boston Symphony Orchestra, and was premiered by the Boston Symphony on December 6, 1957, conducted by Charles Munch. Sessions later was commissioned by the Boston Symphony on their centenary, when he provided them with his Concerto for Orchestra (premiered 1981). Andrea Olmstead describes all of Sessions's symphonies as "serious" and "funereal", with No. 3 being one of four with, "quiet reflective endings."

== Instrumentation ==
It is scored for three flutes, three oboes, four clarinets, three bassoons, four horns, two trumpets, three trombones, one tuba, timpani, percussion, a celesta, a harp and strings.

== Structure ==
It is in four movements:

1. Allegro grazioso e con fuoco
2. Allegro, un poco ruvido
3. Andante sostenuto e con affetto
4. Allegro con fuoco

== Recordings ==
1. Igor Buketoff, Royal Philharmonic Orchestra (1968?, RCA) (CRI CD)
