= Leonhard Sohncke =

German mathematician (1842–1897)

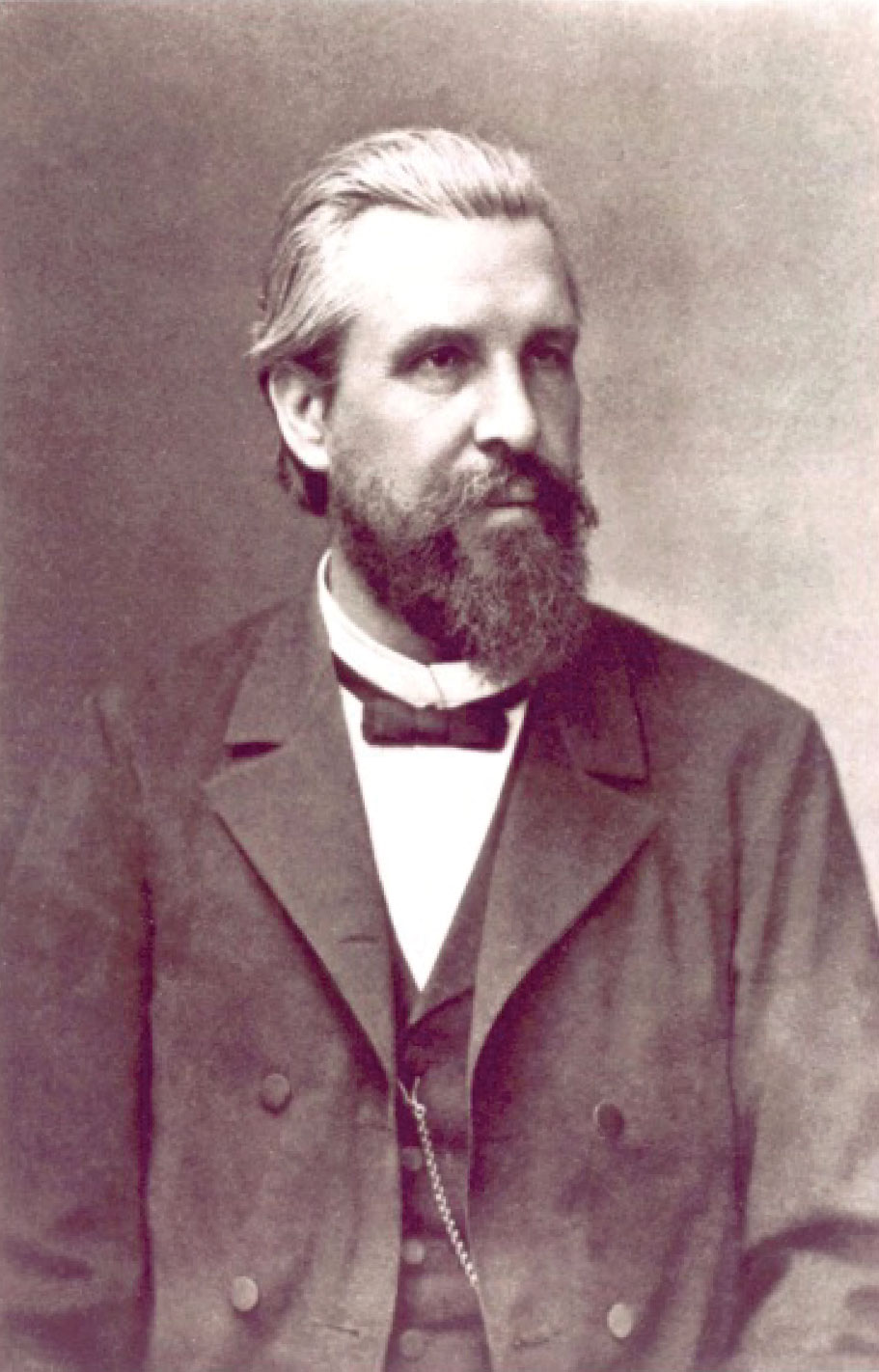
- Born: 22 February 1842; Halle (Saale), Kingdom of Prussia
- Died: 1 November 1897 (aged 55); Munich, Germany
- Education: University of Halle
- Known for: Space groups
- Spouse: Elise Bernhardi (m. 1866)
- Children: two daughters
- Scientific career
- Fields: Mathematics, Crystallography, Physics, Meteorology
- Workplaces: Collegium Fridericianum; University of Königsberg; Technical University of Karlsruhe; University of Jena; Technical University of Munich

Leonhard Sohncke (22 February 1842 in Halle (Kingdom of Prussia) – 1 November 1897 in Munich (German Empire)) was a German mathematician, physicist, and mineralogist.

== Life and career ==
Leonhard Sohncke was born as son of Ludwig Adolf Sohncke, a professor for mathematics in Halle. Leonhard Sohncke studied mathematics and sciences at the University in his native town, and passed the examination for high school teachers in 1862. With this qualification he became teacher at the Collegium Fridericianum in Königsberg in the Prussian province of East Prussia, and worked in this position until 1871. In this time he wrote his doctoral thesis in mathematics, which he submitted to Halle University, where he was in contact with Eduard Heine and Carl Neumann. With the duty of twenty-two lessons a week as teacher, he additionally continued his studies at the University of Königsberg, where he attended courses at the Königsberg Seminar for Physics, once founded by his father L. A. Sohncke together with Carl Gustav Jacob Jacobi and Franz Ernst Neumann, the father of Carl Neumann. Franz Neumann interested Sohncke for mineralogical problems, and he eventually qualified himself as private lecturer at the university in 1869 with a habilitation thesis in mineralogy.

Two years later he was claimed as professor of physics to the Polytechnical School in Karlsruhe, which was the first German Technische Hochschule and the preceding institution of today's Karlsruhe Institute of Technology. He was also appointed head of the meteorological observatory with responsibility for the meteorological service of the Grand Duchy of Baden, and started research on meteorology. In the academic year 1878/79 Sohncke was elected Director of the Karlsruhe Institute. In 1883, he followed a claim to the University of Jena as first director of the new founded institute of physics, after Emil Warburg had declined; there he drew his attention mainly to experimental physics. Finally in 1886, he moved to the Technical University of Munich, where he worked until his death. Sohncke was a successful academic teacher. His lectures in Jenas had the greatest frequency of students.

In 1866, Sohncke married his cousin Elise Berhardi; they had two daughters. He died from a kidney disease on 1 November 1897 in Munich.

== Scientific work ==
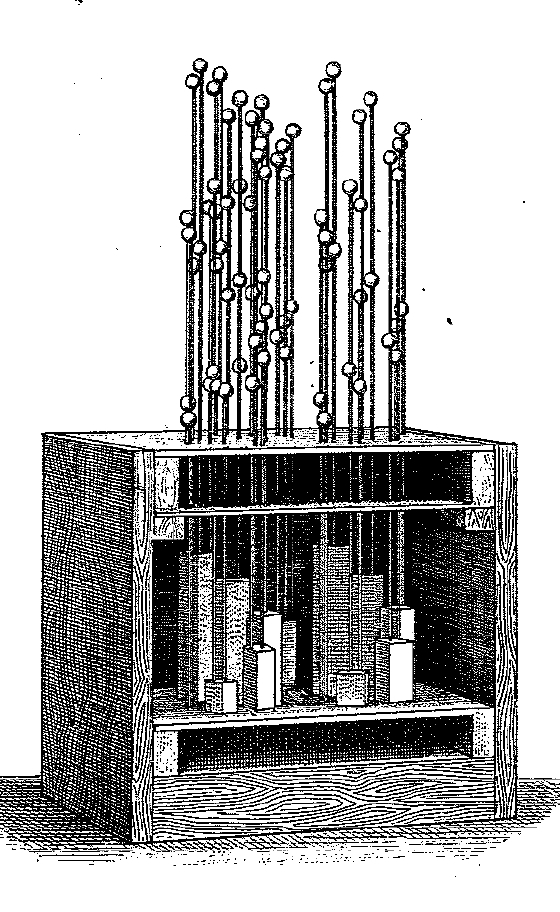
One of Sohncke's teaching models for space groups

Leonhard Sohncke wanted to understand the relations between the structure of crystals and their physical properties. A major experimental study dealt with the cohesion of rock salt by measuring its ultimate tensile strength in the different crystallographic directions (1869). He investigated the influence of temperature on the optical rotation of crystalline material both theoretically and experimentally (1875), and found that natural light is affected by electromagnetic forces in the same way as polarized light (1886). Leonhard Sohncke is mainly known for his mathematical studies on the structure of crystals that kept him for more than a decade. He combined the 14 Bravais lattices with the rotation axes and the screw axes and thereby got the totally 65 space groups that are commonly called "Sohncke groups", in which chiral crystal structures form (1879). Sohncke discussed thoroughly the results of previous researches on that matter, especially Auguste Bravais and Jordan. This sense for history of science led him write a special publication on Johann F. C. Hessel (1891), who had discovered the 32 crystallographic point groups in 1830, but was nearly completely ignored by his colleagues.

Early in Königsberg (1867), he demonstrated a presumption of the Göttingen astronomer Wilhelm Klinkerfues on an influence of a star's motion to the refraction of its light, with consequence of breaking the Doppler effect, was in error.

In Jena, he researched on Newton's rings and thin-film interference, in cooperation with Albert Wangerin in Halle, whom he knew from the Königsberg Seminar of Physics; Wangerin took the theoretical part, and Sohncke the experimental one. They found errors in the previous concepts on this matter; in contrary to preceding research they took into account the thickness of the plane glass and the extension of the source of light. Other cooperation partners in Jena were Ernst Abbe and Siegfried Czapski on the field of optical polarization.

Sohncke developed a theory on atmosperical electricity applying Faraday's discovery, that friction of water on ice causes static electricity. to the atmosphere.

Sohncke was engaged in the popularization of science, and gave general comprehensible lectures, most of them in his Jena and Munich time, some of them were edited in 1892. In Karlsruhe, he was co-founder of the "Oberrheinischer Geologischer Verein" (Upper Rhenanian Geological Association). In Jena, he was member of the "Medizinisch-naturwissenschaftliche Gesellschaft" (Association for Medicin and Science). In Munich, his interest in meteorology let him come in contact to the airship and balloon community. He was co-founder and chairman of the "Münchener Vereinigung für Luftschiffahrt" (Munich Association for Airshipping), and published meteorological results taken from balloon journeys together with Sebastian Finsterwalder. Sohncke and Finsterwalder were the scientific observers during the first balloon night flight of the Munich Association.

== Honours ==
Leonhard Sohncke was awarded the following orders, titles, and memberships of scientific institutions.

- Member of the Royal Bavarian Academy of Sciences
- Honorary member of the "Naturwissenschaftlicehr Verein Karlsruhe"
- Member of the "Physikalisch-medizinische Societät Erlangen"
- Honorary doctorate of the University of Padua
- Knight 1st class, of the Order of the Zähringer Lion (Grand Duchy of Baden)
- Order of Saint Michael, 4th class (Kingdom of Bavaria)
- Honorary title "Hofrath" (Grand Duchy of Baden)

== Selected writings ==
- De aequatione differentiali seriei hypergeometrica (in Latin), Halle, 1866 (Doctoral thesis)
- "Die Gruppierung der Molecüle in den Krystallen" [The Grouping of Molecules in Crystals], Annalen der Physik und Chemie (in German), 132: 75–106, 1867
- "Ueber den Einfluss der Bewegung einer Lichtquelle auf die Brechung. Kritische Bemerkungen zu der Entdeckung des Hrn. Prof. Klinkerfues" [On the influence of a source of light motion to the refraction. Critical remarks to a discovery of Prof. Klinkerfues], Annalen der Physik und Chemie (in German), 132: 279–292, 1867
- Sohncke, L. (1869), "Ueber die Cohäsion des Steinsalzes in krystallographisch verschiedenen Richtungen" [On the Cohesion of Rock salt in different crystallographic Directions], Annalen der Physik und Chemie (in German), 137 (6): 177–200, Bibcode:1869AnP...213..177S, doi:10.1002/andp.18692130602
- "Die regelmäßigen ebenen Punktsysteme von unbegrenzter Ausdehnung" [The regular plane Point systems of unlimited Extension], Journal für die reine und angewandte Mathematik (in German), 77: 47–101, 1874
- Sohncke, L. (1875), "Zur Theorie des optischen Drehvermögens von Krystallen" [On the Theory of optical Rotation of Crystals], Mathematische Annalen (in German), 9 (4): 504–529, doi:10.1007/BF01442477
- Die unbegrenzten regelmäßigen Punktsysteme als Grundlage einer Theorie der Krystallstruktur [The unlimited plane Point systems as a basis of a Crystal Structure Theory] (in German), Karlsruhe: G. Braun'sche Hofbuchhandlung, 1876
- Sohncke, Leonhard (1878), "Ueber den Einfluss der Temperatur auf das optische Drehvermögen des Quarzes und des chlorsauren Natrons" [On the Influence of Temperature to the optical Rotation of Quartz and Sodium chloratum], Annalen der Physik und Chemie, Neue Folge (in German), 3 (4): 516–531, Bibcode:1878AnP...239..516S, doi:10.1002/andp.18782390407
- Entwickelung einer Theorie der Krystallstruktur [Development of a Theory of Crystal Structure] (in German), Leipzig: B. G. Teubner, 1879
- Sohncke, L.; Wangerin, A. (1881), "Neue Untersuchungen über die Newton'schen Ringe" [New Investigations on Newton's rings], Annalen der Physik und Chemie, Neue Folge (in German), 12: 1–40, 201–249
- Sohncke, L.; Wangerin, A. (1883), "Ueber Interferenzerscheinungen an dünnen, insbesondere keilförmigen Blättchen" [On Interferences at thin, especially wedge-shaped sheets], Annalen der Physik und Chemie, Neue Folge (in German), 20: 127–227, 391–425
- Der Ursprung der Gewitter-Elektricität und der gewöhnlichen Elektricität der Atmosphäre. Eine meteorologisch-physikalische Untersuchung [The origin of the Electricity of Lightnings and the common Electricity of the Atmosphere] (in German), Jena: Gustav Fischer, 1885
- Sohncke, L. (1886), "Electromagnetische Drehung natürlichen Lichts" [Electromagnetical Rotation of natural light], Annalen der Physik und Chemie, Neue Folge (in German), 27 (2): 203–219, Bibcode:1886AnP...263..203S, doi:10.1002/andp.18862630207
- "Electrisierung von Eis durch Wasserreibung" [Electric Charging of Ice by Friction with Water], Annalen der Physik und Chemie, Neue Folge (in German), 28: 550–560, 1886
- "Erweiterung der Theorie der Kristallstruktur" [Extension of the Theory of Crystals], Zeitschrift für Kristallographie (in German), 14: 426–446, 1888
- Sohncke, L. (1890), "Die schliessliche Dicke eines auf Wasser sich ausbreitenden Oeltropfens" [The final thickness of an oil drop spreading on water], Annalen der Physik und Chemie, Neue Folge (in German), 40 (6): 345–355, Bibcode:1890AnP...276..345S, doi:10.1002/andp.18902760611
- "Die Entdeckung des Eintheilungsprincips der Krystalle durch J. F. C. Hessel. Eine historische Studie" [The Discovery of the Principle of ordering of Crystals by J. F. C. Hessel. A historical study], Zeitschrift für Kristallographie (in German), 18: 486–498, 1891
- Gemeinverständliche Vorträge aus dem Gebiete der Physik [Commonly comprehensible Lectures on the field of Physics] (in German), Jena: Gustav Fischer, 1892
- Ueber die Bedeutung wissenschaftlicher Ballonfahrten. (Festrede) [On the Importance of scientific Balloon flights. (Speech)] (in German), Munich: Verlag der k. b. Akademie der Wissenschaften, 1894
- "Ueber die Aenderung der specifischen Wärme mit der Temperatur" [On the Change of specific Heat with Temperature], Sitzungsberichte der Mathematisch-physikalischen Classe der K. B. Akademie der Wissenschaften (in German), 27: 337–342, 1888

== See also ==
- Geometrical crystallography before X-rays

== Sources ==
- Erk, Fritz (1898), "Leonhard Sohncke", Illustrierte Aeronautische Mittheilungen (in German), 2: 2–4
- Finsterwalder, Sebastian; Ebert, Hermann (1898), "Leonhard Sohncke", Jahresbericht der Königlich Technischen Hochschule in München 1897/98, Anhang (in German): 1–21
- Siegmund Günther (1908). "Sohncke, Leonhard" . Allgemeine Deutsche Biographie (in German). Vol. 54. Leipzig: Duncker & Humblot. pp. 377–379.
- Scholz, Erhard (1989). Symmetrie, Gruppe, Dualität : Zur Beziehung zwischen theoretischer Mathematik und Anwendungen in Kristallographie und Baustatik des 19. Jahrhunderts (PDF) (in German). Basel: Birkhäuser. ISBN 978-3-0348-9267-4. OCLC 851772224.
- Olesko, Kathryn M. (1991), Physics as a Calling. Discipline and practice in the Königsberg Seminar for Physics, Ithaca and London: Cornell University Press, ISBN 0-8014-2248-5
- Seidel, Paul (2009), "Leben und Werke von Leonhard Sohncke (1842–1897), einem Mitbegründer des Oberrheinischen Geologischen Vereins", Jahresberichte und Mitteilungen des Oberrheinischen Geologischen Vereins, Neue Folge (in German), 91: 101–112, doi:10.1127/jmogv/91/2009/101
- Schlote, Karl-Heinz; Schneider, Martina (2011), Mathematische Naturphilosophie, Optik und Begrifsschrift. Zu den Wechselbeziehungen zwischen Mathematik und Physik an der Universität Jena in der Zeit von 1816 bis 1900 (in German), Harri Deutsch, ISBN 978-3-8171-1843-4
- Leonhard Sohncke at the Mathematics Genealogy Project
