= Larry Thomas Bell =

American composer, pianist and music professor (born 1952)

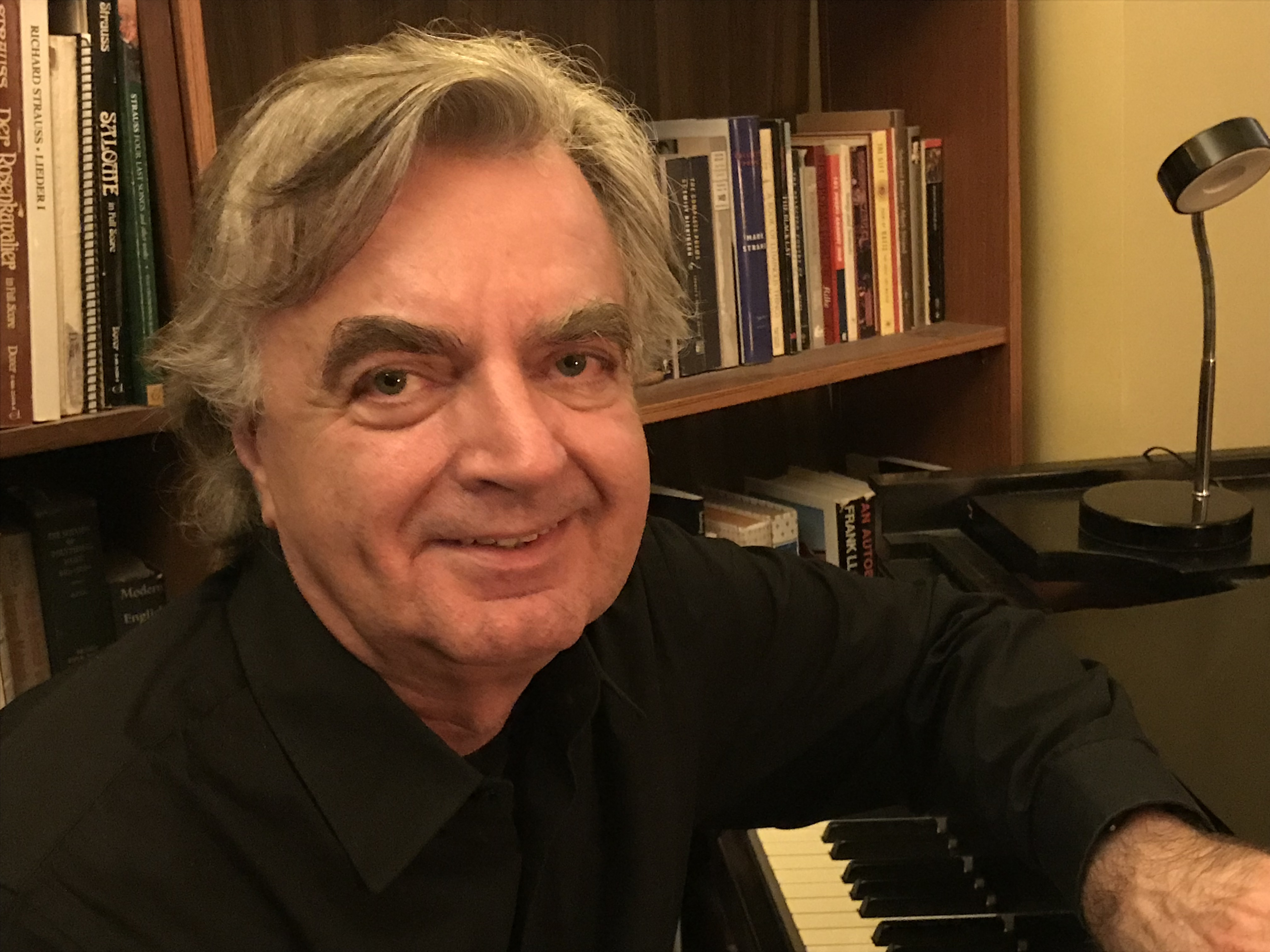
- Born: 17 January 1952; Wilson, North Carolina, U.S.
- Notable work: Opera Holy Ghosts, Op. 90; Piano Concerto, Op. 33 cantata The Seasons, Op. 101; List of compositions

Larry Thomas Bell (born January 17, 1952) is an American composer, pianist and music professor.

== Early life and education ==
Bell was born in Wilson, North Carolina on January 17, 1952. He began his music studies with piano lessons and soon after began playing in a rock band. He attended East Carolina University and Appalachian State University, where he worked with Gregory Kosteck and earned his Bachelor of Music degree in 1974. He then moved to New York, where he attended The Juilliard School, completing his Master of Music degree in 1977 and a Doctor of Musical Arts degree in 1982. While there he studied composition with Vincent Persichetti and Roger Sessions. A Guggenheim Fellowship (1981), Rome Prize (1982–3), and a Rockefeller grant (1985) took him to Italy, to study, write music, and take piano lessons with Joseph Rollino. On January 2, 1982, he married musicologist Andrea Olmstead.

== Career ==
=== Teaching appointments ===
Bell began teaching while in college, at the Juilliard Pre-College division (1979–1983). Since then he has been a faculty member of The Boston Conservatory (1980–2005), the New England Conservatory (1992–2018), and the Berklee College of Music (since 2007). Students have praised him "for his superlative teaching abilities, his talent for making complex issues understandable, his thoughtful approaches for gaining mastery of difficult skills, his wide-ranging musical knowledge, his musicianship, his patience, and his constant encouragement.". His composition students include Cynthia Wong, Forrest Eimold, George Li, Laura Schwindinger, Russ Grazier, Daniel Kharatian, Aaron Robinson and Martin Matalon.

=== Piano performance ===
As a pianist, Bell performs his music regularly and has championed works by American composers. He has given recitals throughout the United States, as well as in Italy, Austria, and Japan. He is frequently heard on Boston's WGBH (FM) radio, where he played on their first live broadcast on the World Wide Web of his trio Mahler in Blue Light. He has performed as soloist on recordings of his Piano Concerto and Piano Sonata, and as an assisting artist on the recordings River of Ponds (the complete cello music), The Book of Moonlight (the complete violin music), Larry Bell Vocal Music, and Larry Bell: In the Garden of Dreams. One reviewer called his playing "commendable–-not flashy, but brimming with musicality, intelligence, and desire to communicate. Tone quality was fetching and finger technique clean.”

=== Awards and residencies ===
Besides the Rome Prize and fellowships from the Guggenheim and Rockefeller Foundations, he was awarded the Charles Ives Prize from the American Academy of Arts and Letters and grants from the American Music Center, the American Symphony Orchestra League, and Meet the Composer. He has been a resident composer at Bennington College, the Woodstock/Fringe Festival, the American Academy in Rome, the Virginia Center for the Creative Arts, the Bellagio Study and Conference Center, the Rivers School Conservatory, the Hartt School, and the MacDowell Colony.

== Music ==
Influenced by Beethoven, Carter, and solfège pedagogue Renée Longy, his modernist early compositions (from the 1970s and 1980s) emphasized thematic development, polyphony, and elaborate polyrhythmic structures. In those years he began his performing career as a pianist and reconnected with American folk hymnody. Both of these choices led to a more tonal, melodically oriented, neo-Romantic style.

In more recent years, his speed of composition and frequency of piano performances have increased, resulting in multi-movement keyboard pieces in Baroque and classical forms, as well as works for orchestra and chorus, chamber music, solo keyboard music, and song cycles. By 2021 he had produced 174 works with opus numbers, many released on CD. His music has been performed by the Seattle Symphony and the Atlanta Symphony Orchestra and under conductors Gerard Schwarz, Jorge Mester, and Benjamin Zander; by the Juilliard and Borromeo String Quartets, and Speculum Musicae; cellists Eric Bartlett and Andrés Díaz; pianists Sara David Buechner and Jonathan Bass; and singers Robert Honeysucker, Matthew DiBattista, Thomas Gregg, and D’Anna Fortunato.

All aspects of Bell's music are synthesized in his two-act opera Holy Ghosts, which was premiered in 2009. Scored for a rock band, incorporating nine hymn tunes, and based on Romulus Linney's play, it combined Bell's Pentecostal Holiness background with his keyboard, vocal writing, and conducting skills.

=== Vocal music ===
Besides his opera Holy Ghosts, Bell has written many other works for vocal ensemble, solo voice, and vocal chamber music. An early piece for vocal ensemble is his SSATB quintet Domination of Black from 1971, a student work on a text by Wallace Stevens. His first solo vocal work, an extended piece for soprano and piano, is Reality is an Activity of the Most August Imagination (1976), another setting of a text by Wallace Stevens. A usual pairing of voice and instrument solos is found in his double concerto, The Idea of Order at Key West, op. 13 (1979–81) a work for soprano and violin soloists, large string orchestra, and percussion battery, also based on a poem by Wallace Stevens. More recently, he has composed sets of songs on texts by Emily Dickinson, William Shakespeare, and Thomas Campion. His most ambitious work for voices is The Seasons op. 101, a cantata consisting of four cycles of songs with texts by Elizabeth Kirschner. The work begins with Fall: Autumnal Raptures, for tenor and harp; followed by Winter: Exaltations of Snowy Stars, for mezzo-soprano and piano; then Spring: In the Pendulum of My Body, for baritone and harpsichord; and finally Summer: The Vanishing Dew, for soprano and guitar. The entire work is summed up in the Finale: Echolocations of Cellos, a single-movement work for all eight performers.

=== Instrumental music ===
Bell has composed works for many different instruments and instrumental combinations. Among his early works are Novelette for string quartet (1970), Mirage for flute and piano (1971), Eclogue for saxophone quartet (1973), his first String Quartet (1973), and Caprice for solo 'cello (1979). His noteworthy mature works include three string quartets, Harmonium, op. 48 (1997) for brass quintet, Quintessence, op. 39 (1993) for woodwind quintet, Tarab, op. 66 (2003) for double cello quartet, a series of Caprices for solo instruments, and Serenades for various instrumental ensembles. Several recent instrumental pieces have featured standard Baroque instrumental combinations, especially for the alto recorder and 'cello, with or without accompaniment.

=== Orchestra and band music ===
Among Bell's early works is Continuum, a student work for chamber orchestra (1971). A Piano Concerto was completed in 1989, followed by a Short Symphony for Band a decade later. Later orchestral works have added a children's chorus (Songs of Innocence and Experience) or a narrator (Hansel and Gretel).

=== Keyboard music ===
Bell has composed many works for piano, harpsichord or organ. One of his earliest piano works is a set of Variations from 1974, first performed at Juilliard. His more recent projects for keyboard have been larger sets of inventions, preludes or partitas, in the manner of Baroque works for harpsichord. He has also written a set of Etudes for student pianists to work on technical issues.

== Recordings ==
Recordings are available for a significant proportion of Bell's compositions. Several discs have been released that are devoted entirely to his works, while various individual pieces can be found on other recording devoted to American modern music.

== Publications ==
- Bell, Larry; Olmstead, Andrea (1986), "Musica reservata in Frederic Rzewski's North American Ballads", The Musical Quarterly, LXXII (4): 449–458, doi:10.1093/mq/LXXII.4.449.
- Bell, Larry (1992), "Some Remarks on the New Tonality", Contemporary Music Review, 6 (Part 2): 43–49, doi:10.1080/07494469200640091.
