= Symphony No. 8 (Sessions) =

The Symphony No. 8 of Roger Sessions was composed in 1968.

It is a work in two movements lasting together about 14 minutes:

1. Adagio e mesto
2. Allegro con brio

Noteworthy in the context of Sessions' symphonies is the use of maracas to accompany the theme in the first movement. Andrea Olmstead describes all of Sessions's symphonies as "serious" and "funereal", with No. 8 being one of four with, "quiet reflective endings." No. 8 combines the, "fearsome rhythmic and harmonic densities," of his maturity, "with the extended melodic phrases," which were always characteristic of Sessions.

The symphony was premiered on May 2, 1968, by the New York Philharmonic conducted by William Steinberg.

== Instrumentation ==
The symphony is scored for a large orchestra consisting of three flutes (third doubling alto flute), three oboes, four clarinets (fourth doubling E♭ clarinet), four bassoons (fourth doubling contrabassoon), four horns, three trumpets, four trombones, tuba, timpani, two percussionists, piano, harp, and strings.

== Recordings ==
- Frederik Prausnitz, conducting the New Philharmonia Orchestra. LP recording, 1 disc. Argo ZRG 702. Calouste Gulbenkian Foundation Series 3. 1973. With Sessions' Rhapsody for Orchestra and works by Wallingford Riegger and Thea Musgrave.
- Leon Botstein, conducting the American Symphony Orchestra. Recorded 9 October 2004, at the Richard B. Fisher Center for the Performing Arts, Bard College New York. CD recording, 1 disc. New World Records 80631-2. New York: Recorded Anthology of American Music, 2005. With works by Aaron Copland, George Perle and Bernard Rands.
