= Symphony No. 7 (Sessions) =

The Symphony No. 7 of Roger Sessions was written in 1967 for the 150th anniversary of the University of Michigan (Prausnitz, p. 285). It was premiered in Ann Arbor, Michigan, on October 1, 1967, by the Chicago Symphony Orchestra, conducted by Jean Martinon.

== Instrumentation ==
The symphony is scored for three flutes, three oboes, four clarinets, three bassoons, four horns, three trumpets, three trombones, one tuba, timpani, percussion, piano, harp, and strings.

== Structure and character ==
It is in three movements:

1. Allegro con fuoco
2. Lento e dolce
3. Allegro misurato – Tempo I, ma impetuoso – Epilogue: Largo

Andrea Olmstead describes all of Sessions's symphonies as "serious" and "funereal", with No. 7 being one of four with, "quiet reflective endings."

The composer said that the symphony was influenced by the Story of O.

== Recordings ==
1. Peter Leonard/Louisville Orchestra (Louisville First Edition Records LS 776, 1981. With Sessions' Divertimento for Orchestra.)
2. Dennis Russell Davies/American Composers Orchestra (Argo 444 519–2, 1995. Symphonies 6, 7, 9.)

== Sources ==
- Prausnitz, Frederik. Roger Sessions: How a "Difficult" Composer Got That Way. Oxford and New York: Oxford University Press, 2002. ISBN 0-19-510892-2.
