= Ludwig Adolf Sohncke =

German mathematician

Ludwig Adolf (Note: also written "Adolph") Sohncke (20 June 1807 in Königsberg (now Kaliningrad), Kingdom of Prussia – 16 January 1853 in Halle, Kingdom of Prussia) was a German mathematician. He was father of the mathematician Leonhard Sohncke.

== Life and work ==
Ludwig Adolf Sohncke studied at the Albertina University in his native town Königsberg, was doctoral student of Carl Gustav Jacob Jacobi. There he began his scientific career as a private lecturer in 1833. Together with Jacobi and Franz Ernst Neumann, he was co-founder and co-director of the Königsberg Seminar of Physics that aimed to install a more intensive and effective model for teaching Physics and mathematics. In this institution, Otto Hesse and Theodor Schönemann belonged to his students.

In 1835, he was appointed — by recommendation of Friedrich Wilhelm Bessel — to the University of Halle as extraordinary professor of mathematics in succession of Julius Plücker, where he advanced to an ordinary professor in 1839. He worked with varied interests in analysis, mainly in the field of elliptic functions, where he made discoveries over the complex multiplication, further in geometry, mechanics, and history of mathematics. He translated the History of Geometry by Michel Chasles (1837) into the German language, and edited some of his analytic lectures. Seen as a whole, his list of publications is small; possible reasons could be difficult economic condition, since the payments for professors in Halle were low and often was not enough for their living, or a great burden of teaching, or a problem with alcohol.

Together with the physics professor Kämtz, Sohncke made an attempt in 1837 to found a seminar for mathematics and physics similar to that he had been co-founder in Königsberg, but their initiative was opposed by the biologist Schweigger. After long negotiations, a "Seminar für Mathematik und die gesammten Naturwissenschaften" (Seminar for Mathematics and whole Sciences) was founded with Sohnche as head of the mathematical division; later he became director of the seminar. Although it brought out considerable success, it never got the importance of the Königsberg seminar.

Ludwig Adolf Sohncke died in Halle on 16 January 1853; his academic successor was Ferdinand Joachimsthal.

== Writings ==
- "Motus corporum coelestium in medio resistante", Journal für die reine und angewandte Mathematik (in Latin), 10: 23–40, 1833
- "Aequationes modulares pro transformatione functionum ellipticarum undecimi et decimi tertii et decimi septimi ordinis", Journal für die reine und angewandte Mathematik (in Latin), 12: 178, 1834
- "Aequationes modulares pro transformatione Functionum Ellipticarum", Journal für die reine und angewandte Mathematik (in Latin), 16: 97–130, 1837, doi:10.1515/crll.1837.16.97 (wrong spelling as "Sohnke")
- "Ueber das sphärische Viereck", Archiv der Mathematik und Physik (in Latin), 4: 447–448, 1844
- Analytische Geometrie (in German), Halle: H. W. Schmidt, 1851
- Analytische Theorie der Statik (in German), Halle: H. W. Schmidt, 1853
- Sohncke, L. A., ed. (1854), Verzeichniss der Bücher über die gesammten Zweige der Mathematik, welche in Deutschland und dem Auslande vom Jahre 1830 bis Mitte 1854 erschienen sind (in German)

== Sources ==
- Poggendorff, J. C., ed. (1863). Biographisch-literarisches Handwörterbuch zur Geschichte der exacten Wissenschaften. Zweiter Teil M–Z (in German). Leipzig: Johann Ambrosius Barth. p. 954.
- Moritz Cantor (1892). "Sohncke, Ludwig Adolf" . Allgemeine Deutsche Biographie (in German). Vol. 34. Leipzig: Duncker & Humblot. pp. 168–169.
- Olesko, Kathryn M. (1991), Physics as a Calling. Discipline and practice in the Königsberg Seminar for Physics, Ithaca and London: Cornell University Press, ISBN 0-8014-2248-5
- Schlote, Karl-Heinz; Schneider, Martina (2009), Von Schweiggers erstem Galvanometer bis zu Cantors Mengenlehre. Zu den Wechselbeziehungen zwischen Mathematik und Phydsik an der Universität Halle–Wittenberg in der Zeit von 1817 bis 1890 (in German), Harri Deutsch, ISBN 978-3-8171-1841-0
