= Symphony No. 1 (Sessions) =

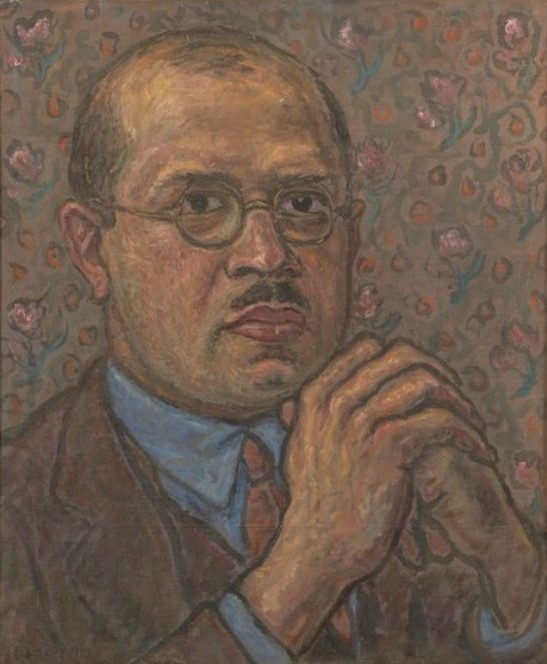
Portrait of Roger Sessions by Harold Weston (c. 1920s)

The Symphony No. 1 of Roger Sessions is a symphony in three movements, in E minor. It was completed in January 1927, and premiered by Serge Koussevitzky and the Boston Symphony Orchestra on April 22, 1927. It is dedicated to Sessions' father Archibald.

The three movements are as follows:

1. Giusto
2. Largo
3. Allegro vivace

The symphony is scored for three flutes (one doubling piccolo), three oboes (one doubling English horn), four clarinets, three bassoons, four horns, three trumpets, three trombones, one tuba, timpani, percussion, piano, and strings.

Andrea Olmstead describes all of Sessions's symphonies as "serious" and "funereal". In contrast, Prausnitz describes this symphony as having "a joyfully jazzy, organized vigor in its fast outer movements," in contrast with the middle movement, "a somberly reflective Largo that yields nothing to overt emotion. ..."

== Discography ==
- Roger Sessions: Symphony No. 1; William Bergsma: Music on a Quiet Theme; Russell Smith: Tetrameron. Japan Philharmonic Symphony Orchestra [ihon Firuhamoni Kokyo Gakudan], Akeo Watanabe, cond. (Sessions and Smith); William Strickland, cond. (Bergsma). LP recording, 1 disc: analog, monaural, 33⅓ 12 in. CRI 131. New York: Composers Recordings Inc., 1960. Reissued as part of Roger Sessions: Symphonies Nos. 1, 2, 3. CD recording, 1 disc: analog/digital, 4¾ in., stereo. CRI Records, CR573. New York: Composers Recordings Inc., 1990. Reissued again on CD as New World Records NWCR573. New York: Recorded Anthology of American Music, Inc., 2007.

== Sources ==
- Anonymous. "Roger Sessions". Theodore Presser website (accessed 29 August 2015).
- Olmstead, Andrea. Roger Sessions: A Biography. New York: Routledge, 2012. ISBN 9781135868925.
- Prausnitz, Frederik. Roger Sessions: How a "Difficult" Composer Got That Way. Oxford and New York: Oxford University Press, 2002. ISBN 0-19-510892-2
- Sessions, Roger. Symphonies Nos. 1, 2, 3. CD recording, 1 disc: digital, 4¾ in., stereo. CRI Records, CR573. New York: Composers Recordings Inc., 1990. Reissued as NWCR573 by Anthology of Recorded Music, Inc., 2007. Cited on DRAM website (accessed 18 August 2015).
