= Phyllis Bryn-Julson =

American opera singer

Phyllis Mae Bryn-Julson (born February 5, 1945) is an American operatic soprano and pedagogue.

A native of Bowdon, North Dakota, Bryn-Julson is one of five children born to Norwegian parents. She initially studied to be a pianist at Concordia College; while there she came to the attention of Gunther Schuller, who was impressed by her ability to sight-read 12-tone music. He persuaded her to study singing at the Berkshire Music Center, where Erich Leinsdorf became a mentor. Further study came at Syracuse University under Helen Boatwright; there she received both her bachelor's degree in music in 1967 and her master's degree of music in voice in 1969.

Bryn-Julson made her official debut with the Boston Symphony Orchestra on October 28, 1966, performing the Lulu Suite of Alban Berg. This marked the beginning of a career in which she was associated largely with the work of modern and contemporary composers such as Milton Babbitt, John Cage, David Del Tredici, Olivier Messiaen, Krzysztof Penderecki, Frank Zappa, George Rochberg, Ned Rorem, and John Tavener. In 1976, she essayed her first operatic role, Malinche in the American premiere of Montezuma by Roger Sessions, under the baton of Sarah Caldwell in Boston. During her career, she collaborated regularly with Pierre Boulez and his Ensemble Intercontemporain. Bryn-Julson's voice is described as possessing both purity and clarity of timbre; possessed as well of perfect pitch, she has a range of three octaves and is noted for her ability to sing even quarter tones accurately. Active as a recording artist, she received a Gramophone Award for Best Opera Recording in 1995 for her performance of Erwartung with Simon Rattle; during her career, she made over 100 recordings. She retired from active singing in 2005.

Bryn-Julson has taught at Kirkland College, the University of Maryland at College Park, and the Peabody Institute, and has given master classes both in the United States and across Europe; she was the first American to give a master class at the Moscow Conservatory. She is married to the organist Donald Sutherland. Her papers are housed at the libraries of Johns Hopkins University.
