= Symphony No. 6 (Sessions) =

The Symphony No. 6 of Roger Sessions, a symphony written using the twelve-tone technique, was composed in 1966. It was commissioned by the state of New Jersey and the New Jersey Symphony Orchestra. The score carries the dedication: "In celebration of the three hundredth anniversary of the state of New Jersey".

== History ==
Sessions began composing the symphony in the summer of 1965 while traveling in South America, and completed it at Tanglewood in 1966. It is the first of a trilogy of symphonies, composed in rapid succession, which Sessions associated with the Vietnam war. The premiere was a disaster, with the finale still incomplete and the first movement played as a finale to make up for this; it was given its first complete performance and its New York premiere by the Juilliard Orchestra conducted by José Serebrier on 4 March 1977. It was published by 1976. The score bears the copyright year 1975.

== Music ==
The symphony is scored for 3 flutes, 3 oboes, 4 clarinets, 3 bassoons, 4 horns, 2 trumpets, 3 trombones, tuba, timpani, percussion, piano, harp, and strings.

It has three movements:

1. Allegro
2. Adagio e tranquillo
3. Allegro moderato

Andrea Olmstead describes all of Sessions's symphonies as "serious" and "funereal".

Richard Swift describes the second movement as "lofty" and ascribes its "profundities to what are essentially simple processes that unwind with a sense of great spaciousness".

== Discography ==
- Roger Sessions: Symphonies 6, 7 & 9. American Composers Orchestra, Dennis Russell Davies, cond. Recorded May 1994, Manhattan Center, New York. CC recording, 1 disc: digital, stereo, 4¾ in. Argo 444 519-2. London: The Decca Record Company Limited, 1995.
