= List of compositions by Larry Thomas Bell =

The following is a complete list of compositions by the American composer Larry Thomas Bell. It was originally compiled by the composer and his wife, the musicologist Andrea Olmstead, cross-referenced with the works listed in his website and The Grove Dictionary of American Music.

Opus no.	Year	Title of work	Instrumentation	Other information
1	1970	Novelette	string quartet	
1a	1970	Novelette	string orchestra	
2	1971	Domination of Black	five solo voices SSATB	text by Wallace Stevens
3	1971	Continuum	orchestra	
4	1972	Mirage	flute and piano	
5	1973	Eclogue	quartet AATB	
6	1973	String Quartet no. 1	string quartet	
7	1974	Variations	solo piano	
8	1975	Reality is an Activity of the Most August Imagination	mezzo-soprano and piano	text by Wallace Stevens
9		The Poems of Our Climate (unfinished)	mezzo-soprano and piano	text by Wallace Stevens
10	1977	Grand Sonata	piano four hands	
11	1976	Three Movements for Solo Cello	solo 'cello	
12	1979	Caprice for solo cello	solo 'cello	
13	1979–1981	The Idea of Order at Key West	soprano, violin, large string orchestra, and percussion	text by Wallace Stevens
14	1981	Prologue and The End of the World	chorus SATB	texts by Archibald MacLeish
15	1983	Miniature Diversions	solo piano	
16	1982	String Quartet no. 2	string quartet	
17	1983	Fantasia on an Imaginary Hymn	'cello and viola	
18	1984	Sleep Song	violin and piano	
19	1984	Incident	baritone and piano	text by Countee Cullen
20	1984	Four Sacred Songs	soprano and piano, also version for mezzo-soprano	old hymn tune texts: “There is a Fountain,” “Take the Name of Jesus With You,” “Stand Up, Stand Up for Jesus,” “Spirit of Love Descend Upon My Heart”
21	1984	Revivals	solo piano	
22	1985	First Tango in London	solo piano	
23	1985	Sacred Symphonies (Symphony no. 1)	orchestra	
24	1985	Celestial Refrain	solo guitar	
25	1986	River of Ponds	'cello and piano	
26	1986	The Evangelical	two pianos four hands	
27	1986	A Sacred Harp	solo harp	
28	1987	The Black Cat	narrator, 'cello, and piano	text by Edgar Allan Poe
29	1987	In Memory of Roger Sessions	solo violin	
30	1988	The Parable of the Parabola	solo piano	
31	1987	The Book of Moonlight	violin and piano	
32	1988	Concerto for Oboe and Five Instruments	oboe solo, violin, viola, cello, double bass, and piano	
33	1989	Piano Concerto	piano solo and chamber orchestra	
34	1990	Piano Sonata no. 1	solo piano	
35	1991	Late Night Thoughts on Listening to Mahler’s Ninth Symphony	narrator/violin and piano	text by Lewis Thomas
36	1992	Piano Quartet	piano, violin, viola, and 'cello	
37	1992	Blues Theme with Variations	two pianos four hands	
38a	1991	What Goes Around Comes Around	flute, oboe, clarinet, viola, 'cello, and piano	
38a	1991	What Goes Around Comes Around	orchestra	last movement of Op. 40
39	1992	Quintessence	woodwind quintet	
40	1994–1996	Idumea Symphony: Symphony no. 2	orchestra	
41	1994	Four Pieces in Familiar Styl	two violins	
42	1995	A Cry Against the Twilight, madrigal for 5 voices	SSATB	text by Wallace Stevens
43	1996	Mahler in Blue Light	alto saxophone, 'cello, and piano	
44	1997	Song and Dance, divertimento for chamber orchestra	chamber orchestra	
45	1997	Sentimental Muse, concerto for bassoon and orchestra	bassoon solo and orchestra	
46	1993–1998	Reminiscences and Reflections, 12 preludes and fugues	piano solo	
47	1997	Short Symphony for Band (Symphony no. 3)	wind ensemble	
48	1998	Harmonium	brass quintet	
49	1999	Two Haiku	soprano, flute, clarinet, violin, cello, and piano	texts by Santoka and Issa
50	1999	Immortal Beloved	mezzo-soprano and piano	texts from letters by Beethoven
51	1999	Caprice no. 2	solo flute	
52	1900	Harmony in Blue and Silver	orchestra	
53	2000	Ten Poems of William Blake	soprano and piano	texts by William Blake
54	2000	Caprice no. 3	solo alto recorder	
55	2000	Songs of Innocence and Experience	children's chorus and orchestra	texts by William Blake
56	2000	Caprice no. 4	solo marimba	
57	2001	Caprice no. 5	solo alto saxophone	
58	2001	Shakespeare Sonnets	tenor or soprano and piano	texts by William Shakespeare
59	2001	Hansel and Gretel	narrator and orchestra	texts from a Grimm fairy tale
60	2001	Four Lyrics	trumpet and piano	
61	2003	Piano Sonata no. 2, Tala	solo piano	
62	2002	Just As I Am	violin and piano	
64	2002	Songs of Time and Eternity	soprano and piano	texts by Emily Dickinson
65	2003	Suite from "Hansel and Gretel"	solo piano	
66	2003	Tarab	double 'cello quartet	
67	2003	Four Chorale Preludes	solo piano	
68	2004	Spirituals, chamber symphony for ten players	instrumental chamber ensemble	
69	2004	Liturgical Suite	solo organ	
70	2011	The Triumph of Lightness, concerto for cello and orchestra	solo 'cello and orchestra	
71	2004	String Quartet no. 3	string quartet	
72	2005	Elegy	solo piano	
73	2005	Caprice no. 6	solo clarinet and optional percussion	
74	2005	Pop Set	double bass and piano	
75	2005	Caprice no. 7	solo vibraphone/narrator	text from "Ovid": Echo and Narcissus
76	2005	Dark Orange Partita	solo viola	
77	2005	Dark Orange Concerto	solo viola and winds	
78	2006	Encores	double 'cello quartet	
79	2006	Dream Within a Dream	soprano and piano, also version for mezzo-soprano	texts by Whitman, Blake, Poe, Dickinson, and Arnold
80	2005	Chorale Prelude: "Holy Ghosts"	wind ensemble	
81	2005	Cabaret Songs for a musical (unfinished)		
82	2006	Music of the Spheres	solo piano	
83	2006	Piano Sonata no. 3, Sonata Macabre	solo piano	
84	2006	Serenade no. 1	guitar trio	
85	2006	Poems	trumpet and piano	
86	2006	Autumnal Raptures	tenor and harp	texts by Elizabeth Kirshner
87	2008	Chorale Fantasia on Unchanging Love	soprano, alto, tenor, and bass soli, chorus and piano	text by Romulus Linney
88	2006	Unchanging Love	brass quintet and organ	
89	2007	David and Old Ironsides	narrator and orchestra	text by Constance Leeds
90	2007	Holy Ghosts, opera in two acts	24 singers and five-piece electric ensemble	libretto by Andrea Olmstead based on the play by Romulus Linney
91	2007	Remembering Al	solo piano	
92	2007	Exaltations of Snowy Stars	mezzo-soprano and piano	texts by Elizabeth Kirshner
93	2007	Duet from Holy Ghosts	soprano, tenor, and piano	
94	2008	Contempo: 10 pieces for piano duet	four-hand piano	
95	2008	Caprice no. 8	solo trumpet	
96	2008	Fifteen Two-Part Inventions	solo piano	
97	2009	Partita no. 1	solo harpsichord	
98	2009	Serenade no. 2	alto recorder, 'cello, and harpsichord	
99	2009	In a Garden of Dreamers	baritone and harpsichord	texts by Elizabeth Kirshner
100	2009	The Fragrant Pathway of Eternity	soprano and guitar	texts by Elizabeth Kirshner
101	2010	The Seasons, a cantata	soprano, mezzo-soprano, tenor, baritone, harp, piano, harpsichord, and guitar	combination of opp. 86, 92, 99, 100, and 108
102	2010	Partita no. 2	solo harpsichord	
103	2010	Psalm 1	SATB chorus and organ	Psalm text: King James Version
104	2010	Psalm 23	tenor and baritone soloists and organ	Psalm text: King James Version
105	2010	Psalm 150	soprano and organ	Psalm text: King James Version
106	2010	Psalm 96	SATB chorus and organ	Psalm text: King James Version
107	2010	Baroque Concerto	alto recorder, harpsichord, 'cello soloists, and strings	
108	2010	The Echolocations of Cellos	soprano, mezzo-soprano, tenor, and baritone voices, harp, piano, harpsichord, and guitar	text by Elizabeth Kirshner
109	2010	Piano Etudes Book 1	solo piano	
110	2010	Cello Suite	'cello and harpsichord (figured bass)	
111	2010	Serenade no. 3	trumpet, tenor saxophone, and piano	
112	2011	Serenade no. 4	clarinet, violin, and piano	
113	2011	Emersonia	SATB chorus a capella	text by Ralph Waldo Emerson
114	2011	Revels: 10 songs	baritone and piano	texts by Ben Jonson
115	2011	INGS	solo piano	
116	2011	Lyric Preludes	solo piano	
117	2012	Fancies: 5 songs	tenor and piano	texts by Thomas Campion
118	2012	Preludes sans Mesurés avec Fugues	solo harpsichord	
119	2011	The Book of Blues: 4 songs	baritone and piano	texts by Larry Bell
120	2013	Songs of Reconciliation	soprano and orchestra or piano	texts by Tran Nhan Tong and Walt Whitman
121	2013	Invocation	congregational singers and piano	
122	2013	Dazzling Duo	tenor saxophone and piano	
123	2014	First Piano Sonatina	solo piano	
124	2014	Gathering Music	solo organ	
125	2014	At the River	soprano and orchestra or piano	
126	2014	Spirit of Love	orchestra	congregational singers and piano
127	2015	Fifteen Three-Part Sinfonias	solo piano	
128	2015	Now Shall My Inward Voice Arise	SATB choir	text by Isaac Watts
129	2015	And Am I Born to Die?	SATB choir	text by Charles Wesley|
130	2015	Second Elegy	trumpet and piano	
131	2015	I'm Just a Poor Wayfaring Stranger	SATB choir	
132	2015	Nine Variations on We Shall Overcome	solo piano	
132a	2016	Nine Variations on We Shall Overcome	solo organ	
133	2015	Remembering Fay	trumpet and orchestra	
134	2014	Song of the Open Road	alto saxophone and strings	
135	2015	First Book of Prayers	solo piano	
136	2016	Response No. 1: The Oversoul	tenor and baritone voices and organ	text by Ralph Waldo Emerson
137	2016	Water Music	baritone voice, double bass, and piano	text by Langston Hughes
138	2016	Newtown Variations	viola and piano	
139	2016	Response No. 2: The Idea of Democracy	tenor and baritone voices and organ	text by Abraham Lincoln
140	2016	Response No. 3: Is not this the fast that I have chosen?	tenor and baritone voices and organ	text from Isaiah 58: 6–12 King James Version
141	2016	Serenade no. 5	clarinet choir	
142	2016	Hymn arrangements: 1. Come, Ye Thankful People Come; 2. Wake Now My Senses, and 3. We Sing Now Together	congregational singers, brass quintet, and organ	
143	2017	First Harpsichord Sonata	solo harpsichord	
144	2017	Once to Every Soul and Nation	SSA choir	text by James Russell Lowell
145	2017	Canons for the Young	solo piano	
146	2017–2020	Piano Etudes Book 2: 12 Polyrhythmic Studies	solo piano	
147	2017	Mass A6	six voices SSSAAA	
148	2017	Prelude and Fugue in f minor	solo organ	
149	2017	Gaslight	baritone and piano	text by Larry Bell
150	2017	Prelude and Fugue in d minor	solo organ	
151	2017	Sonata Sacre	baroque flute and harpsichord	
152	2017	Adagio sostenuto, slow movement from V. Persichetti Symphony for Band arranged for solo piano	solo piano	
153	2018	Harmony in Blue and Silver	wind ensemble	
154	2018	The Lone Wild Bird	alto and piano	text and melody adapted from William Walker's tune “Prospect” from Southern Harmony, 1835
155	2017	Dona Nobis Pacem	string quartet	
156	2018–2019	Twenty-Four Preludes and Fugues	solo piano	
157	2018	Clearing the Clouds from Our Minds	5 percussion instruments, 6 players	
158	2019	Domenica a Filicudi	soprano, viola, and piano	text by Deborah Collins
159	2019	Halcyon Song	voice, 'cello, and piano	text by Larry Bell
160	2019	Awake Our Souls, Away our Fears	congregational singers, brass quintet, and organ	text by Isaac Watts
161	2017	Thou God of Love	SATB choir	text by Isaac Watts
162	2019	O God, Our Help in Ages Past	SATB choir	text by Isaac Watts
163	2019	Blest Are the Sons of Peace	SATB choir	text by Isaac Watts
164	2019	Thou God of Love, Thou Ever Blessed (second version)	SATB choir	text by Isaac Watts
165	2020	Piano Sonata no. 4	solo piano	
166	2020	Piano Sonata no. 5, A Landscape of Small Ruins	solo piano	
167	2019	The Harp at Nature's Advent	SATB choir	text by John Greenleaf Whittier
168	2020	Terza Rima, 12 Variations on “Awake our Souls, Away our Fears,”	solo piano	
169	2019	A Hymnbook for Congregational Singing	congregational singers	combination of opp. 160, 161, 162, 163, 164, and 167
170	2020	Symphony no. 4	soprano, tenor, baritone soloists, SATB chorus, and organ	texts: Psalm 96, Psalm 1, Psalm 23, Psalm 150 King James Version
171	2020	Piano Sonata no. 6	solo piano	
172	2021	Cantata The Bell	soprano solo, SATB chorus, violin, flute, and 'cello	text by Ralph Waldo Emerson
173	2021	Song cycle Parables of Love and Death	alto and tenor soloists and piano	texts by Emily Dickinson
174	2021	Piano Sonata no. 7 Southern Meditations	solo piano	
175	2021	Chorale Fantasy and Fugue in e minor	solo organ	
177	2021	Prelude and Fugue in D major	solo organ	
178	2021	Prelude and Fugue in c minor	solo organ	
179	2021	Third Elegy, In Memory of KEO	solo piano	
180	2021	Prelude and Fugue in E major	solo organ	
181	2021	The Shadows Fall So Gently	congregational singers	
182	2021	Prelude and Fugue in Eb major	solo organ	
184	2021	Prelude and Fugue in A major	solo organ	
185	2021	Prelude and Fugue in B minor	solo organ	
186	2021	Prelude and Fugue in F major	solo organ	
187	2021	Prelude and Fugue in C major	solo organ	
189	2022	Postcard from Ukraine	solo piano	
192	2023	A Brief History of Brooklyn and The Screening Room	solo piano	
194	2023	Serenade no. 6	flute, cello, and piano	
195	2021	Prelude and Fugue in a minor	solo organ	
196	2024	String Quartet no. 4, Epiphany	string quartet	
197	2024	The Prism of the Lyre	soprano and piano	text by Mary Collins
198	2024	Three Chorale Sonatas	solo cello	
201	2025	Piano Sonata no. 8 I’m going home	solo piano	
204	2025	Mayor Wu’s Pavane and Galliard	solo (portative) organ	
