= Siegfried Czapski =

German physicist

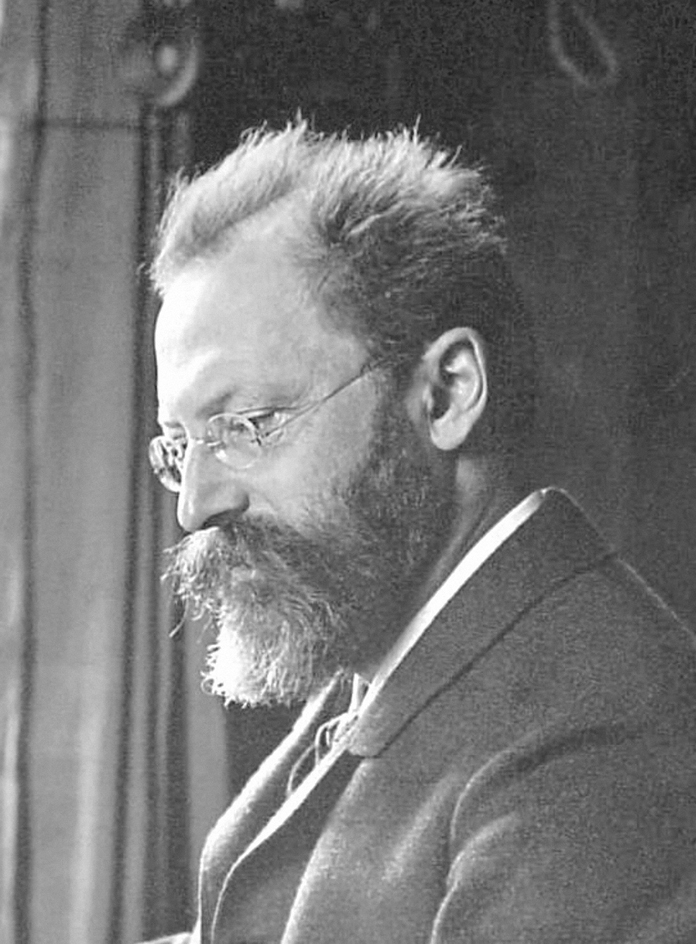
Siegfried Czapski

Siegfried Czapski (28 May 1861 – 29 June 1907) was a German physicist and optician.

== Childhood, school and university in Breslau (1870–1881) ==
Czapski was the son of Simon Czapski (1826–1908) and his wife Rosalie Goldenring (1830-1916) on the Obra estate near Koschmin in the Province of Posen. His family was Jewish, and he was related to the physician Albert Neisser. In 1870 Czapski's father suffered a serious accident which left him unable to work. The family sold their estate and moved to Breslau (Wrocław) where, in 1872, eleven-year-old Czapski began attending school at the Maria Magdalenen Gymnasium. In 1879 he completed his university entrance examination (together with Wilhelm Prausnitz, Richard Reitzenstein and Felix Skutsch) and spent a semester studying at the University of Göttingen, attending lectures by Eduard Riecke (physics), Moritz Abraham Stern (mathematics) and Rudolf Hermann Lotze (philosophy). At the start of his second semester he switched to the University of Breslau, studying physics under Oskar Emil Meyer, Ernst Dorn and Felix Auerbach, mathematics under Jakob Rosanes and philosophy under Jacob Freudenthal. It was during this period that he embarked on a friendship with Arthur Heidenhain (1862–1941) which led to a lifelong exchange of letters.

== University and doctorate in Berlin (1881–1884) ==
In 1881 Czapski switched to the University of Berlin to study under the physicists Hermann von Helmholtz and Gustav Robert Kirchhoff. Here he met Leopold Loewenherz and became interested in experimental physics, which prompted him to start attending more practical, hands-on courses. In 1882 Czapski began work for the Normal-Eichungskommission (Imperial Institute for Weights and Measures) which was headed by the astronomer Wilhelm Julius Foerster. In the autumn of that year he worked on his doctorate under the supervision of Hermann von Helmholtz, in which he conducted experiments to investigate one of Helmholtz's own theories. He submitted his doctoral thesis to Helmholtz and Kirchhoff in November 1883. In December he embarked on his doctoral exams which were held by Helmholtz and Kirchhoff in physics, Leopold Kronecker in mathematics and Eduard Zeller in philosophy. In February 1884 he took his Rigorosum oral examination (doctoral viva) to complete his doctorate.

== Technical optics: Carl Zeiss in Jena (1884 onwards) ==
His interest in physical and technical optics (the design and fabrication of optics) enabled him to gain a position at Carl Bamberg's workshop for scientific precision instruments (subsequently known as the Askania works). Keen to explore these areas in more depth, he approached Ernst Abbe from the Zeiss works in Jena. Abbe soon appointed Czapski as his assistant – a post he held until 1886 – and involved him in his discussions with the physicist Leonhard Sohncke from the University of Jena. As Abbe's assistant, Czapski maintained a relatively loose connection to Zeiss as a company and continued to accept work from Bamberg, but all that changed in 1886 when he was hired to work full-time at Zeiss, becoming Abbe's most trusted employee with the approval of Carl and Roderich Zeiss).

Abbe involved Czapski in his theoretical studies as early as 1885. It was Czapski who went on to publish these studies the following year because Abbe himself had neither the time nor the patience, being too occupied with his development projects. In 1893, after five years of work, Czapski finally completed his contribution to Adolf Winkelmann's Handbuch der Physik (Encyclopedia of physics) entitled Theorie der optischen Instrumente nach Abbe (Theory of optical instruments according to Abbe). The 300-page work was issued that very same year as a separate publication from volume II of the encyclopedia and was hailed as a key work in the field of technical optics.

Working with Abbe and Otto Schott in Jena and with Leopold Dippel in Darmstadt, Czapski was involved in the design and fabrication of new microscope optical systems from the moment he started work in Jena. He subsequently worked on the technical implementation of a binocular microscope based on ideas put forward by the American biologist Horatio S. Greenough. As the company expanded, so too did its range of products: Zeiss started producing photographic objectives in 1890, optical measuring instruments in 1892/93, prism binoculars in 1893/94 (a development based on significant input from Czapski), astronomical instruments in 1897 and image measuring devices in 1901.

Czapski steadily took on more and more responsibility as Zeiss increased its product portfolio and workforce and as its fame spread far beyond the borders of Germany. In 1891 he became one of the company's three managing directors.

== Establishment of the Carl-Zeiss-Stiftung ==
Founded in 1889 by Abbe, the Carl-Zeiss-Stiftung (Carl Zeiss Foundation) took the entire Zeiss company and half of the Schott company under its wing in 1891. Czapski was subsequently appointed as an authorized representative of the Foundation. Working closely with Abbe and a foundation inspector from the Grand-Ducal Saxon State Ministry in Weimar (initially Karl Rothe and from 1899 onwards the Government Privy Council Max Vollert), Czapski played an ever greater role in managing the company, something that took an increasing toll on his health. Abbe already had the university trustee Heinrich Eggeling and the lawyer Eduard Rosenthal involved in drawing up the Foundation statutes and he soon included Czapski in that task – even though by this point Czapski was increasingly overwhelmed by concerns and problems relating to the workforce. Work on the statutes was completed in 1895/96.

== Siegfried and Margarete Czapski ==
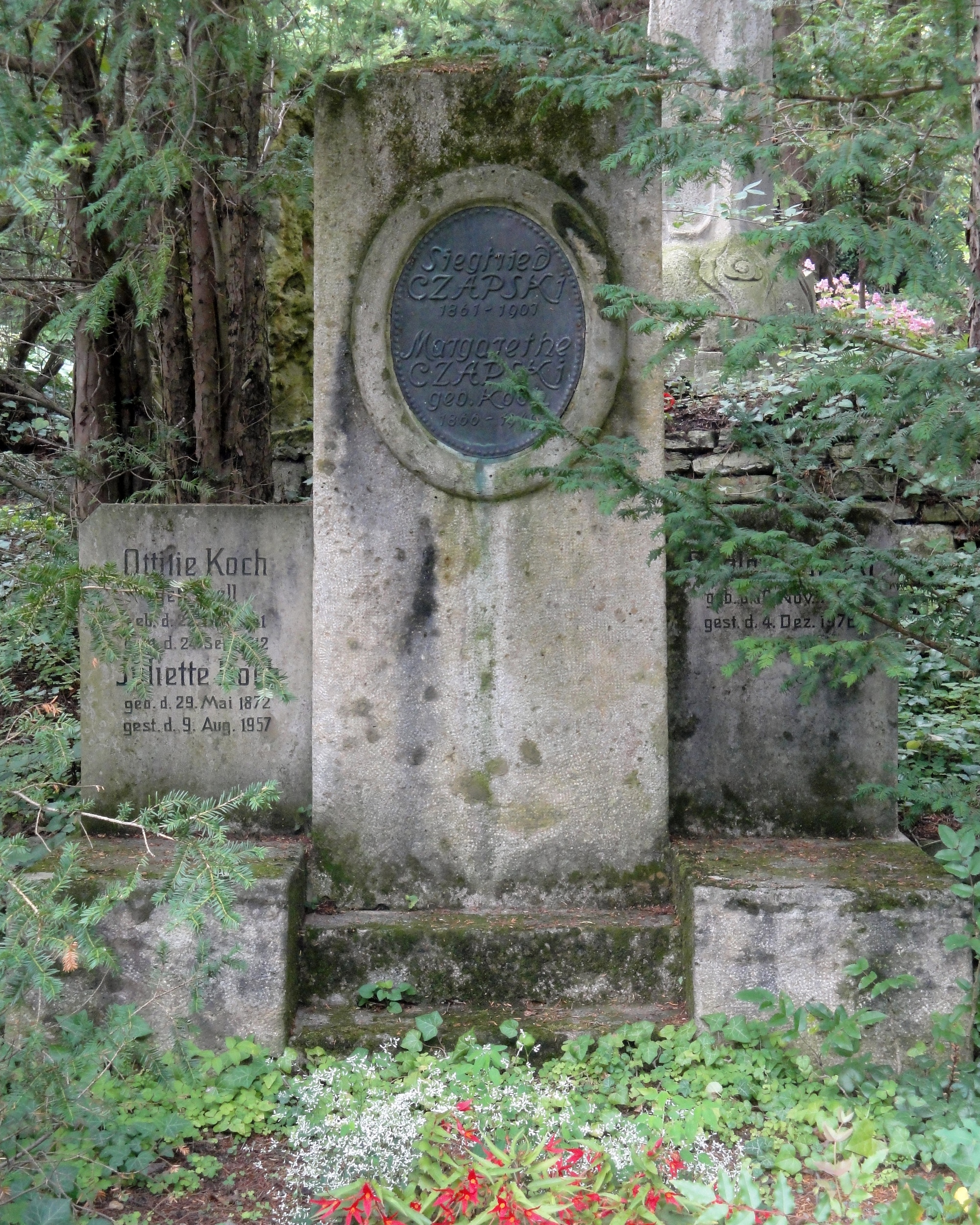
Grave of Siegfried Czapski in Jena

In 1885 Czapski's life changed dramatically when he met and fell in love with Margarete Koch. Margarete (officially spelled Marguerite) was the granddaughter of Abbe's teacher, the mathematician and physicist Karl Snell. Margarete's father was a professor at a grammar school in Paris and a nephew of Juliette Drouet, who was Victor Hugo's partner for much of his life. His wife Ottilie Koch (née Snell) often brought their daughter to visit her father in Jena. Ottilie was also the sister of Abbe's wife, Else Abbe. It was inevitable that 24-year-old Czapski and 19-year-old Margarete Koch would eventually meet. Just weeks after getting to know each other they got engaged, secretly at first. They agreed that they would marry when Margarete turned 21. The wedding took place on 11 August 1887.

Their marriage produced eight children:

- 1888 Charlotte ("Lotte")
- 1889 Hans
- 1891-1968 Helene, married name Holzman
- 1892 Ewald
- 1894 Elisabeth, married Wilhelm Flitner
- 1896 Dorothea
- 13 July 1902 Reinhardt
- 22 December 1903 Anna-Maria ("Anni")

Czapski had long been suffering from ill health, and his huge workload made the situation even more difficult. On 29 June in Weimar he died of a pulmonary embolism due to complications after an appendectomy. Having been the close working companion of his friend and mentor Ernst Abbe, and ultimately his successor, Czapski was only destined to outlive Abbe by a mere two-and-a-half years.

== Honor ==
A street in Jena, near the Carl Zeiss works, is named after him: Siegfried-Czapski-Straße, a few blocks off Zeiss Promenade.

== Publications ==
His most important publication was Theorie der optischen Instrumente, nach Abbe (Breslau: Trewendt, 1893).
