= Horatio S. Greenough =

American zoologist and microscope inventor

- Born: Henry Saltonstall Greenough; May 11, 1845; Bad Gräfenberg, Austrian Silesia (today Lázně Jeseník, Czech Republic)
- Died: April 2, 1916 (aged 70); Neuilly-sur-Seine, France
- Known for: Stereo microscopes

Horatio Saltonstall Greenough (May 11, 1845 – April 2, 1916) was an American zoologist who invented the Greenough-style stereo microscope, which was named after him.

== Biography ==
Greenough was born with the name of Henry Saltonstall, in Bad Gräfenberg, in what was then Austrian Silesia, and is now called Lázně Jeseník in the Czech Republic. His parents came from Boston in the Commonwealth of Massachusetts. His father Horatio Greenough (1805–1852) was one of the first significant sculptors in the US. His mother was Louisa (Eliza) Ingersoll Gore (1812–1891). The couple lived in Florence for a few years to study classics and the Renaissance Sculpture. To recuperate, they stayed several times at the water cure sanatorium Vincenz Prießnitz in Bad Gräfenberg, where their son Henry Saltonstall, who later became known as Horatio S. Greenough, was born.

During the first years of his life, the family had to endure health problems. It was not until October 1851 that Henry came to the US with his parents and younger sisters Mary Louise (1847–1854) and Charlotte (1850–1919). His father died a year later. His mother changed Henry's first name to Horatio after his father's death. As the family lived in Cambridge, Boston near Harvard University, Horatio got to know university lecturers such as the zoologist Louis Agassiz, who awakened his interest in natural sciences and zoology in particular. There are no reliable sources about his school days and first years of study in Europe. It is known that he returned to Boston in 1866 presumably with his qualification and to took courses at Massachusetts Institute of Technology (MIT, then Boston Tech) in different subjects (including civil engineering, chemistry, mineralogy, astronomy, experimental physics), however not emerging with any qualification. He then worked at a bank and as a real estate salesman, probably at the instigation of his commercially active uncle Henry. He met the future president of Harvard University on Boston's State Street on Abbott Lawrence Lowell, became friends with him for the rest of his life and corresponded with the legal expert about politics.

Horatio S. Greenough lived in Paris from 1886. He initially trained in histology there, studied various marine organisms on the Atlantic coast and improved optical instruments. He died in 1916 in Neuilly-sur-Seine, a suburb of Paris.

== Works ==
Horatio S. Greenough founded the Mathematical and Physical Club in Boston in 1883 jointly with A. Lawrence and his brother, the astronomist, Percival Lowell. Scientists from Harvard University met there three years after mathematician and astronomer Benjamin Peirce died. Horatio S. Greenough spent his entire life studying the ideas and mathematical literature of the time. In his later years, he tried unsuccessfully to be recognized with his theses by Ernst Abbe, John Lubbock, 1st Baron Avebury and Henri Poincaré. However, Horatio S. Greenough's main interest was in zoology. In the summer of 1885, he stayed in Cotuit, a district of Barnstable on the peninsula of Cape Cod. He described his observations there in his first scientific publication, “Observations on Young Humming-Birds”, published in 1886 in The American Naturalist.

From 1887 to 1889, he worked in the histology laboratory and studied at the French National Museum of Natural History (MNHN). In 1889, he was a student of C. H. Georges Pouchet (1833-1894), professor of comparative anatomy at the MNHN. It was here that he learned about additional equipment for microscopy and about the working method that was important for his decisive achievements with Laurent Chabry (1855-1894) whereby the experimenter should be able to modify his instruments and occasionally construct them himself. Laurent Chabry's ideas inspired his prototype of the capillary rotator, which allowed him to rotate early developmental stages of marine organisms around an axis and observe them through a monocular microscope with high magnification. His own idea of the prism rotator made it possible to observe larger organisms at low magnification without having to hold or move them mechanically. He succeeded in establishing these two secondary apparatuses as products of the Carl Zeiss Jena company.

After a visit to the zoologist Charles Otis Whitman in Chicago, Horatio S. Greenough wrote to the physicist Ernst Abbe of Carl Zeiss in July 1892, expressing his desire for a two-tube microscope that could image an object true to space. The Carl Zeiss company was regarded as a leading in the manufacture of microscopes. Ernst Abbe was world-famous as a professor at Jena University and for the scientifically based production of microscopes. As a scientist, Abbe was not only in a position to understand and further develop Horatio S. Greenough's concept, but as managing director of Carl Zeiss he was also in a position to effect the technical development of this new type of microscope together with his personal assistant Siegfried Czapski. The latter mentioned the term “orthomorphic microscope” for the first time and formulated the condition: "The image must appear in all its parts in each microscope tube from the eye point at the same angles as the object from the point of intersection of the main rays."

A first prototype of the Greenough microscope was produced after a personal meeting with Abbe at the end of 1893 in Jena and sent to him in Paris in March 1894. Horatio S. Greenough immediately judged it saying, “I have tried it and find it an improvement on anything I have yet seen, but I do not consider it a practical solution of my problem - !” He disapproved of the binoculars Abbe's Porro prisms, which ensured adjustment to the interpupillary distance and laterally and vertically correct images. He wanted to achieve the latter with a second pair of lenses as a further imaging step, which he hoped would create continuous lines of sight between the object and the eyes, which he considered indispensable for manipulating the object. He also wanted very small pinhole apertures to increase the depth of field, which would have inevitably reduced the resolution and made an intensive light source necessary.

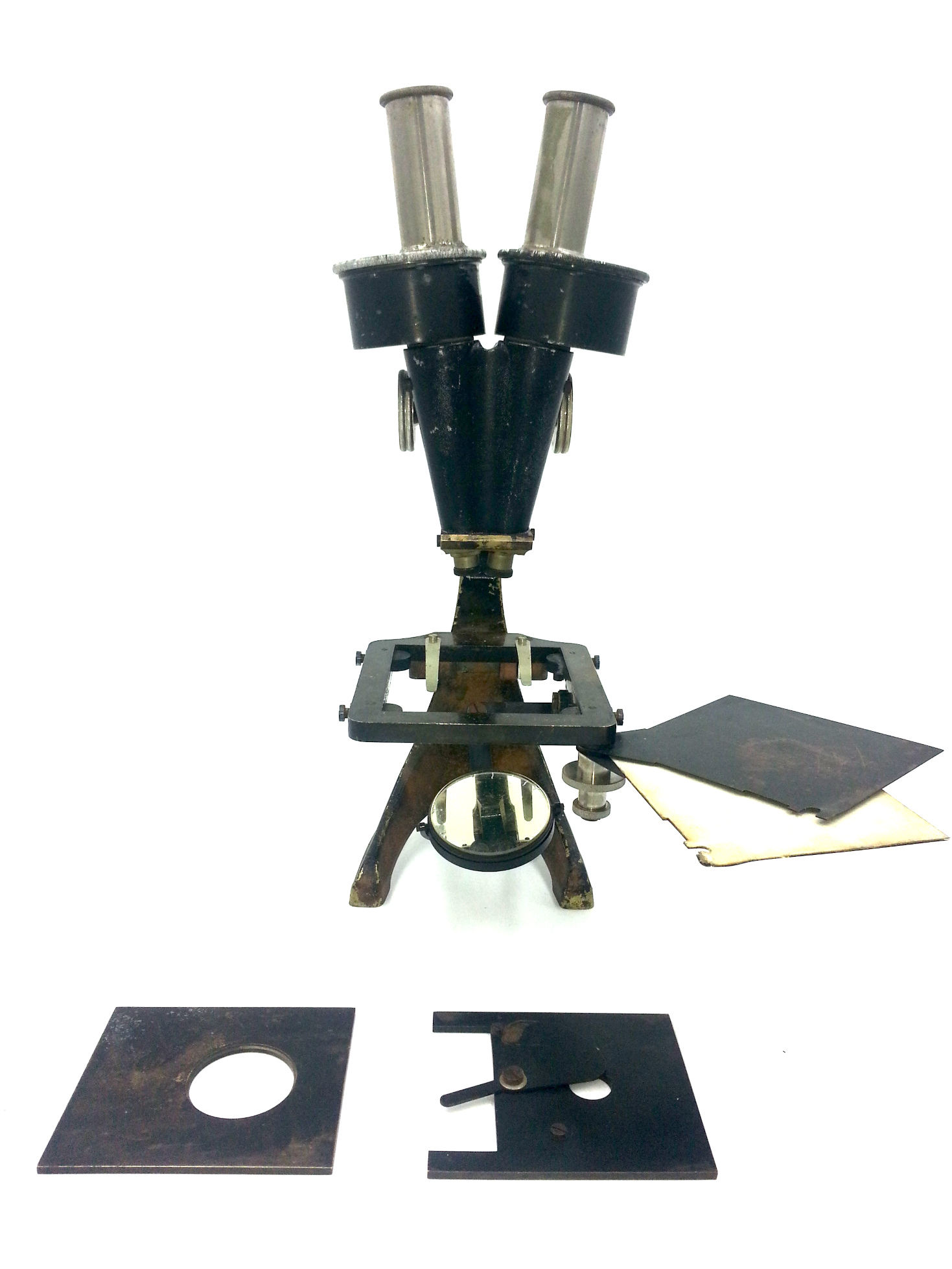
Stereomicroscope pre-production model from 1897, front view.

By this time Siegfried Czapski was one of the managing directors at Carl Zeiss Jena and when he brought a specimen of the stereomicroscope pre-series (see diagram) to Horatio S. Greenough in Paris in May 1897, the verdict was again critical ("the instrument no longer merits its name of Orthomorphic Microscope") with the express wish that "the present Orthomorphic Microscope must undergo some modifications of construction".

However, since the instrument was about to be launched in its commercial version (the instrument was advertised in the catalog in 1898), this crucial assessment inevitably led to tension between Horatio S. Greenough and the company Carl Zeiss Jena. Greenough stated, "I say this with all deference but there is a decided difference of opinion between us upon this point." He refused to have his name associated with the instrument in any way. Even a copy modified for him in October 1901 could not dissuade him. However, these troubles did not prevent the first binocular stereomicroscopes from being successfully marketed by the Carl Zeiss Jena company between 1897 and 1902, and special variations were developed for dermatology and ophthalmology.

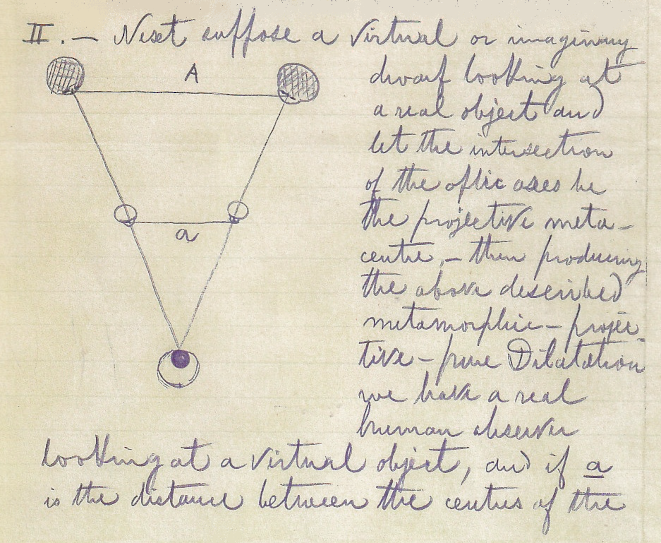
Copy of an excerpt from a letter from Horatio S. Greenough to Carl Zeiss Jena from 1901.

On April 6, 1901, Horatio S. Greenough finalized the " Geometrical Theory of the Orthomorphic Microscope" and sent it to Carl Zeiss Jena. In this geometric theory, projection lines start from the 'C metacenter' and are tangent to the object outline. Due to the angles between these lines, lengthening them increases their distances and so the object shadow undergoes a projective widening (dilation, dilatation D). This simple geometric relationship is followed by the "dwarf parable" of orthomorphism introduced by Greenough (see diagram): “Next suppose a virtual or imaginary dwarf looking at a real object and let the intersection of the optic axes be the projective metacentre [sic], - then producing the above described metamorphic-projective-pure Dilatation we have a real human observer looking at a virtual object, and if a is the distance between the centres of the pupils of the Dwarf and A that between the centres of the pupils of the real human observer we get of course (1) A/a=D and the extremities of A and a are situated upon a pair of straight lines radiating from the projective metacentre C.”

Siegfried Czapski as Greenough's contact person has been replaced by Moritz von Rohr. He interpreted the "dwarf parable" in his work "Vision" and later led to the product of Carl Zeiss Jena, the now very successful stereomicroscope: "However, the parity of viewpoints that H. S. Greenough required to conform with his correct theory was not always achieved. This is because its realization in the existing optical systems had serious shortcomings as the demand for a homeomorphic image was generally not great thus the Zeiss workshop generally refrained from meeting this requirement." Despite his claim to be a 'man of science', "Greenough's lasting contribution to science was not new knowledge, but new practices. In this respect, the few publications he has published contain valuable information about the process that gave rise to his idea for a stereoscopic binocular instrument that enables three-dimensional depth perception when working with larger microscopic specimens."

== Publications ==
- Horatio Saltonstall Greenough (1891), "Observations sur les larves d'oursin", Bulletin de la Société zoologique de France, vol. 16, p. 239
- Horatio Saltonstall Greenough (1892), "Sur les homologies des premières stades suivant la segmentation chez les batraciens", Bulletin de la Société zoologique de France, vol. 17, pp. 57–59
