= Concerto for Orchestra (Sessions) =

Composition by Roger Sessions

The Concerto for Orchestra is a composition for orchestra by the American composer Roger Sessions. The work was commissioned by the Boston Symphony Orchestra and premiered October 23, 1981, with conductor Seiji Ozawa leading the Boston Symphony Orchestra. The concerto was Sessions's last orchestral composition and won him the 1982 Pulitzer Prize for Music. Sessions had previously won a special lifetime achievement Pulitzer Prize in 1974 "for his life's work as a distinguished American composer." The piece was honored with a performance at the closing of the 50th Tanglewood Music Festival in 2014.

== Reception ==
Andrew Porter, writing in The New Yorker, praised the work, saying, "One ascends it with animated tread, moves with slow wonder across its central reach, speeds again toward its close, and at the end pauses for a moment, quietly rapt, to consider both the journey made and the realms to which it may lead."

== Sources ==
- Johnston, Blair (2005). Woodstra, Chris; Brennan, Gerald; Schrott, Allen (eds.). All Music Guide to Classical Music: The Definitive Guide to Classical Music. Backbeat Books. ISBN 0-87930-865-6.
