= Wilhelm Prausnitz =

Wilhelm Prausnitz (January 1, 1861 in Glogau – September 11, 1933 in Munich) was a hygiene specialist.

In 1879 he completed his university entrance examination together with Siegfried Czapski, Richard Reitzenstein and Felix Skutsch.

A full professor since 1899 of hygiene and was head of the hygiene institute; the dean of the medical school at Graz, Austria, as well as a Privy Counsellor.

His grandson Frederik William Prausnitz (1920-2004) was a conductor and teacher.

Prausnitz, his son, rejected the Nazi regime.
