= Renée Longy =

French-American music theorist and pedagogue

Renée Longy-Miquelle (1897–1979) was a French-American pianist, music theorist, and noted pedagogue who served as a faculty member of the Juilliard School, the Curtis Institute of Music, and the Peabody Conservatory. She was the teacher of many seminal students, including Leonard Bernstein and Michael Jeffrey Shapiro.

== Life and career ==
Renee Longy was born at juny 14th 1897 in Paris, France, to Georges Longy and Marie Anne Geneviève PESSARD. At the age of four, she won the Pleyel Grand Piano Prize. Renee studied piano and eurhythmics at the Paris Conservatory under pianist Maurice Dumesnil and composers Alfredo Casella and Jean d’Udine. She moved with her family to the United States in 1914, when her father became the first oboist of the Boston Symphony Orchestra. During this time, Longy also gave piano performances with various artists throughout the Northeast.

Longy founded the Longy School of Music with her father in 1915 and later replaced her father as director of the school from 1925 to 1926, where she brought over several faculty from the Boston Symphony and established Dalcroze eurhythmics in the school.

Longy began teaching eurhythmics and solfège at the New England Conservatory of Music. In 1926, she acquired a faculty position at the Curtis Institute of Music. At Curtis, Longy founded XX Century Music Group to showcase new classical music. She taught Leonard Bernstein score reading from 1940 to 1941, and they developed a close relationship. Longy taught at the Peabody Conservatory from 1943 to 1951 before joining the School of Music of the University of Miami faculty.

Starting in 1963, Longy served as a member of the Literature and Materials Faculty at the Juilliard School of Music (now the Juilliard School) to teach music theory and solfège, a position she would hold until her death in 1979. At Juilliard, Longy developed a reputation for her rigorous and classical teaching methods, drilling students in dictation. She taught instrumental and vocal students solfége for two years, and conductors and composers pitch, clefs, and rhythm for four years.

The Philharmonic Hall (home of the New York Philharmonic) celebrated Longy's 50th anniversary of teaching with a banquet in 1964 and she was awarded the Handel and Haydn Society Medal in 1974.

Former students of Renée Longy include Leonard Bernstein, James Conlon, Rose Bampton, Jack Druckman, Jacob Lateiner, Leonard Rose, Elliott Carter, Larry Thomas Bell, William Schimmel and Michael Jeffrey Shapiro, among others.

== Bibliography ==
- Music Fundamentals. Philadelphia Pa: Elkan Vogel Co; 1936.
- Principles of Musical Theory. Boston: E.C. Schirmer; 1953.
