= Karl Kritz =

Austrian conductor (1906–1969)

Karl Kritz (1906 – 17 December 1969) was an Austrian conductor. Born in Vienna, he sang in the Vienna Boys Choir as a child. He studied with Franz Schmidt at the University of Music and Performing Arts, Vienna. After graduating, he pursued further studies in conducting in Nuremberg and Berlin. He immigrated to the United States in 1937 where he became assistant conductor of the Pittsburgh Symphony Orchestra and music director of the Pittsburgh Youth Symphony Orchestra, and was active as a guest conductor with organizations like the American Opera Society, the Pittsburgh Opera, the San Francisco Opera, and the Utah Symphony among others.

From 1946 to 1949 Kritz worked on the conducting staff of the Metropolitan Opera. In 1949, he joined the faculty of Texas Christian University where he directed the opera program for the next decade. He was also involved with establishing the Fort Worth Opera and conducted many of their productions during the late 1940s and early 1950s. In 1960, he was appointed the first music director of the Syracuse Symphony Orchestra where he remained until his death nine years later.
