= The Syracuse Orchestra =

American co-operative orchestra

The Syracuse Orchestra is a full-time, musician-led, co-operative professional orchestra in Syracuse, New York, United States, founded in 2012. Its main performance venue is the Oncenter Crouse Hinds Theater in downtown Syracuse.

== History ==
The former Syracuse Symphony Orchestra filed for chapter 7 bankruptcy in 2011. Symphoria was launched as a 501(c)(3) nonprofit in 2012 as a musician-led cooperative.

After locally broadcasting concerts during the pandemic, Symphoria launched their 2022-23, tenth anniversary season with a return to in-person concerts.

On February 17, 2024, Symphoria announced it was changing its name to The Syracuse Orchestra.
