= Symphony No. 5 (Sessions) =

The Symphony No. 5 of Roger Sessions was commissioned in 1960 and completed in 1964. It was commissioned by Eugene Ormandy and the Philadelphia Orchestra, and the first movement only was premiered by them in February 1964, the rest not being completed until that December.

It is in three connected movements, with a pause after the first.

It is scored for three flutes, three oboes, four clarinets, three bassoons, four horns, two trumpets, three trombones, one tuba, timpani, percussion, piano, harp and strings.

Andrea Olmstead describes all of Sessions's symphonies as "serious" and "funereal", with No. 5 being one of four with "quiet reflective endings."

== Discography ==
- Roger Sessions: Symphony No. 4, Symphony No. 5, Rhapsody for Orchestra. Columbus Symphony Orchestra, Christian Badea, cond. Recorded April 6, 1986, at the Ohio Theatre, Columbus Ohio. LP recording, 1 disc: digital, stereo, 12 in. New World NW 345-1; CD recording, 1 disc: digital, stereo, 4¾ in. New World NW 345-2. New York: Recorded Anthology of American Music, 1987.
