= Pittsburgh Youth Symphony Orchestra =

- Youth orchestra
- Founded: 1945; 81 years ago
- Location: Pittsburgh, Pennsylvania, United States
- Concert hall: Heinz Hall
- Website: pyso.org

The Pittsburgh Youth Symphony Orchestra is one of the oldest youth orchestra programs in the United States, having performed its first concert under the direction of Stanley H. Levin in 1945 at Carnegie Music Hall in the Oakland neighborhood of Pittsburgh, PA. The idea of an independent youth orchestra in Pittsburgh originated with the student musicians that participated in the Music Festival of the In-and-About Pittsburgh Music Educators Club. It is most often represented by its initials, PYSO, affectionately pronounced “Pie-So” by members, alumni and supporters.

The first president of the Pittsburgh Youth Symphony Orchestra was Vira I. Heinz (sister-in-law of Howard Heinz) who held that position until 1981. After a brief hiatus (1948 to 1953) the orchestra was reorganized by Mrs. Heinz and Marie Maazel, mother of conductor Lorin Maazel. Karl Kritz, assistant conductor with the Pittsburgh Symphony Orchestra, became music director. Rehearsals and concerts were held at Pittsburgh's Soldiers and Sailors Memorial Hall until 1971, when the Loew's Penn Theater in downtown Pittsburgh was renovated and renamed Heinz Hall. At that time the Pittsburgh Youth Symphony Orchestra became affiliated with the Pittsburgh Symphony Orchestra. PYSO made its home at Heinz Hall, at which it gives four free concerts a year, but it also undertakes international tours.

== Music directors ==
- Stanley H. Levin (1945–1948)
- Karl Kritz (1954–1962)
- Herbert Grossman (1962–1963)
- Haig Yaghjian (1963–1965)
- Ronald Ondrejka (1965–1966)
- Phillip Spurgeon (1966–1969)
- Michael Semanitzky (1969–1976)
- Thomas Michalak (1976–1978)
- Victoria Bond (1978–1980)
- Michael Lankester (1980–1986)
- Andreas Delfs (1986–1988)
- Stephan Lano (1988–1991)
- Barbara Yahr (1991–1994)
- Arthur Post (1994–1997)
- Edward Cumming (1997–2002)
- Daniel Meyer (2002–2009)
- Lawrence Loh (2009–2015)
- Francesco Lecce-Chong (2015–2018)
- Earl Lee (2018–2021)
- Jacob Joyce (2022–present)

In recent years, the music director has been the associate conductor of the Pittsburgh Symphony Orchestra.

== World premieres ==
World premieres have included John Anthony Lennon’s “Suite of Fables” (1991), Morton Gould’s “The Jogger and the Dinosaur” (1993), Morton Gould's “Hosedown” (1995), David Stock’s “Clarinet Concerto” (2005), and John Harbison’s “Mary Lou” in 2009. PYSO has presented the Pittsburgh premieres of Samuel Coleridge Taylor's Ballade for Orchestra, and Pavel Haas's Scherzo Triste, Jennifer Higdon's Teton Range from All Things Majestic. They also presented the Pittsburgh Premiere of Mothership by Mason Bates, with a musician dressed up as an alien to play the electronics. In 2026, PYSO presented the world premiere of Elegy for a Heroic Soul by Athanasios Stogiannidis in the Ancient Theatre of Philippi accompanied by the Kavala Youth Choir.

== Soloists ==
International soloists who have appeared with the Pittsburgh Youth Symphony Orchestra include Richard Stoltzman (2005) and Roberta Peters (1977). PYSO holds an annual concerto competition where winners perform their concerto with the orchestra. Previous winners include cellist Albert Dong, playing Dvorak Cello Concerto, harpist Sophia Jho, playing Ravel's Introduction and Allegro, violinist Jeongwoo Cheon playing Introduction and Rondo Capriccioso by Saint-Saëns, and concertmaster Karin Hoppo playing Violin Concerto (Sibelius).

== Prominent alumni ==
Many PYSO alumni have won positions in major symphony orchestras, including those in orchestras of Boston, New York, Chicago, Cleveland, Philadelphia, and Pittsburgh. Others have gone on to solo and chamber music careers, as well as teaching positions at colleges, universities, public and private schools, and private studios. Prominent alumni include: Dale Clevenger (principal horn of the Chicago Symphony Orchestra), Joshua Gindele (cellist in the Miro Quartet), Todd Phillips and Daniel Phillips (violinists in the Orion String Quartet), Jesse Rosen (trombone player and executive vice president and managing director of the League of American Orchestras), and David Stock (trumpet player and composer).

== Festivals and touring ==
PYSO has participated in numerous festivals and tours. These include:

- World's Fair in New York City (1964)
- World's Fair in Knoxville (1982)
- Expo ’67 in Montreal (1967)
- Bicentennial River Tour (1975)
- Three Rivers Arts Festival
- Aberdeen International Youth Orchestra Festival in Scotland (1987)
- International Youth Orchestra Festivals in Austria (1977) and Switzerland (1972)
- National Youth Orchestra Festival in Sarasota, Fla. (2002), Interlochen, Mich. (1998), and Washington, D.C. (1977)
- International Tour of Hungary, Austria, Czech Republic, and Germany (2005)
- National Festival of States, Washington, D.C. (2006)
- Concert Tour of China (2008)
- Concert Tour of Italy as part of the Florence Youth Orchestra Festival and the Festival Ultrapadum (2011)
- Concert Tour of Austria, Czech Republic, and Slovakia (2014)
- Concert Tour Portugal (2023)
- Concert Tour of Greece (2026)
