= Symphony No. 2 (Sessions) =

The Symphony No. 2 of Roger Sessions was begun in 1944 and completed in 1946.

It is in four movements:

1. Molto agitato – Tranquillo e misterioso (D minor – all keys are "more or less".)
2. Allegretto capriccioso (F minor)
3. Adagio tranquillo ed espressivo (B♭ minor)
4. Allegramente (D major)

The symphony is dedicated "To the Memory of Franklin Delano Roosevelt", who died while Sessions was composing the Adagio tranquillo. The score is dated "Princeton-Gambier-Berkeley, 1944–46" – it was begun in Princeton, work continued at Kenyon College in Gambier, Ohio, and finished at the University of California at Berkeley.

Though the work was originally commissioned by the Ditson Fund of Columbia University, the premiere, under Pierre Monteux and the San Francisco Symphony, took place 9–11 January 1947. This performance was not well received, and reviewer Marjory M. Fisher opined that "it seemed to express the epitome of all that is worst in the life and thinking of today." It received its New York City premiere three years later, on January 12, 1950.

Sessions provided the following program note: “With reasonable accuracy it may be considered as in the Key of D minor—the movements being in D minor, F minor, B♭ minor, and D major respectively. The subject of tonality is complex and even problematical nowadays, and if I use terms which I myself find inadequate to the facts of contemporary music, it is because they express certain essentials more satisfactorily than any others I know.

“Those who would like a clue to what is sometimes called the 'emotional content' I would refer to the tempo indications of the various movements, which give a fair idea of the character of each—though the hearer may perhaps feel that the Adagio is predominantly dark and somber, and find that the last movement is interrupted, at its climax, by a blare of trombones, introducing an episode which contrasts sharply with the rest of the movement, which returns to its original character only gradually. As composer of this work I do not wish to go beyond this; to do so would imply a kind of commitment and could be taken to indicate conscious intentions which did not exist. The music took the shape it had to take—I strove, as I always do, to be simply the obedient and willing servant of my musical ideas. But it must be remembered always, I think, that for a composer musical ideas have infinitely more substance, more reality, more-specific meaning, and a more vital connection with experience than any words that could be found to describe them.”

Andrea Olmstead describes all of Sessions's symphonies as "serious" and "funereal".

== Recordings ==
1. Dimitri Mitropoulos/Philharmonic-Symphony Orchestra of New York (Columbia Masterworks 10-inch LP ML 2120, monaural, 1950; reissued on Composers Recordings Inc., 12-inch LP CRI SD 278, 1972; reissued on CD, CRI CD 573, 1990)
2. Herbert Blomstedt/San Francisco Symphony (London CD, 1994)
