= Roger Sessions =

American composer, critic, and teacher of music (1896–1985)

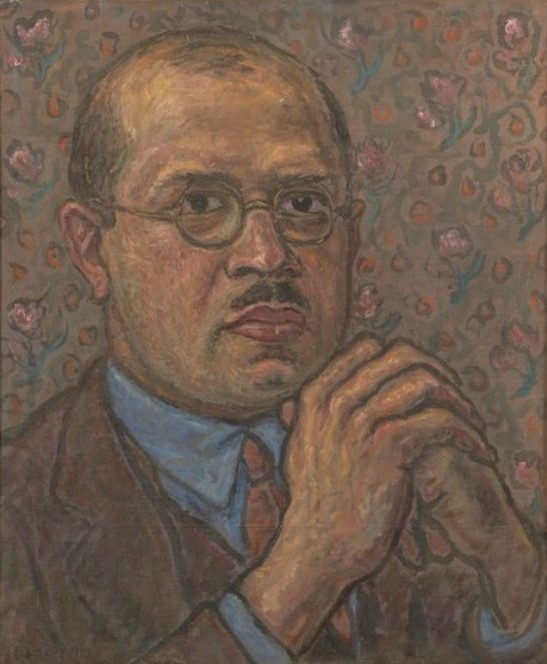
- Portrait of Sessions by Harold Weston (c. 1920s)
- Born: December 28, 1896; New York, New York, U.S.
- Died: March 16, 1985 (aged 88); Princeton, New Jersey, U.S.
- Education: Harvard University, Yale University
- Occupations: Composer; teacher; music critic
- Spouses: Barbara Foster (1899–1980) (m. 1920; div. 1936) Sarah Elizabeth Frank (m. 1936)
- Children: 2

Roger Huntington Sessions (December 28, 1896 – March 16, 1985) was an American composer, teacher, and writer on music. He had started his career writing in a neoclassical style, but gradually moved towards complex harmonies and postromanticism, and finally the twelve-tone serialism of the Second Viennese School. Sessions's friendship with Arnold Schoenberg influenced him, but he modified his technique to a unique style involving rows to supply melodic themes, while composing subsidiary parts freely.

== Life ==
Sessions was born in Brooklyn, New York, to a family that could trace its roots back to the American Revolution. His mother was Ruth Huntington Sessions. Roger studied music at Harvard University from the age of 14. There he wrote for and subsequently edited the Harvard Musical Review. Graduating at age 18, he went on to study at Yale University under Horatio Parker and Ernest Bloch before teaching at Smith College. With the exception, mostly, of his incidental music to the play The Black Maskers, composed in part in Cleveland in 1923, his first major compositions came while he was traveling Europe with his first wife in his mid-twenties and early thirties.

Returning to the United States in 1933, he taught first at Princeton University (from 1936), moved to the University of California, Berkeley, where he taught from 1945 to 1953, and then returned to Princeton until retiring in 1965. He was elected a Fellow of the American Academy of Arts and Sciences in 1961. He was appointed Bloch Professor at Berkeley (1966–67), and gave the Charles Eliot Norton Lectures at Harvard University in 1968–69. He continued to teach on a part-time basis at the Juilliard School from 1966 until 1983.

He was a friend of both Arnold Schoenberg and Thomas Mann.

In 1968 Sessions was awarded the Edward MacDowell Medal for outstanding contribution to the arts by the MacDowell Colony. Sessions won a special Pulitzer Prize in 1974 citing "his life's work as a distinguished American composer." In 1982 he won the annual Pulitzer Prize for Music for his Concerto for Orchestra, first performed by the Boston Symphony Orchestra on October 23, 1981.

Sessions married Barbara Foster in June 1920. They divorced in September 1936. He married Sarah Elizabeth Franck in November 1936. They had two children, John Porter Sessions (1938–2014) and Elizabeth Phelps Sessions (born 1940). John Sessions became a professional cellist. Roger Sessions died at the age of 88 in Princeton, New Jersey.

== Style ==
His works written up to 1930 or so are more or less neoclassical in style. Those written between 1930 and 1945 are more or less tonal but harmonically complex. The works from 1946 onwards are atonal and, beginning with the Solo Violin Sonata of 1953, serial although not consistently employing Viennese twelve-tone technique. Only the first movement and the trio of the scherzo of the Violin Sonata, for example, employ a twelve-tone row strictly, the rest employing a scalar-constructed dissonant style. Sessions's usual method was to use a row to control the full chromaticism and motivic-intervallic cohesion that already marks his music from before 1953. He treated his rows with great freedom, however, typically using pairs of unordered complementary hexachords to provide “harmonic” aspects without determining note-by-note melodic succession, or conversely using the row to supply melodic thematic material while freely composing the subsidiary parts.

== Major works ==
- 3 Chorale Preludes for Organ (1924–26)
- Symphony No. 1 (1927)
- The Black Maskers Orchestral Suite (1928)
- Piano Sonata No. 1 (1930)
- Violin Concerto (1935)
- String Quartet No. 1 (1936)
- From My Diary (Pages from a Diary), for piano (1940)
- Duo for Violin and Piano (1942)
- Piano Sonata No. 2 (1946)
- Symphony No. 2 (1946)
- The Trial of Lucullus (1947), one-act opera
- String Quartet No. 2 (1951)
- Sonata for Solo Violin (1953)
- Idyll of Theocritus (1954)
- Mass, for unison chorus and organ (1956)
- Piano Concerto (1956)
- Symphony No. 3 (1957)
- String Quintet (1957 or 1957–58)
- Symphony No. 4 (1958)
- Divertimento for orchestra (1959)
- Montezuma (ca. 1940–1962, 1940s–1962, orchestration finished 1963, 1935–63, or 1941–64), opera in three acts (libretto by Giuseppe Antonio Borgese)
- Symphony No. 5 (1964)
- Piano Sonata No. 3 (1965)
- Symphony No. 6 (1966)
- Six Pieces for Violoncello (1966)
- Symphony No. 7 (1967)
- Symphony No. 8 (1968)
- Rhapsody for Orchestra (1970)
- Concerto for Violin, Cello and Orchestra (1970–1971)
- When Lilacs Last in the Dooryard Bloom'd (1971)
- Three Choruses on Biblical Texts (1971)
- Concertino for Chamber Orchestra (1972)
- Five Pieces for Piano (1975)
- Symphony No. 9 (October 1978)
- Concerto for Orchestra (1981)
- Duo for Violin and Violoncello (1981), incomplete

Some works received their first professional performance many years after completion. The Sixth Symphony (1966) was given its first complete performance on March 4, 1977, by the Juilliard Orchestra in New York City.

The Ninth Symphony (1978), commissioned by the Syracuse Symphony Orchestra and Frederik Prausnitz, was premiered on January 17, 1980, by the same orchestra conducted by Christopher Keene.

== Writings ==
- Sessions, Roger. Harmonic Practice. New York: Harcourt, Brace. 1951. LCCN 51-8476.
- —. Reflections on the Music Life in the United States. New York: Merlin Press. 1956. LCCN 56-12976.
- —. The Musical Experience of Composer, Performer, Listener. Princeton, New Jersey: Princeton University Press. 1950, republished 1958.
- —. Questions About Music. Cambridge: Harvard University Press. 1970, reprinted New York: Norton, 1971. ISBN 0-674-74350-4.
- —. Roger Sessions on Music: Collected Essays, edited by Edward T. Cone. Princeton: Princeton University Press, 1979. ISBN 0-691-09126-9 (cloth) ISBN 0-691-10074-8 (pbk)

== Notable students ==
- List of music students by teacher: R to S#Roger Sessions
