= Syracuse Symphony Orchestra =

American symphony orchestra (1961–2011)

- Orchestra
- official Logo
- Founded: 1961
- Disbanded: 2011

The Syracuse Symphony Orchestra (SSO) was a 79-member orchestra located in Syracuse, New York. In its time it was the 43rd largest orchestra in the United States and performed a variety of programs including the Post-Standard Classics Series and M&T Bank Pops Series. The orchestra also operated two youth orchestras in the Syracuse area: the Syracuse Symphony Youth Orchestra and the Syracuse Symphony Youth String Orchestra.

== History ==
It was founded in 1961 as a community orchestra by a grant from the Gifford Foundation. Its first music director was Karl Kritz, assisted by Benson Snyder and Carolyn Hopkins. In its first season it performed four subscription concerts at Central High School's Lincoln Auditorium and eight young people's concerts plus one pops concert. By the end of its third season, permanent chamber groups had been formed - a string quartet, a woodwind quintet, a brass quintet and a percussion ensemble.

Assisted by a Ford Foundation Challenge Grant, their budget grew, and recordings were regularly being broadcast on WONO-FM. A new location was found for their regular concerts at Henninger High School, while regional concerts in Watertown, Rome and Cortland followed. In 1975, the orchestra moved into its last home, the Crouse Hinds Theater in the John H. Mulroy Civic Center Theaters at Oncenter.

In 2011, the Syracuse Symphony Orchestra filed Chapter 7 bankruptcy; a core group of forty musicians continued as self-managed Symphony Syracuse. On December 14, 2012, musician-owned and operated organization Musical Associates of Central New York announced their new orchestra in Syracuse, named Symphoria.

On February 17, 2024, Symphoria announced it was changing its name to The Syracuse Orchestra.

== List of Musical Directors ==
- Karl Kritz (1961–1969)
- Frederik Prausnitz (1971–1975)
- Christopher Keene (1975–1985)
- Kazuyoshi Akiyama (1985–1992)
- Fabio Mechetti (1992–1999)
- Daniel Hege (1999–2011)

== Programming ==
In addition to its main series of programs, the Post-Standard Classics Series, M&T Bank Pops Series, Central New York Community Foundation Family Series, and the Stained Glass Series, the Syracuse Symphony Orchestra took part in local educational youth programs, and free summer parks concerts. It also played for Syracuse Opera performances.

Performances were broadcast twice weekly on WCNY-FM.

== Awards ==
In 1999 the orchestra was presented with the Governor's Arts Award in recognition of its activities within the region.

== Finances ==
The orchestra was a non-profit organization which was supported in part through its volunteer organization, the Syracuse Symphony Association and a 60-member board of directors. Twice in its history the orchestra had been forced to cut short its season due to budgetary issues. The first time was in the spring of 1992 and the second in the spring of 2011. In both cases the orchestra could not raise enough funds to cover its operating budget for the year.

In early April 2011, the orchestra announced plans to file for bankruptcy under Chapter 7, a chapter of the U.S. bankruptcy code that indicates that the organization planned to liquidate itself and go out of operation. Unfunded pension obligations were blamed.
