= Kathryn Olesko =

American historian of science

Kathryn Mary Olesko (born 1951) is an American historian of science. She is an associate professor at Georgetown University, where she is affiliated with the Science, Technology and International Affairs program in the School of Foreign Service, the Department of History, and the Department of German. Her research interests include the history of science in Germany and the history of science teaching.

== Education and career ==
Olesko graduated from Cornell University in 1973, and returned to Cornell for a Ph.D. in history in 1980. She became an assistant professor at Clarkson University in 1980, and moved to Georgetown University in 1981.

She was editor-in-chief of the history of science journal Osiris from 2002 to 2008.

== Books ==
Olesko is the author of the book Physics as a Calling: Discipline and Practice in the Königsberg Seminar for Physics (Cornell University Press, 1991).

Her edited volumes include Science in Germany: The Interaction of Institutional and Intellectual Issues (1990).

== Recognition ==
Olesko was named a Fellow of the American Association for the Advancement of Science (AAAS) in 1998, "for contributions to scholarship and teaching in the history of science and for leadership in AAAS and the History of Science Society". She chaired the AAAS Section on the History and Philosophy of Science for the 1996–1997 term.

She was named a Fellow of the American Physical Society (APS) in 2016, after a nomination by the APS Forum on the History of Physics, "for foundational contributions to the history of physics pedagogy and prolific editorial work in service of the history of science".
