= Frederik Prausnitz =

German-American conductor and teacher

Frederik William Prausnitz (August 26, 1920 in Cologne – November 12, 2004 in Lewes, Delaware) was a German-born American conductor and teacher. His grandfather, Wilhelm Prausnitz, was the dean of the medical school at Graz, as well as a Privy Counsellor. His family, of Lutheran background, emigrated from Cologne to Philadelphia, Pennsylvania in 1937 because of deep disagreements with the Nazi regime. Upon graduation from the Juilliard School he won a conducting competition sponsored by the Detroit Symphony Orchestra in 1943, taught at Juilliard for some twenty years in the 1950s and 1960s, took over as conductor of the New England Conservatory Orchestra in Boston, Massachusetts, and eventually moved to London where he was a staff conductor with the BBC Symphony Orchestra. After his return to the US he was the music director of the Syracuse Symphony for three years, then joined the faculty of the Peabody Conservatory in Baltimore, Maryland where he remained until his retirement in 1998. Noted especially for his commitment to contemporary music, he was also a devoted exponent of the music of Gustav Mahler. He wrote a biography of Roger Sessions and a conducting textbook, Score and Podium. He adopted the unusual form of his first name after seeing an Italian concert poster with that misspelling.
