= Andrea Olmstead =

American musicologist, historian

Andrea Olmstead (born September 5, 1948) is an American musicologist and historian.

Reared in Grand Forks, North Dakota, Olmstead studied violin with Burton Kaplan in New York and with Lea Foli at the Aspen Music Festival; she was a member of the New York Youth Symphony and the National Orchestral Association. She then embarked upon the study of musicology; her instructors included Gustave Reese, George Perle, H. Wiley Hitchcock, Barry S. Brook, James Haar, Brian Fennelly, and Jan LaRue. Her teaching career took her to The Juilliard School, from 1972 until 1980; the Aspen Music School, from 1973 to 1976; the Boston Conservatory, from 1981 to 2004; the New England Conservatory, from 2006 to 2018; and the University of Massachusetts, Amherst, from 2009 until 2010. The author of numerous books, she has also produced articles in Journal of Musicology, Perspectives of New Music, The Journal of the Arnold Schoenberg Institute, Tempo, Musical America, and The Musical Quarterly, reviews, program notes, and liner notes; she has also given pre-concert lectures and produced CDs. From 2005 until 2007 she was the Christopher Hogwood Research Fellow of the Handel and Haydn Society Orchestra and Chorus. Olmstead is especially well-regarded for her work on the music of Roger Sessions and for her history of The Juilliard School. Vincent Persichetti; Grazioso, Grit, and Gold, was awarded the 2019 ASCAP-Deems Taylor Award for Outstanding Musical Biography. Other honors have included three awards from the National Endowment for the Humanities, and she has spent time as a visiting scholar at the American Academy in Rome and as a fellow of the Virginia Center for the Creative Arts. Olmstead is married to composer Larry Thomas Bell, for whom she adapted the play Holy Ghosts by Romulus Linney into an opera libretto; in 2009 she produced its premiere in Boston.

Olmstead's papers are held by the New York Public Library, to which she donated them in 2013.

== Publications ==
- Roger Sessions and His Music (UMI Research Press, 1985).
- Conversations with Roger Sessions (Northeastern University Press, 1987).
- The Correspondence of Roger Sessions (Northeastern, 1992).
- Juilliard: A History (University of Illinois Press, 1999).
- Roger Sessions: A Biography (Routledge, 2007).
- Who Was F. Scott Fitzgerald's Daisy? (ebook, 2012).
- Vincent Persichetti: Grazioso, Grit, and Gold (Rowman & Littlefield, 2018).
