= Frank A. Rooke =

American architect (1862–1946)

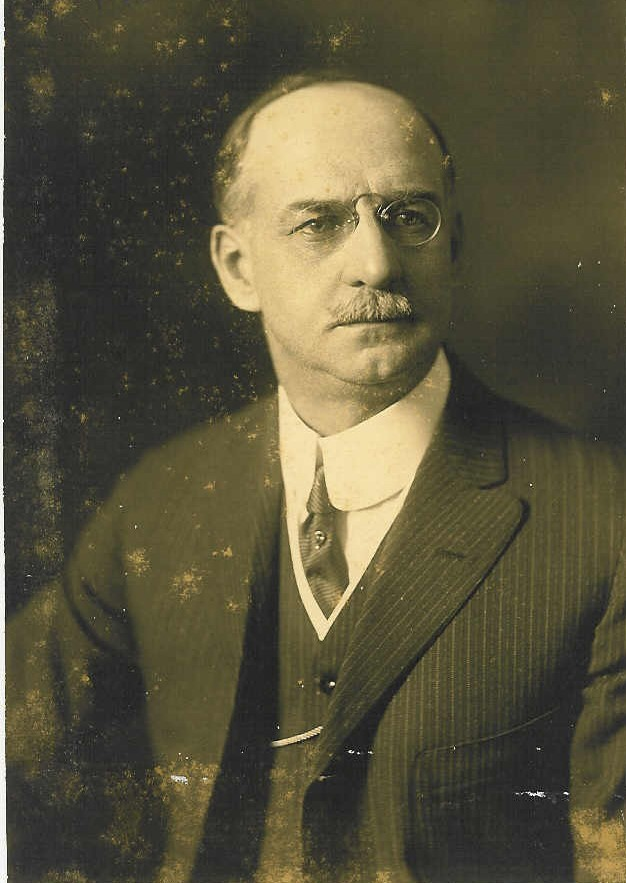
- Frank A. Rooke
- Born: 1862; Rye, New York
- Died: 1946
- Occupation: Architect
- Known for: Designed historic Claremont Stables, 175 West 89th Street, New York, NY
- Spouse: Gertrude Walker Rooke
- Children: Walker Rooke

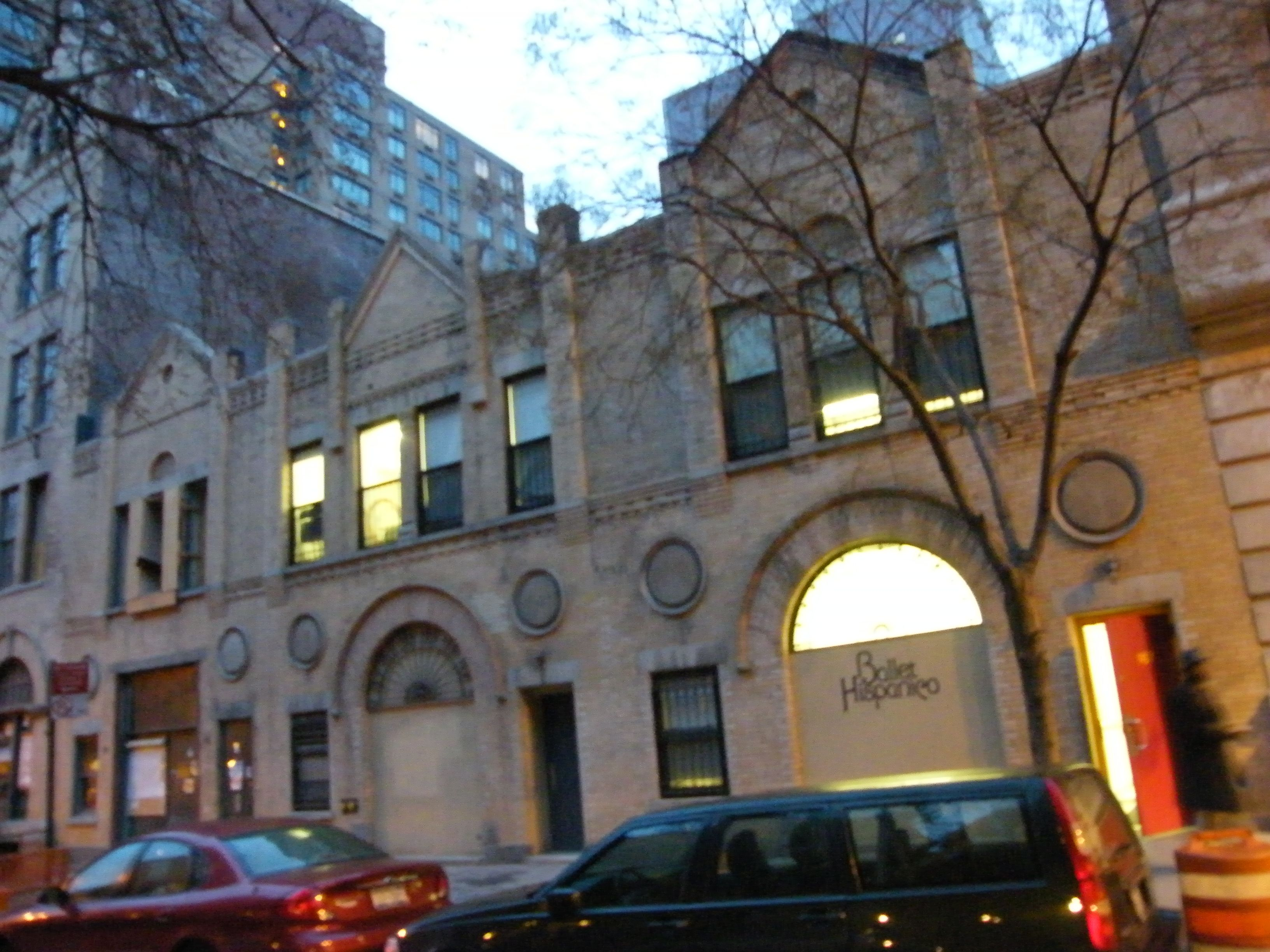
Former stables on West 89th Street

Frank Aydelott Rooke (1862–1946), known professionally as Frank A. Rooke, was a New York architect who designed the historic Claremont Riding Academy and numerous other structures of significance that are either in National Historic Districts or listed on the National Register of Historic Places in the tri-state area.

== Early life ==
Rooke was born in 1862 in Rye, New York.

He opened an office at 1262 Broadway in Manhattan in 1887. That year he designed a building combining a store, a stable, and apartments for Loton Horton of the Horton Ice Cream Co., at 371 Amsterdam Avenue, in the Upper West Side–Central Park West Historic District (designated by the New York City Landmarks Preservation Commission).

== Higgs & Rooke ==
Rooke formed a brief but productive partnership with architect Paul Franklyn Higgs in 1888. Over the next 2 years, they designed several buildings together which today are in recognized national historic districts. in 1889–90, they planned a Flemish/Romanesque Revival style apartment building at 373–375 Amsterdam Avenue, for Rooke's patron Horton.

The two architects designed a row of seven houses built in 1889 at 669–681 10th Street in what is now the Park Slope Historic District in Brooklyn.

In 1890, they created a pair of houses on West 92nd Street and a single house on West 77th Street in Manhattan.

That same year they drafted plans for 5 row houses on West 147th Street in the Hamilton Heights/Sugar Hill Historic District for one client named Dennis J. Dwyer. Dwyer lived in one of the buildings at 430 West 147th Street, after it was finished; his house was created in the Renaissance Revival style while the other 4 - numbers 422, 424, 426 and 428 - were Romanesque Revival with arched windows on the second floors.

== Claremont Stables ==
In 1892, Rooke returned to private practice and designed the Claremont Stables as well as adjacent private stables at 167, 169, and 171 West 89th Street.

== Sheffield Farms ==
Rooke was long associated with the Sheffield Farms dairy company, for which he designed four pioneering pasteurization and bottling plants. He also designed stables and carriage houses.

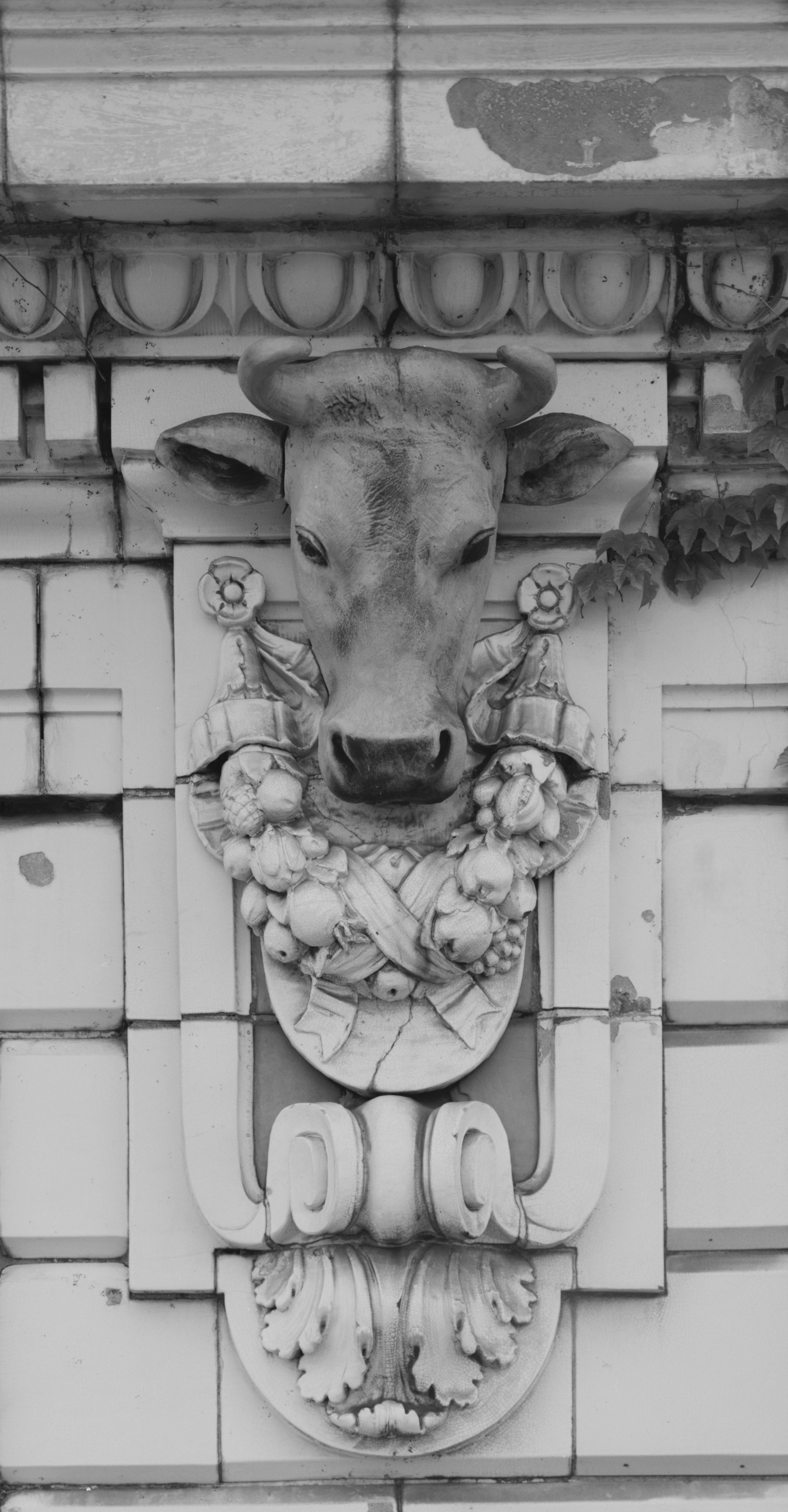
Bronx plant

Rooke advanced the design of large-scale milk plants, for the Sheffield Farms–Slawson–Decker Company (aka Sheffield Farms). The company had been established in 1902 with Horton as its president and was at the forefront of the dairy business in the early 20th century. In 1903, Rooke designed a stable and milk depot for the company, at the southwest corner of Broadway and 130th Street in Manhattan. It was listed on the National Register of Historic Places in 2005 but later demolished.

In 1907, Sheffield Farms erected its first pasteurization and bottling plant, at 524–528 West 57th Street, to Rooke's design. It was the first large-scale pasteurization plant, with the first continuous holding system of pasteurization, in the country. In 1909 Rooke designed a four-story addition to the 1903 stable, giving it an electric freight elevator and a new facade topped with a Mansard roof.

Purity of milk became of increasing importance to the public and that impacted the design of Sheffield's plants. In 1910, Horton explained that increased costs of his bottled product were tied to ensuring sterile conditions and the following year he asked Rooke to design a second plant for him. At 632 West 125th Street, the former plant stands today as Columbia University's Prentis Hall, home of the Computer Music Center. It features a glazed white terracotta façade, and the interior retains the original Guastavino tile vaulted ceiling.

Rooke designed a third Sheffield Farms Milk Plant, which opened in 1914 at 1075 Webster Avenue at 166th Street in the Bronx (now demolished). It was one of the most expensive and elaborate milk plants, with one of the largest processing capacities, in the country. The following year a company publication described Rooke as the "Company Architect". In 1917 Sheffield Farms completed another plant designed by Rooke, at 1368 Fulton Street in Brooklyn, at Marcy Avenue, in the Bedford–Stuyvesant section; it was advertised as the largest in New York. Like the Bronx plant, it has a glazed terracotta facade ornamented with reliefs of milk bottles and cow heads. Sheffield closed this plant in the early 1960s, a time of civil unrest there with gang wars and riots, and the plant remained empty several years before a new non-profit, the Bedford Stuyvesant Restoration Corporation, turned the plant into the Billie Holiday Theatre, which opened in 1972.

== Other work ==
Although the majority of his designs were for New York City clients, Rooke did some residential work in Westchester and New Jersey.

Rooke's last known commissions were an alteration to a four-story commercial building at 130 West 45th Street in 1934, and a 1934–36 alteration of the one-story 433 W. 127th Street to three stories for the Horton Pilsner Company. Sheffield Farms replaced Rooke's 57th Street plant in 1937 with a massive new milk plant designed by a different architectural firm.

== Legacy and National Register sites ==
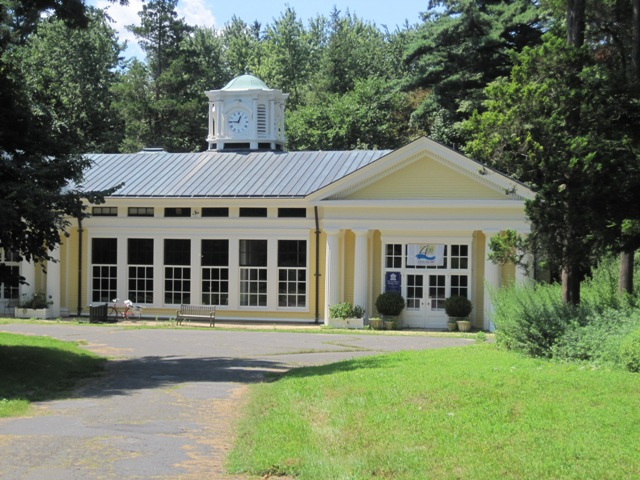
Van Norden Carriage House in Rye, New York

Several of Rooke's designs still exist in New York City and Westchester County and have been designated landmarks:

In 1906, Rooke incorporated dairy-plant features, like enameled brick walls, into plans for two structures at a private residence in Rye, New York; he designed a Classical revival carriage house as well as a unique Zebra Barn for financier Warner M. Van Norden. Both buildings are extant, were listed on the National Register of Historic Places and are undergoing restoration at the Jay Heritage Center.

In 1912, Rooke designed an alteration to the Mount Morris Bank Building in Harlem. The building fell into neglect yet was listed on the National Register of Historic sites in 1989. Today that building is undergoing rehabilitation and revitalization as mixed use space.

== Personal life ==
Rooke was married to Gertrude Walker of Metuchen, New Jersey. By 1926, the couple had had one son, Walker and were living in Port Chester, New York. Gertrude died unexpectedly of a heart attack at the age of 40.

Rooke died in 1946.
