= Tzvi Avni =

Israeli composer (born 1927)

- צבי אבני
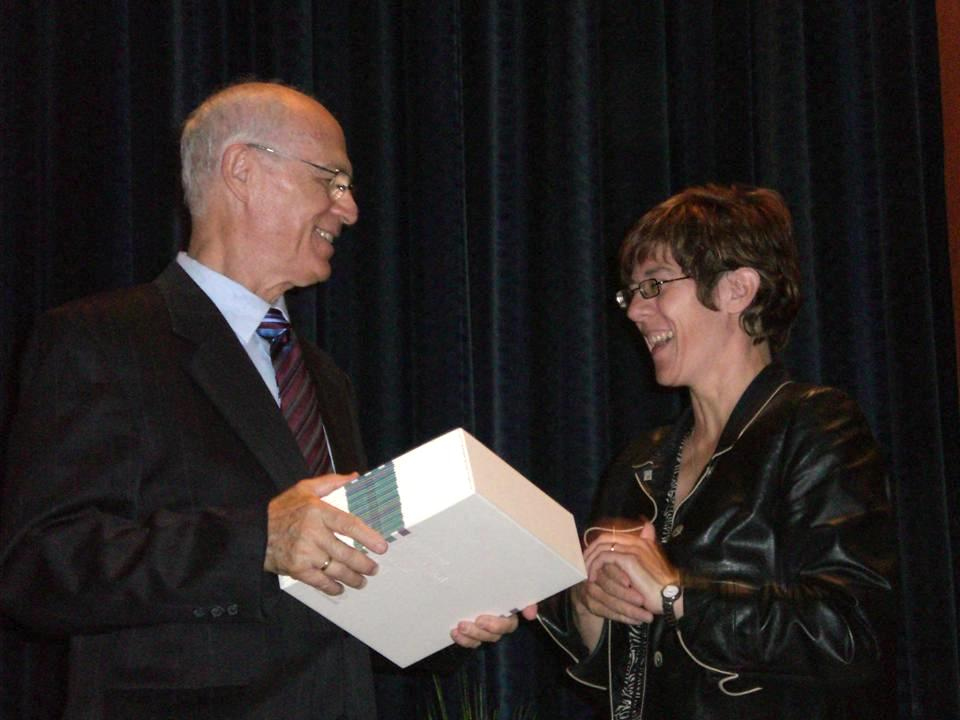
- Tzvi Avni and Annegret Kramp-Karrenbauer
- Born: Hermann Jakob Steinke; 2 September 1927 (age 98); Saarbrücken, Territory of the Saar Basin
- Education: Jerusalem Academy of Music and Dance
- Occupation: Composer
- Awards: Israel Prize (2001)

Tzvi Jacob Avni (first name sometimes spelled Zvi; Hebrew: צבי אבני; born Hermann Jakob Steinke, September 2, 1927; Saarbrücken) is an Israeli composer.

== Biography ==
Tzvi Avni was born in Saarbrücken, (now Germany), and emigrated to Mandate Palestine as a child. He studied with Paul Ben-Haim.

On the recommendation of Edgard Varèse, he became involved with the Columbia-Princeton Electronic Music Center in the 1960s. Later he founded an electronic studio at the Jerusalem Academy of Music, following the guidelines of his mentor in New York, Vladimir Ussachevsky.

== Awards ==
In 2001, Avni was awarded the Israel Prize, for music. On September 11, 2012, Avni was made an honorary citizen of Saarbrücken.

== See also ==
- List of Israel Prize recipients
