= Pril Smiley =

American classical composer

Pril Smiley (born 19 March 1943) is an American composer and pioneer of electronic music.

== Biography ==
Pril Smiley was born in Mohonk Lake, New York. She worked at the Columbia-Princeton Electronic Music Center in the 1960s and 1970s with Milton Babbitt, Otto Luening, Vladimir Ussachevsky, Mario Davidovsky and Alice Shields. She became one of four primary instructors in electronic music at the center and also served as director. From 1968 to 1974 she worked as a consultant to the Lincoln Center Repertory Theater in New York City and was awarded a Guggenheim Fellowship in 1975. She ended her career as a composer in the mid-1980s, but continued to teach, and retired from Columbia in 1995. Her works have been performed internationally.

== Works ==
Smiley composed over forty works for film, theater and dance. Selected works include:

- Eclipse (1967)
- Kolyosa (1970)
- Forty-Three (1984)

=== Discography ===
- Pioneers of Electronic Music (2006) by New World Records
- Columbia - Princeton Electronic Music Center: Original Four-Channel Versions of Electronic Compositions By Bulent Arel, Milton Babbitt, Mario Davidovsky, Alice Shields, Pril Smiley, Vladimir Ussachevsky (Quadraphonic vinyl LP) (1969) by Finnadar Records
- Columbia-Princeton Electronic Music Center Tenth Anniversary Album - Vinyl by Milton Babbitt, Edgard Varese, Otto Luening, Pril Smiley, et al. by CRI
- Electronic Music Pioneers (1994) - Audio CD by Bulent Arel, Mario Davidovsky, Otto Luening, Alice Shields, et al. by CRI / Composers Recordings
- Columbia-Princeton Electronic Music Center 10th Anniversary (2010) - Audio CD - Original recording reissued by Edgard Varèse, Milton Babbitt, Vladimir Ussachevsky, Otto Luening, Pril Smiley, et al.

=== Filmography ===
- 1994 Theremin: An Electronic Odyssey (documentary) thereminist
- 1976 The Premonition, composer: electronic music
- 1968 Two Girls for a Madman, music effects
