= Claremont Riding Academy =

- Claremont Stables
- U.S. National Register of Historic Places
- New York State Register of Historic Places
- New York City Landmark
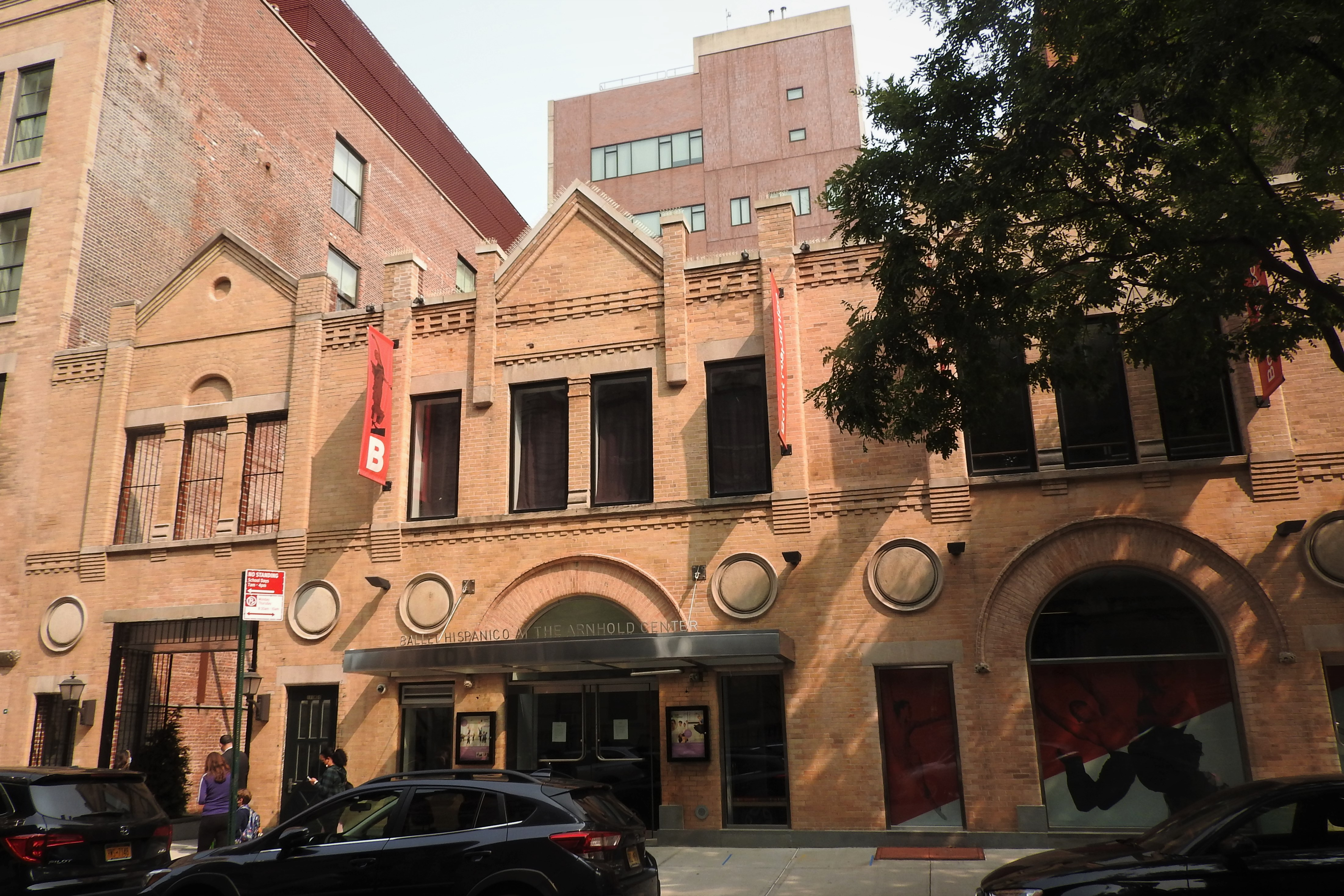
- Claremont Riding Academy, April 2008

- Location within New York City Location within New York Location within the United States
- Location: 173–177 W. 89th St., New York, New York
- Coordinates: 40°47′23″N 73°58′23″W
- Area: 0.2 acres (0.081 ha)
- Built: 1892
- Architect: Rooke, Frank A.
- Architectural style: Romanesque, Flemish
- NRHP reference No.: 80002683
- NYSRHP No.: 06101.000636, 06101.004543, 06101.004541
- NYCL No.: 1658

Significant dates
- Added to NRHP: April 16, 1980
- Designated NYSRHP: June 23, 1980
- Designated NYCL: August 14, 1990

The Claremont Riding Academy, originally Claremont Stables, 175 West 89th Street, between Columbus and Amsterdam Avenues on Manhattan's Upper West Side, was designed by Frank A. Rooke and built in 1892. Closed in 2007, Claremont was the oldest continuously operated equestrian stable in New York City and the last public stable in Manhattan. The building was listed on the National Register of Historic Places in 1980 and designated a New York City Landmark in 1990. Since 2010, it has belonged to the Stephen Gaynor School.

== Claremont Stables ==
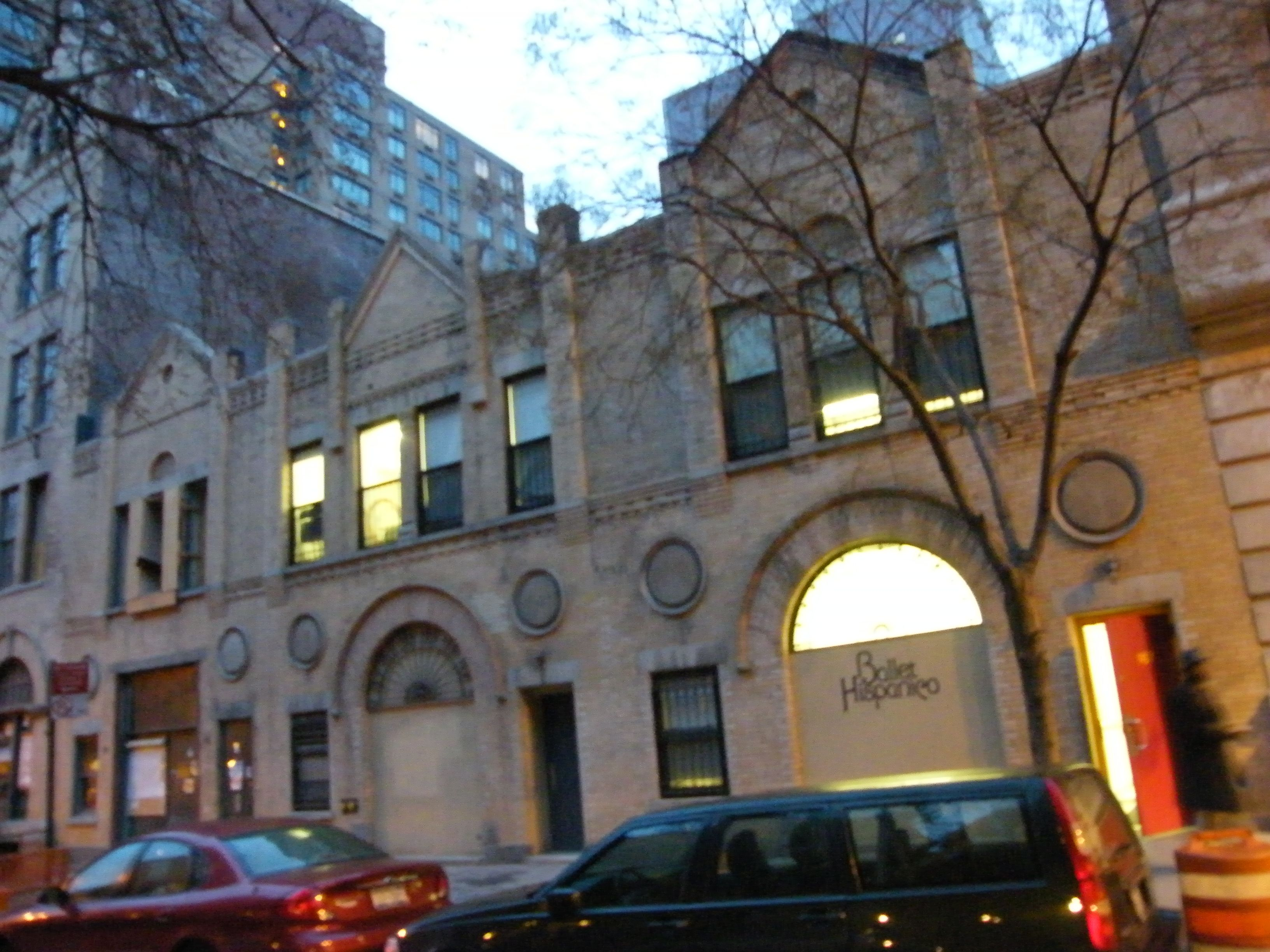
Former private stables adjoining Claremont on its east

In 1892, when horses still provided the primary means of transportation – the first automobile appeared on Manhattan's streets six years later – developer Edward W. Bedell, architect Frank A. Rooke, and builder Richard Deeves created a four-story carriage stable with a full basement. A penthouse was added in 1901. The structure had stalls for horses on the basement and second floors, and carriage storage space on the third, fourth, and penthouse floors; the main floor was used for carriage storage and for hitching the horses to their burdens. Horses and carriages could be had for hire, and horses could be boarded.

At the same time, Rooke designed three two-story architecturally compatible private stables which were built on the neighboring lots – now 167, 169, and 171 West 89th Street – which Bedell then sold to local families. These were listed on the National Register of Historic Places in 1983. They were rehabilitated in 1989 by Buck & Cane to serve as the home of Ballet Hispanico.

The style is Romanesque Revival. Prevalent in the 1880s and found throughout the Upper West Side, the style was adapted for a number of different building types, both residential and commercial. The facade is beige Roman brick, limestone, and terra cotta.

The building is supported by the two outside brick walls, plus column and girders. The ground floor and basement columns are cast iron. The stable floors were of scored concrete or cement, with drains for liquid waste disposal. The basement and first and second floors were connected by ramps.

Bedell sold the building in 1893, and over the next thirty-four years a number of different concerns operated the stable as lessees.

== Claremont Riding Academy ==

In 1927 the Claremont Stables became a riding school, in part to encourage the employment of the bridle paths in nearby Central Park. In December 1943, Irwin J. Novograd, a Polish immigrant employed as a bookkeeper for Claremont, purchased the building.

In 1961 the building was condemned by the City of New York for demolition as part of the West Side Urban Renewal Area. The academy remained as month-to-month tenant for 37 years, with Irwin's son, Paul J. Novograd, becoming the academy's president in 1984, and continuing to offer boarding privileges, group and private riding lessons, and horse rentals. The city changed its plans, the demolition never occurred, and the academy was able to repurchase the building from the city in 1998.

The Central Park bridle paths, however, had been allowed to deteriorate, and were no longer restricted to equestrian use, which became practically impossible, resulting in a loss of business to the academy. This, and the expenses resulting from a historic restoration, the owners said, led to the academy's demise in 2007. Claremont was the oldest stable structure in New York still in use at the time.

In 2010, the building was purchased by the Stephen Gaynor School – whose main building, at 148 West 90th Street, is behind it – which adapted it for the school's arts center and early learning center, building a rooftop addition in 2012. (Note: The 1901 penthouse was demolished by 1990. See Marthey:9n23. The two gabled structures with windows, above the fourth floor, are small, shallow attics.)

== In popular culture ==
The 1981 film Eyewitness features an extended sequence shot on location in the riding academy.
