= Prentis Hall =

Historic building at Columbia University

Coordinates: 40.8165°N 73.9595°W

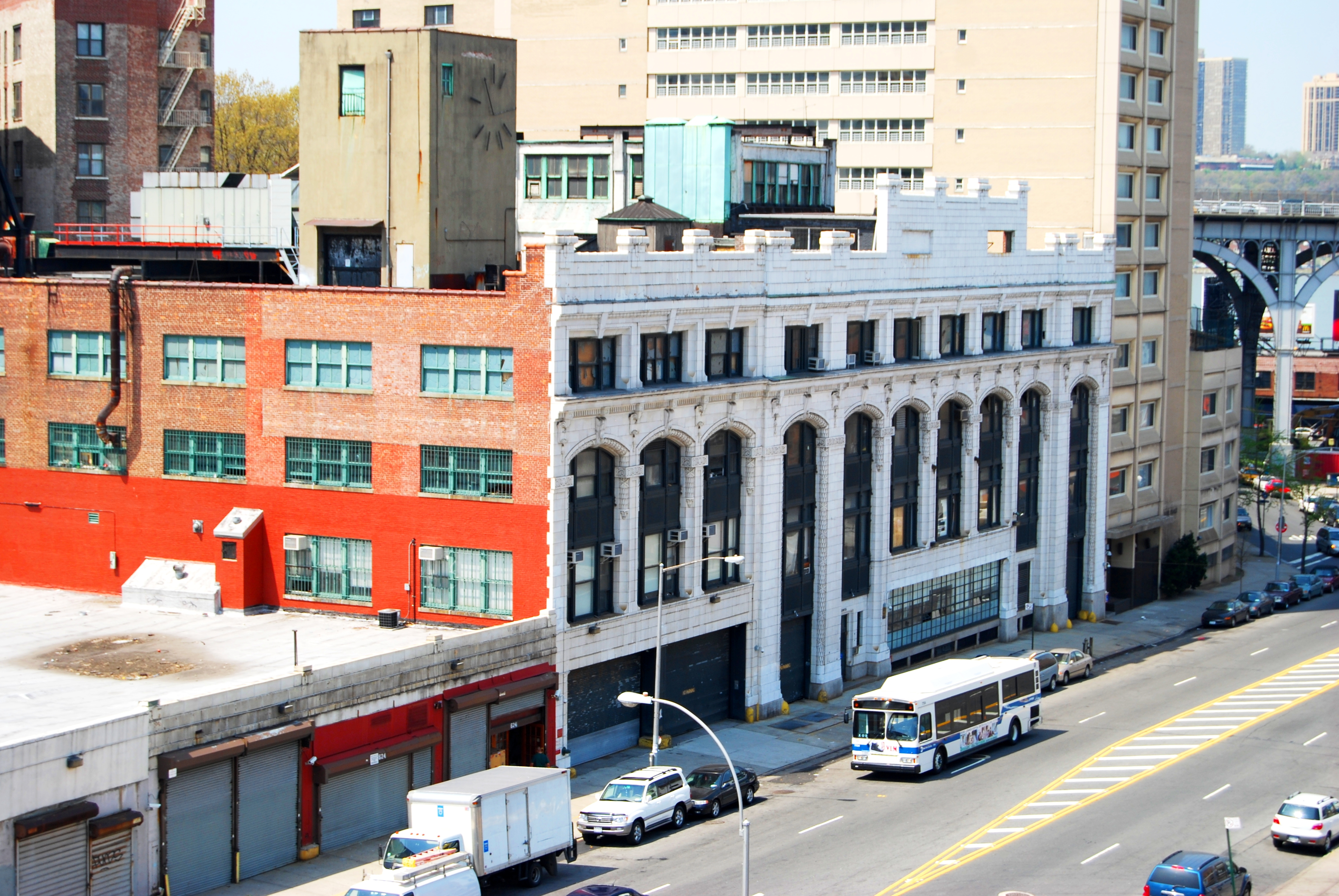
Prentis Hall in 2008

Prentis Hall is a historic building located on the Manhattanville campus of Columbia University at 632 West 125th Street. It houses the university's department of music and the Computer Music Center, as well as facilities for the School of the Arts. It is one of three historic buildings that survived in the university's Manhattanville plan, the others being the Studebaker Building and the Nash Building.

== History ==
Prentis Hall was built from 1909 to 1911 as a pasteurization and bottling plant for the Sheffield Farms–Slawson–Decker Company. Designed by Frank A. Rooke, who designed several other buildings for Sheffield Farms, the building cost $500,000 to construct and could process 75,000 quarts of milk per day. The building is noted for its façade of white glazed terracotta, which is ornately designed in a French style. Its walls are brick with steel frame covered with concrete. The entire building was built to be vermin-proof and fire-proof. Its bottling room had a 27-foot ceiling with a skylight and large dome.

It was acquired by Columbia in 1949 as part of a $12,000,000 expansion plan for its School of Engineering and Applied Science, and since the 1950s has hosted the university's Computer Music Center. During the Manhattan Project, Prentis Hall housed the Heat Transfer Research Facility, which performed many critical heat flux tests in order to determine the temperature a nuclear reactor would melt down. The building was investigated, along with Pupin Hall, in either 1967 or 1977 by the Energy Research and Development Administration for possible radiation contamination.

Prentis Hall houses the RCA Mark II Sound Synthesizer, the first programmable music synthesizer, which takes up an entire office wall. It was moved from RCA by to the university by Otto Luening and Vladimir Ussachevsky, who helped design the instrument, and pioneers of electronic music.
