= Ezaki =

Ezaki may refer to:

- 9756 Ezaki, a main-belt asteroid, named after Yusuke Ezaki (born 1957)
- Eiji Ezaki (1968–2016), name of Japanese wrestler Hayabusa
- Ezaki Glico, a Japanese food company
- Ezzaki Badou (a.k.a. Ezaki Badou; Zaki; born 1959), a Moroccan football player and club manager
- Kenjiro Ezaki (born 1926), a Japanese composer
- Kohei Ezaki (1904–1963), a Japanese Nihonga painter
- Toshiko Ezaki, a Japanese musician
