= Dorkbot =

dorkbot
- A dorkbot logo
- Formation: 2000
- Founder: Douglas Repetto
- Purpose: Electronic art and technology
- Region served: Worldwide
- Website: dorkbot.org

Dorkbot is the name used by an international network of local groups that hold informal meetings about electronic art, technology, and experimental projects. Participants have included artists, engineers, designers, scientists, programmers, students, and hobbyists. Its motto is "people doing strange things with electricity".

== History ==
Dorkbot was founded by artist and engineer Douglas Repetto at Columbia University's Computer Music Center in New York City in 2000. Repetto, who had recently moved to New York, described the original idea as an "adult show-and-tell" for people making unusual things with technology. The first meeting took place on December 6, 2000, in a classroom at the Computer Music Center and drew an audience of about ten people.

The name dorkbot combines "dork" and "robot". According to Repetto, the word had been coined by a friend; he adopted it in part because it did not define the meetings specifically as either art or engineering.

Dorkbot soon spread beyond New York. Repetto later recalled that organizers in London contacted him during the first year and held the first dorkbot-london meeting in November 2001; groups in Ghent and San Francisco followed. In 2004, The New Yorker reported dorkbot meetings in New York and fourteen other cities. A January 2006 report in The New York Times put the number of cities at nearly 30, while The Washington Post reported more than 50 chapters by the end of that year. By 2011, The Guardian described Dorkbot as having spread to more than 100 cities worldwide.

As attendance in New York grew, meetings moved between larger venues. From 2004, many were held at the nonprofit art space Location One in SoHo. Attendance there could reach about 150 people, although meetings were often much smaller. Repetto ended dorkbot-nyc after a thirteen-year run; other local dorkbots continued independently.

== Meetings and organization ==
Dorkbot meetings were intended as informal forums for work involving art and technology. The stated aims of dorkbot-nyc included providing informal peer review, presenting new art, technology, software, and hardware, and encouraging collaboration among people from different backgrounds. Meetings were free and open to the public.

The New York meetings generally featured three presentations of about 20 to 30 minutes each. Presenters were encouraged to discuss current work informally rather than give conventional lectures or retrospective artist talks, and questions from the audience could be asked during the presentation. Projects covered a wide range of subjects, including electronic and sound art, robotics, software, modified consumer electronics, and experimental interfaces.

There was no single meeting format for the international network. The Washington Post noted in 2006 that each local group devised its own format. Repetto later described the organization as deliberately loose: organizers received a basic outline for short, informal presentations, but there were no membership dues or contracts, and local groups were free to adapt the idea to their own communities. Dorkbot itself was not incorporated as a central organization, and local organizers could use the name independently.

== See also ==
- ArtBots
- Café Scientifique
- Hackerspace
- Maker Faire
- Nerd Nite
