= Computer Music Center =

Columbia University electronic music research facility established in 1959

The Computer Music Center (CMC) at Columbia University is the oldest center for electronic and computer music research in the United States. Electronic music work began at Columbia University and Barnard College in 1951 as the Columbia Experimental Music Studio. In 1958, the name was changed to the Columbia-Princeton Electronic Music Center. In 1996, under the directorship of Brad Garton, the center's name was changed to the Columbia University Computer Music Center.

== Location ==
The Computer Music Center is housed in Prentis Hall, 632 West 125th Street, New York City, across the street from Columbia's 17-acre Manhattanville campus. The 5,400-square-foot facility consists of studios for teaching, electronic music, recording, spatial audio, a workshop for analog electronics and digital fabrication, and numerous composition and art studios for graduate student use. Projects to come out of the CMC since the 1990s include the following:

- ArtBots
- dorkbot
- PeRColate
- Real-Time Cmix

The director of the CMC is Seth Cluett, and the CMC offers classes taught by George E. Lewis, Seth Cluett, David Soldier, Anna Meadors, and Mark Santolucito, as well as visiting faculty who give seminars every year. Through the Department of Music, the center supports the work of DMA students in Music Composition, undergraduate music majors and minors, and collaborative research with departments across the university. In collaboration with the Visual Arts Program in the Columbia University School of the Arts, the Computer Music Center offers a sound art MFA program directed by Miya Masaoka, which was founded in 2014 by Douglas Repetto, who served as Director until 2016.

== History ==
The forerunner of the Columbia-Princeton Electronic Music Center was a studio founded in the early 1950s by Columbia University professors Vladimir Ussachevsky and Otto Luening, and Princeton University professors Milton Babbitt and Roger Sessions. Originally concerned with experiments in music composition involving the new technology of reel-to-reel tape, the studio soon branched out into all areas of electronic music research. The center was officially established with a grant from the Rockefeller Foundation in 1959 which was used to finance the installation of the RCA Mark II Sound Synthesizer donated by RCA, where it was invented by Herbert Belar in the laboratory of Harry F. Olson.

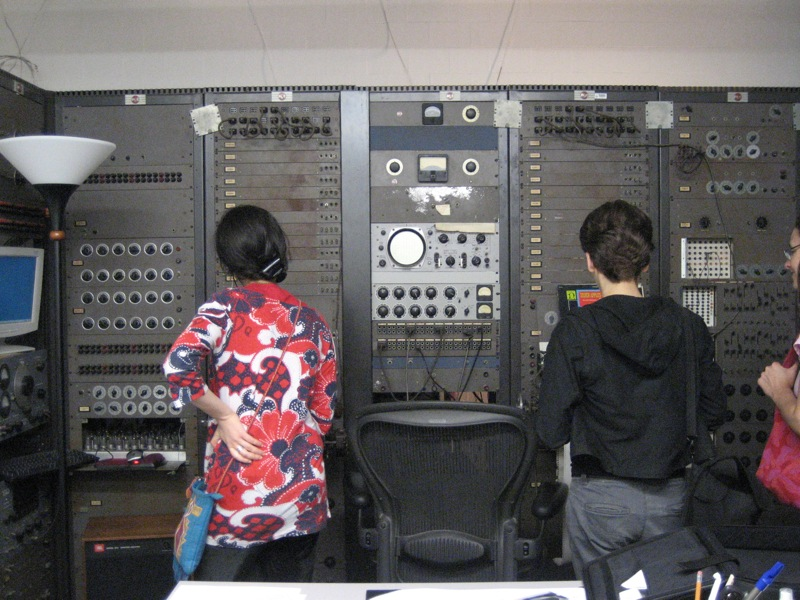
RCA Mark II Sound Synthesizer, Computer Music Center at Columbia University

The center's flagship piece of equipment, the RCA Mark II Sound Synthesizer, was delivered in 1957 after it was developed to Ussachevsky and Babbitt's specifications. The RCA (and the center) were re-housed in Prentis Hall, a building off the main Columbia campus on 125th Street. Significant pieces of electronic music realized on the Synthesizer included Babbitt's Vision and Prayer and Charles Wuorinen's Time's Encomium, which was awarded the 1970 Pulitzer Prize in Music. In 1964 Columbia Records released an album titled simply Columbia-Princeton Electronic Music Center, which was produced principally on the RCA synthesizer.

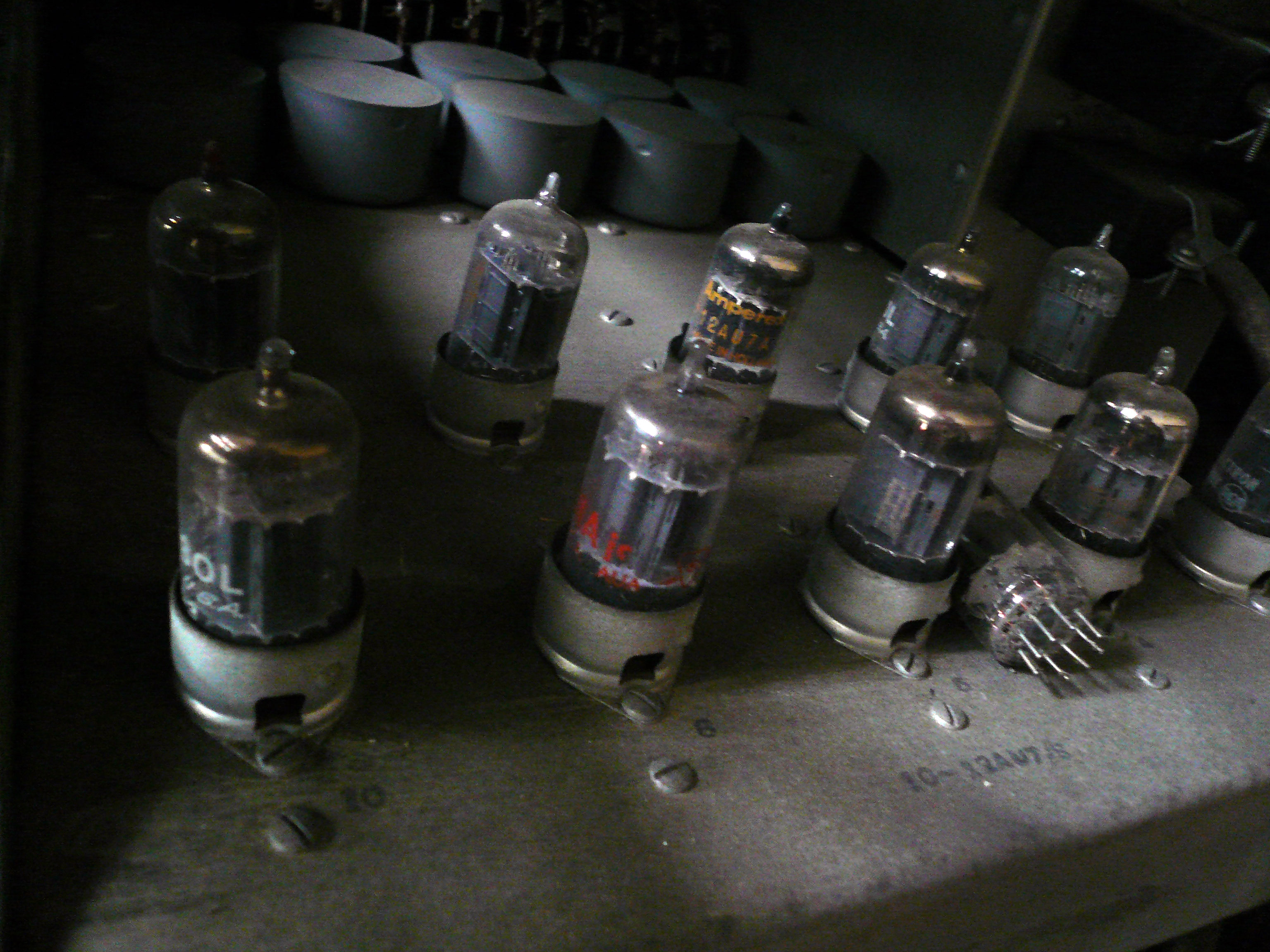
The "Victor" (nickname of RCA Mark II Sound Synthesizer) at the CMC was one of the first synthesizers. Exponents thought it would replace the orchestra, but it turned out to be difficult to keep consistent. Instead it was given to Columbia which used it to teach avant-garde electronic musicians.

Most of the luminaries in the field of electronic music (and avant-garde music in general) visited, worked, or studied at the Electronic Music Center, including Edgard Varèse, Chou Wen-chung, Halim El-Dabh, Michiko Toyama, Bülent Arel, Mario Davidovsky, Charles Dodge, Pril Smiley, Alice Shields, Wendy Carlos, Dariush Dolat-Shahi, Kenjiro Ezaki and Luciano Berio. The center also acted as a consulting agency for other electronic music studios in the Western Hemisphere, giving them advice on optimum studio design and helping them purchase equipment.

The staff engineers at the center under Peter Mauzey developed customized equipment to solve the needs of the composers working at the center. These include early prototypes of tape delay machines, custom mixing consoles, and analog triggers designed to facilitate interoperability between other (often custom-made) synthesizer equipment. The center also has a large collection of Buchla, Moog, and Serge Modular synthesizers.

By the late 1970s the Electronic Music Center was rapidly nearing obsolescence as its classical analog tape techniques were being surpassed by parallel work in the field of computer music. By the mid-1980s the Columbia and Princeton facilities had ceased their formal affiliation, with the Princeton music department strengthening its affiliation with Bell Labs and founding a computer music studio under Godfrey Winham and Paul Lansky (see Princeton Sound Lab).

The original Columbia facility was re-organized in 1996 under the leadership of Brad Garton and was renamed the Columbia University Computer Music Center. Garton served as Director from 1995 until 2021, when Seth Cluett became Director joined by Anna Meadors as Assistant Director.

== Associates ==
- Seth Cluett, Director, Lecturer in Computer Music and Sound Studies
- Anna Meadors, Assistant Director
- Brad Garton, Director Emeritus, Professor of Music
- Miya Masaoka, Director of the Sound Arts MFA Program
- Fred Lerdahl, Professor of Music
- Chou Wen-chung, Professor of Music
- George E. Lewis, Professor of Music
- Zosha Di Castri, Assistant Professor of Music
