= Studebaker Building (Columbia University) =

Former industrial building in New York, USA

Coordinates: 40°49′06.9″N 73°57′27.4″W

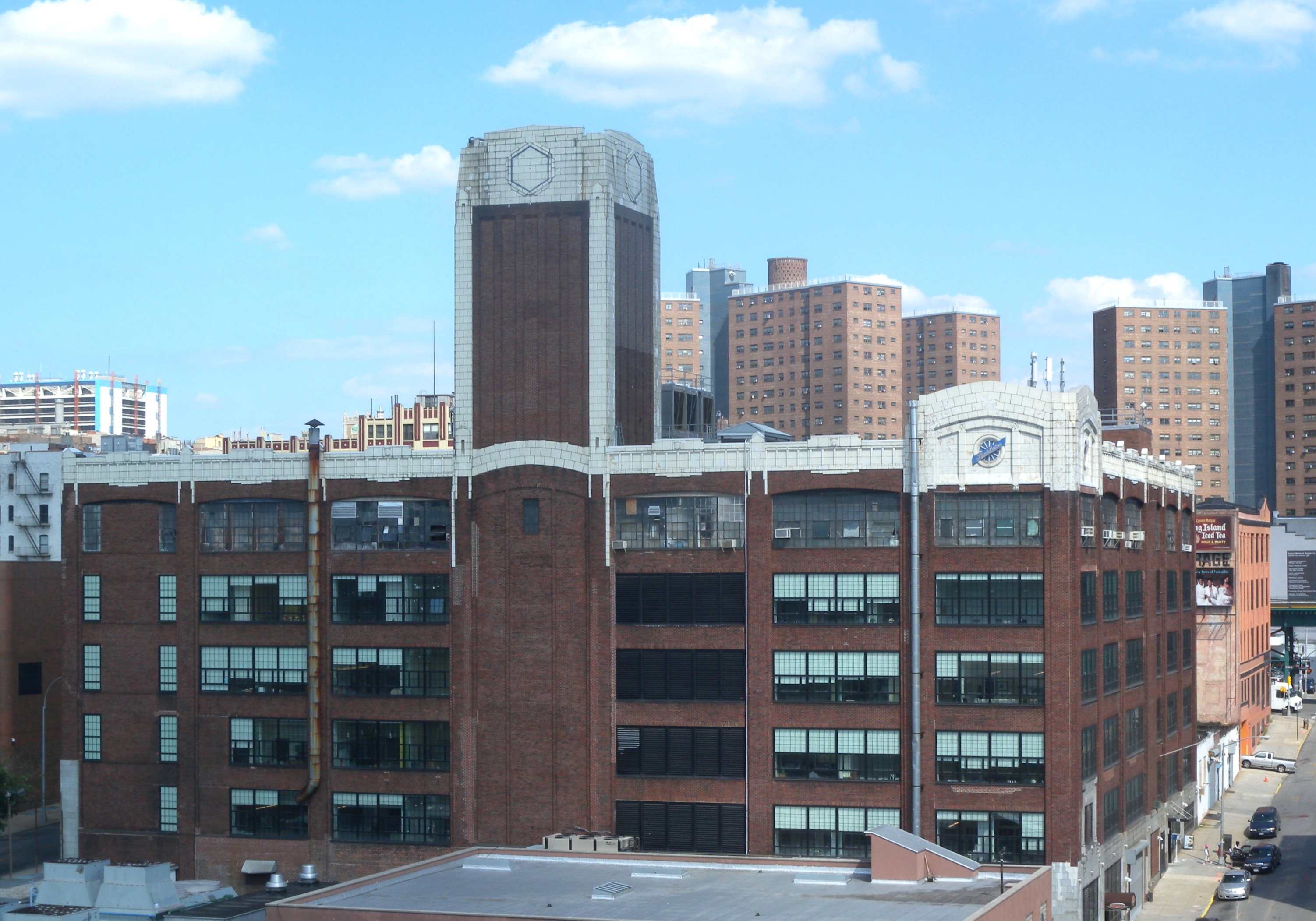
Studebaker Building in Manhattanville, New York City

The Studebaker Building is located at 615 West 131st Street, between Broadway and 12th Avenue, and between 131st and 132nd Streets, in the Manhattanville section of the Upper West Side in New York City. It is in the northeast quadrant of the Manhattanville Campus of Columbia University. It is near the New York City Subway and several local bus routes. It is one of three historic buildings to have been kept during the university's Manhattanville expansion, the others being Prentis Hall and the Nash Building.

The former Studebaker automobile finishing plant, complete with a freight elevator, was constructed in 1923. It is constructed largely of brick with a decorative white porcelain trim, is 6 stories tall, has a plot size of 175 feet by 200 feet, and has 210,000 square feet of floorspace. The blue Studebaker logo used between 1912 and 1934 is still visible on the southwest corner near the top. Originally built as a finishing plant, it was later used to store and distribute cars and parts manufactured in South Bend, Indiana, as a sales and services headquarters for the company.

Studebaker sold the building due to declining profits to the Borden Milk Company in 1937, which used it as a milk processing plant. Later it was home to various warehouses (e.g. for the American Museum of Natural History), offices, and small manufacturing facilities such as the Madame Alexander doll company and Scientific Prototypes which manufactured sirens for every NYPD police vehicle from 1979 until 1989. In the late 1980s, Columbia University began to rent office space there, and subsequently bought the building.

In 2007, most of the Finance department for the University, including the Student Financial Services department, moved to the Studebaker Building from the historic Kent Hall.
