= Mount Morris Bank Building =

Historic commercial building in Manhattan, New York

- Mount Morris Bank
- U.S. National Register of Historic Places
- New York State Register of Historic Places
- New York City Landmark
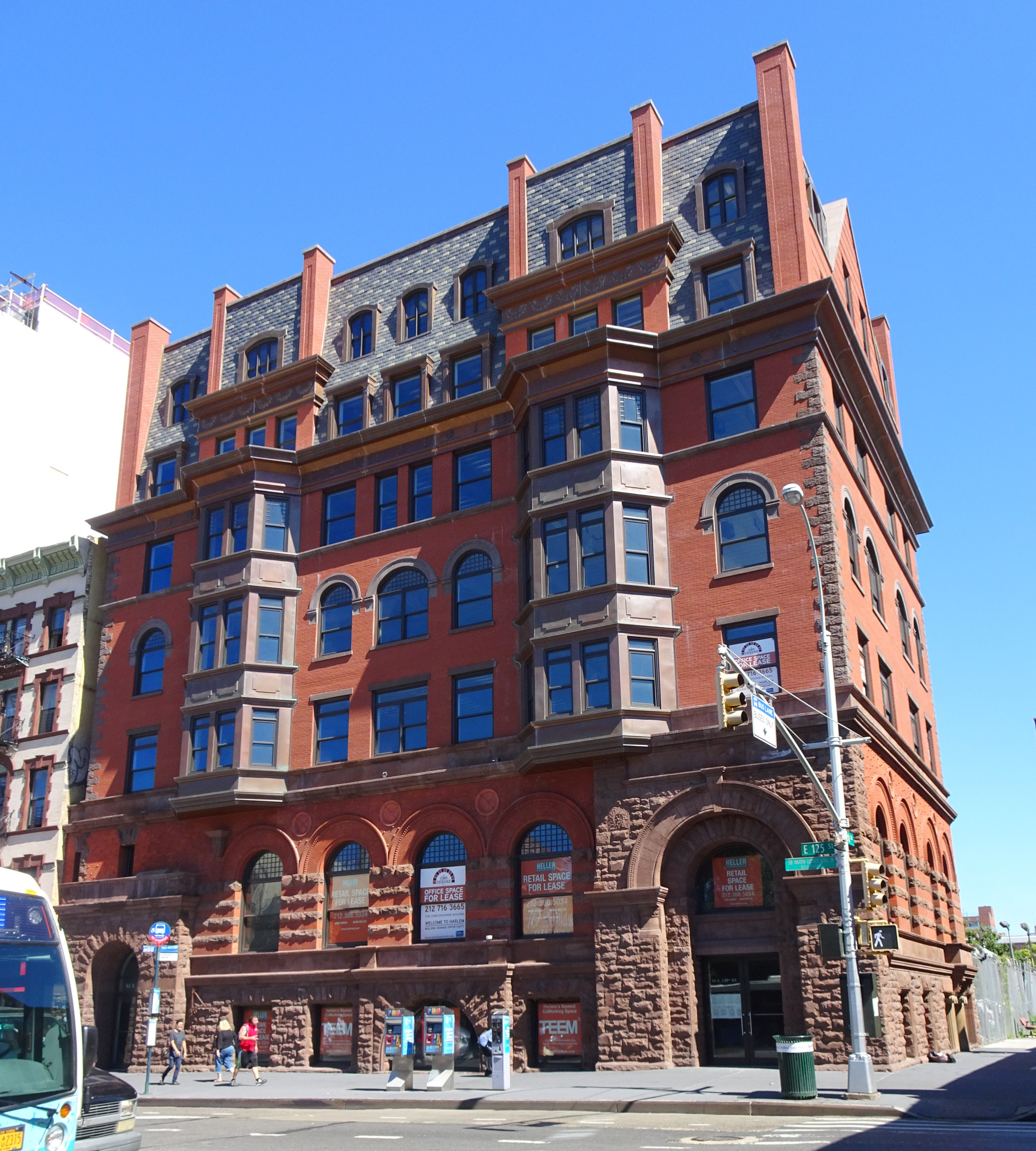
- 2016
- Location: 81-85 East 125th Street at Park Avenue; Manhattan, New York City
- Coordinates: 40°48′19″N 73°56′22″W
- Built: 1883-84, enlarged 1889-90
- Architect: Lamb & Rich
- Architectural style: Queen Anne, Richardson Romanesque
- NRHP reference No.: 89002087
- NYSRHP No.: 06101.001794
- NYCL No.: 1839

Significant dates
- Added to NRHP: December 7, 1989
- Designated NYSRHP: October 17, 1989
- Designated NYCL: January 5, 1993

The Mount Morris Bank Building, also referred to as the Corn Exchange Bank (Mount Morris Branch) and Corn Exchange Building, is an historic building in the East Harlem neighborhood of Manhattan, New York City, located at 81-85 East 125th Street on the northwest corner of Park Avenue. It was designed by Lamb & Rich in the Queen Anne and Richardson Romanesque styles. Although an architectural standout when new in 1883, by the late 1970s it was vacant, and remained so for three decades, vandalized and deteriorating. In 2009 the city demolished, for safety, most of what remained after a 1997 fire, but in 2012 a developer undertook to rebuild it for commercial occupancy, and the building reopened in May 2015.

The building was added to the National Register of Historic Places in 1989, and was designated a New York City Landmark in 1993.

== The banking years ==
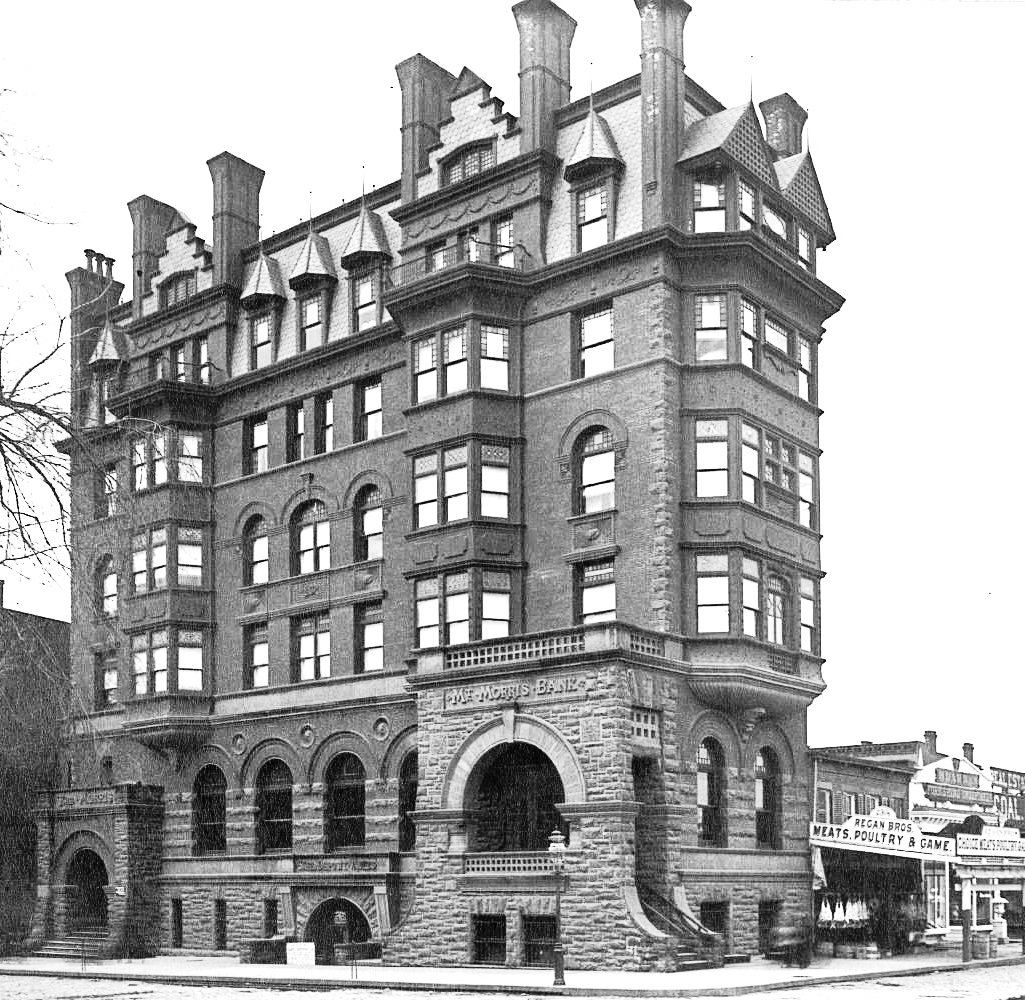
Sometime between 1883 and 1889

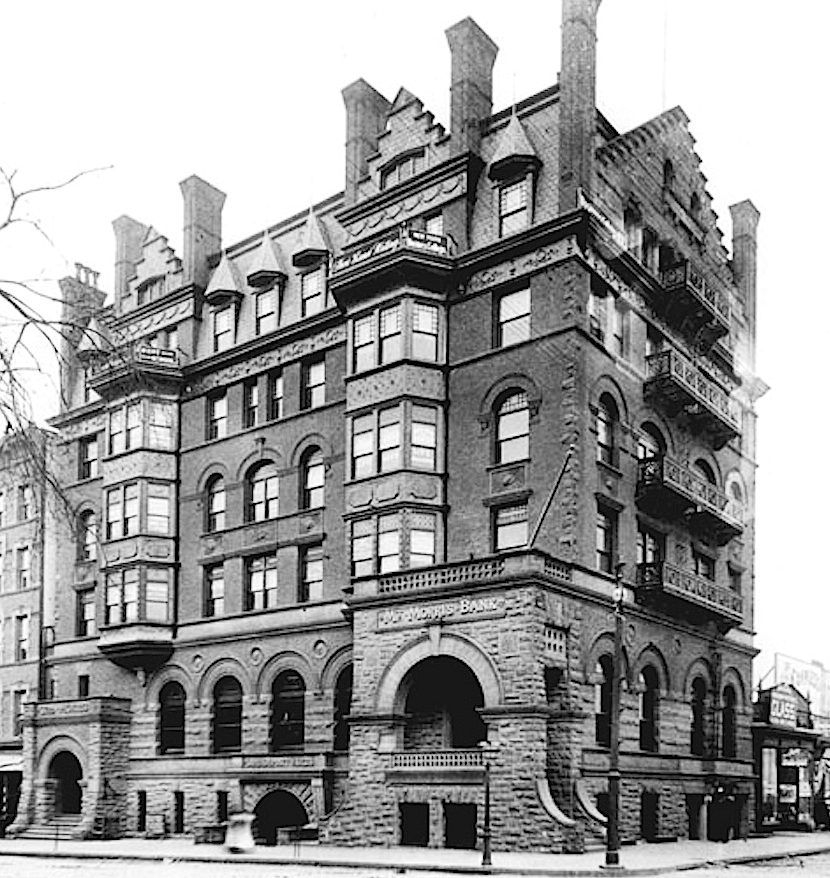
Circa 1895; note doubled width and redesigned facade

The Mount Morris Bank was organized in December 1880 when Harlem was being transformed from a suburb into an urban residential neighborhood, connected to downtown commercial and residential districts by the new Manhattan Railway Company lines. The bank initially rented space at 133 East 125th Street, just west of Lexington Avenue.

Construction began on its new building – which was selected by competition and located at 81, 83, and 85 East 125th Street – on April 3, 1883 and was completed on February 1, 1884, although the bank, occupying the main floor, moved in by late 1883. Like its plainer neighbors, the building was designed for a mix of commercial and residential use. The basement, partially above ground, was initially occupied by the Mount Morris Safe Deposit Company at #83, which built and owned the building. There were six apartments on four floors above the commercial space, plus an attic. The apartments – called "The Morris" – were completely separated from the banking portion of the building. They had their own entrance at #81 and were served by an elevator, but they barely lasted two decades: by the early twentieth century the apartments were converted into offices.

Architects Lamb & Rich utilized rock-faced sandstone in the Romanesque Revival style for the bank portions of the structure and red Philadelphia brick cladding for the residential portion in the Queen Anne style.

At the time, the New York Central Railroad ran in an open cut along Park Avenue, with a (below-grade) station at 125th Street. The building's location was thus convenient for commuters as well as for commerce.

In 1889-90 the building was doubled in size using the adjacent lot on its north (Park Avenue) side, in an expansion designed by the original architects, which included a basement entrance at 1820 Park Avenue. In 1912, architect Frank A. Rooke removed the front stoops and stairs, which projected onto the public sidewalk, and rebuilt the entranceways.

In 1913 the Mount Morris Bank became a branch of the Corn Exchange Bank, the first New York City bank to establish local branches. The Corn Exchange Bank had previously operated its Harlem branch at 153 West 125th Street and then 101 West 125th Street. The Corn Exchange Bank merged with Chemical Bank in 1954 and became the Chemical Corn Exchange Bank. Chemical closed the branch in the mid 1960s and moved its operations to a new location nearby, following which various commercial tenants and a church occupied the building. New York City took title in 1972 for back taxes.

== Destruction and rebuilding ==
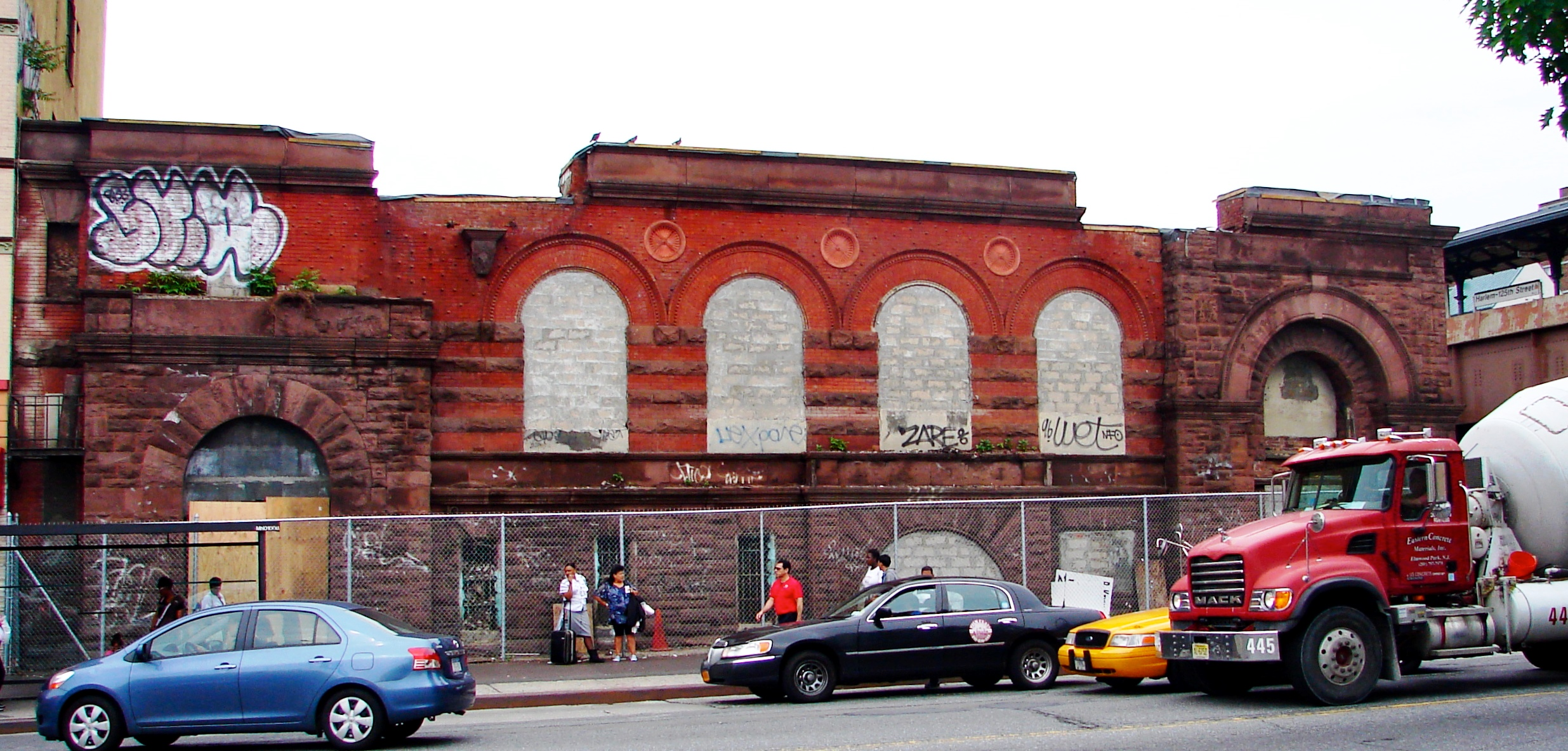
The building in 2011

By the late 1970s, when properties were being abandoned all over the city, the Corn Exchange structure was vacant, and remained mostly empty for three decades, vandalized and deteriorating. It was sealed up in 1987 at the request of the local Community Board. In 1989 it was added to the National Register of Historic Places.

The city's Landmarks Preservation Commission considered the structure for designation as an official landmark in 1984, but didn't act at that time; in 1993, however, they did designate it, asserting that it retained its architectural integrity to a surprisingly high degree. (By law, the commission's powers over a city-owned property are merely advisory.)

A fire destroyed the mansard roof and the two floors enclosed by it in 1997. In 2003 a community activist paid $10,000 for the building, planning a culinary school, but she was unable to finance her project, and the idea was never executed.

The city repossessed the building in 2000 and in 2009 demolished all but the basement and main floor, for safety's sake. Developer Artimus Construction purchased the structure in 2012 and undertook to rebuild it for commercial and retail occupancy. The design, by Danois Architects, is not intended to be an exact copy of the original, but rather strongly suggestive of it, and was approved by the Landmarks Preservation Commission in 2013.

The Corn Exchange Building reopened with an art fair in May 2015.

== See also ==
- List of New York City Designated Landmarks in Manhattan above 110th Street
- National Register of Historic Places listings in Manhattan above 110th Street

== Sources ==
- Dolkart, Andrew Scott; Pearson, Marjorie (January 5, 1993). Mount Morris Bank Building Designation Report (PDF) (Report). New York City Landmarks Preservation Commission.
