= Maha Al-Saati =

Saudi Arabian filmmaker

Maha Al-Saati مها الساعاتي
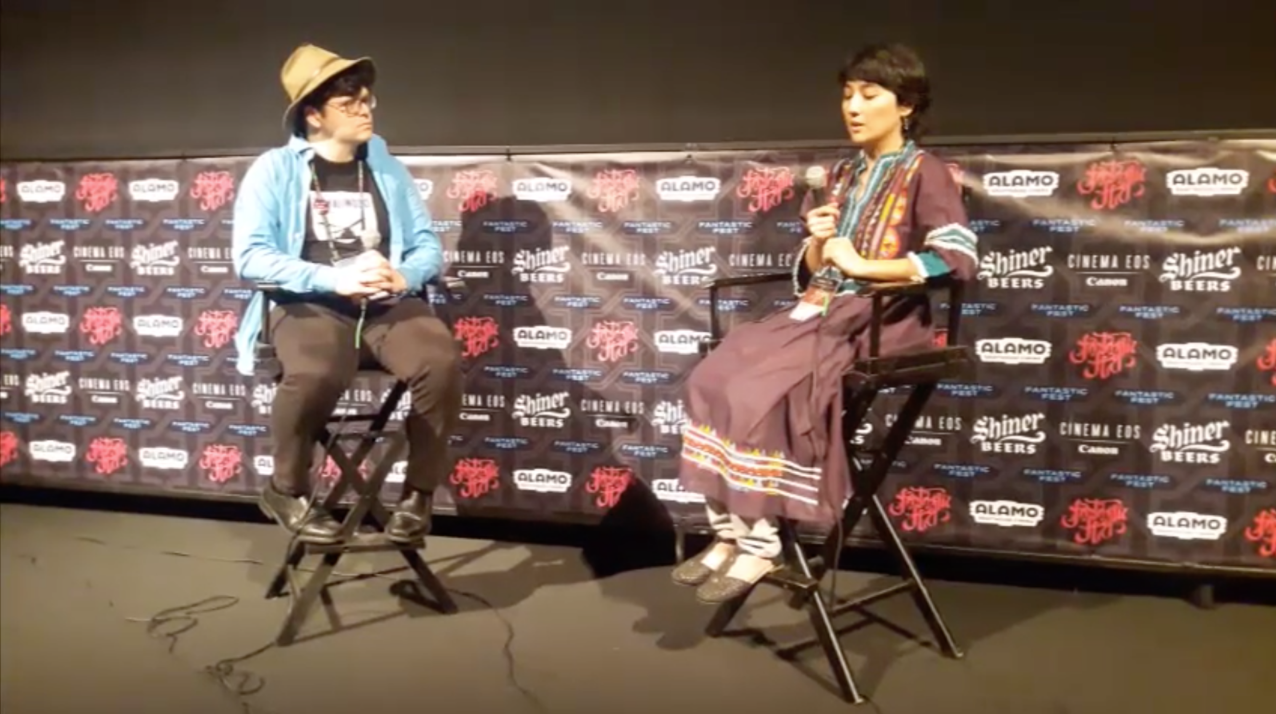
- Maha Al-Saati at Fantastic Fest 2017
- Education: PhD in Interactive Arts and Technology
- Alma mater: Simon Fraser University
- Occupations: University Professor, Filmmaker

Maha Al-Saati (Arabic: مها الساعاتي) is a Saudi Arabian filmmaker, media educator and graduate of Simon Fraser University who has taught both in Vancouver, Canada and Saudi Arabia. Her academic research covers the representation of architectural spaces, education through the use of film, and the influence of religion and culture on media. She descends from Arab and Uzbek heritage.

== Film style and themes ==
Al-Saati's style leans toward genre and fantasy filmmaking, and is inspired by fairytales, classical Disney cartoons, and 80s-90s American pop culture and music videos. She uses satire to critique consumerist culture, in addition to exploring issues of religion, gender, race, the environment and animal mistreatment films have played in genre and fantasy festivals such as Fantastic Fest, and the Avant-Garde and Genre section of the 2023 BAFICI (Buenos Aires International Festival of Independent Cinema). Her projects have also been featured in TIFF labs, where she received the TIFF Share Her Journey award, Nouveau Marché of Festival du nouveau cinéma, El Gouna Film Festival, and Red Sea International Film Festival.

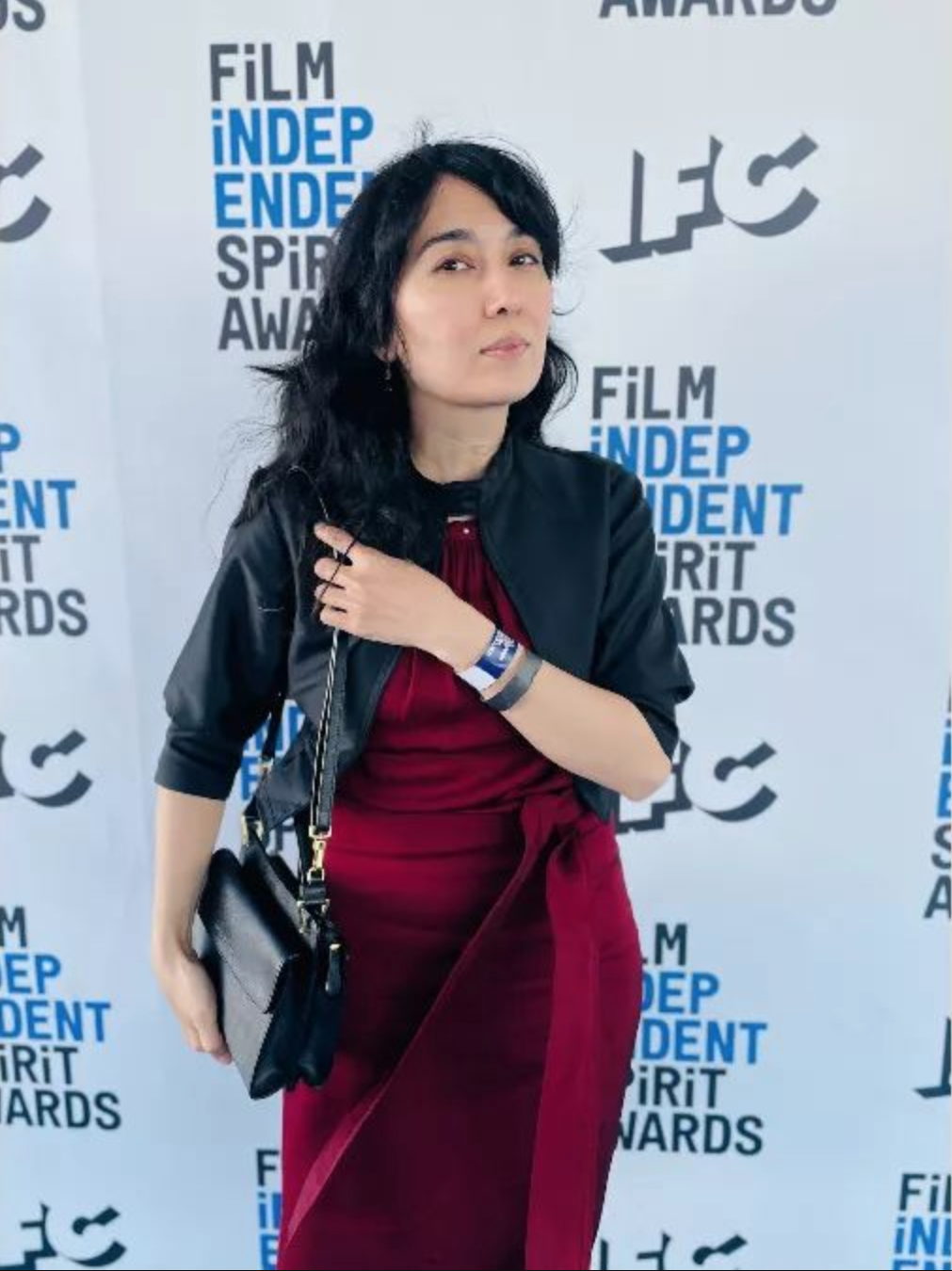
Al-Saati at the Independent Spirit Awards 2022

Her film, "Fear: Audibly" (2017) is about a girl's fear of the trumpet of doom which will end the world. The film reflects a religious period in Saudi Arabia between the 1980s and 1990s. Its dependence on sound is influenced by the Islamic restriction on visual depictions, often depending on oral narrations distributed through cassette tapes. It also features the mistreatment of stray cats. Her film Hair: The Story of Grass (2018) critiques the beauty standards regarding body hair in the Arab World, in addition to a critique of urban growth in the killing of plantation and trees. This film has won Al-Saati the Hollywood Foreign Press Association (HFPA) residency award of 2021.

== Collaborations ==
Al-Saati collaborated with American electronic opera composer Alice Shields on to compose the music for Cycle of Apples (2019).

Her short film "VHS Tape Replaced" (2022) is a romantic comedy exploring the 1980s Saudi Arabia and features a young black man who mimics Prince (musician) to win the love of a girl. The film also stars Saudi actress Sarah Taibah, who was awarded The Chopard Rising Star Award. The film music was composed by Austrian violinist Yury Revich and has received an Honorable Mention at Fantastic Fest.

== Filmography ==
Year	Title	Role	Genre	Festival Screenings	Awards
2016	Elo's Nest	Director, writer, editor, producer	Short Film	Bare Bones International Film Festival	
2017	Fear Audibly	Director, writer, editor, producer	Short Film	Fantastic Fest, Toronto Arab Film Festival	
2018	Hair: The Story of Grass	Director, writer, editor, producer	Short Film	Fantastic Fest, Slamdance Film Festival, HollyShorts Film Festival, Chattanooga Film Festival	The Hollywood Foreign Press Association (HFPA) residency award of 2021
2018	E-pidemic	Director, editor	Episode	Qomrah 3	
2019	Cycle of Apples	Director, writer, editor, producer	Short Film	HollyShorts Film Festival2020 otherworldly block Mizna#Twin Cities Arab Film Festival, Malmö Arab Film Festival, Maskoon Fantastic Film Festival - AFLAMUNA, Beirut International Women Film FestivalThe Arab Film and Media Institute (AFMI) screening at The Academy of Motion Picture Arts and Sciences.	The short film was based on a 1-minute looping version titled "Eat Me: Cycle of Apples" which was featured in the TIFFxInstagram competition of 2018.
2022	VHS Tape Replaced	Director, writer, editor	Short Film	Palm Springs International Festival of Short Films, Fantastic Fest Shorts with Legs competition, HollyShorts Film Festival "Period Piece" section, Red Sea International Film Festival, The Aswan International Women's Film Festival, The 24th Buenos Aires International Festival of Independent Cinema Avant-Garde and Genre competition.	Honorable Mention at Fantastic Fest. Audience Award for Best International Short Florida Film Festival. Best Short Film Award at Mizna. Best Score in NewFilmmakers LA festival NFMLA). The Nahed Nasrallah Jury Award of Aswan International Women's Film Festival;
