= John M. Greene Hall =

1910 concert hall in Massachusetts, US

Coordinates: 42°19′10″N 72°38′17″W

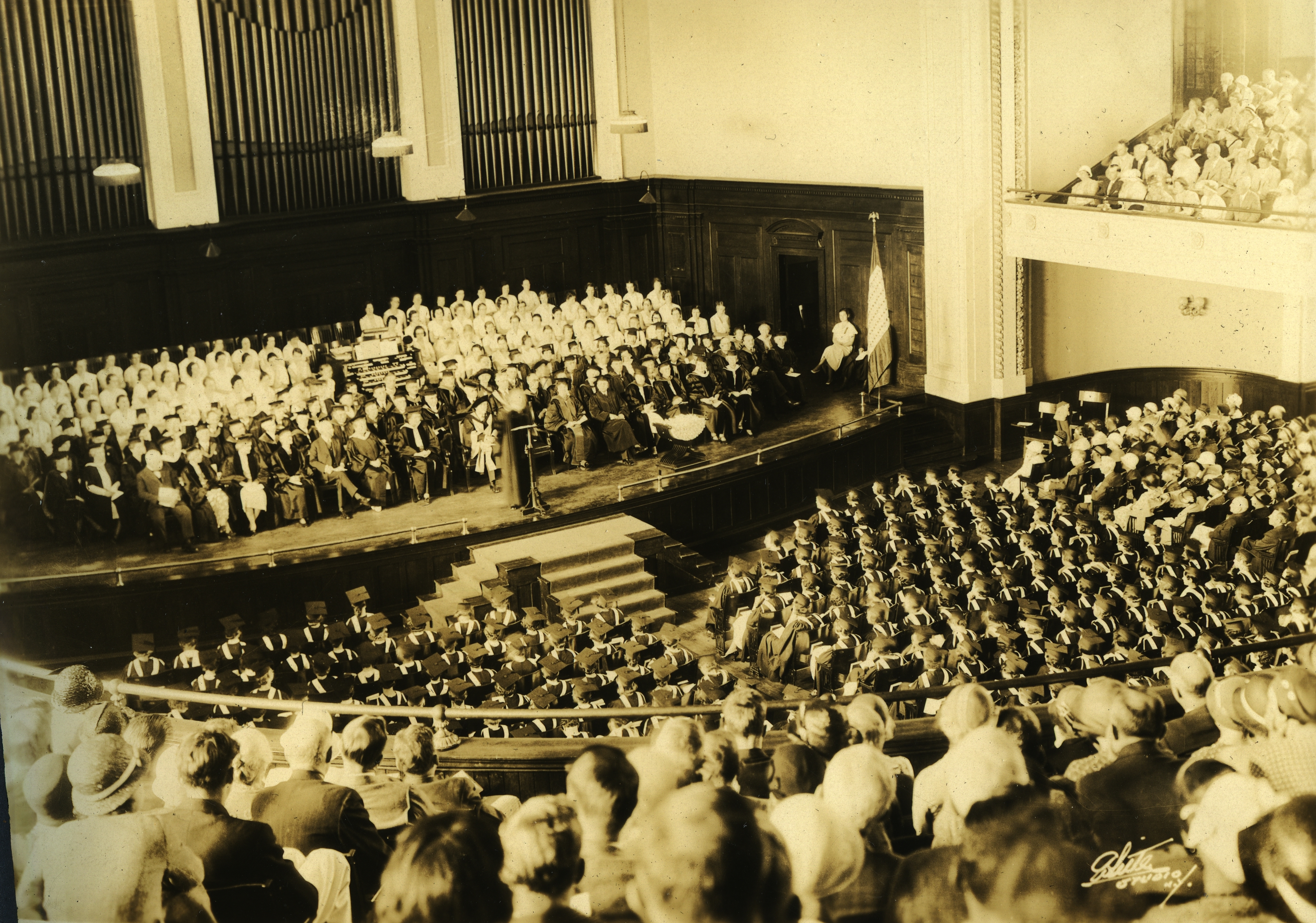
1917 Smith College graduation in John M Greene Hall

John M. Greene Hall is a Classical Revival-style auditorium located on the campus of Smith College in Northampton, Massachusetts. Completed in 1910, the hall was designed by New York architect Charles A. Rich of the Architectural Firm, Lamb and Rich and constructed by the Boston-based firm of Hurton & Hemenway. It was named in honor of Reverend John M. Greene, whose counsel significantly influenced Sophia Smith’s decision to establish the college.

The hall features a seating capacity of 2,225 and has served as a central venue for numerous significant events. Notably, it hosts the annual Silver Chord Bowl, the region’s oldest collegiate a cappella showcase, attracting esteemed groups from various institutions. Over the years, John M. Greene Hall has also been the stage for performances by renowned artists such as Bob Weir, the Indigo Girls, the Pixies, Ani DiFranco, and Nobel Laureate Bob Dylan. In September 2021, the hall was the site of a colloquium featuring House Speaker Nancy Pelosi, an event that drew significant attention and public demonstrations.
