= Lamb and Rich =

American architectural firm

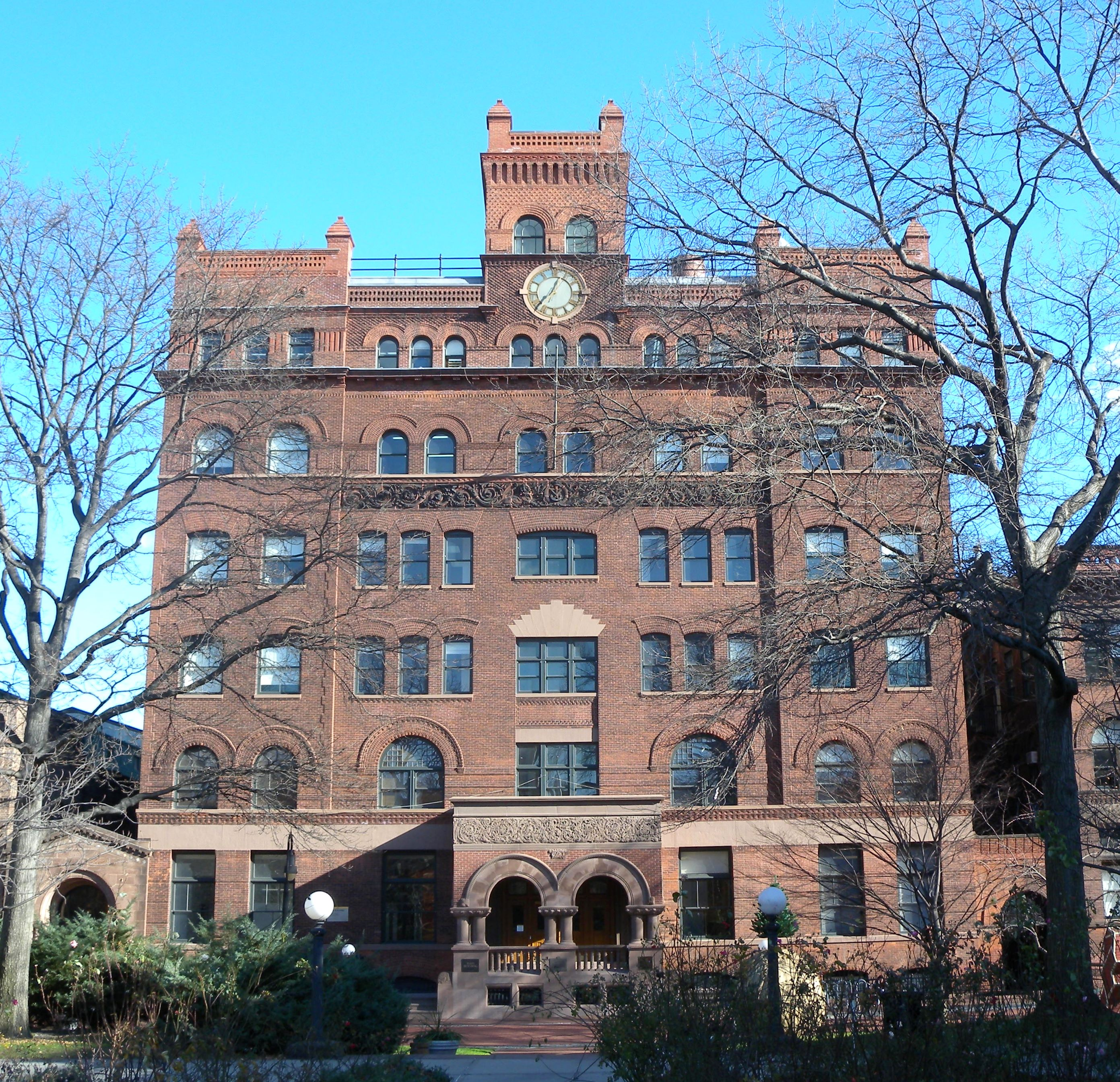
Main Building at Pratt Institute, completed in 1887

Hugh Lamb (c. 1850–1903) and Charles Alonzo Rich (c. 1850–1943) were partners in the New York City architecture firm of Lamb & Rich, which operated from 1880 to 1899. The firm was preceded by the firm of Lamb & Wheeler (1877–1881) and succeeded by the firms of Charles A. Rich, Architect (1899–1916), Rich & Mathesius (1916–1928), and Rich, Mathesius & Koyl (1928–1932).

Both were born about 1850. Lamb was a native of Scotland; Rich was born in Beverly, Massachusetts, and attended Dartmouth College. Not much is known of their training, but various sources indicate that Lamb generally handled the firm's business side and Rich was the designer. Most of the firm's projects were located within commuting distance of Manhattan, with a cluster in New Hampshire, especially at Dartmouth College. Art historian Vincent J. Scully Jr. noted the vitality of their designs in his 1971 book, The Shingle Style and the Stick Style: Architectural Theory and Design From Richardson to the Origins of Wright (Yale University Press, 1955, revised 1971).

One of their earliest commissions was Henderson Place, a tight-knit group of two dozen houses built in 1882 and located at 86th Street and East End Avenue in Manhattan. They also designed:

- Sagamore Hill (20 Sagamore Hill Road, Oyster Bay, New York. Completed 1885. Theodore Roosevelt's country house
- Mount Morris Bank Building, E. 125th St. & Park Ave., New York, NY (1883) – Mostly demolished and reconstructed
- Main Building at Pratt Institute in Brooklyn (1887). Victorian Renaissance revival style
- Astral Apartments (commissioned by Charles Pratt-built 1885/86) at 184 Franklin St. in Greenpoint, Brooklyn (national register #82001178). Queen Anne style
- Frank Babbott house at 153 Lincoln Place in Park Slope, Brooklyn
- Milbank Hall, Barnard College, New York, NY (1896–98)
- John M. Greene Hall at Smith College in Northampton, Massachusetts
- "Copshaholm," James Oliver's house in South Bend, Indiana.
- Germania Fire Insurance Co. Building, 62 William St., New York, NY (1891)
- Claremont Town Hall, 58 Opera House Sq., Claremont, NH (1895–97) – The City Hall since 1947.

== Sources ==
- Scott Meacham, Lamb & Rich, Architects, and Related Firms: Buildings and Projects, 1877–1932 (2013) Dartmo.com website
- "Lamb and Rich" New York Architecture website
