= Michiko Toyama =

Michiko Françoise Toyama (September 1, 1912 – March 31, 2006) was a Japanese modernist composer. She was one of the first foreign composers to be invited to work at Columbia–Princeton Electronic Music Center (today known as the Computer Music Center). Her elder brother was Osamu Toyama, a chemist who served as president of Osaka Prefecture University.

== Biography ==
Toyama was born in Nakanoshima, Osaka, to Sutezō Toyama and Haru (Haruko) Toyama. Her paternal grandfather, Shūzō Toyama, and her father were both businessmen. Toyama's mother, Haruko, was one of the first women who went to the Tokyo Music School, where she studied piano, and later served as an officer of the Piano Society; she encouraged her daughter's musical education from an early age. Toyama grew up in a well-to-do household in which both parents were at home with music.

She studied piano with the Russian pianist Pavel Kovalyov, who was lodging at the family home near Hamaderakōen Station. In order to devote herself to the piano, she left Hagoromo Girls' High School — where her father was the school's proprietor — after two years. On April 23, 1928, she appeared as a pianist in a charity concert of the Piano Society, billed as a debut recital of Osaka's rising women pianists.

Having taught herself French, Toyama traveled alone to Paris in 1929 to study piano with Henri Gil-Marchex. From 1934 she studied composition with Nadia Boulanger at the École Normale de Musique. In 1937, Jacques Ibert recommended that Toyama submit her composition Voice of Yamato to the 15th Festival of the International Society for Contemporary Music (ISCM), held in Paris, where it won a prize — making her the first Japanese composer to be awarded in an international competition. She returned to Japan in 1939.

She married in 1941 and had a son and a daughter, but her husband was killed in the war in 1945. Beginning in 1951, she was appointed associate professor at the Osaka Academy of Music, teaching piano and counterpoint. Her students included Masao Ōno and Shūji Honda.

In 1954, Toyama studied with Darius Milhaud, Olivier Messiaen, and Noël Gallon at the Paris Conservatory, earning a degree in the composition department. She was inspired by the electronic music techniques presented by Pierre Schaeffer from Radiodiffusion-Télévision Française who came to Milhaud's class. In 1955, she received a scholarship to study at Tanglewood with Roger Sessions, and she studied conducting at the Pierre Monteux School. In the late 1950s she served as the first visiting composer at the pioneering Columbia–Princeton Electronic Music Center (CPEMC) with Dr. Otto Luening and Dr. Vladimir Ussachevsky. Around that time, Toyama and Edgard Varèse shared an enthusiasm for Japanese gagaku court music.

She returned to Japan in 1959 and subsequently became a research student in the Department of Electronic Engineering at Kyoto University, the Department of Information Science at the University of Tokyo, and the Radio Research Laboratories of the Ministry of Posts and Telecommunications, where she conducted research in acoustics.

In 1960, Toyama's compositions were released on Folkways Records Album No. FW 8881. In 1993, The Voice of Yamato received its first performance in Japan at "Music of Our Time 1993," presented by the Japan Society for Contemporary Music after its performance in Paris at the International Society for Contemporary Music in 1937.

Toyama said, "Composing music is my joy and I do it for myself. I hope my compositions will be performed, but I do not dare to organize performance opportunities for my compositions by myself."

== Works ==
Toyama published her music under the name Michiko Toyama. Her compositions include:

=== Electronic ===
- Aoi No Ue (tape and narrator, 1959)
- Waka (tape and narrator; text by Hyaku-nin Shu, 1958)

=== Orchestra ===
- Violin Concerto (1953)
- Suite on Japanese Folk Songs (1956)
- Passacaglia for orchestra (1957)

=== Vocal ===
- Voice of Yamato (soprano, flute, clarinet, bassoon and cello, 1937)
- Two Old Japanese Folk Songs with Koto Accompaniment (1958)

== Discography ==
- Waka and Other Compositions: Contemporary Music of Japan (1960), Folkways Records, Album No. FW 8881. Original liner notes at Smithsonian Folkways.

== Bibliography ==
- Shiotsu, Yoko (May 2010). "「ピアノ同好会」の活動 [Activities of the Piano Enthusiasts' Association]". 大阪音楽大学音楽博物館年報 [Annual Report of the Osaka College of Music Museum] (in Japanese). 25. Osaka College of Music: 1–14. ISSN 1349-4201.
- Nishihara, Minoru (May 18, 2015). "7. 日本のピアノ [The Piano in Japan]". ピアノの誕生・増補版 [The Birth of the Piano, Expanded Edition]. Seikyusha Renaissance (in Japanese). Vol. 5. Seikyusha. pp. 118–218. ISBN 978-4-7872-7331-4.
- Tsuji, Hiromi (March 20, 1999). "16. 日本の女性作曲家 [Women Composers in Japan]". In Kobayashi, Midori (ed.). 女性作曲家列伝 [Biographies of Women Composers]. Heibonsha Sensho (in Japanese). Vol. 189. Heibonsha. pp. 279–308. ISBN 9784582841893.
- Yamamoto, Hisashi (October 1, 2014). "昭和戦前期にピアノを弾いた少女たちの人生と家族と憧憬 [The Lives, Families, and Aspirations of Girls Who Played the Piano in Prewar Shōwa Japan]". 学習院高等科紀要 [Bulletin of Gakushuin Boys' Senior High School] (in Japanese) (12): 81–99.
- Saito, Maki (September 17, 2026). "The Waymaker: Michiko Toyama Across Three Worlds, Prologue." The Mainichi.
