= Sheffield Farms Stable =

Building in Manhattan, New York

- U.S. National Register of Historic Places
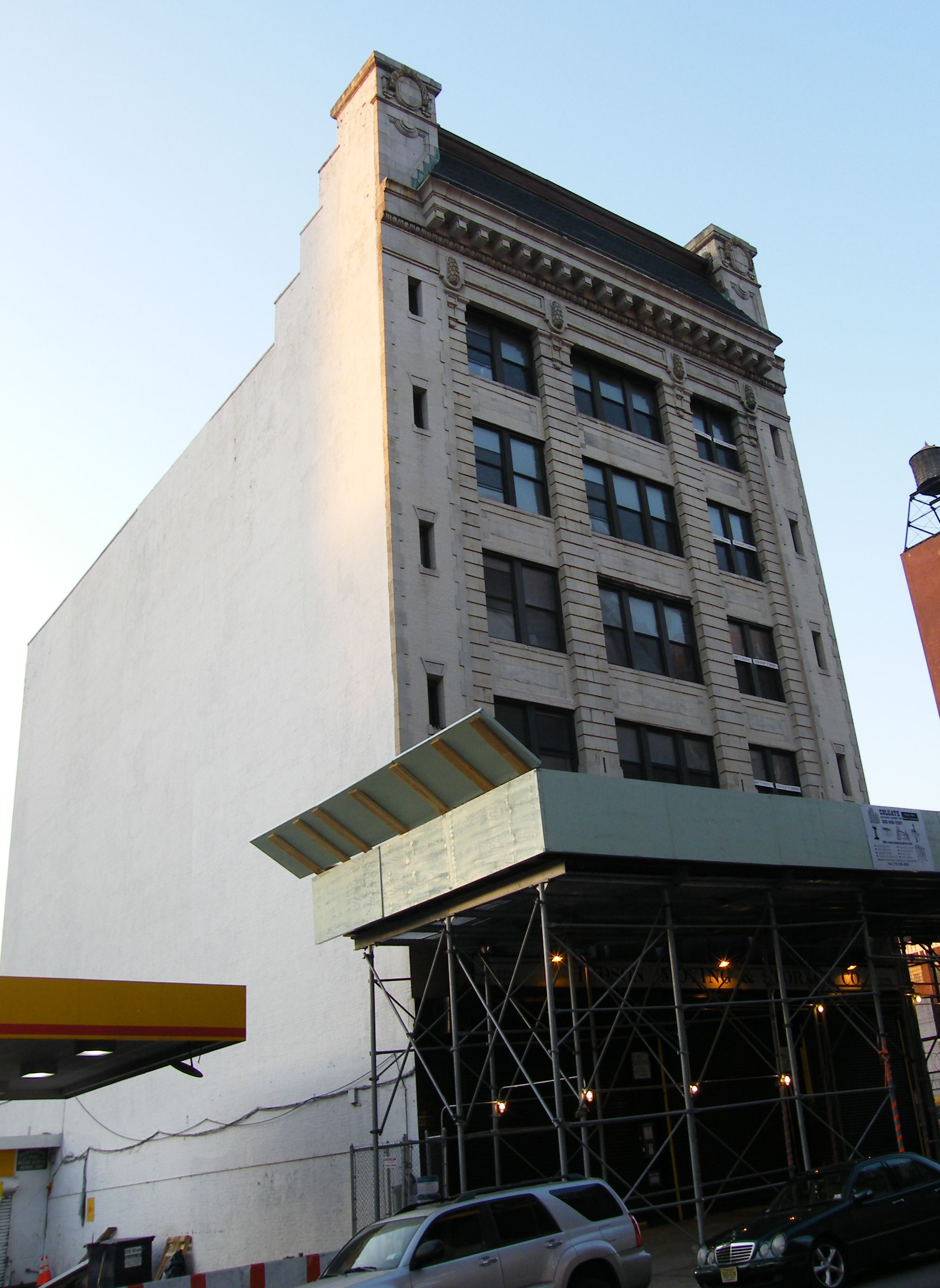
- Sheffield Farms Stable, March 2009

- Location within New York City Location within New York Location within the United States
- Location: 3229 Broadway, New York, New York
- Coordinates: 40°49′0″N 73°57′30″W
- Area: less than one acre
- Built by: Dawson & Archer
- Architect: Frank A. Rooke
- Architectural style: Renaissance
- NRHP reference No.: 05001285
- Added to NRHP: November 9, 2005

Sheffield Farms Stable was a historic stable located in Manhattanville, Manhattan, New York. Designed by Frank A. Rooke, it was a six-story, light colored brick building with terracotta ornament. It was originally built in 1903 as a two-story stable building for the Sheffield Farms dairy, then expanded to its present size in 1909. It housed horses used for the delivery of pasteurized milk until July 1938. It was sold in 1942, after which it housed a real estate company, insurance company, and warehouse.

It was listed on the National Register of Historic Places in 2005.

The site is now part of Columbia University's new Manhattanville Campus. In 2009, Columbia contracted with the building's owner, who ran a moving and storage business in it, to build her a new building at 51 Audubon Avenue, incorporating the stable's façade. The façade was dismantled in 2009, and reïnstalled in the new building in 2012.

The building has since been demolished. Today the entire blockfront is occupied by the university's Greene Science Center.
