= Alice Shields =

American classical composer (born 1943)

- Born: February 18, 1943 (age 83); Manhattan, New York, United States
- Genres: Electronic, Opera, instrumental, classical
- Occupation: Composer
- Website: aliceshields.com

Alice Shields (born Alice Ferree Shields, Manhattan, New York, February 18, 1943) is an American classical composer. She is one of the pioneers of electronic music, and is particularly known for her cross-cultural operas.

Her work is influenced by non-Western forms of music drama including Indian Bharata Natyam and Japanese Noh Theater, and has been performed by the New York City Opera VOX Festival of New American Operas, the Akademie der Künste and SAVVY-Contemporary in Berlin, the Venice Biennale, NYC-Electroacoustic Music Festival, American Chamber Opera Company, The Composers Chamber Theater, The American Virtuosi Baroque Opera Co., Association for the Promotion of New Music, New York Consort of Viols, American Composers Alliance, Ensemble Pi, Iktus Percussion, Dance Alloy (Pittsburgh), and the Arangham Dance Theater (India).

== Education ==
Shields earned three degrees from Columbia University including the Doctor of Musical Arts in music composition, studying with Vladimir Ussachevsky, Jack Beeson, Otto Luening and Chou Wen-Chung. She served as Associate Director of the Columbia-Princeton Electronic Music Center and Director for Development of the Columbia University Computer Music Center. She has taught the psychology of music as Professor of Psychology at New York University and lectures on the psychology of music at institutions including the Santa Fe Opera, CUNY Center for Developmental Neuroscience, International Society for Research on Emotion, American Psychological Association and the National Association for the Advancement of Psychoanalysis.

== Musical career ==
As a performer, Shields has been a professional opera singer, performing both traditional and modern roles with the New York City Opera, Metropolitan Opera At-The-Forum, Washington National Opera, Clarion Music Society, Wolf Trap Opera, the Lake George Opera Festival and other opera companies. She was one of the first recipients of the George London award supporting the development of young opera singers.

During the 1990s she intensively studied and performed South Indian Bharata Natyam dance-drama as a vocalist, performing nattuvangam, a form of South Indian rhythmic recitation with the Swati Bhise Bharata Natyam Dance Company, at venues including the United Nations, Asia Society and Wesleyan University. All Shields' compositions since 2000 reflect her immersion in Indian classical music and drama. Since 2016 Shields has been involved in the study of Noh theater with Noh performer Mayo Miwa, with whom she has collaborated on works using aspects of traditional Noh Theater.

Alice Shields' work is published by the American Composers Alliance: composers.com/alice-shields, and is recorded on Koch International Classics, New World, CRI, American Composers Alliance Recordings, Tellus, Opus One and Albany Records.

== Musical works ==
=== Opera ===
- JACK DUNNE'S’ REVENGE (1966) – opera in 1 act for 2 singers & chamber orchestra; libretto & choreography by Shields in Middle English and Renaissance English, on the death-obsessed writings of John Donne & medieval English plays
- The ODYSSEY of ULYSSES the PALMIPED (Odyssey 1) (1968) – opera in 1 act for 2 singers, male chorus & 4 instruments; libretto by Shields based on Roger Gilbert-LeConte's Dada play The Odyssey of Ulysses the Palmiped
- ODYSSEY 2 (1970) – opera in 1 act for 2 singers, male chorus, piano & percussion; libretto & choreography by Shields in Noh Theater style; based on the Egyptian Book of the Dead and Roger Gilbert-LeConte's Dada play "The Odyssey of Ulysses the Palmiped": two men aggress against each other
- ODYSSEY 3 (1975) – opera in 1 act for 2 singers, male chorus & 21-piece chamber orchestra; libretto & choreography by Shields in Noh Theater style; on language from the Homeric Odyssey: Odysseus meets his son Telemachos without recognizing him, and tricks him
- SHAMAN (1987) – opera in 1 act for 4 singers, chorus, 4 instruments & fixed audio media; libretto by Shields & Edward Barrett based on Native American shamanism
- WRAECCA (1989) – opera in 1 act for 3 singers, cello & piano, based on Gregorian Chant & Anglo-Saxon poems; libretto by Shields, in which the god Odin manages to sacrifice himself
- KOMACHI AT SEKIDERA (1990) – opera in 1 act for soprano, alto flute & koto; libretto by Shields based on the Noh play Sekidera Komachi
- MASS FOR THE DEAD (1992) – opera in 1 act for 4 singers, chorus, 4 instruments & fixed audio media; libretto by Shields set in Latin, Greek and English, based on a ghost story & the Requiem Mass
- SHIVATANZ (1993) – opera in 1 act for mezzo-soprano and fixed audio media; libretto by Shields based on traditional Sanskrit hymn to the god Shiva, and poem to Devi in Hindi by Shields
- APOCALYPSE (1994) – opera in 2 acts for 3 singers, chorus, dancers, electric guitar, electronic keyboard & fixed audio media; libretto by Shields based on Greek, Gaelic, and Sanskrit texts; choreography by Shields in Bharata Natyam style
- CRISEYDE (2010) – opera in 2 acts for 4 singers, ensemble of 3 singers & 14 solo instruments; the libretto by Shields is a feminist reworking of Chaucer's Troilus and Criseyde, sung in Middle English or in Shields' adaptation in Modern English.
- ZHAOJÜN – The Woman Who Saved the World (2018) – opera in 1 act for soprano, baritone & 7 instruments; libretto by Shields, inspired by ancient Chinese poetry & plays: to stop environmental destruction & create universal peace, Zhaojün steps out of ancient times into the 21st century to confront the Emperor, the modern ruler of the world.

=== Instrument or Voice with Electronics ===
- El's Aria (1982), for soprano, flute & fixed audio media. Music and words by Shields. Created for the Gageego Ensemble.
- Rhapsody for Piano and Tape (Hommage to Brahms) (1983), for live pianist & fixed audio. The live pianist plays against electronically manipulated piano sounds based on Brahms’ Piano Concerto No.2. Created for pianist Yoland Liepa.
- The Black Lake (1984), for tenor, cello & fixed audio. Text by Edward Barrett in which a shaman wanders through the sounds of the night.
- Nightway I (1989) theater piece for ensemble of actors & fixed audio. Music and libretto by Shields based on Navajo Nightchant ceremony.
- Nightway II (1989) theater piece for 2 singers & fixed audio. Music and libretto by Shields on texts by Franklin Reeve and Shields, based on Navajo Nightchant ceremony.
- Azure (2003) for flute, violin, viola, cello & fixed audio, in Todi raga. Created for the Azure Ensemble.
- Mioritza — Requiem for Rachel Corrie (2004) for solo trombone & fixed audio, with poem by Shields. Commissioned by trombonist Monique Buzzarté.
- Kyrielle (2005) for solo violin and fixed audio, based on Gregorian chants associated with the Virgin Mary. Commissioned by violinist Airi Yoshioka.
- The River of Memory (2008) for solo trombone & fixed audio. Commissioned by trombonist Monique Buzzarté.
- The River of Memory (2020) version for solo trumpet & fixed audio, for trumpeter Sam Wells

=== Vocal and Instrumental ===
- Two Amerindian Poems (1965) for 2 unaccompanied voices, on Native American poems
- Three Songs on Poems of Samuel Beckett (1965) for voice & cello
- Sow (as in“pig”) (1966) cantata for mezzo-soprano, baritone, 2 choruses & chamber ensemble, based on Medieval English mystery plays
- Wildcat Songs (1966) for soprano & piccolo, in English, based on Native American shaman's song
- Spring Music (1967) for soprano, trumpet & oboe, on poem of Ronald Johnson
- The Storyteller (1967) cantata for bass-baritone and orchestra, on Native American story
- Richard III: Speeches for Male Actor, Trumpet and Drum (1968) incidental music for Shakespeare's “Richard III”
- Incidental Music for Solo Singer in Strindberg’s “The Father” (1968) incidental music for theater
- Neruda Songs (1981) for soprano & cello, in English, on poems of Pablo Neruda
- Levertov Songs (1986) for mezzo-soprano & viola, on poems by Denise Levertov
- Aurora. (1987) for violin & oboe
- Incidental Music for “Woyzeck” for Four Actor-Singers (1988), incidental music for four singers for Georg Büchner’s play “Woyzeck”, in English.
- Ave (1989) music-drama in one act for unaccompanied mezzo-soprano & baritone
- Rani tero (2002) for alto, four viols & tambura, on traditional poem in Hindi, in raga Puria Dhaneshri
- From the Ocean of Beauty – Saundarya Lahari (2006) for flute, viola & harp
- Hindustani Songs (2013) three songs for soprano & piano, on traditional Indian melodies
- Namasté (2013) for mezzo-soprano & piano, on traditional Indian poem
- Larynx (2018) for piccolo, piano & three percussionists
- The Wind in the Pines (2018) for soprano, alto recorder, alto flute, Renaissance bray harp, oud & percussion(1), based on the Noh play Matsukaze; commissioned by Chamber Music America

=== Electronic / Fixed Audio Media ===
- Electronic Cues for Sam Shepard’s Radio Plays “Icarus” and “4-H Club" (1966) directed by Sam Shepard & Omar Shapli, with featured actor Joseph Chaikin, for Riverside Radio (WRVR)
- Electronic Cues for Robert Ward’s opera “The Crucible” (1966) composed assisting Vladimir Ussachevsky, with Shields’ electronically manipulated singing voice, for performances at the Lake George Opera Festival
- Walking on the Surface of the Sun (1967) electronic music
- My Feathers are Growing Longer (1967) electronic music for modern dance
- Electronic Cues to Marvin Levy’s opera “Mourning Becomes Electra” (1967) composed assisting Vladimir Ussachevsky, for the Metropolitan Opera premiere at Lincoln Center of Marvin Levy's opera “Mourning Becomes Electra”, using Shields’ electronically manipulated singing voice; conducted by Zubin Mehta
- Line of Apogee (1967) electronic film score composed with Vladimir Ussachevsky & Pril Smiley for the psychedelic film “Line of Apogee” by Lloyd Williams
- Incredible Voyage (1967) the first feature-length electronic music score for television; composed with Vladimir Ussachevsky, Otto Luening & Pril Smiley for CBS-TV documentary narrated by Walter Cronkite
- The Witches’ Scenes from Macbeth (1968) electronic incidental music for the Stratford Shakespeare Festival (Conn.), directed by John Houseman
- Study for Voice and Tape (1969) Shields' recorded voice sings; on poem by Shields
- The Transformation of Ani (1970) Shields' recorded voice chants and sings from the Egyptian Book of the Dead.
- We (1970) electronic score for radio play of Yevgeny Zamiatin's 1920's futurist novel, for the Canadian Broadcasting System, composed with Vladimir Ussachevsky
- Farewell to a Hill (1975) bells, the cries of mallard ducks and electronic sounds; the first quadraphonic recording of electronic music (released by Atlantic Records)
- Listening (1976). Electronic music to accompany art therapy sessions
- Sitar (1978), fixed audio
- Coyote (1979), fixed audio. Wolf-calls, coyotes and manipulated human voices
- Shivra (1985), fixed audio
- Devouring Woman (1986), fixed audio
- Incidental Music for “Woyzeck” for Four Actor-Singers (1988) theatrical incidental music for Georg Büchner's play “Woyzeck"
- Voices (1989), fixed audio. Computer-synthesized voices created on the SUN computer using sampled Gregorian chant.
- The Red Woman (An Bean Rua) (1993) for female actor & fixed audio media; English & recorded Irish poem by Shields
- The Lament of the Fairies (Port Na bPucai) (1993) fixed audio with recorded voice singing in Irish; from the West Coast of Ireland. Voice by Virginia Shields.
- Newgrange (1993) for prerecorded soprano & fixed audio. The text in Old Irish is an inscription from the ancient tombs at Newgrange in Ireland. Voice by Virginia Shields.
- Snow (1993) for male actor & fixed audio media; on the poem “Snow,” by Greg Muirhead; the live narrator speaks of a homeless man frozen to death in the snow
- Hier Spukt Es, Fragile Breakfast, and Sparkling Brains: Three Animations created on Macromedia Director and KPT Bryce (1995–1996) poems and graphics by Alice Shields
- Vegetable Karma (1999) in Todi raga, with sounds sampled from hiphop
- Dust (2001) in Madhuwanti raga & Todi raga, with traditional Bharata Natyam jethi-s (rhythmic cycles)
- Shenandoah (2002) for modern dance, based on oral histories of recent immigrants to the Shenandoah Valley
- The Mud Oratorio (2003) for modern dance, on two Nature Conservancy swamps
- White Heron Dance (2017) electronic music, with optional video & optional live Noh Theater dancer, based on the Japanese Sagi Mai ritual: a human being experiences a moment of union with the sounds of nature
- In the summer garden, Sappho reads to her friends (2021), electronic music with Shield's recorded voice, with poetry by Sappho in ancient Greek. Commissioned by SAVVY-Contemporary, Berlin, for their project "HERE HISTORY BEGAN: Tracing the Re/Verberations, Vibrations, and Echoes of Halim El-Dabh" funded by the German Federal Cultural Foundation (Kulturstiftung des Bundes), the Goethe Institut and MaerzMusik – Festival für Zeitfragen. Premiere: Oct.24, 2021, SAVVY-Contemporary, Berlin, Germany.

== Discography ==
- Farewell to a Hill, Atlantic Records (Finnadar), the first quadraphonic recording of electronic music – 1975
- Wildcat Songs, Opus One Records #13 Stephanie Kurash, soprano; Paul Dunkel, piccolo – 1976
- Neruda Songs, Opus One Records #83 Johanna Arnold, soprano; Andre Emilianoff, cello – 1983
- Coyote, Composers Recordings Inc. CRI#495 From the electronic opera SHAMAN, with Shields' voice – 1984
- Voices, Tellus #22 Created on the SUN computer, using sampled Gregorian chant – 1988
- Rhapsody for Piano and Tape (Hommage to Brahms), Opus One Records #94 Yolanda Liepa, piano – 1984
- Line of Apogee, New World Records #80389, composed assisting Vladimir Ussachevsky – 1991
- El's Aria, Opus One records #90, aria for soprano, flute and fixed audio media from the opera SHAMAN – 1987
- Apocalypse – An Electronic Opera New World Records #NWCR647, with Michael Willson, baritone; Alice Shields, mezzo-soprano & Jim Matus, electric guitar – 1993
- Study for Voice and Tape, Dance Piece No.3, New World Records #80521, sung by Shields – 1997
- Komachi at Sekidera, Koch International Classics #3-7503-2111 – 2001
- The Transformation of Ani, New World Records #80644 (digital re-issue from 1970)- 2006
- Organ Screaming & Dawn Wind, New World Records #NWCR670, from the opera Apocalypse, sung by Shields – 2007
- Shenandoah – Three Electronic Works Albany Records #TROY699 – 2004
- The Transformation of Ani, New World Records #NWCRL268 – 2010
- Kyrelle, Albany Records #TROY1305, for violin & fixed audio media, with Airi Yoshioka, violin
- White Heron Dance, ACA Recordings #USA-ACA193428351646; based on the Japanese Sagi Mai ritual: a human being experiences a moment of union with the sounds of nature – 2018

== Filmography ==
- Cycle of Apples (2019), a collaboration between Shields and Maha Al-Saati. The film includes the opera pieces Agnus Dei (1992), Criseyde's Dream (2008), Quartet for Piano and Percussion (2016), The River of Memory for trombone & electronics (2016).
- White Heron Dance (2017), video with electronic music by Shields and computer animation by Mayo Miwa and Thomas Barratt. Created for experimental live dance collaboration with Noh Theater performer Mayo Miwa. Premiere: Association for the Promotion for the Promotion of New Music, National Opera Center, 2017.
- Hier Spukt Es, Fragile Breakfast, and Sparkling Brains (1994), three computer animations and poems by Shields in German, on video. Created on Macromedia Director and KPT Bruce software. Premiere: February 17, 1996 at Harvestworks Benefit, Pseudo Gallery, Soho, NYC.
- Bicycle Music (1977), electronic score for film on the work of sculptor Helene Brandt, using as musical instruments Brandt’s sculptures made out of bicycles along with the voices of audiences viewing her sculptures. Filmmaker: Tom Coyne. Premiere: State University of New York Stony Brook Staller Center for the Arts.
- Line of Apogee (1968), electronic score composed with Vladimir Ussachevsky, Otto Luening and Pril Smiley for psychedelic film by Lloyd Williams. Premiere: McMillin Theatre, Columbia University.
- Incredible Voyage (1967), the first feature-length electronic score for television, composed with Vladimir Ussachevsky, Otto Luening and Pril Smiley for CBS-TV documentary narrated by Walter Cronkite in which a tiny camera inserted in the human body films the inner workings of the kidney, stomach, eye, etc.
