= ArtBots =

ArtBots: The Robot Talent Show is an international robot talent show held in New York City and other cities. It is sponsored by a variety of arts organizations, produced by an army of volunteers, and is directed and curated by dorkbot founder, and teacher Douglas Repetto.

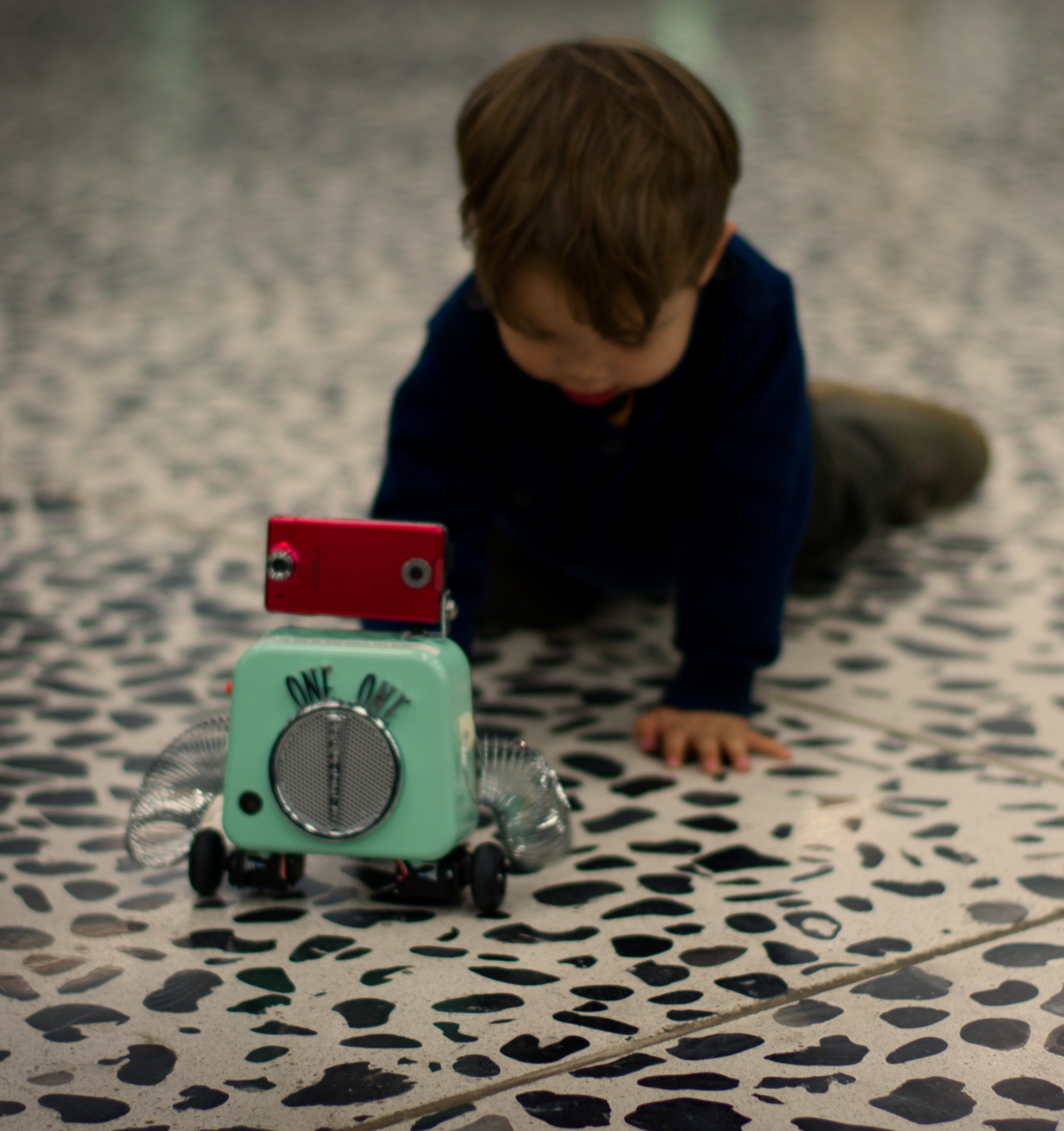
Child interacts with robot at ArtBots 2011 show.

ArtBots is vaguely modeled on a tongue-in-cheek version of Battlebots, where robotic art submissions are curated for a group show based not on their ability to fight one another, but on their ability to make (or be) art. Repetto felt that there was too much attention focused on "violent, competitive aspects of robotics" and wished to create something more comprehensive. Repetto also described how robots have a "creative side."

Robots competing in ArtBots were very diverse in function and build. An interesting inclusion was Tribbalation, a round, whiskered robot which through sensors responds to "stimuli like compliments and stroking." Neil is a humanoid robot that responds to participants and emotes moods based on its interaction. Robozoic, by Brett Doar, has a very simple brain created with a rotating cylinder which works similarly to a music box. Robots in ArtBots aren't always the art itself, for example, some robots participating draw or create music. One especially interesting artistic robot was MEART, a brain-cell/mechanical arm hybrid which creates abstract "portraits."

The show runs for a number of days, and two (nominal) prizes are awarded: the People's Choice Award goes to the work that gets the most audience votes, while the Robot Choice Award is decided on by the artists themselves. Winners of the 2003 competition included the League of Electronic Musical Urban Robots (LEMUR), which consisted of five robots which acted as self-playing instruments and took the Audience Choice Award. The winners of the Robots' Choice Award was micro.adam and micro.eva who respond to one another.

ArtBots is dedicated to the creation, presentation, and celebration of robotic art and art-making robotics, and to the promotion of the idea that robotics, and new technologies in general, are accessible, fun, intelligible, and useful, and that everyone, not just a technological elite, can participate in and influence society's technological progress. However, some artists working with electronics and robotics are invited to participate in ArtBots, showing a "kinetic tree" at the 2005 festival. Workshops have been included at some festivals to teach participants how to create their own robots.

In 2002, ArtBots was featured at the Pratt Institute. In 2003, it was held as a festival at Eyebeam, a gallery in Chelsea. Dublin hosted the 2005 festival and it was the first time ArtBots was held outside of New York. In 2006 and 2007, it took place in New York. The 2011 event took place in Gent, Belgium.
