= Kenjiro Ezaki =

Japanese composer

- 江崎 健次郎
- Born: 27 October 1926; Tainan Prefecture, Japanese Taiwan
- Occupation: composer

Kenjiro Ezaki (Japanese: 江崎健次郎, Hepburn: Ezaki Kenjiro; born 27 October 1926) is a Japanese composer of contemporary classical music, especially famous for his electronic music and computer music.

== Biography ==
Kenjiro Ezaki was born in Tainan (Taiwan). He studied at the Nihon University in Tokyo from 1953 to 1957 under Yoritsune Matsudaira and later under Vladimir Ussachevsky at the Columbia-Princeton Electronic Music Center. During his early years he received two composition awards: The first prize at Music Composition of Japan in 1956 and a first prize at the ISCM World Music Days in 1962 where his composition Beating was performed

After his return to Japan Kenjiro Ezaki founded his own electronic music studio and was a member of a composer group called "Group Design" which focused on electronic and computer music. Other members of this group were Norihiko Wada, Satoshi Sumitani, and Komei Hayama. Ezaki was also a member of GROUP 20.5, a circle of Japanese composers of avantgarde music that was founded by Hifumi Shimoyama.

Ezaki composed the first known Japanese fully computer-based composition, which was premiered at the Expo '70 in Osaka.

== Compositions ==
- Symphonic poem for orchestra Japanese scenery (1958)
- Presage by the system of mobile Configuration for Full Orchestra (1964 )
- Omen for Full Orchestra by the Modified System (1964)
- Concretion for violin, viola and cello (1962)
- Piano trio (1964)
- Pharos No.2 for flute, clarinet, oboe and piano (1964)
- Composition 5, for flute, 2 guitars, cello, percussion and soprano (1965)
- Nodule for guitar (1964)
- Discretion for female voice （女声のためのディスクレション）, for soprano and piano (1961)
- Discretation for soprano (1962)
- Concretion for three voices for soprano, tenor and baritone (1960)
- Beating for three voices and percussion (1960)
- Instruments, for soprano, tenor, bass and percussion (1961)
- Dim Light for chorus and six instruments, for mixed chorus and flute, clarinet, bassoon, violin, cello and percussion (1962)
- Moving Pulses （三声と打楽器のための動く鼓動） for three voices and percussion (1965)
- Music for guitar and electronic sound （ギターと電子音のための音楽）(1967)
