= Stephen Gaynor School =

Independent private, special education school in Manhattan, New York, United States

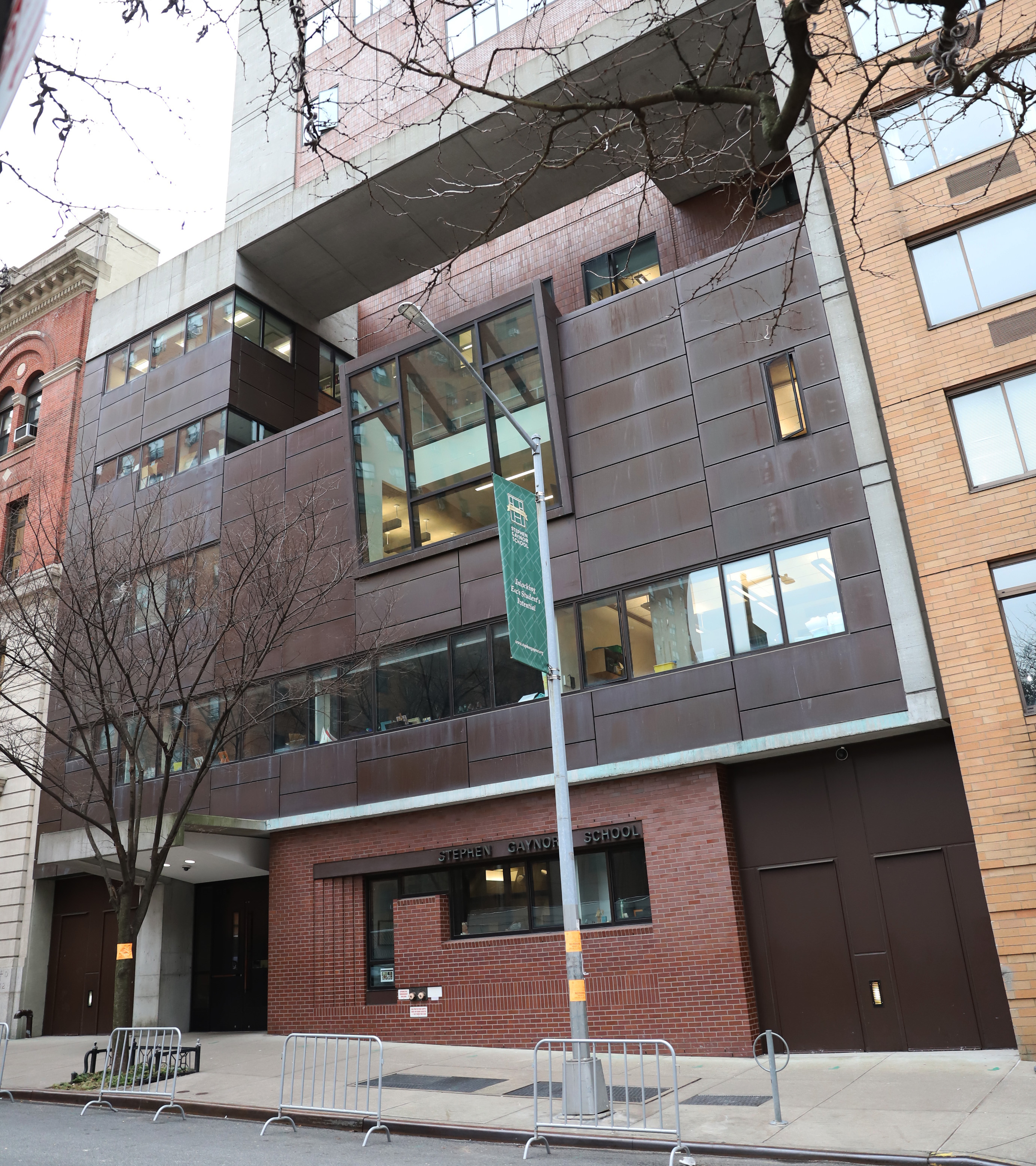
- Stephen Gaynor School Exterior 90th St. entrance

Location
- 148 West 90th Street; New York, New York 10024; United States; 40°47′22.9″N 73°58′22.9″W

Information
- Type: Independent private school, day, special education
- Religious affiliation: Nonsectarian
- Established: 1962
- Founder: Miriam Michael and Yvette Siegel-Herzog
- NCES School ID: 00942697
- Head of school: Dr. Scott Gaynor
- Teaching staff: 129.5 (on an FTE basis)
- Grades: Pre-K, K–8
- Gender: Co-educational
- Enrollment: 387
- Student to teacher ratio: 3.0
- Campus: Urban
- Colors: Green and White
- Mascot: The Gaynor Gator
- Website: stephengaynor.org

Stephen Gaynor School is an independent private, special education school in Manhattan, New York, United States, associated with New York Interschool. The school was started with five students in 1962. Today, approximately 380 students ages three to fourteen with a range of language-based learning differences attend the school. Stephen Gaynor School is a member of the New York State Association of Independent Schools NYSAIS.

The school uses Orton-Gillingham instruction, a multi-sensory teaching approach commonly associated with dyslexia, and is accredited by the Academy of Orton-Gillingham Practitioners and Educators.

Since 2007, Stephen Gaynor School has partnered with local public schools (P.S. 84 and P.S. 166) to offer free after-school help for students who are behind in reading. In the 2023–2024 school year, Stephen Gaynor School piloted a 15-week course for P.S. 84 teachers to refine their lessons on phonics.

== History ==
Stephen Gaynor School was founded in 1962 by psychologist Dr. Miriam “Mimi” Michael and educator Yvette Siegel-Herzog. They both met at New York University
