= Princeton Sound Lab =

Research laboratory in the Department of Computer Science at Princeton University

The Princeton Sound Lab is a research laboratory in the Department of Computer Science at Princeton University, in collaboration with the Department of Music. The Sound Lab conducts research in a variety of areas in computer music, including physical modeling, audio analysis, audio synthesis, programming languages for audio and multimedia, interactive controller design, psychoacoustics, and real-time systems for composition and performance.

The lab has had support from the SONY Corporation.

The facility has utilised an anechoic (echo-less) chamber for research.

== History ==
The dedicated Princeton lab was created following separation of joint research activities with Columbia University in the 1980s.
