= Sheffield Farms =

US dairy

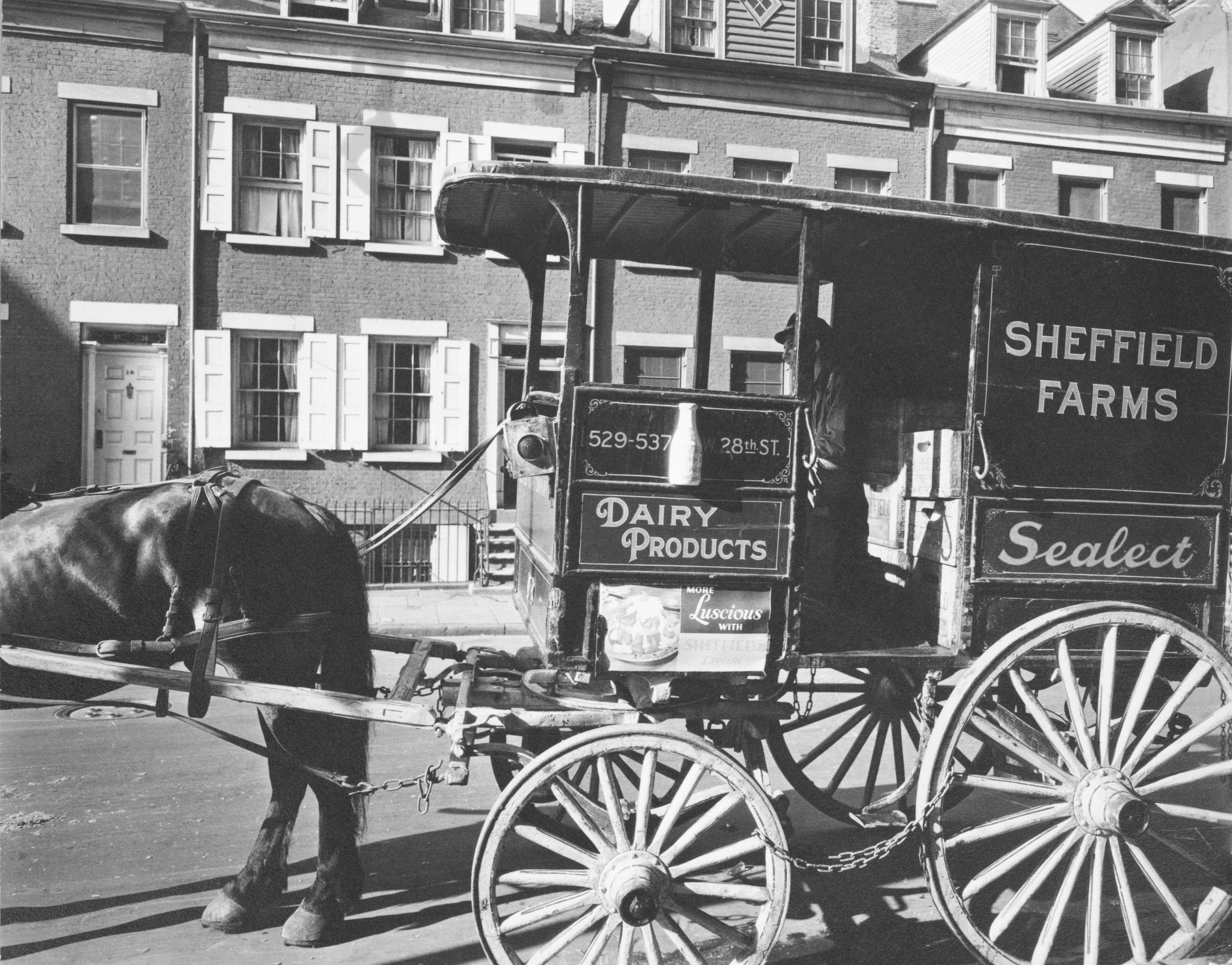
Milk wagon, 1936

The Sheffield Farms–Slawson–Decker Company, known as Sheffield Farms, was a dairy that pasteurized, bottled, and delivered milk in New York City in the first half of the 20th century. It became one of the largest dairy companies in the world, selling 20% of the city's milk. The company played a major part in transforming commercial milk into a clean and healthy product.

== History ==
L. B. Halsey, a lawyer who married Sarah Frances Sheffield (daughter of the late John H. and Anne Maria Sheffield), became interested in the dairy business when called upon to help deliver his widowed mother-in-law’s butter. Through careful selection and breeding, the Sheffield herd of Mahwah, New Jersey, produced superior milk, which in turn made fine butter. He began marketing the butter in his spare time in the city and, by 1880, had given up the law to devote himself to the dairy trade. His first innovation was to design a covered milk wagon that protected fluid milk from dust. Halsey trained other farmers to improve the quality of their milk and bought milk only from the best herds.

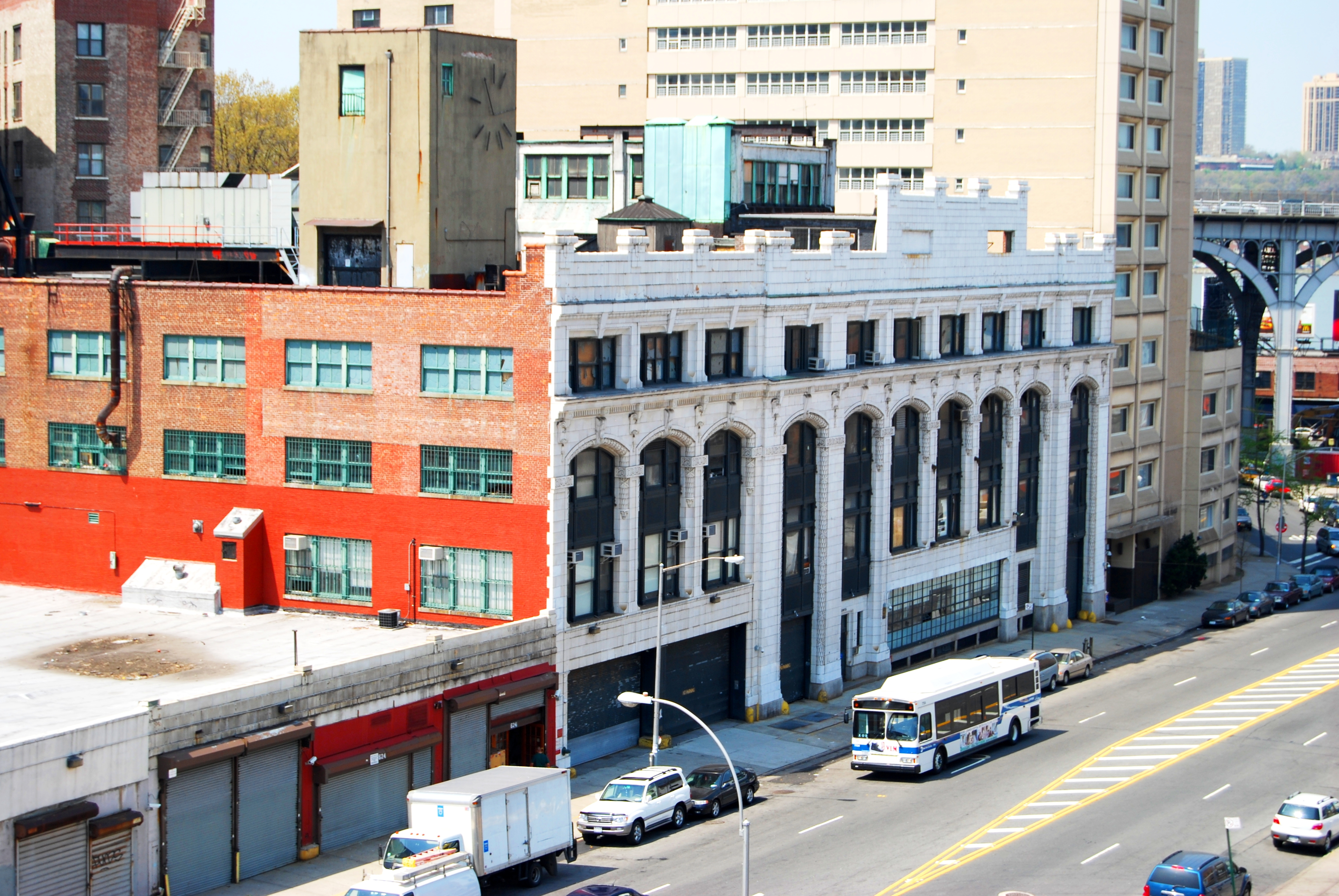
Prentis Hall, formerly a Sheffield Farms dairy plant, on 125th Street in New York City

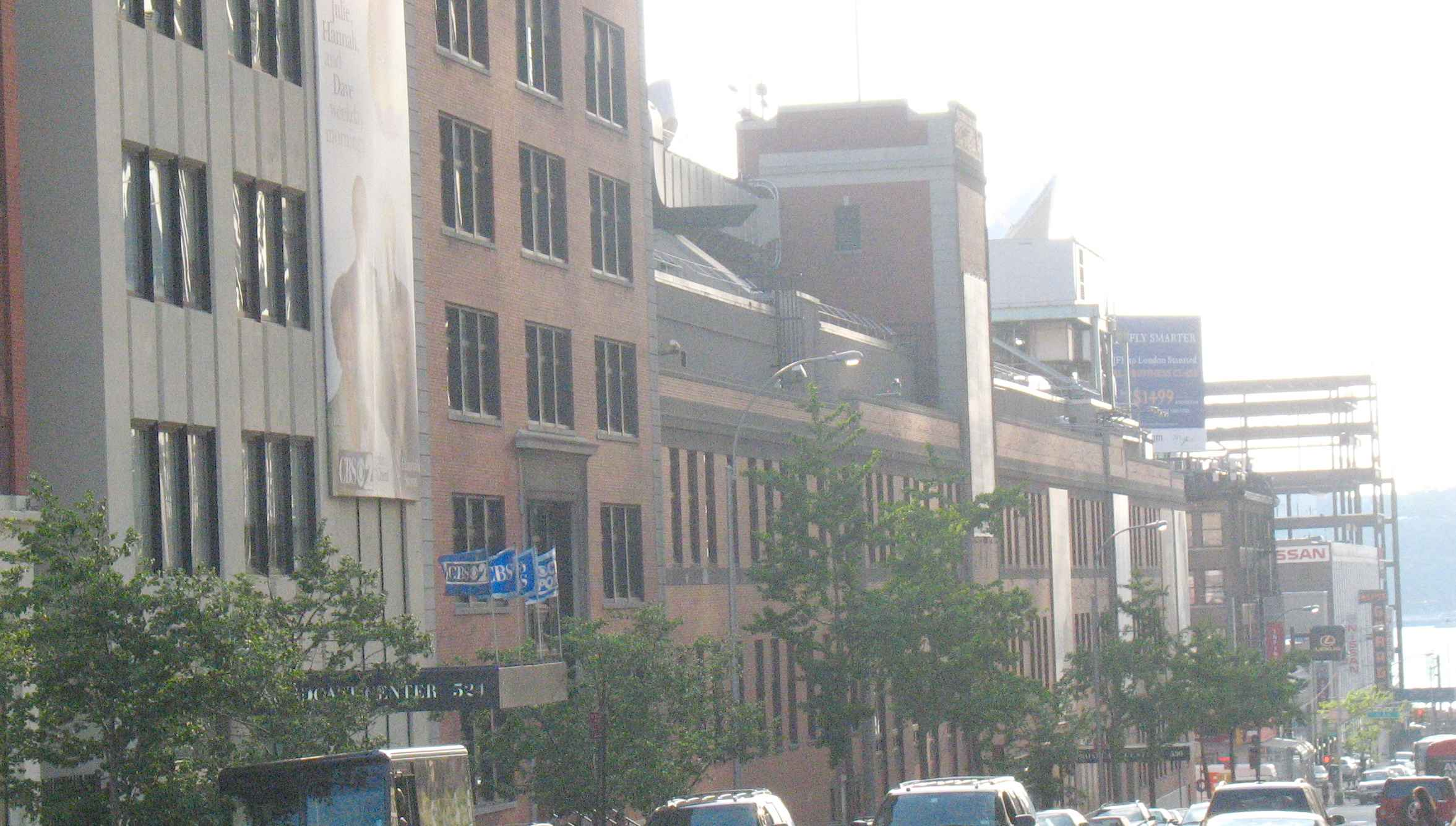
Another Sheffield facility on West 57th Street was converted into the CBS Broadcast Center.

In 1892, he installed the first pasteurizing machine in the United States, imported from Germany, at Sheffield Farms’ Bloomville, New York plant. The following year, pasteurization was demonstrated at the Columbian Exposition in Chicago. Commercial milk pasteurization was introduced in Baltimore in 1893, but Cincinnati is credited with the first large-scale pasteurization program in America. New York City followed in 1898, although pasteurization was not required for some years.

Slawson Brothers entered the milk distribution business in 1866. Loton H. Horton (April 22, 1852 – December 15, 1926), a Slawson on his mother’s side, began driving a milk wagon for his uncle when he was 16. He quickly rose to lead the company, becoming a partner at the age of 21 and principal owner in 1898. When the company merged with T. W. Decker and Sheffield Farms, he became the new firm’s president: a post he held until his death in 1926. At that time, Sheffield Farms Co. (the name was eventually shortened from Sheffield Farms–Slawson–Decker) was the largest dairy products company in the world, with nearly 2,000 retail routes and over 300 stores, mostly in New York City.

Just before his death, Horton had sold the company to the National Dairy Products Corporation. It was formed in 1923 as a merger of several dairy concerns and continued to grow through acquisitions, the most important of which was the addition of Sheffield Farms. Others included Breyers Ice Cream, also purchased in 1926, and Kraft-Phenix Cheese Corporation, in 1930. All of the companies continued to operate independently, marketing products under their recognized brand names. In 1969, National Dairy Products became Kraftco and then Kraft in 1976.

Horace S. Tuthill, Jr. retired in 1950 as a vice president of the Sheffield Farms Company in charge of sales and advertising, after thirty years with the company. Joseph A. Mulvihill and Michael J. Mulvihill worked for the company from the 1890's to 1950 in the New York City and Jamaica plants. There was also a store in Rockaway during the summer months.

Since 1964, the Sheffield buildings on West 57th Street between Tenth and Eleventh Avenues in Manhattan have been the CBS Broadcast Center.

The company built the Sheffield Farms Stable between 1903 and 1909. It was listed on the National Register of Historic Places in 2005.
