= Vladimir Ussachevsky =

Russian-American electronic music composer (1911–1990)

Vladimir Alexeevich Ussachevsky (November 3, 1911 in Hailar, China – January 2, 1990 in New York City) was a Russian-American composer, particularly known for his work in electronic music.

== Biography ==
Vladimir Ussachevsky was born in the Hailar District of China, in modern-day Inner Mongolia to an Imperial Russian Army officer assigned to protect Trans-Siberian Railway interests. He emigrated to the United States in 1930 and studied music at Pomona College in Claremont, California (B.A., 1935), as well as at the Eastman School of Music in Rochester, New York (M.M., 1936, Ph.D., 1939). Ussachevsky's early, neo-Romantic works were composed for traditional instruments, but in 1951 he began composing electronic music. He served as president of the American Composers Alliance from 1968 to 1970 and was an advisory member of the Composers Recordings, Inc. record label, which released recordings of a number of his compositions. Recordings of his music have also been released on the Capstone, d'Note, and New World labels.

== Teaching career ==
In 1947, following a stint with the U.S. Army Intelligence division in World War II, Ussachevsky joined the faculty of Columbia University, teaching there until his retirement in 1980. Together with Otto Luening, Ussachevsky co-founded the Columbia-Princeton Electronic Music Center in 1959. Ussachevsky specified the ADSR envelope in 1965, a basic component of modern synthesizers, samplers and electronic instruments. He also taught and was composer-in-residence at the University of Utah.

His students included Charles Wuorinen, Alice Shields, İlhan Mimaroğlu, Faye-Ellen Silverman, Charles L. Bestor, Ingram Marshall, Joan Tower, Michiko Toyama, Wendy Carlos, Kenjiro Ezaki, Pril Smiley, Charles Dodge, Ruth Anderson, and Richard Einhorn.

== Discography ==
"VLADIMIR USSACHEVSKY: ELECTRONIC AND ACOUSTIC WORKS 1957–1972". New York: New World Records (80654–2), 2007. This is a compilation rerelease of recordings originally issued on various CRI LP's in the 1960s and 1970s.

- Metamorphosis (1957)
- Linear Contrasts (1958)
- Poem in Cycles and Bells (1959)
- Wireless Fantasy (1960)
- Of Wood and Brass (1965)
- Computer Piece No. 1 (1968)
- Two Sketches for a Computer Piece (1971)
- Three Scenes from The Creation (1960; rev. 1973)
- Missa Brevis (1972)

"Vladimir Ussachevsky: Film Music". New York: New World Records (80389), 1990.

- Suite from No Exit (1962)
- Line of Apogee (1967)
