= String Quartet No. 3 (Babbitt) =

String Quartet No. 3 is the third of six chamber-music works in the string quartet medium by the American composer Milton Babbitt.

== History ==
Babbitt's Third Quartet was written in 1969–70 on commission by Mr. and Mrs. Lee A. Freeman for the Fine Arts Quartet, to whom it is dedicated. The world premiere performances were on May 4–5, 1970, by the Fine Arts Quartet, who subsequently recorded it under a subsidy from the Recording Publication Program of the Ford Foundation.

== Analysis ==
The Quartet is in a single movement lasting over 18 minutes. On first acquaintance the quartet may seem to consist of a welter of unrelated detail, with few if any short-term patterns. However, contrasting speeds and articulations (arco and pizzicato) gradually bring the shifting relationships of the details and the connected aspects of the larger sections into clear focus, and the composition begins to assume a shape of intricacy and beauty. It falls into four large sections, created by the pitch structure, each of which is divided into eight subsections. The subsections are set off by alternate arco and pizzicato playing, while the use of mutes also helps to underline the sectional structure: the first section is played by all of the instruments con sordini; in the second and third sections, subsections are defined by various combinations of muted and unmuted playing; and in the final section only the first violin plays con sordino. Unlike the Second and Fourth Quartets, the Third makes no further use of coloristic effects.

Although a single tempo is used throughout the entire work ( = ca. 72), subdivision of the basic unit into 2, 3, 4, 5, 6, 7, 8, and 12 subunits produces eight "subtempos", each of which defines a subsection of each rhythmic section. A time-point set analogous to the pitch-class set is projected in association with eight dynamic levels (from ppp to fff), each of which articulates a particular layer of the time-point structure throughout the composition.

== Discography ==
- The Contemporary Composer in the USA. Milton Babbitt: Quartet No. 3; Charles Wuorinen: String Quartet. Fine Arts Quartet (Leonard Sorkin and Abram Loft, violins; Bernard Zaslav, viola; George Sopkin, cello). LP recording, stereo, 12 in. Turnabout TV-S 34515. New York: Vox Productions, Inc., 1972. Reissued on CD, stereo. Music & Arts CD 707. Berkeley, California: Music & Arts, 1991.
