= String Quartet No. 6 (Babbitt) =

String Quartet No. 6 is the last of six chamber-music works in the string quartet medium by the American composer Milton Babbitt.

Babbitt's expansive and lyrical Sixth Quartet was written in 1993. It is in two sections, in each of which the work's underlying six-part all-partition array of fifty-eight aggregates is unfolded separately in each of the four instruments. There are only momentary breaks in each part, which otherwise play continuously throughout the work, giving the sense of an endless flow of music, saturated with florid detail. Changes in muting and playing technique, usually in one instrument at a time, are used to mark off composite pitch aggregates.

The work is based on an all-partition array which is (with a few swapped partitions) the M5 transform of the one used in The Joy of More Sextets (1986), for violin and piano.

== Recordings ==
- Milton Babbitt: Occasional Variations. Also with Babbitt: String Quartet No. 2; String Quartet No. 6; Composition for Guitar. RCA Mark II Sound Synthesizer, realized by Milton Babbitt; The Composers Quartet (Matthew Raimondi, Anahid Ajemian, violins; Jean Dupouy, viola; Michael Rudiakov, cello); Sherry Quartet (Harumi Rhodes, Aaron Boyd, violins; James Myer Hogg, viola; Katherine Cherbas, cello); William Anderson, guitar. CD recording. Tzadik TZ 7088. New York: Tzadik, 2008. Quartet No. 2 originally issued Nonesuch Records, 1973.
- Slowly Expanding Milton Babbitt Album: String Quartet no. 6 (1993). Performed by the Ars Combinatoria String Quartet: Erik Carlson, Norman Sifronsky, Christopher Otto, Michael Nicolas. Produced and edited by Erik Carlson. Recorded, mixed, and mastered by Andrew Munsey. Critical Listening by Ellie Moser, Matthew Barber, and Christopher Otto. https://midnightsledding.net/recordings/babbitt/EC_MB_SQ6.wav
