= Time point =

Moment in time in music

In music a time point or timepoint (point in time) is "an instant, analogous to a geometrical point in space". Because it has no duration, it literally cannot be heard, but it may be used to represent "the point of initiation of a single pitch, the repetition of a pitch, or a pitch simultaneity", therefore the beginning of a sound, rather than its duration. It may also designate the release of a note or the point within a note at which something changes (such as dynamic level). Other terms often used in music theory and analysis are attack point and starting point. Milton Babbitt calls the distance from one time point, attack, or starting point to the next a time-point interval, independent of the durations of the sounding notes which may be either shorter than the time-point interval (resulting in a silence before the next time point), or longer (resulting in overlapping notes). Charles Wuorinen shortens this expression to just time interval. Other writers use the terms attack interval, or (translating the German Einsatzabstand), interval of entry, interval of entrance, or starting interval.

== Interonset interval ==
Half-time drum pattern: the first and second measures have identical time-point, attack, or interonset intervals and will sound identical given certain instrumentation and performance practices.

Half time: the snare moves to beats 3 of measure one and two (beats 3 & 7) while the hi-hat plays only on the quarter notes. Also, the quarter notes 'sound like' eighth notes in one giant measure.

The corresponding term used in acoustics and audio engineering to describe the initiation of a sound is onset, and the interonset interval or IOI is the time between the beginnings or attack points of successive events or notes, the interval between onsets, not including the duration of the events. A variant of this term is interval of onset.

For example, two sixteenth notes separated by dotted eighth rest, would have the same interonset interval as between a quarter note and a sixteenth note:

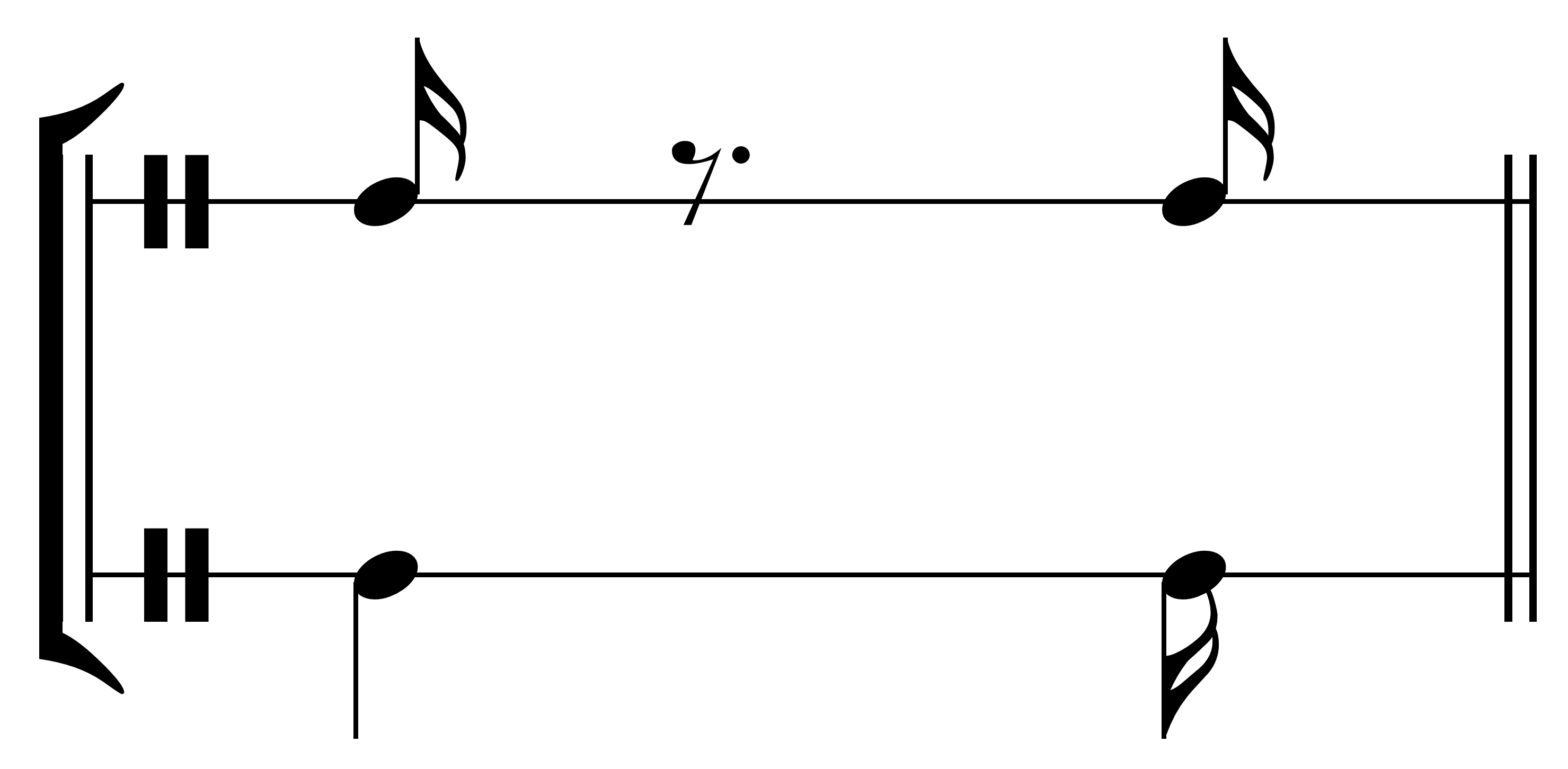

Snare

Piano

Clarinet

The concept is often useful for considering rhythms and meters.

== Time-point sets ==
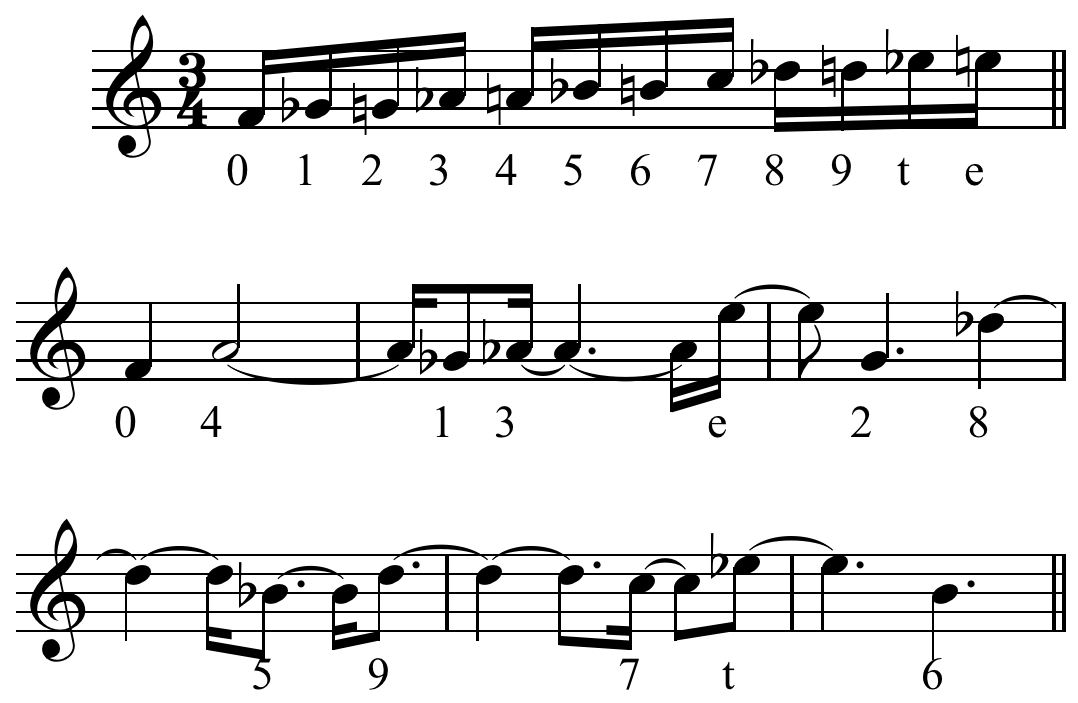
Division of the measure/chromatic scale, followed by pitch/time-point series

In serial music a time-point set, proposed in 1962 by Milton Babbitt, is a temporal order of pitches in a tone row which indicates the instants at which the notes start. This has certain advantages over a duration scale or row built from multiples of a unit, derived from Olivier Messiaen.

since duration is a measure of distance between time points, as interval is a measure of distance between pitch points, we begin by interpreting interval as duration. Then, pitch number is interpretable as the point of initiation of a temporal event, that is, as a time-point number.

— Milton Babbitt

For example, a measure may be divided into twelve metrical positions. In 3/4 this equals sixteenth notes. The start of each position, or time point, may then be labeled, in order, 0–11. Pitches may then be assigned locations within measures according to their pitch set number, now their pitch/time-set number. In Babbitt's first example he shows subsequent numbers which ascend (0–11) as within the same measure (if four follows three it may sound immediately), and subsequent numbers which descend as in the following measure (if three follows four it must necessarily wait for the next appearance of time-point three).

Babbitt uses time points in Partitions (1957), All Set (1957), and Post-Partitions (1966), as well as in Phonemena (1969–70), String Quartets No. 3 (1969–70) and No. 4 (1970), Arie da capo (1974), My Ends Are My Beginnings (1978), and Paraphrases (1979).

Charles Wuorinen has also developed an approach to the time-point system, which differs greatly from Babbitt's.

== Sources ==
Sources

- Babbitt, Milton (Fall 1962). "Twelve-Tone Rhythmic Structure and the Electronic Medium". Perspectives of New Music. 1 (1): 49–79. doi:10.2307/832179. JSTOR 832179.
- Kramer, Jonathan D. (1988). The Time of Music: New Meanings, New Temporalities, New Listening Strategies. New York; London: Schirmer; Collier Macmillan. ISBN 0-02-872590-5.
- Wuorinen, Charles (1979). Simple Composition. Longman Music Series. New York: Longman. ISBN 9780582280595.
