= Correspondences (Babbitt) =

1967 musical composition by Milton Babbitt

- by Milton Babbitt
- Genre: Orchestral
- Form: String Orchestra
- Recorded: 1994
- Duration: 10 Minutes

Premiere
- Date: 11 September 1968
- Location: Carnegie Hall, New York City
- Conductor: Lukas Foss
- Performers: Buffalo Philharmonic Orchestra

Correspondences is a 1967 musical composition by Milton Babbitt for string orchestra and synthesized tape. It was first performed at Carnegie Hall on 11 September 1968 by the Buffalo Philharmonic Orchestra with Lukas Foss conducting. It was recorded by the Chicago Symphony Orchestra, conducted by James Levine, in 1994 and released on a CD also featuring works by Elliott Carter, Gunther Schuller, and John Cage.

== Listening ==
- Correspondences on Slowly Expanding Milton Babbitt Album] (since 2018), produced by Erik Carlson
