= Ralph Evans (violinist) =

American violinist

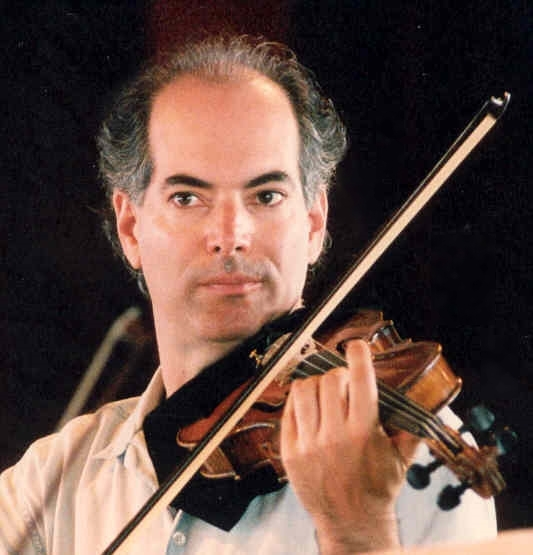
- Ralph Evans

Background information
- Born: 1953 (age 72–73); United States
- Genres: Classical, string quartet
- Occupation: Violinist
- Instrument: Violin
- Member of: Fine Arts Quartet

Ralph Evans (born 1953) is an American violinist, best known as first violinist of the Fine Arts Quartet.

The son of Jewish refugees from Russia and Germany, Evans began his musical studies at the age of five at the Vienna Academy of Music.

He graduated cum laude from Yale University, where he studied violin with Broadus Erle. He subsequently received a doctorate from Yale in 1980. As recipient of a Fulbright Scholar Award, he continued his studies in Europe with Szymon Goldberg and Nathan Milstein.

After winning the top prize in a number of major American competitions, including the 1978 Concert Artists Guild Competition in New York and the 1981 National Federation of Music Clubs National Young Artist Competition, he concertized as a soloist throughout North America and Europe.

In 1982, Evans won a prize in the International Tchaikovsky Competition in Moscow. He is briefly featured in a full-length documentary of this 1982 Competition. His performances at this Competition of the Tchaikovsky Violin Concerto and Violin Concerto No. 2 (Bartók) were filmed.

In late 1982, Evans succeeded Leonard Sorkin as first violinist of the Fine Arts Quartet, and he has toured widely with the Quartet ever since. He has recorded over 100 solo and chamber works.

Evans has also received recognition for his work as a composer. His award-winning composition "Nocturne" was performed on American Public Television and a recording of his "String Quartet No. 1" was released by Naxos in 2008.

Since 2017, he has been Professor of Violin and Chamber Music at The New School's Mannes School of Music in New York.

== Discography ==
- Ralph Evans Discography
