= String Quartet No. 2 (Babbitt) =

String Quartet No. 2 (1954) is the second of six string quartets by the American composer Milton Babbitt.

== Analysis ==
The form of this chamber composition evolves from and expounds features of a basic twelve-tone series.

Babbitt makes his processes as intelligible as possible and leads his listener from one step to the next after all the possibilities have been investigated. The result is an exhilarating piece, self-contained and exact. And the beauty is not purely formal: there are many incidental pleasures in the springing deployment of string effects, as well as elegant changes of gear at the junctions between the four principal sections.)

The pitch material is developed gradually in the opening bars. An interval of a rising minor third predominates in bars 1–3, followed by a concentration on falling major thirds in bars 4–6. The following bars continue in this way, presenting a single interval or pair of intervals, beneath which groupings defined by dynamics and register develop patterns suggested by these intervals, eventually involving all aspects of the musical structure. The quartet alternates such sections of intervallic exposition with sections that develop the intervals presented up to that point, until eleven different ordered pitch-class intervals have been presented and developed until, in a moment referred to by Babbitt as "telling you the butler did it", the set that controls the entire musical structure is revealed by a process of "disambiguation", as Babbitt himself described it.

== Discography ==
- Ruth Crawford Seeger: String Quartet (1931); George Perle: String Quartet No. 5 (1960/67); Milton Babbitt: String Quartet No. 2 (1952 [sic, recte: 1954]). The Composers Quartet (Matthew Raimondi, Anahid Ajemian, violins; Jean Dupouy, viola; Michael Rudiakov, cello). LP recording, 12 inch, stereo. Nonesuch Records H-71280. New York: Nonesuch, 1973. Babbitt Quartet No. 2 reissued on CD as part of Milton Babbitt: Occasional Variations. Also with Babbitt: String Quartet No. 6; Composition for Guitar. Mark II Sound Synthesizer, realized by Milton Babbitt; The Composers Quartet (Matthew Raimondi, Anahid Ajemian, violins; Jean Dupouy, viola; Michael Rudiakov, cello); Fred Sherry String Quartet (Harumi Rhodes, Aaron Boyd, violins; James Myer Hogg, viola; Katherine Cherbas, cello); William Anderson, guitar. CD recording. Tzadik TZ 7088. New York: Tzadik, 2008.
- Richard Boulanger: Three Chapters from The Book of Dreams; Stephen Travis Pope: Bat out of Hell; Milton Babbitt: String Quartet No. 2 (selections); Stuart Dempster and William O. Smith: Outrage and Eye Music; Larry Solomon: The End of September and Casio Improvisation No. 1. János Négyesy (Mathews violin) and Lee Ray, electronics; Queen String Quartet; Stuart Dempster (trombone) and William O. Smith (clarinet). Cassette tape recording, stereo, accompanying Perspectives of New Music 24, no. 2. [Seattle] 1986.

== Listening ==
- Quartet No. 2 on Slowly Expanding Milton Babbitt Album] (since 2018), produced by Erik Carlson
