= Columbia–Princeton Electronic Music Center (album) =

Columbia-Princeton Electronic Music Center

Live album by various artists
- Released: 1964
- Recorded: May 9 and 10, 1961
- Genre: Classical music, Electronic music
- Length: 49:44
- Label: Columbia Masterworks

Columbia-Princeton Electronic Music Center was an album of electronic music released in 1964. It was the recording of a concert performed at the McMillin Theater (later renamed the Miller Theater) at Columbia University on May 9 and 10, 1961. The stereo version was MS 6566 and the monophonic version was ML 5966. There was a sequel released in 1998 on the New World label titled Columbia-Princeton Electronic Music Center 1961–1973. Bülent Arel is the only artist who appears on both albums.

The Arel composition is completely electronic, with articulated signals over a continuous background texture. Halim El-Dabh's composition, an "electronic drama," has a text drawn from the epic of Layla and Majnun, and consists primarily of tape manipulated instrumental and vocal sounds. Ussachevsky's work has lyrics derived from the Enuma Elish creation myth, with chorus and electronic accompaniment. Babbitt's piece is composed entirely on the RCA Synthesizer of the Columbia-Princeton Computer Music Center. Davidovsky created a work manipulating sine wave, square wave, and white noise generators. Luening's composition combines solo violin with RCA Synthesizer sound followed by tape manipulation.

== Track listing ==
=== Side one ===
1. Bülent Arel: Stereo Electronic Music No. 1 – 10:28
2. Halim El-Dabh: Leiyla and the Poet – 5:20
3. Vladimir Ussachevsky: Creation—Prologue – 8:09

=== Side two ===
1. Milton Babbitt: Composition for Synthesizer – 10:36
2. Mario Davidovsky: Electronic Study No. 1 – 5:50
3. Otto Luening: Gargoyles – 9:21
