= Hala (given name) =

Hala (Arabic: هالة) is an Arabic female given name meaning "the aura of light around the moon".

Notable people with the name include:

- Hala Finley (born 2009), American actress
- Hala Sakakini (1924-2002), Palestinian writer
