= Bethany Beardslee =

American operatic soprano (born 1925)

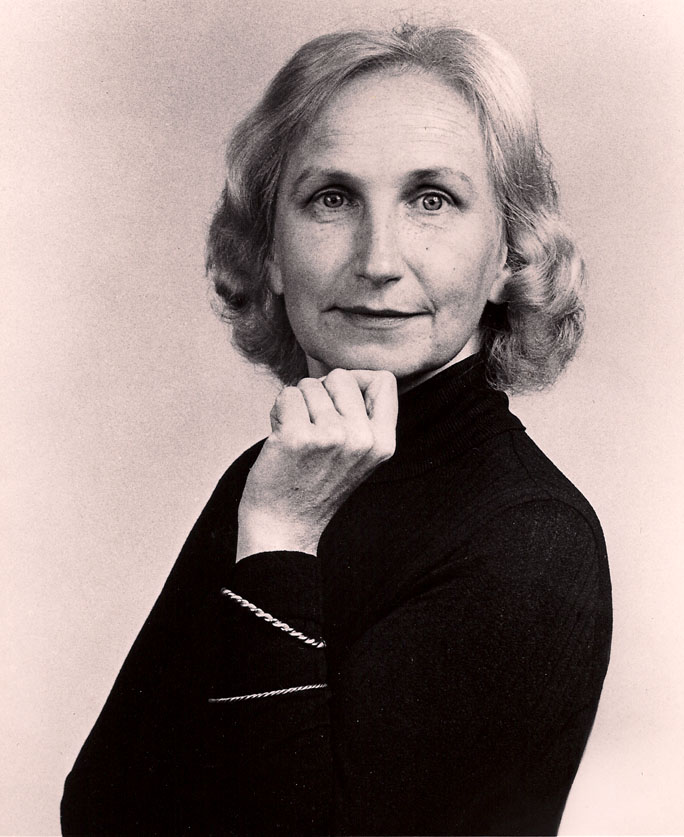
Bethany Beardslee, 1978

Bethany Beardslee (born December 25, 1925) is an American soprano. She is particularly noted for her collaborations with major 20th-century composers, such as Igor Stravinsky, Milton Babbitt, Pierre Boulez, George Perle, Sir Peter Maxwell Davies and her performances of great contemporary classical music by Arnold Schoenberg, Alban Berg, Anton Webern. Her legacy amongst mid-century composers was as a "composer's singer"—for her commitment to the highest art of new music. Milton Babbitt said of her "She manages to learn music no one else in the world can. She can work, work, work." In a 1961 interview for Newsweek, Beardslee flaunted her unflinching repertoire and disdain for commercialism: "I don't think in terms of the public... Music is for the musicians. If the public wants to come along and study it, fine. I don't go and try to tell a scientist his business because I don't know anything about it. Music is just the same way. Music is not entertainment."

== Life ==
Beardslee was born in Lansing, Michigan. She trained first in the Music Department of Michigan State College (now Michigan State University), where she received her B.M. (cum laude), and later did post-graduate work at the Juilliard School. She trained with Louise Zemlinsky (wife of Alexander Zemlinsky) She received an honorary doctorate from Princeton University in 1977, an honorary Ph.D. from the New School of Music in Philadelphia, PA in 1984, and from the New England Conservatory in 1994.

Her first husband, the French conductor Jacques-Louis Monod, whom she married in 1951, introduced her to the basic vocal repertoire of the Second Viennese School. Together they toured the United States through the 1950s and gave recitals of this literature combined with basic Lieder. Monod's influence brought Beardslee onto the path that would become her career in contemporary classical music.

In 1956, she married the composer Godfrey Winham, a pioneer in the research of computer music of the period. They have two children, Baird and Christopher Winham. Godfrey Winham died in 1975.

She retired officially in 1984, though she performed a number of times in the decade that followed. Her final public performance was 1993 at the Weill Recital Hall in New York City. About that performance, Alex Ross wrote in The New York Times that "the legendary soprano Bethany Beardslee-Winham, now well into her sixties, remains a compelling interpreter of new music."

In retirement, she was president of APNM (Association for the Publication of New Music) and produced a number of CDs of her own performances, as well as the compositions of her late husband Godfrey Winham, and her friend Arlene Zallman.

She has lived for the past thirteen years (as of when, the latest source is 2007) in a historic Georgian mansion, Maizeland, in the Hudson Valley, near her family.

== Career highlights ==
Her virtuosity is displayed in many recordings of music of the Second Viennese School as well as works written for her, notably Milton Babbitt's Philomel. During the 1950s, she performed world premieres and made historic recordings of music of the Second Viennese School.

Beardslee started working closely with Milton Babbitt in 1949. Babbitt was one of Beardslee's longest and most important musical collaborations. He composed a number of pieces for Beardslee's sharp crystal soprano and dramatic wit, including: Du a Song Cycle for soprano and piano on the poetry of August Stramm, "Vision and Prayer: poetry by Dylan Thomas," Philomel text by John Hollander, "A Solo Requiem" in honor of her late husband, Godfrey Winham.

In 1962 she was given the American Composers Alliance Laurel Leaf Award for "distinguished achievement in fostering and encouraging American music." The Ford Foundation Award in 1964 gave Beardslee the possibility to commission Milton Babbitt to write "Philomel".

Beardslee's recording with Robert Craft of Schoenberg's "Pierrot Lunaire" (Columbia Records, 1961) was a milestone in 20th-century music. It was the first recording of the piece that used the sprechstimme in the way that Schoenberg had conceived the piece. Craft, who conducted it, said to Beardslee that "your performance is the first that anyone can listen to beginning to end with total pleasure and belief in the sprechstimme medium. You have made a permanent document." It was also the recording used by Glen Tetley when he choreographed Pierrot Lunaire. In 1977–78, Rudolf Nureyev, dancing Tetley's choreography to Beardslee's live performances, appeared together in New York, Los Angeles, and Paris. Beardslee went on to perform "Pierrot" over fifty times in the US and abroad.

=== Performances ===
In 1961, Beardslee sang for Martha Graham's premiere of Clytemnestra. She premiered new works by Babbitt, Schoenberg, Stravinsky, Krenek, Webern, Dallapiccola, Berg. Her first performance of Pierrot Lunaire was in New York at Town Hall with Jacques-Louis Monod conducting, for Camera Concerts in November 1955.

Beardslee performed with the following major orchestras:

Boston Symphony Orchestra (conductors: Charles Munch, Erich Leinsdorf, Michael Tilson Thomas, Gunther Schuller)
New York Philharmonic (conductor: Pierre Boulez)
Denver Symphony Orchestra (conductor: Brian Priestman)
Minneapolis Symphony (conductor: Stanislaw Skrowacewski)
Detroit Symphony (conductor: Paul Paray)
Buffalo Philharmonic (conductor: Lukas Foss)
St. Louis Symphony (conductor: Eleazar Carvalho)
Columbia Symphony, premiere of "Threni" (conductor: Igor Stravinsky)

These Quartets:

New Music, Budapest, LaSalle, Pro Arte, Sequoia, Composers String Quartet, Emerson Quartet, Atlantic String Quartet, Vermeer Quartet

Lieder Recitals with:

Robert Helps, Pianist, Composer
Jacques-Louis Monod, Pianist, Composer, Conductor
Yehudi Wyner, Pianist, Composer
Richard Goode, Pianist

=== Discography ===
1949 – Concert Aria After Solomon, Op. 29, Ben Weber. Frank Brieff, conductor. American Recording Society.
Seven Orchestral Songs, Alban Berg. Robert Craft, conductor. Columbia Records
"Der Wein", Alban Berg. Robert Craft, conductor. Columbia Records
1961 – Pierrot Lunaire, Arnold Schoenberg. Robert Craft, conductor. Columbia Records
Altenberg Lieder, Alban Berg. Robert Craft, conductor. Columbia Records
Threni, Igor Stravinsky. Stravinsky, conductor. Columbia Records
Sestina, Ernst Krenek. Epic Records
Emily Dickinson Songs, George Perle. C.R.I.
Songs from Walt Whitman, Malcolm Peyton. C.R.I.
Mother Goose Primer, Philip Batstone. C.R.I.
Incantations, Ralph Shapey. C.R.I.
Improvisation, James K. Randall. C.R.I.
Unquiet Heart, Alden Ashforth. C.R.I.
Gossamer Noons, Robert Helps. C.R.I.
Gossamer Noons for Soprano & Orchestra, Gunther Schuller. C.R.I.
Vision and Prayer, Milton Babbitt. 10th Anniversary Electronic Album: Columbia-Princeton Electronic Music Center
English Madrigals. New York Pro Musica. Decca
Medieval Music from the Court of Spain. New York Pro Musica. Decca
Concert Aria after Solomon, Ben Weber. Desto
1966 – An 18th Century Vocal Recital (Arias of Pergolesi and Haydn Cantata, Miseri noi), Musica Viva Orchestra. Jim Bolle, Conductor. Monitor
Philomel, Milton Babbitt. New World. 1971 (selected for the National Recordings Registry in Washington DC)
Recital: "Yesterday is Not Today" American Art Songs with Donald Gramm. New World
Second String Quartet, Schoenberg. Sequoia Quartet. Nonesuch
Little Companion Pieces, Mel Powell. Sequoia Quartet. Nonesuch
A Solo Requiem, Milton Babbitt. Nonesuch.
Haiku Songs, Mel Powell. Nonesuch
Book of the Hanging Gardens, Schoenberg. Robert Helps. Son Nova
1961 – Music of Mel Powell and Milton Babbitt. Robert Helps, pianist. Son Nova
2018 - Bethany Beardslee Sings Schumann, Schubert and Brahms

Beardslee can also be seen and heard singing excerpts from Pierrot Lunaire on Episode 1 of Aaron Copland's WNET series, Music in the Twenties.
