= Edwin Borchard =

American legal scholar (1884–1951)

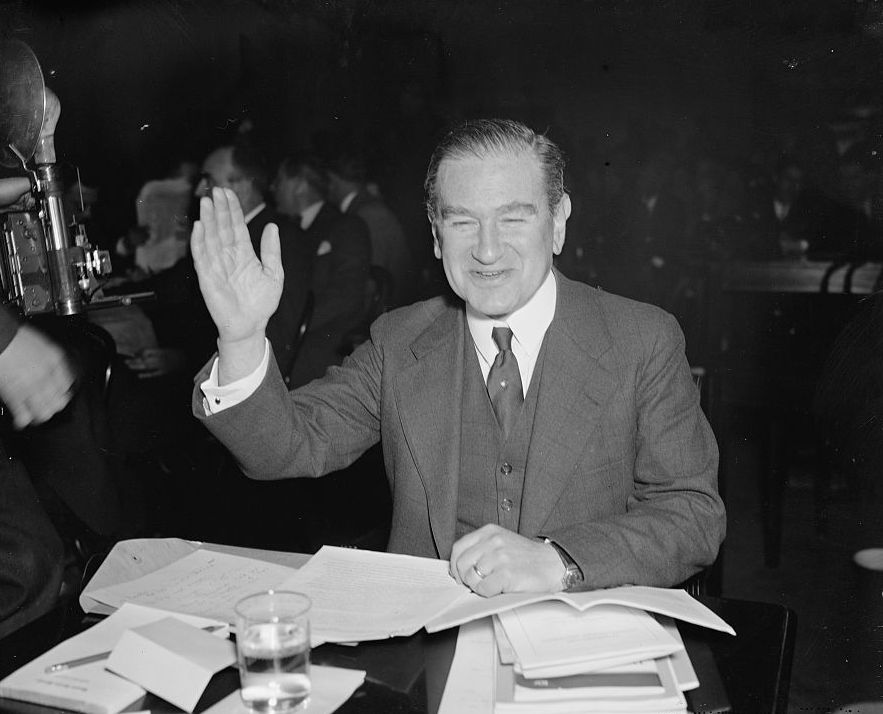
- Borchard at the Senate Judiciary Committee, 1937
- Born: Edwin Montefiore Borchard; October 17, 1884; New York, New York, U.S.
- Died: July 22, 1951 (aged 66); Hamden, Connecticut, U.S.

Academic background
- Education: College of the City of New York; New York Law School (LLB); Columbia University (BA, PhD)
- Thesis: The Diplomatic Protection of Citizens Abroad, or The Law of International Claims

Academic work
- Institutions: Law Library of Congress; Yale University
- Main interests: International law
- Notable works: Convicting the Innocent; Declaratory Judgments
- Notable ideas: Wrongful conviction compensation; declaratory judgments

Edwin Montefiore Borchard (October 17, 1884 – July 22, 1951) was an American international legal scholar, jurist, and Sterling Professor at the Yale Law School. He was a leading advocate of innocence reform and compensation for victims of wrongful conviction as well as the use of declaratory judgments. His work in international law emphasized non-intervention and neutrality.

== Education ==
Borchard was born in 1884 in New York City to Michaelis Borchard, an import-export businessman, and Malwina Schachne. He attended the College of the City of New York from 1898 to 1902. He graduated with an LL.B. from New York Law School in 1905, a B.A. from Columbia University in 1908, and a PhD, from Columbia in 1913, writing a thesis entitled The Diplomatic Protection of Citizens Abroad.

== Career ==
Borchard served as the Law Librarian in the Law Library of Congress from 1911 to 1916. After a year working as an attorney for the National City Bank of New York, he accepted a position at the Yale Law School in 1917, where he was eventually appointed Sterling Professor of International Law and remained until his death. He highlighted cases of wrongly convicted people in the US and advocated for their right to compensation in Convicting the Innocent. His work led to the passage of a federal law compensating victims of wrongful conviction in federal courts. He later served as a representative of the American Civil Liberties Union (ACLU) during the 1944 Korematsu v. United States Supreme Court case.

Borchard's scholarship and public advocacy was very influential in stimulating the adoption of the declaratory judgment procedure in American courts in the 1920s and 1930s, a subject on which he also wrote a book, Declaratory Judgments.

Borchard's other interests included music. He was first violinist in the New Haven Symphony Orchestra and president of the Orchestra Association.

== Family ==
Borchard and his wife Corinne had two daughters, Carol Borchard Sopkin (married to George Sopkin, professor of music at the University of Wisconsin–Milwaukee and cellist of the Fine Arts Quartet) and Alice Borchard Couch.

== Bibliography ==
=== Dissertation ===
- Borchard, Edwin. (1915). The Diplomatic Protection of Citizens Abroad, or The Law of International Claims

=== Books ===
- ——. (1923). The Permanent Court of International Justice
- ——. (1932). Convicting the Innocent: Sixty-Five Actual Errors of Criminal Justice
- ——; Lage, William Potter. (1937). Neutrality for the United States
- ——. (1941). Declaratory Judgments
- ——. (1946). American Foreign Policy
- ——; Wynne, William H. (1951). State Insolvency and Foreign Bondholders

=== Papers ===
- ——. (1913). European Systems Of State Indemnity For Errors of Criminal Justice

=== Reference works ===
- ——. (1912). Guide to the Law and Legal Literature of Germany. U.S. Government Printing Office
- ——. (1913). The Bibliography of International Law and Continental Law. Government Printing Office
- ——. (1917). Guide to the Law and Legal Literature of Argentina, Brazil and Chile. Government Printing Office
