= String Quartet No. 5 =

String Quartet No. 5 may refer to:

- String Quartet No. 5 (Babbitt) by Milton Babbitt
- String Quartet No. 5 (Bartók) by Béla Bartók
- String Quartet No. 5 (Beethoven) by Ludwig van Beethoven
- String Quartet No. 5 (Carter) by Elliott Carter
- String Quartet No. 5 (Diamond) by David Diamond
- String Quartet No. 5 (Dvořák) by Antonín Dvořák
- String Quartet No. 5 (Ferneyhough) by Brian Ferneyhough
- String Quartet No. 5 (Halffter) by Cristóbal Halffter
- String Quartet No. 5 (Hill) by Alfred Hill
- String Quartet No. 5 (McCabe) by John McCabe
- String Quartet No. 5 (Maconchy) by Elizabeth Maconchy
- String Quartet No. 5 (Mendelssohn) by Felix Mendelssohn
- String Quartet No. 5 (Milhaud), Op. 64, by Darius Milhaud
- String Quartet No. 5 (Mozart) by Wolfgang Amadeus Mozart
- String Quartet No. 5 (Piston) by Walter Piston
- String Quartet No. 5 (Porter) by Quincy Porter
- String Quartet No. 5 (Rihm) by Wolfgang Rihm
- String Quartet No. 5 (Schubert) by Franz Schubert
- String Quartet No. 5 (Shostakovich) by Dmitri Shostakovich
- String Quartet No. 5 (Tippett) by Michael Tippett
- String Quartet No. 5 (Villa-Lobos) by Heitor Villa-Lobos
