= Sakakini =

Sakakini may refer to:

- El Sakkakini, area of Cairo

== People with the surname ==
- Khalil Sakakini (1878-1953), Palestinian teacher, scholar, poet, and Arab nationalist
- Hala Sakakini (1924-2002), Palestinian writer
