= String Quartet No. 5 (Babbitt) =

String Quartet No. 5 is the fifth of six chamber music works in the string quartet medium by the American composer Milton Babbitt.

== History ==
Babbitt's Fifth Quartet was written in 1982 and is dedicated to the Sequoia Quartet, who first performed it on 24 October 1982.

== Analysis ==
It is composed using superarrays, which can also be described as an array of arrays: multiple arrays unfolding simultaneously in counterpoint against each other. The use of superarrays extends and enriches the compositional possibilities of twelve-tone technique. The basic array of the Quartet is the same as the one used in My Complements to Roger, transformations of which are also found in My Ends are My Beginnings for solo clarinet.

== Recordings ==
- Three Contemporary American String Quartets. Mel Powell: String Quartet 1982; Elliott Carter: Quartet No. 4 (1984); Milton Babbitt: Quartet No. 5 (1982). The Composers Quartet. CD recording. Music & Arts CD-606. Berkeley: Music and Arts Program of America, 1990.
