= Godfrey Winham =

English-born music theorist and composer

Godfrey Winham (11 December 1934 – 26 April 1975) was an English-born music theorist and composer of contemporary classical music who moved to the United States.

While in the UK, Winham studied with Hans Keller, and contributed brief reviews and structural summaries of new works to The Music Review.

In 1956 he married the singer and contemporary music specialist Bethany Beardslee. He received his B.A. (1956), M.F.A. (1958), and Ph.D. (1965) all at Princeton University and remained there after his graduation as a lecturer and research associate in the field of computer-generated electronic sound. During the 1960s he was an influential figure in American music theory circles, even though his list of publications was not extensive. His large collection of mostly unpublished documents and papers is held at Princeton University.

== Music by Godfrey Winham ==
- Scherzo (for piano solo), Op. 3, 1953.
- Composition for Orchestra, 1963.
- Sonata for Orchestra (unfinished), 1975.

== Writings by Godfrey Winham ==
- "Composition with Arrays": Perspectives of New Music 9, no. 1 (Fall-Winter): 43–67.

== Writings about Godfrey Winham ==
- Leslie David Blasius: The Music Theory of Godfrey Winham, Princeton University Press, 1997.
