= Philomel (Babbitt) =

1964 serial composition by Milton Babbitt

Philomel, a serial composition written in 1964, combines synthesizer with both live and recorded soprano voice. It is Milton Babbitt's best-known work. Planned for performance at the Metropolitan Museum of Art, it was funded by the Ford Foundation and commissioned for soprano Bethany Beardslee. Babbitt created it in the Columbia-Princeton Electronic Music Center, New York, of which he was a founding member.

== Synopsis ==
The three sections of the piece are based on Ovid's myth of Philomela, a maiden raped by King Tereus who then cut out her tongue, and her transformation into a nightingale. In the second section, John Hollander, the librettist, has Philomel communicate with some of the inhabitants of the woods in echo verse. In fact, Hollander had written a book on echo poetry, so the section is written not in straight echo but in very elaborate and intricate poetry. The third section is a series of five arias where Philomel finally regains her voice and sings about her life.

== Methods of composition ==
The piece, an example of combined live performance with tape, was one of the first compositions on the synthesizer and shows Babbitt's use of the human voice.

John Hollander, a poet at Yale University, wrote the libretto for Babbitt under specific conditions – it would be for solo soprano and would be performed with at least four sets of speakers around the performance hall. Essentially, Babbitt would record the soprano's voice and edit it through a synthesizer.

To produce the piece, Babbitt had to create the sounds from the synthesizer. Then he had to tape the soprano voice in sections; however, for a large portion of the time, she sang straight but answered herself as she was recorded. The vocal part was fairly straightforward since the soprano was producing the part within the confines of the human voice, but Babbitt wrote for Beardslee in a way that he could not have written otherwise because so much of it depended on what was happening electronically. Philomel was written, as most of Babbitt's music was, on four tracks, with the set-up for the recording at Columbia's Macmillan Theatre. The piece could not have been attempted with live performers.

According to Babbitt himself, "I could produce things faster than any pianist could play or any listener could hear. We were able to work with greater speeds. That was one of the things that interested me the most – the timbre, the rhythmic aspect. And we learned a great deal. It was an analog device and it was given digital information and switching instructions...passing over very expensive gold wires that scanned the information and then recorded it on tape. I could change certain qualities of a tone while keeping other qualities, like the pitch, consistent."

Babbitt and Hollander devised new ways of combining musical and verbal expression, such as: music is as articulate as language, and language (Philomel's thoughts) is transformed into music (the nightingale's song). The work is an almost endless range of similarities and differences between speech and song and uses word-music puns which were not achievable without the use of the synthesizer.

The composition is "a re-interpretation of a scena drammatica with its distinct recitative–arioso–aria layout".
