= Who Cares if You Listen? =

1958 article by Milton Babbitt

"Who Cares if You Listen?" is an article written by the American composer Milton Babbitt (1916–2011) and published in the February 1958 issue of High Fidelity. Originally titled by Babbitt as "The Composer as Specialist", the article was subsequently retitled by the magazine's editors against his wishes. It is among the best known of Babbit's works and epitomized the distance that had grown between many composers and their listeners. In the words of Anthony Tommasini in The New York Times, "To this day, it is seized as evidence that he and his ilk are contemptuous of audiences."

Babbitt was a practitioner of integral serialism, which in his hands could be a highly technical mode of musical composition. The article does not refer to serialism at all, but rather takes the position that "serious", "advanced" music, like advanced mathematics, philosophy, and physics, is too complex for a "normally well-educated man without special preparation" to "understand".

== The article ==
In this article and throughout his writings, Babbitt's subject is "American culture, which he finds threatened by populism. It has produced little meaningful understanding of or dialogue about music, he argues, and it has forced the 'serious' and 'advanced' composer into a state of isolation".

Babbitt describes "serious", "advanced music" as "a commodity which has little, no, or negative commodity value", and the composer of such music as, "in essence, a 'vanity' composer". It is music of which the general public is largely unaware, and in which it takes no interest. "After all, the public does have its own music, its ubiquitous music: music to eat by, to read by, to dance by..." Performers, too, are seldom interested in "advanced" music, so that it is rarely performed at all and the exceptional occasions are mainly "poorly attended concerts before an audience consisting in the main of fellow 'professionals'. At best, the music would appear to be for, of, and by specialists". Babbitt continues to maintain, however, that music cannot "evolve" if it only attempts to appeal to "the public". "And so, I dare suggest that the composer would do himself and his music an immediate and eventual service by total, resolute, and voluntary withdrawal from this public world to one of private performance and electronic media, with its very real possibility of complete elimination of the public and social aspects of musical composition." He recognizes the practical problems for the composer of "advanced" music not patronized by the concert-going public: "But how, it may be asked, will this serve to secure the means of survival for the composer and his music? One answer is that after all such a private life is what the university provides the scholar and the scientist." He concludes: "if this [advanced] music is not supported, the whistling repertory of the man in the street will be little affected... But music will cease to evolve, and, in that important sense, will cease to live."

== Controversy over title ==
In an interview with Gabrielle Zuckerman for "American Mavericks" on American Public Media in 2002, Babbitt admits that the "story" of "Who Cares if You Listen" had "pursued" and "angered" him. He goes on to state that the article was originally a lecture entitled "Off the Cuff", and that the title "Who Cares if You Listen" was not authorized by him. In fact, some years earlier, he stated that the title he sent to High Fidelity was "The Composer as Specialist", notwithstanding the article's opening line. However, "the article was injudiciously cut and given its inflammatory title by an editor". In the interview, Babbitt suggests that the published title "had little of the letter and nothing of the spirit of the article", and protests, "Of course, I do care if you listen." Yet, Babbitt's suggestion in the article for the composer of "advanced music" is "total, resolute, and voluntary withdrawal from this public world to one of private performance".

Tommasini was not the only one to have pointed out that Babbitt's protests about the title "may sound like revisionist spin control". Whether the article's contents were reflected in the title is a matter of controversy. On the one hand, one commentator stated that "Mr. Babbitt will go to his grave famous for, among other things, a piece of prose whose published title—Who Cares If You Listen?—he insists was appended by an unfeeling editor. Yet the title accurately echoes the essay's ideas..." On the other, it has been written that "Although the essay does not actually express the sentiment of its false title, one could, on a cursory reading, perhaps, get that out of it."

== Historical reception ==
According to Michael Beckerman, writing in The New York Times in 1994, "Milton Babbitt combined the evolutionary imperative with genuine contempt for his audience in his infamous article, 'Who Cares if You Listen'... These tactics contrast with those of composers like Janáček, Bartók, and Debussy, who never advocated antagonistic battles or felt that alternative visions needed to be suppressed in the name of progress."

In 1997, K. Robert Schwarz equated serialism with the "advanced" music Babbitt described in his article, and added, "By the 1960s, the Serialists commanded intellectual prestige and held influential academic posts. All they lacked was a public. In fact, mainstream audiences disliked their work, preferring the music of traditionalists who retained links with tonality: Copland, Barber, Prokofiev, Shostakovich and Britten. In academic circles, those composers were sneered at, viewed as expendable fossils from a bygone age." Nine years later, Walter Simmons echoed Schwarz's belief, and named in addition to Barber et al., Nicolas Flagello, Ernest Bloch, Howard Hanson, Paul Creston, and Vittorio Giannini as victims of "a de facto blacklisting of composers who failed to conform to the approved [i.e., pro-modernist] version of music history", and cites Babbit's article as epitomizing "the contemptuous attitude of Modernist composers". In a review of Simmons's book, however, David Nicholls disagreed, referring to Simmons's contention as a "conspiracy theory" and attributing the disregard of the composers he cites to their "artistic limitations". Another interpretation was proposed by Joseph N. Straus. Straus conducted a research study that considered six questions about American compositional activity from the 1950s and 1960s: (1) who controlled the academy? (2) whose music got published? (3) whose music got performed? (4) whose music got recorded? (5) who got the prizes, awards, and fellowships? (6) whose music got reviewed? From this evidence the author concluded, "As the period drew to a close, the American academy was dominated, as it had been throughout the 1950s and 1960s, by tonally oriented composers."

Finally, the article gives a glimpse into how Babbitt viewed the future of music in 1958: "The unprecedented divergence between contemporary serious music and its listeners, on the one hand, and traditional music and its following, on the other, is not accidental and—most probably—not transitory." In this prediction, he was perfectly accurate. "In fact it considers the problems for the survival of music that are posed by the discrepancy between the music that results from the composer's life-long, professional's engagement with music and its advances, on the one hand, and the interests of the lay public on the other, a situation which was troubling then and has not become any less troubling over the years." "In this regard, 'The Composer as Specialist' appears more relevant than ever, given that the drive towards the economic justification of university disciplines has, in Europe at least, reached a critical stage."
