= George Sopkin =

George Sopkin (April 3, 1914 – October 28, 2008) was an American cellist who was a founding member of the Fine Arts Quartet and faculty member at Kneisel Hall School of Chamber Music in Blue Hill, Maine.

Born and raised in Chicago, Sopkin was about twelve years old when he first played the cello. By age eighteen, six years later, he was auditioning for the Chicago Symphony Orchestra. Frederick Stock looked at Sopkin and said, "So we're taking Boy Scouts now?". Stock gave him the job, making him one of the youngest performers with the orchestra. He earned $65 per week for the symphony's 28-week season, plus a seven-week summer session, a respectable income for the Great Depression, especially for a teenager. Sopkin spent eight years with the Chicago Symphony Orchestra.

He left in symphony in 1941 to form the Fine Arts Quartet together with violinist Leonard Sorkin, who had also performed with the Chicago Symphony. Sopkin served together with other musicians in the United States Army Air Forces during World War II in Orlando, Florida. Sopkin and other musicians made records of their performances that were sold at the PX.

After returning from military service, the Fine Arts Quartet was revived, operating in Chicago under the auspices of the American Broadcasting Company. The members of the quartet joined the music faculty of the University of Wisconsin–Milwaukee in 1964, and the quartet relocated there.

Sopkin left the Fine Arts Quartet in 1979 following a hand injury and a detached retina, but continued to make occasional guest appearances with the group. Violinist Abram Loft, who played with the quartet from 1954 until 1979, noted that they had made 60 records and played in 270 cities in 28 countries during the 25 years they spent together in the quartet.

After retiring and moving to Maine, Sopkin became involved with the annual school and chamber music festival at Kneisel Hall, joining the school's staff in 1995. He advocated for the addition of sessions for adult and amateur musicians. He pushed for the creation of the annual House concerts, which have provided a major source of additional revenue for the school. Sopkin's efforts led to bringing students to Maine early so that they could perform in area schools before the summer programs began.

Sopkin was married to Carol Borchard Sopkin, also a cellist and the daughter of Edwin Borchard and Corinne Borchard.

Sopkin died at age 94 on October 28, 2008, at his home in Surry, Maine.
