= Anahid Ajemian =

American violinist (1924–2016)

Anahid Marguerite Ajemian
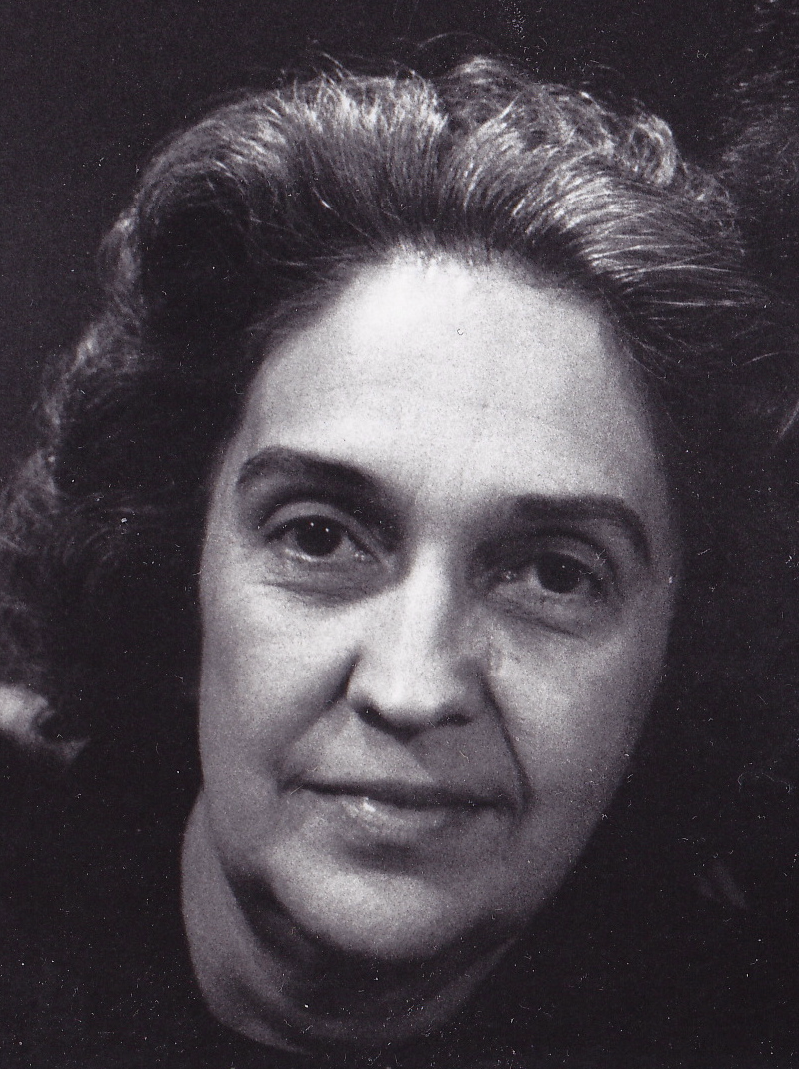
- Anahid Ajemian in 1974

Background information
- Born: January 26, 1924; Manhattan, New York City, New York, United States
- Died: June 13, 2016 (aged 92) Manhattan, New York City, New York, United States
- Occupation: Musician
- Instrument: Violin
- Formerly of: The Composers Quartet

Anahid Marguerite Ajemian (Armenian: Անահիդ Մարգարիտ Աճեմյան; January 26, 1924 – June 13, 2016) was an American violinist of Armenian descent. Her career in contemporary music began from her desire to help young composers of her generation get their compositions performed. Additionally, she enjoyed performing the music of established contemporary composers. She included these composers with the traditional repertoire in her performances.

== Early life and education ==
Ajemian was born in Manhattan on January 26, 1924, to Armenian immigrant parents. Her father was a physician and her mother a pianist. She began her music studies early at the Institute of Musical Art, which later merged with the Juilliard School. After graduating from the Lincoln School, Ajemian continued her education at the Juilliard School, studying violin with Édouard Dethier and chamber music with Hans Letz and Felix Salmon, and played in the Juilliard orchestra under Albert Stoessel and Edgar Shenkman.

== Musical career ==
In 1946, while still a student of Édouard Dethier at the Juilliard Graduate School of Music, Ajemian won the Walter W. Naumburg Foundation Award. In the same year, she made her debut at Town Hall and received the Distinguished Achievement Medal from Mademoiselle magazine as the Young Woman of the Year in Music. Among the many honors that have followed, the Order of St. James appointed her a Knight of Malta for her lifelong support of contemporary classical music.

In 1947, she was a soloist with the Naumburg Orchestral Concerts, in the Naumburg Bandshell, Central Park, in the summer series.

With her pianist sister Maro Ajemian, she performed in Europe, Canada and throughout the United States in a wide repertoire including works which were written for them by such distinguished composers as John Cage, Henry Cowell, Alan Hovhaness, Ernst Krenek, Lou Harrison, Wallingford Riegger, Carlos Surinach, and Ben Weber. Together and separately, the Ajemian sisters recorded extensively for Columbia, RCA Victor, MGM and Composers Records, Inc. They were the first musicians to receive the Laurel Leaf Award of the Composers Alliance for Distinguished Service to American Music.

Ajemian and her sister were equally known for their interpretations of the standard classical repertoire. A unique feature of the many television programs they taped for NBC's Recital Hall and the National Educational Television Network was their series of programs comprising the complete cycle of all ten Beethoven Sonatas for Violin and Piano. They appeared as soloists under the batons of Dimitri Mitropoulos, Leopold Stokowski and Izler Solomon, and recorded with the latter two.

Also during the 1940s, Ajemian co-founded the New York City-based organization Friends of Armenian Music Committee, which did much to launch the career of fellow Armenian-American composer Alan Hovhaness, via a series of well-received New York concerts of his music. These concerts were repeated in Boston, San Francisco and Los Angeles. Ajemian and her husband, George Avakian, started Music for Moderns, a Town Hall, in 1957.

In the mid-sixties, Ajemian and her fellow violinist Matthew Raimondi founded the Composers String Quartet at the suggestion of Gunther Schuller, which quickly earned an international reputation and toured in more than 26 countries, including the Soviet Union, India, the Middle East, Africa, Australia, Japan, Southeast Asia and China. The Composers String Quartet recorded extensively for the Musical Heritage Society, Nonesuch Records, Composers Recordings, Inc. and Columbia Records among many others. The Quartet's 1970 recording of Elliott Carter's "First and Second Quartets" was honored by a Grammy nomination, received "Stereo Review's "Best Chamber Music Recording of the Year" Award, and was acclaimed by High Fidelity as "Best Quartet of the Year" and one of the "Fifty Greatest Albums of the Decade." Time magazine called it "an astonishingly brilliant and unique achievement."

== Teaching ==
The Quartet was in residence at Columbia University in New York City and the New England Conservatory of Music in Boston, Massachusetts. For many years, they were the primary performers at the Mt Desert Festival of Chamber Music in Northeast Harbor, Maine.

Ajemian was a long-time member of the Columbia University music faculty and served as a judge for several music organizations, including the annual Naumburg Foundation Awards.

== Personal life ==
She was married to George Avakian, a record producer and founding officer of the National Academy of Recording Arts and Sciences. They had three children: Maro, Anahid and Gregory.
