= Recital Hall =

American musical television program

Recital Hall is an American musical television program that debuted on NBC on July 8, 1951, and was broadcast intermittently until 1955.

== Format ==
Each 30-minute episode of Recital Hall featured a musician giving a solo performance. The setting — a small audience with the performer on stage — was an effort to form a recital-hall environment on the TV screen. The concert setting was complemented by the episode's being filmed "without comment, commercials or trick camera work".

The premiere featured pianist Gyorgy Sandor. Other artists who performed on the program included violinist Ruggiero Ricci, cellist Leonard Rose, and baritone William Warfield.

== Production ==
Charles Polacheck was the producer, with Kirk Browning and John Block as directors. Cameras "focused attentively on the soloist", avoiding closeups and often remaining stationary for minutes.

Episodes broadcast in 1953 originated at WPTZ in Philadelphia.

== Reception ==
Musicologist Sigmund Spaeth, in a review in Music Clubs Magazine, described Recital Hall as an example of "good intentions gone wrong". He acknowledged the "creditable attempt" to give viewers access to top-quality musicians, but he felt that productions failed to take advantage of the "intimacy and informality that alone can differentiate television from its competitors". As a result, he wrote that the program had been unable to appeal to viewers other than a "quota of serious musical devotees".

Critic Jack Gould, on the other hand, in a review in The New York Times, called the program "an altogether superb half hour of television" and suggested that it should be considered for a Peabody Award. He noted the successful creation of a recital-hall atmosphere and a level of relaxation rare in that era of television and added that the performers' repertoire was "effectively varied and eminently satisfying".

In a two-years-later review in the Times, Val Adams bemoaned the reduced number of broadcasts of Recital Hall (only four that season). Adams pointed out TV's advantage in providing a new dimension via close-ups, "bringing an even greater appreciation for the accomplishments of the musician."
