= String Quartet No. 4 (Babbitt) =

String Quartet No. 4 is the fourth of six chamber music works in the string quartet medium by the American composer Milton Babbitt.

Babbitt's Fourth Quartet was written in 1970, almost immediately after the Third Quartet. It is in a single movement, divided into twelve sections marked by (amongst other things) five different metronomic tempos, distributed 1–2–3–1–4–5–1–2–5–3–4–1. In contrast to its predecessor, the Fourth Quartet makes extensive use of coloristic instrumental effects, such as col legno, sul ponticello, and pizzicato glissando. Octave relations are especially important in this work. Contrasts of register, instrumental setting, timbre, duration and dynamics serve to articulate modes of set partitioning.

The basic pitch structure of the Fourth Quartet is an array containing 77 statements of the aggregate. It is the first of Babbitt's works to employ weighted aggregates.

== Discography ==
- Roger Sessions: String Quartet No. 2 (1951); Stefan Wolpe: String Quartet; Milton Babbitt: String Quartet No. 4. Juilliard String Quartet (Robert Mann, Joel Smirnoff, violins; Samuel Rhodes, viola; Joel Krosnick, violoncello). CD recording, stereo. CRI CD 587. New York: Composers Recordings, 1990.
