= Fine Arts Quartet =

American chamber music ensemble

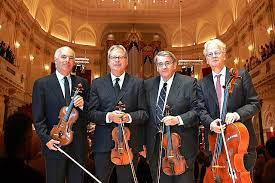

Background information
- Origin: Chicago, Illinois, United States
- Genres: Classical
- Occupation: String quartet
- Instruments: 2 violins, 1 viola, 1 cello
- Years active: 1946–present
- Members: Ralph Evans; Efim Boico; Gil Sharon; Niklas Schmidt
- Website: fineartsquartet.com

The Fine Arts Quartet is a chamber music ensemble founded in Chicago, United States in 1946 by Leonard Sorkin and George Sopkin. The Quartet has recorded over 200 works and has toured internationally for nearly 80 years, making it one of the longest enduring major string quartets. In its history, the Quartet has had two leaders: Leonard Sorkin, from 1946 to 1981, and Ralph Evans, from 1982 to the present. Its current members are violinists Ralph Evans and Efim Boico (who have been playing together in the Quartet since 1983), violist Gil Sharon, and cellist Niklas Schmidt.

== History ==
Although the Fine Arts Quartet was founded in 1946, the group's members had begun working together as early as 1939 while playing in the Chicago Symphony Orchestra. The Quartet's first performance took place in 1940 with Leonard Sorkin, Ben Senescu, Sheppard Lehnhoff, and George Sopkin. Military service in World War II intervened, however, and it was not until 1946, now with the new second violinist Joseph Stepansky, that the Quartet began to rehearse and perform regularly.

The Quartet members have helped nurture many young international ensembles. Their first teaching residency, 1951–1954, at Northwestern University, was followed by a 55-year residency, 1963-2018 (concluded in January 2018), as Quartet-in-Residence at the University of Wisconsin–Milwaukee. In 1982, Leonard Sorkin founded the Chamber Music Institute at the University of Wisconsin-Milwaukee, and became its first director and served in that capacity until his death in 1985.

The Quartet members have also been guest professors at the national music conservatories of Paris and Lyon, the Royal Academy and Royal College of Music in London, the summer music schools of Yale University and Indiana University, and at music festivals world-wide. They have appeared as jury members of major competitions such as Evian, Shostakovich, and Bordeaux. Documentaries on the Fine Arts Quartet have appeared on both French and American public television.

== Early recordings and performance ==
The Quartet performed on the ABC Radio Network's Sunday morning broadcasts from 1946 until 1954. In the mid-fifties and early sixties, there was an appearance on The Ed Sullivan Show (with Benny Goodman), performances on the Today Show, and starting in 1958, the Quartet began to tour Europe annually. In the late sixties, the United States Department of State sponsored the Quartet's tours to Japan, Korea, Taiwan, Thailand, Australia and New Zealand, and by the late seventies, the Quartet had performed in 270 cities in 28 countries. The Quartet continued to broadcast for radio in America (especially for WFMT-Chicago), in Europe (e.g. the BBC), and for television (concerts and educational programs for National Public Television).

The Quartet released over 100 works during its first 30 years of existence, including cycles of chamber music by Haydn, Mozart, Beethoven, Schubert, Mendelssohn, and Brahms, on such labels as Decca, Vox, Vanguard, Saga, and Concert Disc. The Quartet also performed contemporary music in performances, commissions, and recordings, and helped to make composers such as Bartók, Shostakovich, Bloch, Babbitt, Wuorinen, Martinon, Hindemith, Shifrin, Crawford-Seeger, Johnston, and Husa better known and accessible to the public. Their recordings of the six quartets of Béla Bartók followed a television series featuring a performance of each, preceded by interviews and commentary by the performers, with musical illustrations. The quartet was an advocate of what was then still comparatively unfamiliar and avant-garde repertoire.

== Recent recordings ==
The Quartet's extensive discography includes releases of the piano quartets and quintets of Saint-Saëns and Schumann, the string quartets of Zimbalist and Kreisler, "Harmonies du Soir" by Ysaÿe for quartet and string orchestra, clarinet quintets by Bernard Herrmann and David del Tredici, the two Saint-Saëns string quartets, three Beethoven string quintets, the Franck string quartet and piano quintet, the two Fauré piano quintets, the complete Bruckner chamber music (including his string quartet and quintet), quartets by American composers (Antheil, Herrmann, Glass, Evans), the complete Schumann string quartets, the two Mendelssohn string quintets, chamber music by Glazunov, the complete Dohnányi string quartets and piano quintets, the complete Mozart String Quintets, and the complete Op.18 Beethoven quartets. A complete discography is listed below.

== Recognition ==
The Quartet's Fauré quintets CD on Naxos with pianist Cristina Ortiz was among the five recordings for which music producer Steven Epstein won a Grammy Award in 2010 ("Producer of the Year, Classical"). It was also named a "Gramophone award-winner and recording of legendary status" in the 2012 Gramophone Classical Music Guide. Its Glazunov, Mendelssohn, and Fauré CDs were each named a "Recording of the Year" by Musicweb International in 2007, 2008, 2009, respectively. Their "Four American Quartets" album was designated a "BBC Music Magazine Choice" in 2008. The Quartet's Schumann CD was called "one of the very finest chamber music recordings of the year" by the American Record Guide in 2007, and its box set of the complete Mozart string quintets, released by Lyrinx in SACD format, was named a "Critic's Choice 2003" by the American Record Guide. Special recognition was given for the Quartet's commitment to contemporary music: a 2003-2004 national CMA/ASCAP Award for Adventurous Programming, given jointly by Chamber Music America and the American Society of Composers, Authors, and Publishers.

== Membership history ==
1st Violin:

- Leonard Sorkin (1946–1982)
- Ralph Evans (1982–present)

2nd Violin:

- Joseph Stepansky (1946–1954)
- Abram Loft (1954–1979)
- Lawrence Shapiro (1979–1983)
- Efim Boico (1983–present)

Viola:

- Sheppard Lehnhoff (1946–1952)
- Irving Ilmer (1952–1963)
- Gerald Stanick (1963–1968)
- Bernard Zaslav (1968–1980)
- Jerry Horner (1980–2000)
- Michael Strauss (2000–2001)
- Yuri Gandelsman (2001–2008)
- Chauncey Patterson (2008–2009)
- Nicolò Eugelmi (2009–2013)
- Juan-Miguel Hernandez (2014–2018)
- Gil Sharon (2018–present)

Violoncello:

- George Sopkin (1946–1979)
- Wolfgang Laufer (1979–2011)
- Robert Cohen (2012–2018)
- Niklas Schmidt (2018–present)

== Discography (1947–2025) ==
- Adler Quartet No.6 (1975), CRI SD-432 (rec 1979)
- Antes Trio No.1, Columbia masterworks AMS 6741 (rec 1964)
- Antes Trio No.2, Columbia masterworks AMS 6741 (rec 1964)
- Antes Trio No.3, Columbia masterworks AMS 6741 (rec 1964)
- Antheil Quartet No.3, (1948), Naxos CD 8.559354 (rec 2007)
- Arriaga Quartet No.1, SWR10116 (rec 1996)
- Arriaga Theme and Variations, Op.17, SWR10116 (rec 2005)
- Babbitt Quartet No.3, M&A CD-707, Turnabout TV-S-34515 (rec 1972)
- Bach Art of the Fugue, Concert-Disc CS-230, 250, Saga XID5302 (rec 1962 and 1964)
- Bartok Quartet No.1, Concert-Disc CS-207, Saga Xiud5203, M&A CD-1176 (rec 1958)
- Bartok Quartet No.2, Concert-Disc CS-207, Saga Xiud5203, M&A CD-1176 (rec 1958)
- Bartok Quartet No.3, Concert-Disc CS-208, M&A CD-1176 and CD-1154 (rec 1958)
- Bartok Quartet No.4, Concert-Disc CS-208, M&A CD-1176 (rec 1958)
- Bartok Quartet No.5, Concert-Disc CS-209, M&A CD-1176 (rec 1958)
- Bartok Quartet No.6, Concert-Disc CS-209, M&A CD-1176 (rec 1958)
- Beethoven Allegretto for String Quartet in B Minor, WoO 210, Hess 35 (Gardi 16), Naxos CD 8.574051, (rec 2018)
- Beethoven Fugue for String Quartet from the Overture to Handel's “Solomon”, Hess 36, Naxos CD 8.574051, (rec 2018)
- Beethoven Menuett for String Quartet in A flat Major, Hess 33, WoO209, Naxos CD 8.574051, (rec 2018)
- Beethoven Prelude and Fugue for String Quartet in F Major, Hess 30, Naxos CD 8.574051, (rec 2018)
- Beethoven Prelude and Fugue for String Quartet in C Major, Hess 31, Naxos CD 8.574051, (rec 2018)
- Beethoven Prelude for String Quartet (concluding fragment) in D Minor, Hess 245, Naxos CD 8.574051, (rec 2018)
- Beethoven Quartet Op.18-1, Lyrinx CD LYR 2254, Super Audio CD format (rec 2005)
- Beethoven Quartet Op.18-1, (original Amenda version) Hess 32, Naxos CD 8.574051, (rec 2018)
- Beethoven Quartet Op.18-1, Concert-Disc CS-210, CS-507, M-1210, SP-507, Everest SDBR-3255, M&A CD-1154 (rec 1963–66)
- Beethoven Quartet Op.18-2, Lyrinx CD LYR 2254, Super Audio CD format (rec 2005)
- Beethoven Quartet Op.18-2, Concert-Disc CS-210, CS-507, M-1210, SP-507, Everest SDBR-3255 (rec 1963–66)
- Beethoven Quartet Op.18-3, Lyrinx CD LYR 2254, Super Audio CD format (rec 2005)
- Beethoven Quartet Op.18-3, Concert-Disc CS-210, CS-507, M-1210, SP-507, Everest SDBR-3255 (rec 1959)
- Beethoven Quartet Op.18-4, Lyrinx CD LYR 2254, Super Audio CD format (rec 2005)
- Beethoven Quartet Op.18-4, Saga Records (London), (rec 1985) unreleased
- Beethoven Quartet Op.18-4, Concert-Disc CS-210, CS-507, M-1210, SP-507, Everest SDBR-3255 (rec 1959)
- Beethoven Quartet Op.18-5, Lyrinx CD LYR 2254, Super Audio CD format (rec 2005)
- Beethoven Quartet Op.18-5, Concert-Disc CS-210, CS-507, M-1210, SP-507, Everest SDBR-3255 (rec 1963–66)
- Beethoven Quartet Op.18-6, Lyrinx CD LYR 2254, Super Audio CD format (rec 2005)
- Beethoven Quartet Op.18-6, Concert-Disc CS-210, CS-507, M-1210, SP-507, Everest SDBR-3255 (rec 1963–66)
- Beethoven Quartet Op.59-1, Everest 9053 and SDBR-3255, M&A CD-1154, Concert-Disc MP-1506, CS-255 (rec 1965)
- Beethoven Quartet Op.59-2, Everest 9053, CS-256, Everest SDBR-3255, M&A CD-1154, Concert-Disc MP-1506 (rec 1965)
- Beethoven Quartet Op.59-3, Lodia (Geneva) CD 7701 (rec 1986)
- Beethoven Quartet Op.59-3, Everest 9053, CS-256, Everest SDBR-3255, M&A CD-1154, Concert-Disc MP-1506 (rec 1965)
- Beethoven Quartet Op.74, Everest 9053, Everest SDBR-3255, Concert-Disc MP-1506 (rec 1965)
- Beethoven Quartet Op.95, Everest 9053, Everest SDBR-3255, Concert-Disc MP-1506 (rec 1965)
- Beethoven Quartet Op.127, Concert-Disc CS-233, CS-502, SP-502, Everest SDBR-3255 (rec 1962-63?)
- Beethoven Quartet Op.130, Concert-Disc CS-502, CS-240, SP-502, Everest SDBR-3255 (inc alternate ending) (rec 1962-63?)
- Beethoven Quartet Op.131, Concert-Disc CS 502, CS-211, SP-502, Everest SDBR 3255, M-1211 (rec 1960)
- Beethoven Quartet Op.131, (original version of first movement), Naxos CD 8.574051, (rec 2018)
- Beethoven Quartet Op.132, Concert-Disc CS 502, M-1241, SP-502, Everest SDBR-3255, CS-241, M&A CD-1154 (rec 1962-63?)
- Beethoven Quartet Op.133, Grosse Fuge, Naxos CD 8.574051, (rec 2018)
- Beethoven Quartet Op.133 Grosse Fuge, Concert-Disc 249, SP-502, Everest SDBR-3255 (rec 1962-63?)
- Beethoven Quartet Op.135, Concert-Disc CS-502, CS-249, SP-502, Everest SDBR-3255 (rec 1962-63?)
- Beethoven String Quintet, Op.29 (w/ G. Sharon), Naxos CD 8.572221 (rec 2008)
- Beethoven String Quintet, Op.104 (w/ G. Sharon), Naxos CD 8.572221 (rec 2008)
- Beethoven String Quintet, Op.137 (w/ G. Sharon), Naxos CD 8.572221 (rec 2008)
- Beethoven Septet, Concert-Disc CS-214 (rec 1960)
- Bloch Piano Quintet No.1, Concert-Disc CS-252 and CDM-1252 (rec 1960)
- Bloch Quartet No.5, Concert-Disc CS-225, M-1225, Concertapes 4T-5008 (rec 1960)
- Boccherini Quintet in E Major (Minuet only), Webcor #2922-3/Concert Tapes 22-3 (1953–4)
- Borodin Quartet No.2 (Scherzo only), Webcor #2923-1 (rec 1953–4)
- Borodin Quartet No.2 (Nocturne only), Webcor #2922-3/ConcertTapes 22-3 (1953–4)
- Brahms Quartet Op.51-1, Concert-Disc CS-226 (rec 1960)
- Brahms Quartet Op.51-2, Concert-Disc CS-226, M&A CD-1154 (rec 1960)
- Brahms Quartet Op.67, Everest SDBR-3266 (rec late 1960s)
- Brahms Clarinet Quintet, Op.115 (R. Kell), Concert-Disc CS-202, Deutsche Grammophon, BSD-135 (rec 1951 and 1958)
- Brahms Horn Trio, M&A CD-1154 (rec 1971)
- Bruckner Intermezzo (w/ T. Hoffman) SWR 10242 (rec 2003)
- Bruckner Intermezzo (w/ Gil Sharon), Naxos CD 8.570788 (rec 2007)
- Bruckner String Quartet in C Minor, SWR 10241 (rec 2003)
- Bruckner String Quartet in C Minor, Naxos CD 8.570788 (rec 2007)
- Bruckner Rondo in C Minor, SWR 10241 (rec 2003)
- Bruckner Rondo in C Minor, Naxos CD 8.570788 (rec 2007)
- Bruckner String Quintet (w/ T. Hoffman) SWR 10242 (rec 2003)
- Bruckner String Quintet (w/ G. Sharon), Naxos CD 8.570788 (rec 2007)
- Crawford-Seeger Quartet, Gasparo CD-1020, GS-205 (rec 1979?)
- Debussy Quartet Op.10, Lodia CD 7702 (rec 1986)
- Debussy Quartet, Webcor #2923-1 (rec 1953–4), Concert-Disc LP CS-253, (rec 1964)
- Del Tredici Clarinet Quintet "Magyar Madness" (2006), Naxos CD 8.559796 (rec 2015)
- Dittersdorf Quartet in E Flat, Webcor #2922-4/Concert Tapes 22-4 (rec 1953–4)
- Dohnányi Quartet No.1, Aulos Musikado CD AUL 66145, SWR 10043 (rec 2002)
- Dohnányi Quartet No.2, Aulos Musikado CD AUL 66145, SWR 10043 (rec 2002)
- Dohnányi Quartet No.3, Aulos Musikado CD AUL 66145, SWR 10043 (rec 2002)
- Dohnányi Piano Quintet No.1 (w/ P. Frankl), Aulos Musikado CD, AUL 66146 (rec 2002)
- Dohnányi Piano Quintet No.2 (w/ P. Frankl), Aulos Musikado CD, AUL 66146 (rec 2002)
- Downey Bassoon Quintet (w/ R. Thompson), Heritage HTGCD 402 (rec 2002)
- Downey String Quartet No.2, Gasparo CD-1020, GS 205 (rec 1979?)
- Dvorak Maličkosti (Bagatelles) Op.47, Naxos CD 8.574513 (rec 2021)
- Dvorak Piano Quintet, Concert-Disc CS-251 (rec 1964)
- Dvorak String Quartet No.2 in B flat major, B.17, Naxos CD 8.574513 (rec 2022)
- Dvorak String Quartet No.4 in E Minor, B.19, Naxos CD 8.574205 (rec 2019)
- Dvorak String Quartet Op.96 ("American"), Lyrinx (France) CD LYR-184 (rec 1998)
- Dvorak String Quartet Op.96 ("American"), Gasparo Records LP GS-223 (rec 1985)
- Dvorak String Quartet, Op.96, Webcor #2923-2 (rec 1953–4)
- Dvorak String Quartet Op.105, Lyrinx CD LYR-184 (rec 1998)
- Dvorak String Sextet, Op.48, (w/ Anna-Kreeta Gribajcevic and Jens Peter Maintz), Naxos CD 8.574205 (rec 2019)
- Enescu Aubade, Naxos CD 8.574487 (rec 2022)
- Enescu Pastorale, Menuet Triste, & Nocturne, w/ Witkowski Duo, Naxos CD 8.574487 (rec 2022)
- Enescu Piano Quintet in D Major (1896) w/ G. Witkowski, Naxos CD 8.574487 (rec 2022)
- Enescu Prelude & Gavotte (w/ Witkowski Duo), Naxos CD 8.574487 (rec 2022)
- Enescu Rhapsody No.1, Op.11 (arr Enoch for Piano Quintet + bass), with F. Witkowski & A. Bickard, Naxos CD 8.574487 (rec 2022)
- Evans String Quartet No.1 (1995), Naxos CD 8.559354 (rec 2007)
- Fauré Piano Quintet No.1 (w/ C. Ortiz), Op. 89, Naxos CD 8.570938 (rec 2007)
- Fauré Piano Quintet No.2 (w/ C. Ortiz), Op.115, Naxos CD 8.570938 (rec 2007)
- Franck String Quartet, Naxos CD 8.572009 (rec 2008)
- Franck Piano Quintet (w/ C. Ortiz), Naxos CD 8.572009 (rec 2008)
- Glass Quartet No.2 "Company" (1983), Naxos CD 8.559354 (rec 2007)
- Glazunov String Quartet (Five Novelettes), Op.15, Naxos CD 8.570256 (rec 2005)
- Glazunov String Quintet (w/ N. Rosen), Op.39, Naxos CD 8.570256 (rec 2005)
- Haydn Divertimento Op.0, Vox box SVBX-597 (rec 1972?)
- Haydn Quartet Op.1-0, M&A CD-1154 (1968-73?)
- Haydn Quartet Op.2-5, Vox box SVBX-597, M&A CD-1154 (rec 1972?)
- Haydn Quartet Op.2-6, Vox box SVBX-597, M&A CD-1154 (rec 1972?)
- Haydn Quartet Op.3-1, Vox box SVBX-598 (rec 1964)
- Haydn Quartet Op.3-2, Vox box SVBX-598 (rec 1964)
- Haydn Quartet Op.3-3, Vox box SVBX-598 (rec 1964)
- Haydn Quartet Op.3-4, Vox box SVBX-598 (rec 1964)
- Haydn Quartet Op.3-5, Vox box SVBX-598 (rec 1964)
- Haydn Quartet Op.3-6, Vox box SVBX-598 (rec 1964)
- Haydn Quartet Op.20-4, Concert-Disc CS-228 (rec 1960)
- Haydn Quartet Op.20-5, M&A CD-1154
- Haydn Quartet Op.50-1, Vox box SVBX-595 (rec 1967)
- Haydn Quartet Op.50-2, Vox box SVBX-595 (rec 1967)
- Haydn Quartet Op.50-3, Vox box SVBX-595 (rec 1967)
- Haydn Quartet Op.50-4, Vox box SVBX-595 (rec 1967)
- Haydn Quartet Op.50-5, Vox box SVBX-595 (rec 1967)
- Haydn Quartet Op.50-6, Vox box SVBX-595 (rec 1967)
- Haydn Quartet Op.54-1, Saga Records (London), (rec 1985) unreleased
- Haydn Quartet Op.64-1, Vox box SVBX-597, Concert-Disc CS-228 (rec 1972?)
- Haydn Quartet Op.64-2, Vox box SVBX-597, Concert-Disc CS-228 (rec 1972?)
- Haydn Quartet Op.64-3, Vox box SVBX-597, Concert-Disc CS-228 (rec 1972?)
- Haydn Quartet Op.64-4, Vox box SVBX-597, Concert-Disc CS-228 (rec 1972?)
- Haydn Quartet Op.64-5, ("Lark"), Lodia CD 7701 (rec 1986)
- Haydn Quartet Op.64-5, Vox box SVBX-597, Concert-Disc CS-228 (rec 1972?)
- Haydn Quartet Op.64-5, (Adagio cantabile), Webcor #2923-2 (rec 1953–4)
- Haydn Quartet Op.64-5, (Finale only), Webcor #2922-3/Concert Tapes 22-3 (1953–4)
- Haydn Quartet Op.64-6, Vox box SVBX-597, Concert-Disc CS-228, M&A CD-1154
- Haydn Quartet Op.74-1, Vox box SVBX-598 (rec 1964)
- Haydn Quartet Op.74-2, Vox box SVBX-598 (rec 1964)
- Haydn Quartet Op.74-3, Vox box SVBX-598 (rec 1964)
- Haydn Quartet Op.76-1, Vox box SVBX-695 and 596 (rec late 60s?)
- Haydn Quartet Op.76-2, Webcor Tape (2nd mve only), Vox box SVBX-695 and 596, Concert-Disc CS-228 (rec 1954,1960, 1968?)
- Haydn Quartet Op.76-3 (Poco adagio; cantabile movement), Webcor #2923-1 (rec 1953–4)
- Haydn Quartet Op.76-3, Vox box SVBX-695 and 596 (rec late 60s?)
- Haydn Quartet Op.76-4, Vox box SVBX-695 and 596, M&A CD-1154 (rec late 60s?)
- Haydn Quartet Op.76-5, Vox box SVBX-695 and 596 (rec late 60s?)
- Haydn Quartet Op.76-6, Vox box SVBX-695 and 596, M&A CD-1154 (rec late 60s?)
- Haydn Quartet Op.77-1, Lyrinx CD LYR-196 (rec 1998–99)
- Haydn Quartet Op.77-2, Lyrinx CD LYR-196 (rec 1998–99)
- Haydn Quartet Op.103, Vox box SVBX-695 and 596 (rec late 1960s)
- Herrmann Quartet "Echoes" (1965), Naxos CD 8.559354 (rec 2007)
- Herrmann Clarinet Quintet "Souvenir de Voyages" (1967), Naxos CD 8.559796 (rec 2013)
- Hindemith Quartet, Op.22, Concert-Disc CS-225, M-1225, M&A CD-1154, Concertapes 4T-5008 (rec 1960)
- Hindemith Quartet, Op.22, Mercury MG 10105 (rec 1951),
- Hindemith Octet, Concert-Disc M-1218 (rec 1960)
- Husa Quartet No.2 (1953), Phoenix PHCD-113 (rec 1971)
- Husa Quartet No.3 (1968), Phoenix PHCD-113, M&A CD-1154 (rec 1971)
- Johnston Quartet No.4 "Amazing Grace" (1973), Gasparo CD-1020, GS-205 (rec 1979?)
- Kreisler Quartet in A Minor (1919), Naxos CD 8.572559 (rec 2010)
- Martinon Quartet No.2 (1967), M&A CD-1154 (rec 1967)
- Mendelssohn Quartet Op.12, Mercury MG 10065, EP-1-5066, (rec 1950)
- Mendelssohn Quartet Op.12, Concert Disc M-1224, CS-224, CP-505 (rec 1960)
- Mendelssohn Quartet Op.44-1, Concert-Disc SP-505, CS-260 (rec 1965)
- Mendelssohn Quartet Op.44-1, Koss Classics CD (rec 1991) unreleased
- Mendelssohn Quartet Op.44-2, Concert Disc CD-224, M-1224, CP-505 (rec 1960)
- Mendelssohn Quartet Op.44-2, Koss Classics CD (rec 1991) unreleased
- Mendelssohn Quartet Op.44-2 (Scherzo only), Webcor #2922-3/Concert Tapes 22-3 (1953–4)
- Mendelssohn Quartet Op.81, Concert-Disc SP-505, CS-260 (rec 1965)
- Mendelssohn String Quintet movement (Andante Scherzando) from Op.87, Concert-Disc CP-505, CD-261 (rec 1962?)
- Mendelssohn String Octet, Concert-Disc SP-505, CS-261, Vanguard VRS-1003 (rec 1957?, 1965?)
- Mendelssohn String Quintet No.1, Op.18, (w/ D. Rossi), Naxos CD 8.570488 (rec 2007)
- Mendelssohn String Quintet No.2, Op.87, (w/ D. Rossi), Naxos CD 8.570488 (rec 2007)
- Mozart Flute Quartet K.285, Concert-Disc CS-215, BSD CD-142 (rec 1960)
- Mozart Flute Quartet K.285a, Concert-Disc CS-215, BSD CD-142 (rec 1960)
- Mozart Flute Quartet K.285b, Concert-Disc CS-215, BSD CD-142 (rec 1960)
- Mozart Flute Quartet K.298, Concert-Disc CS-215, BSD CD-142 (rec 1960)
- Mozart Horn Quintet K.407, Orion ORS-7281, Marquis CD-83108, Concert-Disc CS-204, M&A CD-1154 (rec 1958)
- Mozart Oboe Quartet K.370, Orion ORS-7281, Marquis CD-83108, Concert-Disc CS-204, BSD CD-142 (rec 1958)
- Mozart Piano Concerto No. 9, KV 271 arr. I. Lachner, (with A. Goldstein), Naxos CD 8.574164 (rec 2019)
- Mozart Piano Concerto No.16, KV 451 arr. I. Lachner, (with A. Goldstein), Naxos CD 8.574738 (rec 2025)
- Mozart Piano Concerto No.17, KV 453 arr. I. Lachner, (with A. Goldstein), Naxos CD 8.574164 (rec 2019)
- Mozart Piano Concerto No.18, KV 456 arr. I. Lachner, (with A. Goldstein), Naxos CD 8.574693 (rec 2024)
- Mozart Piano Concerto No.19, KV 459 arr. I. Lachner, (with A. Goldstein), Naxos CD 8.574477 (rec 2022)
- Mozart Piano Concerto No.20, KV 466 arr. I. Lachner, (with A. Goldstein), Naxos CD 8.573398 (rec 2014)
- Mozart Piano Concerto No.21, KV 467 arr. I. Lachner, (with A. Goldstein), Naxos CD 8.573398 (rec 2014)
- Mozart Piano Concerto No.22, KV 482 arr. I. Lachner, (with A. Goldstein), Naxos CD 8.574693 (rec 2024)
- Mozart Piano Concerto No.23, KV 488 arr. I. Lachner, (with A. Goldstein), Naxos CD 8.573736 (rec 2017)
- Mozart Piano Concerto No.24, KV 491 arr. I. Lachner, (with A. Goldstein), Naxos CD 8.573736 (rec 2017)
- Mozart Piano Concerto No.25, KV 503 arr. I. Lachner, (with A. Goldstein), Naxos CD 8.574477 (rec 2022)
- Mozart Piano Concerto No.26, KV 537 arr. I. Lachner, (with A. Goldstein), Naxos CD 8.574738 (rec 2025)
- Mozart Piano Quartet No.2, M&A CD-1154 (rec 1967)
- Mozart String Quartet: Adagio and Fugue, K.546, M&A CD-1154 (rec 1967)
- Mozart String Quartet K.387, Concertapes 23-4A Stereo 2 track (rec 1952–63)
- Mozart String Quartet K.421, Concert-Disc CS-227, M-1227, CS-504, SP-504 (rec 1960)
- Mozart String Quartet K.428, Concert-Disc CS-258, SP-504 (rec 1965)
- Mozart String Quartet K.458, M&A CD-1154 (rec 1968?)
- Mozart String Quartet K.465 ("Dissonant"), Lodia CD 7700 and 7704 (rec 1986)
- Mozart String Quartet K.465, Concert-Disc CS-227, M-1227, CS-504, SP-504 (rec 1960)
- Mozart String Quartet K.499, M&A CD-1154 (rec 1967)
- Mozart String Quartet K.575, Concert-Disc CS-258, SP-504 (rec 1964)
- Mozart String Quartet K.589, Concert-Disc SP-504, CS-1259 (rec 1964)
- Mozart String Quartet K.590, Concert-Disc SP-504, CS-1259 (rec 1964)
- Mozart Clarinet Quintet K.581 (R. Kell), Decca, Concert-Disc CS-203, Deutsche Grammophon, BSD-135 (rec 1951 and 1958)
- Mozart String Quintet K.174 (w/ Y. Gandelsman), Lyrinx CD LYR 2214 Super Audio CD format (rec 2001)
- Mozart String Quintet K.174, Vox box SVBX-557, M&A CD-1159 (rec 1974)
- Mozart String Quintet K.406 (w/ Y. Gandelsman), Lyrinx CD LYR 2214 Super Audio CD format (rec 2001)
- Mozart String Quintet K.406 (w/ J. Dupouy), Lodia CD 7704 (rec 1986)
- Mozart String Quintet K.406, Vox box SVBX-557, M&A CD-1159 (rec 1974)
- Mozart String Quintet K.515 (w/ J. Dupouy), Lodia CD 7703 (rec 1986)
- Mozart String Quintet K.515 (w/ Y. Gandelsman), Lyrinx CD LYR 2214 Super Audio CD format (rec 2001)
- Mozart String Quintet K.515, Vox box SVBX-557, M&A CD-1159 (rec 1974)
- Mozart String Quintet K.516 (w/ J. Dupouy), Lodia CD 7703 (rec 1986)
- Mozart String Quintet K.516 (w/ Y. Gandelsman), Lyrinx CD LYR 2214 Super Audio CD format (rec 2001)
- Mozart String Quintet K.516, Vox box SVBX-557, M&A CD-1159 (rec 1974)
- Mozart String Quintet K.593 (w/ Y. Gandelsman), Lyrinx CD LYR 2214 Super Audio CD format (rec 2001)
- Mozart String Quintet K.593, Vox box SVBX-557, M&A CD-1159 (rec 1974)
- Mozart String Quintet K.614 (w/ Y. Gandelsman), Lyrinx CD LYR 2214 Super Audio CD format (rec 2001)
- Mozart String Quintet K.614, Vox box SVBX-557, M&A CD-1159 (rec 1974)
- Peter Quintet No.1, Decca DXSA-7197 (rec 1967)
- Peter Quintet No.2, Decca DXSA-7197 (rec 1967)
- Peter Quintet No.3, Decca DXSA-7197 (rec 1967)
- Peter Quintet No.4, Decca DXSA-7197 (rec 1967)
- Peter Quintet No.5, Decca DXSA-7197 (rec 1967)
- Peter Quintet No.6, Decca DXSA-7197 (rec 1967)
- Prokofiev Quartet No.2, Gallante GG-1024, Mercury MG-10045 (rec 1946)
- Prokofiev Quartet No.2, Gasparo GS-203 (rec 1976)
- Rachmaninoff Quartet No.1, Lodia CD (rec 1986) unreleased
- Raff: The Mill, Webcor #2922-3/Concert Tapes 22-3 (rec 1953–4)
- Ravel Quartet, Lodia CD 7702 (rec 1986)
- Ravel Quartet, Concert-Disc CS-253 (rec 1964)
- Ravel Quartet, Mercury MG 10105 (rec 1951)
- Saint-Saëns Barcarolle, Op.108 (piano quartet version) (w/ C. Ortiz), Naxos CD 8.572904 (rec 2012)
- Saint-Saëns Piano Quartet, Op.41 (w/ C. Ortiz), Naxos CD 8.572904 (rec 2012)
- Saint-Saëns Piano Quintet, Op.14 (w/ C. Ortiz), Naxos CD 8.572904 (rec 2012)
- Saint-Saëns String Quartet No.1, Op.112, Naxos CD 8.572454, (rec 2009)
- Saint-Saëns String Quartet No.2, Op.153, Naxos CD 8.572454, (rec 2009)
- Schubert: Moment Musical, Webcor #2922-3/Concert Tapes 22-3 (1953–4)
- Schubert Quartettsatz, Mercury EP-1-5066, Mercury MG-10104 (1951)
- Schubert Quartet D 804 ("Rosamunde"), Everest SDBR-3266 (rec late 1960s)
- Schubert Quartet D 810 ("Death and the Maiden"), Lodia CD 7700 (rec 1986)
- Schubert Quartet D 810 ("Death and the Maiden"), Concert-Disc CS-212, BSD-145 (rec 1960)
- Schubert Quartet D 810 ("Death and the Maiden"), Mercury MG-10008 (rec 1947)
- Schubert Quartet Op.29, Everest SDBR-3266 (rec late 1960s)
- Schubert Quartet Op.29, Mercury MG-10065 (rec 1950)
- Schubert Quartet Op.125 (D.87), BSD-143 (rec 1960–2)
- Schubert Quartet Op.161, Mercury MG-10104 (rec 1951)
- Schubert Octet, D.803, Concert-Disc CS-220, Everest 6082, BSD-143 (rec 1960)
- Schubert Trout Quintet, Concert-Disc CS-206, M-1206, BSD-145 (rec 1958)
- Schumann Märchenerzählungen, Op. 132 (w/ X.Wang), Naxos CD 8.572661 (rec 2010)
- Schumann Piano Quartet Op.47 (w/ X. Wang), Naxos CD 8.572661 (rec 2010)
- Schumann Piano Quintet, Op.44 (w/ X. Wang), Naxos CD 8.572661 (rec 2010)
- Schumann Quartet, Op.41, No.1, Naxos CD 8.570151 (rec 2006)
- Schumann Quartet, Op.41, No.2, Naxos CD 8.570151 (rec 2006)
- Schumann Quartet, Op.41, No.3, Naxos CD 8.570151 (rec 2006)
- Shifrin Quartet No.4, CRI CD-793, SD-358, M&A CD-1154 (rec 1961)
- Shostakovich Quartet No.1, Op.49, Gasparo Records LP GS-223 (rec 1985)
- Shostakovich Quartet No.1, Op.49, Lyrinx CD, Super Audio CD format, unreleased (rec 2000)
- Shostakovich Quartet No.3, Op.73, Adès (Paris) CD 14.161-2 (rec 1989)
- Shostakovich Quartet No.3, Gasparo GS-203 (rec 1976)
- Shostakovich Quartet No.3, Mercury Classics MG-10049, DM3, Gallante GG-1024 (rec 1947)
- Shostakovich Quartet No.4, Op.83, Lyrinx CD, Super Audio CD format, unreleased (rec 2000)
- Shostakovich Quartet No.7, Op.108, Adès CD 14.161-2 (rec 1989)
- Shostakovich Quartet No.8, Op.110, Lyrinx CD, Super Audio CD format, unreleased (rec 2000)
- Shostakovich Quartet No.11, Op.122, Adès CD 14.161-2 (rec 1989)
- Spohr Nonet Op.31, Concert-Disc LP CS-201, Saga XID-5147 LP, ALC1266 CD (rec 1958)
- Tchaikovsky Quartet No.1 (Andante cantabile only), Webcor 2922-3/Concert Tapes 22-3 (1953–4)
- Turina: La oración del torero, Gasparo Records LP GS-223 (rec 1985)
- Turina: La oración del torero, Webcor #2922-4/Concert Tapes 22-4 (rec 1953–4)
- Wolf: Italian Serenade, Lodia CD 7701 (rec 1986)
- Wolf: Italian Serenade, Hänssler Classic CD 93.024 (rec 1998)
- Wolf: Italian Serenade, Webcor #2922-4/Concert Tapes 22-4 (rec 1953–4)
- Wolf: Quartet in D Minor, Hänssler Classic CD 93.024 (rec 1998)
- Wuorinen Quartet No.1 (1971), Vox LP, M&A CD-4707 (rec 1972)
- Ysaÿe: Harmonies du Soir, Op.31 (1924) (w/ Philharmonic Orchestra of Europe), Naxos CD 8.572559 (rec 2010)
- Zimbalist Quartet in E Minor (1931/rev 1959), Naxos CD 8.572559 (rec 2010)
