= Hala Sakakini =

Palestinian writer (1924–2002)

- Hala Sakakini in 1946
- Born: 7 June 1924
- Died: 2002 (aged 77–78)

Hala Sakakini (7 June 1924 – 2002) was a Palestinian writer.

She was born in the Old City of Jerusalem on 7 June 1924 and was the daughter of the poet Khalil Sakakini (1878-1953).

She published a memoir, Jerusalem and I: A Personal Record (1990) which describes her life in Jerusalem from her birth until 1948. It was published in English, and an Arabic translation was published in 2019.

== Selected publications ==
- Sakakini, Hala (1990). Jerusalem and I: A Personal Record.
- Sakakini, Hala (1993). Twosome.
