= Leonard Sorkin =

American violinist (1916–1985)

Leonard Sorkin (January 12, 1916 – June 7, 1985) was an American violinist.

== Biography ==
Sorkin was born in on January 12, 1916, in Chicago. He received violin training from Mischa Mischakoff. At age 18, he joined the Chicago Symphony Orchestra, where he remained until 1943. Sorkin served as concertmaster of the ABC Symphony from 1946 to 1954. In 1946, he helped found the Fine Arts Quartet, in which he played first violin until 1982. In 1983, Sorkin became founding director of the Institute of Chamber Music at the University of Wisconsin–Milwaukee.

Sorkin was married to Aviva Dolnick Sorkin (died March 16, 2009), who danced for many years with the Sybil Shearer Dance Company. He died on June 7, 1985, aged 69, of cancer, in Milwaukee. He is buried in Greenwood Cemetery in Milwaukee, Wisconsin. He is the father of theoretical physicist Rafael Sorkin and actress Naomi Sorkin.

== Awards ==
- New York Times Chamber Music Record of the Year
- Wisconsin Governor's Award for Outstanding Contributions to the Performing Arts
- Artist-Teacher of the Year, American String Teachers Association
