= The Composers Quartet =

The Composers String Quartet was a string quartet best known for performances of new works by contemporary composers, including quartets by Elliott Carter and Ruth Crawford Seeger. Carter's Fourth Quartet was dedicated to the Composers Quartet, who premiered the work in 1986. The group has performed quartets by more than 60 American composers, and has toured abroad extensively.

The quartet was founded in 1965, and remained active until the late 1990s. During the early 1970s it was the quartet-in-residence at New England Conservatory, where it sponsored a biennial composition prize. In 1975, the group became the quartet-in-residence at Columbia University, remaining at Columbia for at least two decades.

== Members ==
- Matthew Raimondi (d. 2024), violin
- Anahid Ajemian, violin
- Bernard Zaslav, viola (succeeded by Jean Dupouy, Jean Dane, and Ron Carbone; the quartet also recorded with violist Maureen Gallagher)
- Seymour Barab, cello (succeeded by Michael Rudiakov, Michael Haber and Mark Shuman)
