= Milton Babbitt =

American composer (1916–2011)

- Babbitt with the RCA Mark II synthesizer
- Born: May 10, 1916; Philadelphia, Pennsylvania, U.S.
- Died: January 29, 2011 (aged 94); Princeton, New Jersey, U.S.
- Education: New York University College of Arts & Science; Princeton University
- Occupations: Composer; Academic teacher
- Organizations: Columbia-Princeton Electronic Music Center
- Spouse: Sylvia Miller Babbitt
- Awards: Guggenheim Fellowship; Pulitzer Prize; Joseph H. Bearns Prize

Milton Byron Babbitt (May 10, 1916 – January 29, 2011) was an American composer, music theorist, mathematician and teacher. He was a Pulitzer Prize and MacArthur Fellowship recipient, recognized for his serial and electronic music. Babbitt's compositional approach was deeply inspired by Arnold Schoenberg's twelve-tone technique. He built a compositional system based on permutations of the total chromatic.

== Life and career ==
Babbitt was born on May 10, 1916, in Philadelphia to Albert E. Babbitt and Sarah Potamkin, who were Jewish. He was raised in Jackson, Mississippi. Babbitt began studying the violin when he was four, but soon switched to clarinet and saxophone. Early in his life he was attracted to jazz and theater music, and "played in every pit orchestra that came to town". Babbitt was making his own arrangements of popular songs by age 7, "wrote a lot of pop tunes for school productions", and won a local songwriting contest when he was 13. A Jackson newspaper called Babbitt a "whiz kid" and noted "that he had perfect pitch and could add up his family's grocery bills in his head. In his teens he became a great fan of jazz cornet player Bix Beiderbecke".

Babbitt's father was a mathematician, and Babbitt intended to study mathematics when he entered the University of Pennsylvania in 1931. He soon transferred to New York University, where he studied music under composers Philip James and Marion Bauer. There he became interested in the music of the composers of the Second Viennese School and wrote articles on twelve-tone music, including the first description of combinatoriality and a serial "time-point" technique. Babbitt was a pioneer in integral serialism, serially organizing dynamics and rhythms in addition to pitches. He emphasized the importance of composers pursuing composition as research rather than focusing on societal approval. After receiving his Bachelor of Arts degree in 1935 with Phi Beta Kappa honors, he studied under composer Roger Sessions, first privately and then at Princeton University. He joined Princeton's music faculty in 1938 and received one of the university's first Master of Fine Arts degrees in 1942.

He married Sylvia Miller, a statistician, in 1939, and the couple had a daughter.

During World War II, Babbitt divided his time between mathematical research in Washington, D.C., where Sylvia worked for the War Production Board, and Princeton, where he was a member of the mathematics faculty from 1943 to 1945.

In 1948, Babbitt returned to Princeton's music faculty, and in 1973 he joined the faculty of the Juilliard School. Among his students were music theorists David Lewin and John Rahn; composers Bruce Adolphe, Michael Dellaira, Kenneth Fuchs, Laura Karpman, Paul Lansky, Donald Martino, John Melby, Kenneth Lampl, Tobias Picker, and James K. Randall; the theater composer Stephen Sondheim; composer-pianists Frederic Rzewski and Richard Aaker Trythall; and the jazz guitarist and composer Stanley Jordan.

In 1958, Babbitt achieved unsought notoriety through an article in the popular magazine High Fidelity. His title for the article was originally "The Composer as Specialist" (and it was republished several times under that title) but "the editor, without my knowledge and—therefore—my consent or assent, replaced my title by the more 'provocative' one: 'Who Cares if You Listen?', a title which reflects little of the letter and nothing of the spirit of the article". In 1991, Babbitt said of the article's lasting notoriety: "For all that the true source of that offensively vulgar title has been revealed many times, in many ways, even—eventually—by the offending journal itself, I still am far more likely to be known as the author of 'Who Cares if You Listen?' than as the composer of music to which you may or may not care to listen". In 2006, Babbitt told the Princeton Alumni Weekly, "Now obviously, I care very deeply if you listen ... if nobody listens and nobody cares, you're not going to be writing music for very long".

Around 1960, Babbitt became interested in electronic music. RCA hired him as consultant composer to work with its RCA Mark II Synthesizer at the Columbia-Princeton Electronic Music Center in Manhattan. In 1960, Babbitt was awarded a Guggenheim Fellowship in music composition. In 1961, he wrote Composition for Synthesizer, marking the beginning of a second period in his output. Babbitt was less interested in producing new timbres than in the degree of rhythmic precision he could achieve with the synthesizer's sequencer.

Through the 1960s and 1970s, Babbitt wrote both electronic and acoustic music, often combining the two. Philomel (1964), for example, is for soprano and a synthesized accompaniment (including the recorded and manipulated voice of Bethany Beardslee, for whom the piece was composed) stored on magnetic tape.

By the end of the 1970s, Babbitt was beginning to shift his focus away from the electronic music that had first gained him public notice. His compositions are typically considered atonal, but it has also been shown that, especially in his third-period music, notes from his serial structures (all-partition arrays and superarrays) are sometimes arranged and coordinated to forge tonal chords, cadential phrases, simulated tonal voice-leading, and other tonal allusions, allowing for double meaning (serial and tonal), like many of his composition titles. This "double meaning" of pitches in the context of his double-meaning titles has been called portmantonality.

From 1985 until his death, Babbitt served as chairman of the BMI Student Composer Awards, an international competition for young classical composers. A resident of Princeton, New Jersey, he died there on January 29, 2011, aged 94. Babbitt's wife predeceased him, and he was survived by his daughter and two grandchildren.

Filmmaker Robert Hilferty's Babbitt: Portrait of a Serial Composer broadly depicts Babbitt's thinking, attitudes about his past, and work in footage largely from 1991 to 1992. The film was completed in 2010, and was presented on NPR online upon Babbitt's death.

== Honors and awards ==
- 1960 – Guggenheim Fellowship
- 1965 – Member of the American Academy of Arts and Letters
- 1974 – Fellow of the American Academy of Arts and Sciences
- 1982 – Pulitzer Prize, Special Citation, "for his life's work as a distinguished and seminal American composer"
- 1986 – MacArthur Fellow
- 1988 – Mississippi Institute of Arts and Letters Award for music composition
- 1999 – American Classical Music Hall of Fame
- 2000 – National Patron of Delta Omicron
- 2010 – The Max Reger Foundation of America – Extraordinary Life Time Musical Achievement Award

== Articles ==
- (1955). "Some Aspects of Twelve-Tone Composition". The Score and I.M.A. Magazine 12:53–61.
- (1958). "Who Cares if You Listen?". High Fidelity (February). [Babbitt called this article "The Composer as Specialist". The original title was changed without his knowledge or permission by an editor at High Fidelity.]
- (1960). "Twelve-Tone Invariants as Compositional Determinants," The Musical Quarterly 46/2.
- (1961). "Set Structure as Compositional Determinant," Journal of Music Theory 5/1.
- (1965). "The Structure and Function of Musical Theory," College Music Symposium 5.
- (1972). "Contemporary Music Composition and Music Theory as Contemporary Intellectual History", Perspectives in Musicology: The Inaugural Lectures of the Ph. D. Program in Music at the City University of New York, edited by Barry S. Brook, Edward Downes, and Sherman Van Solkema, 270–307. New York: W. W. Norton. ISBN 0-393-02142-4. Reprinted, New York: Pendragon Press, 1985. ISBN 0-918728-50-9.
- (1987) Words About Music: The Madison Lectures, edited by Stephen Dembski and Joseph Straus. Madison: University of Wisconsin Press.
- (1992) "The Function of Set Structure in the Twelve-Tone System." PhD Dissertation. Princeton: Princeton University.
- (2003). The Collected Essays of Milton Babbitt, edited by Stephen Peles, Stephen Dembski, Andrew Mead, Joseph Straus. Princeton: Princeton University Press.

== List of compositions ==
=== First period ===
- 1935 Generatrix for orchestra (unfinished)
- 1939–41 String Trio
- 1940 Composition for String Orchestra (unfinished)
- 1941 Symphony (unfinished)
- 1941 Music for the Mass I for mixed chorus
- 1942 Music for the Mass II for mixed chorus
- 1946 Fabulous Voyage (musical, libretto by Richard Koch)
- 1946 Three Theatrical Songs for voice and piano (taken from Fabulous Voyage)
- 1947 Three Compositions for Piano
- 1948 Composition for Four Instruments
- 1948 String Quartet No. 1 (withdrawn)
- 1948 Composition for Twelve Instruments
- 1949 Into the Good Ground film music (withdrawn)
- 1950 Composition for Viola and Piano
- 1951 The Widow's Lament in Springtime for soprano and piano
- 1951 Du for soprano and piano, August Stramm
- 1953 Woodwind Quartet
- 1954 String Quartet No. 2
- 1954 Vision and Prayer for soprano and piano (unpublished, unperformed)
- 1955 Two Sonnets for baritone, clarinet, viola, and cello, two poems of Gerard Manley Hopkins
- 1956 Duet for piano
- 1956 Semi-Simple Variations for piano
- 1957 All Set for jazz ensemble (alto saxophone, tenor saxophone, trumpet, trombone, contrabass, piano, vibraphone, and percussion)
- 1957 Partitions for piano
- 1960 Composition for Tenor and Six Instruments
- 1960 Sounds and Words for soprano and piano

=== Second period ===
- 1961 Composition for Synthesizer
- 1961 Vision and Prayer for soprano and synthesized tape, setting of a poem by Dylan Thomas
- 1964 Philomel for soprano, recorded soprano, synthesized tape, setting of a poem by John Hollander
- 1964 Ensembles for Synthesizer
- 1965 Relata I for orchestra
- 1966 Post-Partitions for piano
- 1966 Sextets for violin and piano
- 1966 Play on Notes for bells and voice
- 1967 Correspondences for string orchestra and synthesized tape
- 1968 Relata II for orchestra
- 1968–69 Four Canons for SA
- 1969 Phonemena for soprano and piano
- 1970 String Quartet No. 3
- 1970 String Quartet No. 4
- 1968–71 Occasional Variations for synthesized tape
- 1972 Tableaux for piano
- 1974 Arie da capo for five instrumentalists
- 1975 Reflections for piano and synthesized tape
- 1975 Phonemena for soprano and synthesized tape
- 1976 Concerti for violin, small orchestra, synthesized tape
- 1976 A Birthday Double Canon for SATB
- 1977 A Solo Requiem for soprano and two pianos
- 1977 Minute Waltz (or 3/4 ± 1/8) for piano
- 1977 Playing for Time for piano
- 1978 My Ends Are My Beginnings for solo clarinet
- 1978 My Complements to Roger for piano
- 1978 More Phonemena for twelve-part chorus
- 1978 Eppesithalamium for solo cello
- 1979 An Elizabethan Sextette for six-part women's chorus
- 1979 Images for saxophonist and synthesized tape

=== Third period ===
- 1979 Paraphrases for ten instrumentalists
- 1980 Dual for cello and piano
- 1981 Ars Combinatoria for small orchestra
- 1981 Don for four-hand piano
- 1982 The Head of the Bed for soprano and four instruments
- 1982 String Quartet No. 5
- 1982 Melismata for solo violin
- 1982 About Time for piano
- 1983 Canonical Form for piano
- 1983 Groupwise for flautist and four instruments
- 1984 Four Play for four players
- 1984 It Takes Twelve to Tango for piano
- 1984 Sheer Pluck (composition for guitar)
- 1985 Concerto for piano and orchestra
- 1985 Lagniappe for piano
- 1986 Transfigured Notes for string orchestra
- 1986 The Joy of More Sextets for piano and violin
- 1987 Three Cultivated Choruses for four-part chorus
- 1987 Fanfare for double brass sextet
- 1987 Overtime for piano
- 1987 Souper for speaker and ensemble
- 1987 Homily for snare drum
- 1987 Whirled Series for saxophone and piano
- 1988 In His Own Words for speaker and piano
- 1988 The Virginal Book for contralto and piano, setting of a poem by John Hollander
- 1988 Beaten Paths for solo marimba
- 1988 Glosses for Boys' Choir
- 1988 The Crowded Air for eleven instruments
- 1989 Consortini for five players
- 1989 Play It Again, Sam for solo viola
- 1989 Emblems (Ars Emblematica), for piano
- 1989 Soli e duettini for two guitars
- 1989 Soli e duettini for flute and guitar
- 1990 Soli e duettini for violin and viola
- 1990 Envoi for four hands, piano
- 1991 Preludes, Interludes, and Postlude for piano
- 1991 Four Cavalier Settings for tenor and guitar
- 1991 Mehr "Du" for soprano, viola and piano
- 1991 None but the Lonely Flute for solo flute
- 1992 Septet, But Equal
- 1992 Counterparts for brass quintet
- 1993 Around the Horn for solo horn
- 1993 Quatrains for soprano and two clarinets
- 1993 Fanfare for All for brass quintet
- 1993 String Quartet No. 6
- 1994 Triad for viola, clarinet, and piano
- 1994 No Longer Very Clear for soprano and four instruments, setting of a poem by John Ashbery
- 1994 Tutte le corde for piano
- 1994 Arrivals and Departures for two violins
- 1994 Accompanied Recitative for soprano sax and piano
- 1995 Manifold Music for organ
- 1995 Bicenquinquagenary Fanfare for brass quintet
- 1995 Quartet for piano and string trio
- 1996 Quintet for clarinet and string quartet
- 1996 Danci for solo guitar
- 1996 When Shall We Three Meet Again? for flute, clarinet and vibraphone
- 1998 Piano Concerto No. 2
- 1998 The Old Order Changeth for piano
- 1999 Composition for One Instrument for celesta
- 1999 Allegro Penseroso for piano
- 1999 Concerto Piccolino for vibraphone
- 2000 Little Goes a Long Way for violin and piano
- 2000 Pantuns for soprano and piano
- 2001 A Lifetime or So for tenor and piano
- 2002 From the Psalter soprano and string orchestra
- 2002 Now Evening after Evening for soprano and piano, setting of a poem by Derek Walcott
- 2002 A Gloss on 'Round Midnight for piano
- 2003 Swan Song No. 1 for flute, oboe, violin, cello, mandolin (or guitar), and guitar
- 2003 A Waltzer in the House for soprano and vibraphone, setting of a poem by Stanley Kunitz
- 2004 Round for SATB
- 2004 Concerti for Orchestra, for James Levine and the Boston Symphony Orchestra
- 2004 Autobiography of the Eye for soprano and cello, setting of a poem by Paul Auster
- 2005–6 More Melismata for solo cello
- 2006 An Encore for violin & piano

=== String quartets ===
First period

- 1948 String Quartet No. 1 (withdrawn)
- 1954 String Quartet No. 2

Second period

- 1970 String Quartet No. 3
- 1970 String Quartet No. 4

Third period

- 1982 String Quartet No. 5
- 1993 String Quartet No. 6

== Selected discography ==
- Piano Works. Three Compositions (1947–48); Duet (1956); Semi-Simple Variations (1956); Partitions (1957); Post-Partitions (1966); Tableaux (1973); Reflections (1974) For Piano And Synthesized Tape; Canonical Form (1983); Lagniappe (1985). Robert Taub, piano. Harmonia Mundi 905160.
- Clarinet Quintets. Phoenix Ensemble (Mark Lieb, clarinet; Aaron Boyd, Kristi Helberg, and Alicia Edelberg, violins; Cyrus Beroukhim, viola; Alberto Parinni and Bruce Wang, cellos). (Morton Feldman, Clarinet and String Quartet; Milton Babbitt, Quintet for Clarinet and String Quartet). Innova 746. St. Paul, Minnesota: American Composers Forum, 2009.
- Concerto for Piano And Orchestra/The Head Of The Bed. Alan Feinberg, piano; American Composers Orchestra, Charles Wuorinen, conductor; Judith Bettina, soprano, Parnassus, Anthony Korf. New World Records 80346.
- The Juilliard Orchestra. Vincent Persichetti: Night Dances (cond. James DePreist); Milton Babbitt: Relata I (cond. Paul Zukofsky); David Diamond: Symphony No. 5 (cond. Christopher Keene). New World Records 80396–2. New York: Recorded Anthology od Music, 1990.
- The Juilliard String Quartet: Sessions, Wolpe, Babbitt. Roger Sessions, String Quartet No. 2 (1951); Stefan Wolpe, String Quartet (1969); Milton Babbitt, String Quartet No. 4 (1970). The Juilliard Quartet (Robert Mann, Joel Smirnoff, violins; Samuel Rhodes, viola; Joel Krosnick, cello). CRI CD 587. New York: Composers Recordings, Inc., 1990.
- Occasional Variations (String Quartets no. 2 and No. 6, Occasional Variations, Composition for Guitar). William Anderson, guitar; Fred Sherry Quartet, Composers String Quartet. Tzadik 7088. New York: Tzadik, 2003.
- Philomel (Philomel, Phonemena for soprano and piano, Phonemena for soprano and tape, Post-Partitions, Reflections). Bethany Beardslee and Lynne Webber, sopranos; Jerry Kuderna and Robert Miller, pianos. New World Records 80466-2 / DIDX 022920. New York: Recorded Anthology of American Music, 1995. The material on this CD was issued on New World LPs NW 209 and NW 307, in 1977 and 1980, respectively.
- Quartet No. 3 for Strings. (With Charles Wuorinen, Quartet for Strings.) The Fine Arts Quartet. Turnabout TV-S 34515.
- Sextets; The Joy of More Sextets. Rolf Schulte, violin; Alan Feinberg, piano. New World Records NW 364–2. New York: Recorded Anthology of American Music, 1988.
- Soli e Duettini (Around the Horn, Whirled Series, None but the Lonely Flute, Homily, Beaten Paths, Play it Again Sam, Soli e Duettini, Melismata). The Group for Contemporary Music. Naxos 8559259.
- Three American String Quartets. Mel Powell, String Quartet (1982); Elliott Carter, Quartet for Strings No. 4 (1986); Milton Babbitt, Quartet No. 5 (1982). Composers Quartet (Matthew Raimondi, Anahid Ajemian, violins; Maureen Gallagher, Karl Bargen, violas; Mark Shuman, cello). Music & Arts CD-606. Berkeley: Music and Arts Program of America, Inc., 1990.
- An Elizabethan Sextette (An Elizabethan Sextette, Minute Waltz, Partitions, It Takes Twelve to Tango, Playing for Time, About Time, Groupwise, Vision And Prayer). Alan Feinberg, piano; Bethany Beardslee, soprano; The Group for Contemporary Music, Harvey Sollberger, conducting. CRI CD 521. New York: Composers Recordings, Inc., 1988. Reissued on CRI/New World NWCR521.

== Sources ==
- Anon. (n.d.(a)). "Milton Babbitt: All Set (1957)". www.hunsmire.net website (accessed 30 October 2012).
- Anon. (n.d.(b)). "Jewish Entertainers". Jewish Virtual Library (accessed 4 September 2013).
- Anon. (n.d.(c)). "Special Awards and Citations. The Pulitzer Prizes, website (accessed 3 December 2013).
- Anon. (2000). "Delta Omicron Announcements: Two Distinguished Musicians Inducted Into Delta Omicron". www.delta-omicron.org archives (accessed April 4, 2010; archive from 5 March 2012, accessed 12 June 2017)
- Anon. (2011a). "Book of Members, 1780–2010: Chapter B" (PDF). American Academy of Arts and Sciences.
- Anon. (2011b). "Obituaries: Milton Babbitt". Opera News. 75, no. 10 (April).
- Babbitt, Milton (1958). "Who Cares if You Listen?". High Fidelity (February).
- Babbitt, Milton (1991). "A Life of Learning: Charles Homer Haskins Lecture for 1991". ACLS Occasional Paper 17. New York: American Council of Learned Societies.
- Babbitt, Milton (2003). The Collected Essays of Milton Babbitt, edited by Stephen Peles, Stephen Dembski, Andrew Mead, Joseph Straus. Princeton: Princeton University Press. ISBN 0-691-08966-3.
- Barkin, Elaine, and Martin Brody (2001). "Babbitt, Milton (Byron)". The New Grove Dictionary of Music and Musicians, second edition, edited by Stanley Sadie and John Tyrrell. London: Macmillan Publishers; New York: Grove's Dictionaries of Music.
- Columbia University (1991). The Pulitzer Prizes, 1917–1991. New York: Columbia University.
- Cook, Amanda (June 8, 2013). "Milton Babbitt: Synthesized Music Pioneer". BetweenTheLedgerLines.
- Dembski, Stephen, and Joseph N. Straus, eds. (1987). Milton Babbitt: Words about Music. Madison, Wisconsin: University of Wisconsin Press. ISBN 0-299-10790-6.
- Duckworth, William (1995). Talking Music. Schirmer Books. ISBN 978-0-306-80893-7.
- Klafeta, Jennifer A., and Debbie Beckner (2009). Delta Omicron International Music Fraternity, National Website. Front page. (Accessed April 2010)
- Kozinn, Allan (2011). "Milton Babbitt, a Composer Who Gloried in Complexity, Dies at 94". The New York Times. (January 29). Retrieved January 30, 2011.
