= RCA Mark II Sound Synthesizer =

First programmable electronic music synthesizer

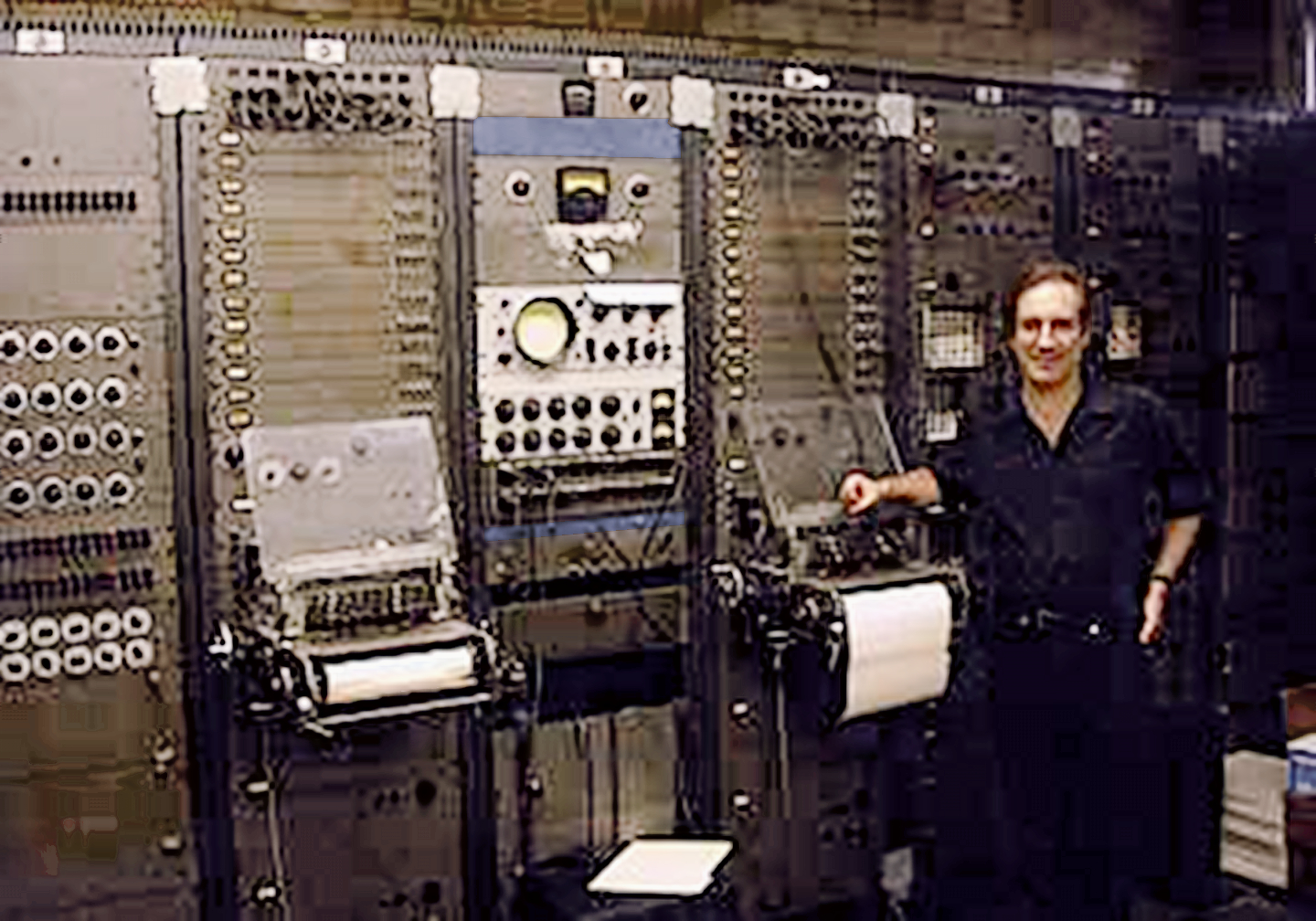
RCA Mark II

The RCA Mark II Sound Synthesizer (nicknamed "Victor") was the first programmable electronic music synthesizer. Designed by engineers Herbert Belar and Harry F. Olson at RCA with contributions from Peter Mauzey and composer Vladimir Ussachevsky, it was installed at the Columbia-Princeton Electronic Music Center at Columbia University in 1957. Consisting of a room-sized array of interconnected components, the Mark II gave the user more flexibility and had twice the number of tone oscillators as its predecessor, the Mark I. The development of the synthesizer and its acquisition by Columbia were funded by a large grant from the Rockefeller Foundation. An apocryphal story holds that Ussachevsky and Otto Luening convinced RCA to build the unit by claiming that it could "replace the symphony orchestra," prompting RCA executives to invest in the technology in the hopes of being able to eliminate their unionized radio orchestra.

Made to United States Air Force construction specifications (and sporting an Air Force oscilloscope), its active electronics were constructed entirely with vacuum tubes. While earlier electronic instruments had been manually operated, the RCA Mark II combined diverse electronic sound generation with a punched paper roll-based music sequencer, which proved attractive to composers of the day as an alternative to creating electronic works by laboriously splicing together sounds recorded on magnetic tape. The synthesizer had four-note variable polyphony, in addition to twelve fixed-tone oscillators and a white noise generator. It output sound to a synchronized record lathe; (Note: 1950 early electronic synthesizer: 'This is music with a strictly electronic beat'. YouTube. Clips & Footage. "Electronic Music Synthesizer, 'No instruments necessary'! "This is music with a strictly electronic beat". Man demonstrates synthesizer, bit of an anticlimax as it plays 'Camptown Races'.") the resulting recording would then be compared against the punched-paper score, and the process would be repeated until the desired results were obtained.

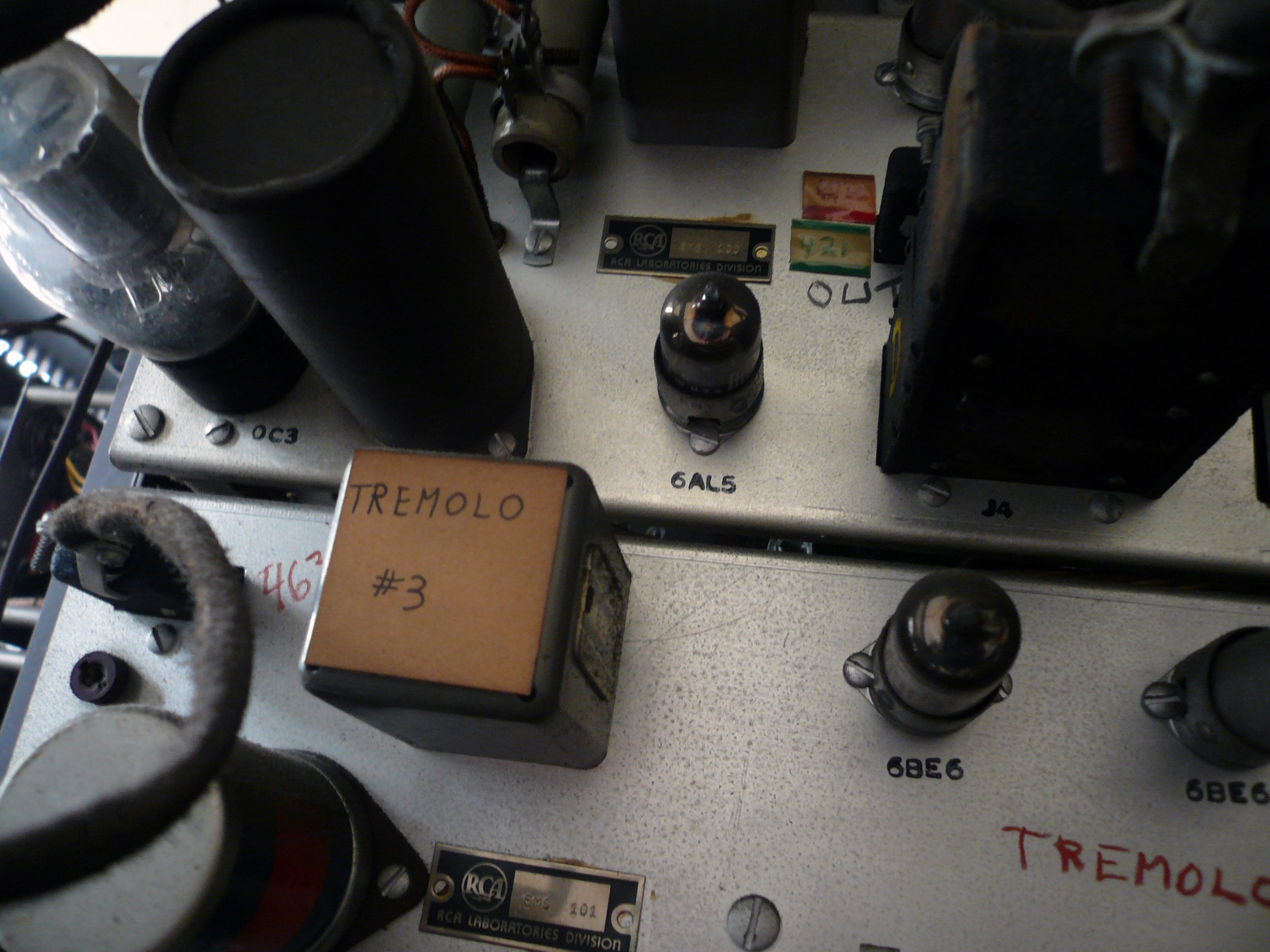
Close-up of the synthesizer

The sequencer was of particular attraction to composers writing serial music with a high degree of precision. The RCA was cited by composers including Milton Babbitt as contributing to a rise of musical complexity, because it allowed them the freedom to write music that would be impractical, if not impossible, to perform on acoustic instruments. The allure of precision as a mark of aesthetic progress generated high expectations for the Mark II, and contributed to the increased awareness of electronic music as an art form. An album featuring the instrument and its capabilities was issued by RCA (LM-1922) in 1955.

The synthesizer was difficult to configure, requiring extensive configuration prior to running a score. Little attempt was made to teach composition on the synthesizer, and few besides the designers at RCA and the engineering staff at Columbia who maintained it were proficient users. Babbitt (Note: Various (2005). OHM+: The Early Gurus Of Electronic Music (DVD). US: Ellipsis Arts. DVD 3694. Babbitt describes the acquisition and use of the machine in an interview segment.) is the composer most often associated with the synthesizer, and was its most prominent advocate. His works Vision and Prayer and Philomel both feature the RCA, as does Charles Wuorinen's 1970 Pulitzer-winning piece Time's Encomium.

The synthesizer quickly became obsolete, having been surpassed in the mid-1960s by more reliable and affordable solid-state synthesizers offered by Buchla and Moog. It was prohibitively expensive to replicate, and an RCA Mark III, though conceived by Belar and Olsen, was never constructed. As RCA chose not to stay in the synthesizer business, Columbia purchased enough spare parts for the Mark II to build two duplicates. The synthesizer eventually fell into disrepair; the last composer to get any sound out of it was R. Luke DuBois, who used it for a brief piece on the Freight Elevator Quartet's Jungle Album in 1997. The non-functional synthesizer remains housed at the Columbia University Computer Music Center.

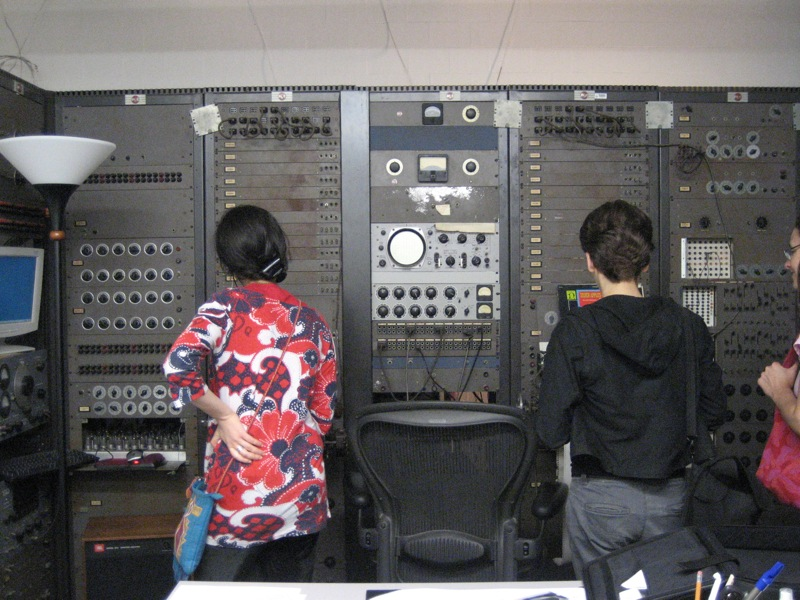
The synthesizer in 2007

== Bibliography ==
Overall

- Olson, Harry Ferdinand (1967). "Electronic Music". Music, Physics and Engineering. Courier Corporation. pp. 408–448. ISBN 978-0-486-21769-7.
  See "D. Description of an Electronic Music Composing Machine Employing a Random Probability System" for Olson-Belar composing machine (c.1950), and "10.4.RCA ELECTRONIC MUSIC SYNTHESIZER" for RCA Mark I (c.1955) & Mark II (c.1958).
- Holmes, Thom (2012). "Early Synthesizers and Experimenters". Electronic and Experimental Music: Technology, Music, and Culture (4th ed.). Routledge. pp. 176–190. ISBN 978-1-136-46895-7.
  See also excerption of pp. 142–157 from the 3rd ed. in 2008 (ISBN 978-0-415-95781-6).

Olson-Belar composing machine (circa 1950)

- US application 2855816, Harry F. Olson; Belar Herbert, "Music Synthesizer", published October 14, 1957, assigned to RCA Corp. (filed December 26, 1951)
- Olson, Harry F. (1952). Musical Engineering. New York: McGraw-Hill.
  Note: source of "Figure 6.1 Schematic for the Olson-Belar composing machine ..." on Holmes 2012, p. 179.

RCA Electronic Music Synthesizer, Mark I (circa 1955)

- Olson, Harry F.; Belar, Herbert (May 1955). "Electronic Music Synthesizer". Journal of the Acoustical Society of America. 27 (3): 595–612. Bibcode:1955ASAJ...27..595O. doi:10.1121/1.1907975. Archived from the original (reprint) on 2013-10-16. "The electronic music synthesizer is a machine that produces music from a coded record. The coded record, is produced by a musician, musical engineer, or composer with a fundamental understanding of the composition of sound. The electronic music synthesizer provides means for the production of a tone with any frequency, intensity, growth, duration, decay, portamento, timbre, vibrato, and variation. If these properties of a tone are specified, the tone can be completely described. ..."
  Note: a paper about RCA Electronic Music Synthesizer, also known as Mark I, which was unveiled in 1955 and housed at Princeton University (according to Holmes 2012, pp. 179).

RCA Mark II Electronic Music Synthesizer (circa 1958)

- Olson, Harry F.; Belar, Herbert (1961). "Aid to music composition employing a random probability system". Journal of the Acoustical Society of America. 33 (9): 1163. Bibcode:1961ASAJ...33.1163O. doi:10.1121/1.1908937.

Computer compositions

- Hiller, LeJaren (1970). "Music composed with computers—a historical survey". In Harry B. Lincoln (ed.). The Computer and Music. Ithaca, N.Y.: Cornell University Press. pp. 42–96. ISBN 9780801405501.
  Note: a brief summary of work by Olson and Belar is given, and their "composing machine" is described as a prototype of RCA Electronic Music Synthesizers. (according to Lincoln 1972, p. 75).
- Lincoln, Harry B. (1972). "Uses of the Computer in Music Composition and Research". In Morris Rubinoff (ed.). Advances in Computers. Vol. 12. Academic Press. pp. 73–114. ISBN 978-0-08-056644-3.
