= Political poetry =

Poetic forms

Political poetry brings together politics and poetry. According to "The Politics of Poetry" by David Orr, poetry and politics connect through expression and feeling, although both of them are matters of persuasion. Political poetry connects to people's feelings, and politics connects to current events. Poetry can also make political references and have real effects on the perception of politics.

Political poetry can impact readers because both politics and poetry express views, with political poetry often defined as being: "a specific political situation; rooted in an identifiable political philosophy; addressing a particular political actor; written in language that can be understood and appreciated by its intended audience; and finally, offered in a public forum where it can have maximum persuasive effect".

Political poetry has existed from the earliest times, including the Roman, Horace ( 65 BC – 8 BC).

== Can poetry be political? ==
Some critics argue that political poetry can not exist, stating that politics do not belong with and can not be incorporated with traditional definitions of poetry. One of the most vivid examples of this comes from a 1968 essay, "Studies in English Literature: Restoration and Eighteenth Century", written by A.L. French. In this work, French provides criticism of the influential 17th century poet John Dryden's work, claiming that the majority of praise Dryden receives is due to his political messages rather than the quality of his poetry, which French believes is mediocre. For example, French believes Dryden relies too heavily on excessive allusion to get his messages and themes across; French describes Dryden's work and "his treatment of the body politic in the epic simile". French's argument reveals the inherent difficulty of political poetry: the attempt to incorporate the literal (politics), can destroy the fanciful and imaginary qualities that make poetry what it is.

== Britain ==
During the eighteenth century the Augustan poets, such as Dryden and Pope wrote political poetry.

=== Working Class Political Poetry ===
Working-class women poetry describes the works of the voices behind the machinery and factories of the Victorian era. Critic Megan Timney argues that working-class women poets engaged with nineteenth century class politics and their simple use of diction and themes resonated with. This poetry calls for equality in the workplace, fair compensation and the improvement of working conditions. Meagan Timney examines how working-class women of the Victorian era in Britain were deemed unimportant or unrecognized in comparison to working-class males. As a result of this injustice, many female poets from this time period did not receive the proper recognition they deserved. Many women authors did not receive credit for their works since it was hard to trace an author to her work during this time. Only recently has their history been discovered. Timney argues that working-class women poets engaged with nineteenth century class politics and their simple use of diction and themes resonated with Chartist poetry. In works written by Mary Hutton, she incorporated issues of the day during the 1830s and 1840s by politicizing both gender and class while carefully walking a line of legislative changes and political revolution. Other than Mary Hutton, there are other examples of poetry by other working-class women during the late 1800s through the early 1900s. Besides Hutton, there were also others who had their own stance on the treatment of the working-class. These women poets were helpful because of their influencing ideas for revolutionary change and the commitment to justice. Hutton, a Chartist Poet, focused on political subjects and observed the workings of justice and how women of the working class were treated. Working-class women often were denied access to the reforms of the Chartist movement thus denied the right to fight for their worker's rights. Current research of Mary Hutton has opened doors for further research on female working poets like Hutton to be credited as equal to other working class writers. The importance of this poetry highlights the specifics of the working class during this time period, and how work matters to society.

== Irish political poetry ==
In the 1840s political poetry was widely distributed in a newspaper called The Nation. This was intended to spread nationalism across Ireland. In 1843 some of the major contributors of the newspaper were Thomas Davis, Charles Gavan Duffy, and John Blake Dillon. They produced an anthology of poetry titled The Spirit of the Nation, which consisted of politicised poetry with heavy nationalistic tones and motives, much like the newspaper.

The contemporary Irish critic and poet Eavan Boland argues that the act of a woman writing poetry in Ireland is a political act in itself due to the traditional exclusion from the art. The prolific Irish poet Nuala Ni Dhomhnaill asserted, "the image of women in the national tradition is a very real dragon that every Irish woman poet has to fight every time she opens her door". The political poem's roots in Ireland are very male centric, both in who was writing it and also the subject matter. Women often had no voice or were objectified, and put into the traditional housewife role in Ireland's poetic history. Political Poetry was widespread across Ireland in the mid 19th century: "The national and the feminine [was] frequently mixed in the rhetoric of the newspaper" (Boland). This association repressed the female voice in the poetry of Ireland. Since then there have been many successful female political poets from Ireland.

== Australian Political Poetry ==
Australian political poetry itself is not too different from other countries’ political poems in writing style; however, Australian political poetry mostly focuses on the impacts of colonialisation. Australian political poetry, especially those written by Indigenous Australians, focused on a myriad of issues, including, but not limited to “deaths in custody, high infant mortality rates, low life expectancy, suicide, sexual violence against women and children, child removal, poverty, and land rights,” particularly in regard to how these results of colonisation affects Aboriginal people.

Poet Oodgeroo Noonuccal was the first Aboriginal Australian to publish a book of poetry in 1964. Her political poetry was made to strike at “white ego” as to not let them forget the “atrocities committed in theft of this land.”

Much of Noonuccal's poetry alludes to and invalidates the common stereotypes and misconceptions about Aboriginal people. The poem "We Are Going" seems to be aimed at discrediting the ‘doomed race’ theory, and also contains common themes in Noonuccal’s—and other Indigenous writers’—political poems, by displaying grief, nature, spirituality, Australian slang and pieces of an Aboriginal language.

== Mexican women's poetry ==
Critic Christopher Conway argues that in the disarray of the U.S.-Mexican War of 1846-1848, many Mexican writers recognized that the losses their country was facing were due to the disconnection among their people. Writers responded to this in a number of ways, but most notably through a new dimension of women's poetry. Centralists and Federalists did not stand together which ultimately mounted to the countries losses, and writers saw that the country needed national unity.

Mexican female poets utilized poetry as a way to speak out about the war without being criticized or ignored because of their gender. Women during the U.S.-Mexican War were marginalized and could not hold high political positions. In order to be heard, they created poems and literature. Women poets would go on and form a "sisterhood" of poets that stood up and collectively spoke out against Mexico's government and its failures.

Writing poetry brought empowerment to Mexican women during the US- Mexican war 1. These poets utilized poetry as an approach to voice their feelings in a way where they could feel comfortable without the direct judgement from public figures as well as the men in their lives. Conway explains that "... women began to represent and share their experiences through poetry, thereby carving out space for their voice to be heard by the educated women who constituted the primary readership of literary print material in Mexico..." 1 During the war, Mexican women took on many important roles like republican spies, smugglers, nurses, and conspirators. But as the war went on, the European notion that women belonged at home started to take over and the term of "angel de hogar" (angel of the hearth) became a strong belief. Women were denied education: "... we find a staged dialog between various men and women at a tertulia over the merits of the prospectus of the magazine, which calls for the education of women 'Some argue against women's education, seeing it as a threat to men, whereas others disagree, arguing that that women need to be educated to strengthen marriage and motherhood' (Gondra 1841,15)" 1. Although women had many important roles during the US-Mexican war, men and some women alike feared that women with education would become a threat to the "masculine sphere of politics".

== American ==
=== History ===
American political poetry arguably dates back to the turn of the century. One of the first political poems was written in 1930 by Uri Zvi Grinberg, a poem titled "I Hate the Peace of Those who Surrender". "The East of the Jordan", by Zeev Jabotinsky, is another poem; a more modern poetry book is Democracy in Contemporary U.S. Women's Poetry written by Nicky Marsh; political poetry originates from all around the world, however, it is viewed with distinctive variations. Through the reader's point of view, political poetry conveys and expresses political aspects which then shapes how it is read, "Poetry might be perceived as political by its audience even if the writer did not mean to convey a political message or ideas, values, praise, or criticism." Poetry uses emotion to convey messages that poets to get across, incorporating the use of culture and politics. Politics, however, has always been heavily involved with complex issues that cannot be solved with emotion alone. John F Kennedy, the 35th president, linked poetry to politics when he said: "If more politicians knew poetry, and more poets knew politics, I am convinced the world would be a better place in which to live." The effectiveness of poetry draws from reader experience and emotion; politics, however, is mostly used to convince their audience. Political poetry incorporates these two ideas together, creating something that both influences the audience and convinces them as to the main idea of the poem. William Butler Yeats, an Irish senator in 1922, believed that "rhetoric stems from our confrontations with others while poetry stems from our confrontations with ourselves".

=== American Indian political poetry ===
In "Surviving the War by Singing the Blues: The Contemporary Ethos of American Indian Poetry", author and critic Rebecca Tsosie argues that the creation of American Indian political poetry in the 1890s was strongly inspired by the struggles and oppression American Indians faced. American Indian Political Poetry consists of poetry and music written by politically motivated American Indians in order to raise awareness and call for change. Many poets, such as John Trudell and Wendy Rose, represent the hardships that American Indians face in their poetry to "ignite and create a unified, spiritual flame". In the mid to late 1980s, influential poets and musicians, such as John Trudell and Jesse Ed Davis, created musical poems about American Indian hardships. Although American Indian political poetry originated in the 1890s, "numerous Indian poets such as Wendy Rose, Paula Gunn Allen, Leslie Silko, Philip Minthorn, and Maurice Kelly" continue to write political poetry in the present day. The messages each artist sends are relayed through the use of poetry and traditional music. The poetry and music written by many Indian poets expose the tragic events American Indians experienced, such as the fight to obtain clean water (issues that are not often talked about). Tsosie asserts "contemporary Indian poets... utilize the strength of their traditional past to address the critical issues of present and future". Many of the struggles faced by American Indians, such as being generalized as being one group rather than being acknowledged as distinct groups, are caused by Western stereotypes. American Indian poets present ideas to deal and cope with the unjust ways they were treated. Tsosie argues "Ward Churchill... notes a central continuity between the 19th century Ghost Dance vision and the contemporary politically motivated poetry of many American Indians". The purpose of the Ghost Dance was for American Indians to be able to challenge the injustices and repression that occurred during this time.

Poetry has been used to criticize events in America, calling the government into question or being used to show the viewpoint of citizens. One example of this is the government's handling of Hurricane Katrina. Hurricane Katrina was a natural disaster which devastated the Gulf Coast region and many people lost their homes and families to both the storm and subsequent man-made disaster. In, "Hip Hop as Disaster Recovery in the Katrina Diaspora", Zenia Kish demonstrates the political role that hip hop played in an effort to portray a positive view of the residents that were criticized and labeled as "refugees" during hurricane Katrina. The music created after Hurricane Katrina demonstrated how influential it can be by "... giving a voice to 'those who are losing their own.'" The music that was created in the aftermath of Hurricane Katrina was a way to express the injustices of treatment and media representation. Many African-Americans who had just lost their homes and loved ones were being labeled as refugees instead of disenfranchised victims who lost their housing. This hip hop music movement is similar to the birth of the blues music genre. These types of music were created in response to a natural disaster and to represent how African-American and other minority cultures had been affected. This also gave hip hop artists motivation to criticize the mainstream media as well as the U.S. government and FEMA for the lack of support for the victims. By using musical and lyrical forms of poetry, artists brought awareness to survivors that were mislabeled as refugees. Local artists Mia X and 5th Ward Weebie both used the platform of hip hop to express the difficulties their community was experiencing in the aftermath of Katrina. More popular and mainstream artists such as Jay-Z and Kanye West used this platform to speak out against the prejudice against those affected by hurricane Katrina. A notable example of criticism comes from an off-the-script speech during A Concert for Hurricane Relief where Kanye West candidly exposed double standards in the media when it came to the ethnicity of looters.

=== Chicano political poetry ===
Chicano political poetry thematizes Mexican-American empowerment and addresses inequality. According to critic Adolfo Ortega: "Chicano poetry [was] an aesthetic medium of considerable impact on the [Chicano] Movement...[it] helped give vision to the Movement; its power loomed early." In mid-century America, many Mexican-Americans were disenfranchised and didn't have the same rights as white Americans. In 1965, Corky Gonzalez (a Chicano poet) assembled a Chicano youth conference attended by many social activists and poets. This gathering led many young and creative artists to organize to advocate for increased social, political, and economic rights. The Chicano movement used poetry to address these issues to Americans inside and outside the mainstream socio-political establishment. Adolfo Ortega, a famous Mexican-American political poet, in 1965 addressed the Chicano Movement, saying: "The Chicano Movement gave birth to a cultural consciousness that resulted in an explosion of artistic talent, poets, novelists, painters, sculptors, and musicians set out to recapture the Chicano world-vision." One example of Chicano political poetry is the poet Alurista, who wrote in bilingual verse to call for equality:

raza ain 't you tired
raza ain't you tired
of the nagging
tell the man
"the cosa es mia [the thing is mine]
and i ain't taking a number this time
i won't wait in line
this time i come in bailando [dancing]
a recoger mi cosa [to pick up my thing]
the man, he nagging?

=== Asian American political poetry ===
Asian American writers must often confront racial bias that seeks to diminish their work. Dorothy Wang argues that there is a bias against Asian-American writers because of their race. Wang states that the: "marginalization of Asian American poetry is, arguably, a synecdochic reflection of the larger state of poetry in a capitalist society – poets tend not to write best sellers and poetry has no use-value – yet the erasure of poetry within literary purviews bespeaks a more profound and troubling fundamental misapprehension within American literary (and racial) ideologies: the (mis)reading, even if mostly unconscious, of the category of 'Asian American poetry' as oxymoronic, a contradiction in terms, one that pits the sociopolitical (read: racial) against the aesthetic (the formal, the "purely" literary) in a false binary." The lack of attention to race in poetry can cause Asian American's contribution to the poetic world to become almost nonexistent. Asian American literature has been taught in English departments across the country only for the past few decades and much of it has third-class status. Many American minority poets were not recognized for their poetry. For example, the 2008 PMLA "The New Lyric Studies" and in the"Poetry and Society" were two awards where minority poets were not acknowledged for their poems.

The multicultural Asian American movement in the 1960s and 1979s strived to include Asian American poets and artists into the mainstream media. Asian American poets wrote embracing the concept of"yellow power" similar to the"black power" movement, that would help them rise to be a larger part of the American poetic scene. They searched to express themselves on a larger media base in order to erase any racial profiling that comes along with their appearance. They wanted to be seen as normal American writers, not ethnic writers.

Mei-mei Berssenbrugge (b. 1947) is an Asian American political poet who came to the United States of America from Beijing at the age of one. Berssenbrugge identifies herself as a racially minoritized biracial poet in the language of her poetry. She wants to be seen as an American poet, where her racial profile is overlooked so that when people read her work, she is seen as an American writer and not an Asian one, a political choice.

In "Fog", Berssenbrugge relatives are crossing a long bridge because of how long it will take for them to finally be accepted into society as normal Americans. The following two lines are from "Fog": "It has no shape or color that is stable, as if I had fallen asleep and a long bridge / appeared, where my relatives are like companions crossing a bridge." Her critique of racial identity tends to be indirect; however, as Berssenbrugge mentioned in a 2006 interview, "I try to expand a field by dissolving polarities or dissolving the borders from one thing and another." Therefore, her presentation of race and racial identity are "not marginal to her poetry but central to her project of desiring to dematerialize whatever...keeps states of being and of nature separate." She uses her understanding of the world to combine two, unlike entities into a much larger picture.

Another example of politics in Asian American poetry is in "Chinaman, Laundryman" (1928) written by H. T. Tsiang (1899–1971):

My skin is yellow,
Does my yellow skin color the clothes?
Why do you pay me less
For the same work

Tsiang recognizes the inequalities faced by Asian Americans as they try to root themselves in America. Unlike Berssenbrugge, Tsiang directly mentions his skin color in his poem, and he works for race equality improvements for people of color.

While some Asian American poets tried to hide their race, others did not. Wang concludes that "those who were later to be called 'Asian American' were, from the very beginning, both political (in the broadest sense) and formal, aesthetically self-conscious – never delinked from the social and historical contexts of their making and of the poets' formations".

=== South Asian American political hip hop lyrics ===
African Americans and South Asian Americans share a social connection in the United States: they both have diasporic roots. Sharma argues that South Asians in the United States utilize hip hop lyrics to display solidarity with African Americans, sharing the status of racialized minorities in the United States. South Asian hip hop artists also advance a social justice agenda that everyone could benefit from. These South Asian hip hop artists are also known as Desi artists (plural, Desis). Desi artists recognize the political potency and relevance of hip hop to promote social change: "Hip hop is a powerful lens through which to examine Asian/Black relations not only because of its enormous popularity as a global form but also because hip hop culture is explicit about race, difference, inequality, and power". In the 1980s and 1990s Desi artists were influenced by the messages in black rap music and began to write lyrics that challenged problems South Asian faced as they were adjusting to their new cities and being first and second generation South Asians in the United States. Desis artists hip hop lyrics serve to: "Blu[r] the line between art and politics... cro[ss] racial, class, and national boundaries and is an extension of the racialized political identities that they forge through hip hop". D'Lo is one of the more popular South Asian American hip hop artists and is at the forefront of social change within his community. In his performance piece "Eyes Closed In America", on resistance to discrimination:

... Behind eyes closed we CAN'T be blinded no more
Envisioning a new world for us all
Where poor ain't a word no more
Where
All the colors of races would be revered as gold
Where class only means the school you go
Where
The only wars would be against discrimination
Where there's free education...

Thus, Desi artists approach hip hop as an extension of their social activists work of being political while helping to build the community they live in.

=== American political slam poetry ===
Critic Susan Somers-Willett asserts that slam poetry began between November 1984 and July 1986, in the Green Mill Jazz Club in Chicago. Slam poetry is a type of "political complaint" and protest that uses identity and other forms to protest oppression. Slam poets and audiences see slam poetry not only as literary or performative, but also as a political event. Somers-Willett argues that: "poems that make an empowered declaration of marginalized identity and individuality are a staple of one's slam repertoire." Race, gender and sexuality are all factors that affect poets and the message of their work. Slam poets work is an embodiment of their identity and it breaks the homogeneity of traditional poetry structure. But, a poet is not bound to a certain identity based on their culture, sexuality, or race, although many do use identity. Slam poetry's main goals is to express authenticity of identity to its audience. By this, poets will create a genuine and intimate connection with the audience through their identity based experience. Slam poetry revolutionizes of traditional forms of poetry. Slam poetry ranges from comical poems to extremely serious work about racism, sexual identity, violence, and personal struggles with life; slam poetry is the outlet a lot of writers use to express themselves. Many poets write from a "I" stand point where in their poems they describe events that has happened to them personally whether it be a positive or negative experience. "Inhabiting the space where the "I" of the page translates quite seamlessly to the "I" of the stage, the author comes to embody declarations about personal experience in performance." An example of authors using "I" would be Ragan Fox, who wrote To be Straight: "I want to be straight because sometimes being gay is just too difficult." Authors try to reach out to their audience by relating what they say in their poems to how the audience might have felt but never had the courage to say. There are also different ways to perform poetry. Patricia Smith, an African American poet, performed a poem in the voice of a white male skinhead. This shows the opposing party explaining to the audience the hatred and what is going through their minds. Slam poetry can come in various forms, but is a tool that can get a poetic argument across to those who listen.

"The Cultural Politics of Slam Poetry" by Susan B.A. Somers-Willett analyzes different poets and their work. Using poems such as "Thick" by Sonya Renee, "Tongue Tactics" by Mayda Del Valle, and "To Be Straight" by Regan Fox, Somers breaks down how each poet's work is an embodiment of themselves and their individual emotions and struggles. Somers also claims that, "poems that make an empowered declaration of marginalized identity and individuality are a staple of one's slam repertoire". A poet's work most often aims for authenticity and that in the work itself, the "I" is a reference to the poet. Slam poetry as a literary form and performance originates from Chicago at the Green Mill Jazz Club in 1986 but was first performed less popularly in 1984 around southern U.S. Regardless of its origins in the U.S. slam poetry can be found in many different parts of the world, Somers reinforces the idea that slam poetry differs for each culture, sexuality, and race; each offering a different perspective and worldview.

=== Tupac Shakur's political lyrical content ===
Karin L. Stanford argues that Tupac Shakur wrote political lyrics: "Tupac's lyrics underscore his refusal to accept economic inequality and inadequate employment opportunities. He also continues his attack on patriotic symbolism...Tupac's life and political advocacy prove that hip hop music and activism are not mutually exclusive....Tupac's political work reveals his aspiration for social change." Tupac's music also focused on civil rights and oppression to minorities. For example, in his lyrics he criticizes Americans who "pledge allegiance to a flag that neglects us Honor a man that who refuses to respect us Emancipation, Proclamation, Please! Ni*ga just said that to save the nation These are lies and we all accepted..." This refers back to the revolutionary war when colonists promised African slaves that they would abolish slavery if they aided them in the war. This also shows the struggles that African Americans had to endure throughout history to get to where they are today.

According to Stanford: "Although Tupac's discourse was not framed in traditional revolutionary nationalist rhetoric, his political associations, use of language, public statements, and lyrical content suggest that he identified with Revolutionary Nationalism." In the poem "How Can We Be Free", Shakur's lyrics give readers a sense of racism and makes a call for change.

Sometimes I wonder about this race
Because we must be blind as hell
2 think we live in equality
While Nelson Mandela rots in a jail cell
Where the shores of Howard Beach
Are full of Afrikan corpses
And those that do live 2 be 18
Bumrush 2 join the Armed Forces
This so called "Home of the Brave"
Why isn't anybody Backing us up!
When they c these crooked a? Redneck cops
Constantly Jacking us up
Now I bet some punk will say I'm racist
I can tell by the way you smile at me
Then I remember George Jackson, Huey Newton
And Geronimo 2 hell with Lady Liberty

== Salvadoran women political poetry ==
In El Salvador "since 1979, 75,000 Salvadorans have died in politically related violence...over two million live in extreme poverty". During the war women experienced a disproportionate impact. Many of these women have been subjected to rape and other forms of sexual torture by military men. Salvadoran women used poetry to write about this violence. "Salvadoran women's political poetry moves not from language to idea to action...but rather from action and ideas to language." DeShazer claims that "poetry is no luxury but instead provides essential, rigorous witness: to a consistently underreported war against the salvadoran people by the US and Salvadoran governments". Mary DeShazer claims that "Exiled poet Liliam Jimenez's bitter address to Salvadoran soldiers offers a searing indictment of fifty years of military atrocities and employs apocalyptic revenge motifs, fantasies of retributive violence." Women in El Salvador began to collectively stand together to describe their suffering.

According to author Zoe Anglesey: "Our poetry will express our total range of feelings: from Outrage to Reconciliation. "The voices of less famous women also had a crucial place in the resistance movement and the building of a female literary tradition. Zoe Anglesey writes about how to move on from war: "Young women and men of the future / for you it's waiting / the final moment of transition / for you / the day of infinite purple is reserved / the triumph coppery from our blood / for you will be / the bread and soil of our dreams / the all-night worry of our struggles/ the honey and water of our wounds."

== Alevi political poetry ==
Alevi poetry is a type of political poetry. Most (proto) Alevi Poetry deals with discrimination and injustice in society. Alevi poetry has a long tradition of dealing with political injustice and discrimination, going back to the 16th century. During the 1960s and 1970s, there was a very strong division between Turkey nationalist and leftist ideologies. In contrast, the Alevis sided themselves with the left because they were able to have more religious freedom.

Alevi poetry is best exemplified in Pir Sultan Abdal's poems. Some poems mix religious and political subjects such as poems themed around the Turkish War of Independence or the social unrest of the 1960–70s. One example of this is the poem "The Epos of the Liberation" about the War of Independence written by Adil Ali Atalay:

It is grievous to be a prisoner in my own country,
My mother cried out, did you hear it, sister?
The Mahdi appeared and put the crown on his head,
All together they were hurrying as if a revolution had
broken out.
We were invincible, we became one and complete,
We were undividable, we were together with Ata[türk],
Not as captives, if we had died we would have been free,
The brave men said [this is] the time and place, and [they]
became heroes

This excerpt shows some structure of a typical Alevi poetry. Alevi culture is an oral culture by which their songs, stories, and poems are orally transmitted, remembered and interpreted. Poems are categorized as Alevi when the author see themselves as Alevi and when Alevi symbols and topics are referred to. The reciter of these poems are called asiks (also known as ozan). The term asik literally means "the one in love [with God]" in Turkish and is part of the heritage of popular Turkish culture. This term has been used since the fifteenth century and derives from Islamic mystical traditions. Asiks usually play a saz (a long-necked lute) as they sing the poems. Askis interprets poems of other asiks as well as their own. According to Dressler, their work includes "epic tales, songs of love and devotion, religious hymns, as well as social and political critiques". Epic tales are combined with knowledge of popular Sufism. One of the primary functions of the asik is to spread the Alevis' mystical knowledge and epic traditions by "chanting poems". If there had been no asik institution, Alevi traditions could have disappeared in (proto) Alevism. An asik is can spread poems and also write new ones, which can give him the "creative power to reinterpret the tradition". Traditionally, this is made by the asik being initiated. That can be done by a recognized asik, by a departed asik in a dream, by a saint (Alevi saint) or by God.

Religious themes of asik poetry are made up of devotion for twelve Imams also admired by the Twelver-Shia. Asik tradition is mostly practiced on the countryside and commonly the audience is peasants. Scenes for performances were private homes or coffeehouses. Today, some publishes poems as well.

One reason this political poetry is written is because it's a response to the following event:

On June 2, 1993, in the city of Sivas about thirty-five Alevi people were killed in a hotel fire by the Sunnis. This caused Alevism to go through a process of religious reorientation. Alevi had a constant chain on suffering, due to the Sivas event. The leftists ended up losing their importance and ended up becoming marginalized.

== Nicaraguan political poetry ==
Nicaraguans facing political oppression used political poetry to oppose the Somoza regime dictatorship in 1978. There were several significance poets who wrote political poetry and spoke out against the grime by using their influence within the community to unite everyone and make a call for action. Political poetry served as a way for the people of Nicaragua to oppose and advocate for their political rights, to be treated fairly and to have freedom to express themselves without fearing that the regime would retaliate. Marc Zimmerman and Ellen Banberger in their article: "Poetry & Politics in Nicaragua", claim that: "Against U.S. intervention and the Somoza dictatorship, poetry and poeticized political discourse have served as dominant vehicle for ideological expression and development." Zimmerman and Banberger list poets who spoke against Somoza including Ernesto Castillo, a young poet determined to share the truth. His poems helped inspire young university students and women to oppose the government that mistreated them and tore their country apart. In his poem "In this Country", Castillo talks about his generation's struggles:

"But we were born in Nicaragua

In this country,

We write each other

Letters and poetry,"

Not about love,

But about struggle..."

== Kimondo-Kenyan form ==
Kimondo is a form of Kenyan political poetry that often uses satirical elements. Politicians hire poets to write poems that praise them directly while also alluding to the corruptness of the opposer. Athman Lali Omar of Lamu—a poet critic—declares, "Kimondo is lightning and it is an attack". Kimondo is a Swahili word which means meteor or "satan's firebrand". This style of poetry is used as direct an attack on politicians. The poet's knowledge of particular politicians helps promote their favorable leader, while simultaneously criticizing the opponent.

While kimondo is an older tradition, the modern style of kimondo poetry was established in the late nineteenth century by the Swahili people of the Lamu East Constituency of Kenya on the island of Lamu, located on the northern coast of Kenya, Africa. The establishing of European institutions is the primary cause for the contemporary kimondo style. Europeans left a legacy of political elections, thus starting a style of campaigning that utilizes poetry for campaign electioneering.

Political election campaigning will at times be conducted through kimondo in order to provide critique of an opponent's competing points of view. This form of political poetry has been written out of satire by popular Kenyan poets in the past who are then hired by parliamentary to present a poem intended for attack and rebuttal.

198. Alipokipata kiti ---- When he was elected M.P.,

akipita kwa matiti, ---- he used to walk with a strut,

na kuwambia umati ---- and used to tell the electorate

Yeo kwenu nimekuja. ---- "Today, I have got round to you!"

199. Akenda kwa Mdhihiri, ---- He then went up to Mdhihiri,

kamtukana vizuri ---- and insulted him roundly!

huku akiyifahiri, ---- And then went on vaunting, saying,

Basi bado nakwambia. ---- "And this is just the beginning!"

200. Na siku alosimama ---- And there is the day he stood up

mbele ya wengi kauma ---- before a large crowd

kwa bayana akasema ---- and said distinctly

Kiti ni changu sikia. ---- "This seat is mine you understand?"

201. Na hapo akatukana ---- And here too he was abusive.

yaso maana tanena ---- I shall tell you of his unspeakable words,

watu wafahamu sana ---- so that people may understand very well

yote alotangazia. ---- all that he blurted around the place.

The purpose of this poem was to display that Bwana Mzamil (the opposer of Bwana Madhubuti) believed he was indispensable, persuading listeners that he was a bad politician. Kimondo poetry will go back and forth, with the speakers representing their respective sides of the political parties. In these kimondo poems, Madhubuti's poet criticizes Mzamil, and vice versa.

== In the Post-Mao era of China ==
Political poetry in the Post-Mao period (1976–1989) was initially used to revere political figures but evolved into a means for protest against communism throughout China. After the death of China's communist leader Mao Zedong, poets chose to write poetry that "[eulogized] the heroes that fought against the gang of four" (Shiao 1983). Poets also chose to use martyrs who had died protesting against China's government, as their subjects for poetry. A notable martyr of the time was Zhang Zhixin who, like many other martyrs, died for her anti-government views.

The historical events that lead to the Post-Mao era was the death of China's leader, Mao Zedong. China's government was experiencing a power struggle that ended once Deng Xiaoping came into power. His reign resulted in social conflicts and lead to the Tienanmen Square Protests.

The influence that poetry had in China lead to its evolution into a tool that freely "exposes the maladies in the political system" (Shiao 1983). Many critics pose the following questions "should literature serve politics?" (Shiao 1983) and "can the writer write about the dark side of society?" (Shiao 1983). The question of political content and poetic form is at the center of literature versus propaganda.

== Poems/poets A-Z ==
- Black Workers.: Hughes, Langston – Gives a theology about the body also leaves behind the bees, and the bees go out and do the work. while others take away from the bees and all they have done. Also noting that the horrible treatment would one day cease.
- World Peace: Athol Williams aka AE Ballakisten – describes how the politics of identity influences beliefs and behavior, and can ultimately lead to conflict. Redefining identity can lead to peace.
- Enemy: Hughes, Langston – Being a slave was like a living hell, and this poem shares the expression of the writer of how it would be nice to see the slave owners get what they deserve as the slave emerges from years of torment.
- Jerusalem: Blake, William – This poem talks about the holy land Jerusalem and how sacred it is. Also how they will fight to protect such a blessed land.
- Next To of Course God America: Cummings, E. E. – Commentary on blind patriotism and the glorification of death in battle.
- Open Letter to the South: Hughes, Langston – A treaty of peace in a sense, promoting unification instead of separation.
- عملية Operación Opération Operation 行动 Операция: Surani, Moez – Book-length poem collecting together the codenames of military operations by the 193 UN-member countries, from the founding of the UN in 1945 to 2006.
- Quiet Desperation: Portolano, Charles – The speaker of the poem is examining a boy on the train. Talking about his life and how great it was, and at the end he watches his flame slowly diminish.
- Reconciliation: Whitman, Walt – War taking the ones we love, and their heroic deeds of that day eventually forgotten in time, washed away by death and night.
- Updike, John: Born March 18, 1932, and American novelist, poet, and short story writer. Some of his works include: The Carpentered Hen, and Posthumous Endpoint.
- Vachel Lindsay: Born December 5, 1931, an American poet thought of to be the father of "singing poetry". Some of his works include: Abraham Lincoln Walks at Night, On the Garden Wall, and Why I voted the socialist ticket.

== See also ==
- American proletarian poetry movement
- Tony Harrison
- Hugh MacDiarmid
- Ezra Pound
- Proletarian literature
- Poetry § Satirical poetry
