= Judith Tick =

American musicologist (born 1943)

- Born: January 4, 1943; Winthrop, Massachusetts, US

Academic background
- Education: City University of New York

Academic work
- Discipline: Women in music; American music
- Institutions: Northeastern University

Judith Fay Tick (born January 4, 1943) is an American musicologist. Her scholarship focuses on women in music and American music, often in combination. Described as "an innovator in the field of musical biography", her publications include biographies on both Ruth Crawford Seeger and Ella Fitzgerald, as well as studies on Aaron Copland and Charles Ives.

== Life and career ==
Judith Fay Tick was born on January 4, 1943 in Winthrop, Massachusetts, US. She attended the City University of New York, studying with Barry S. Brook, Gilbert Chase, Daniel Heartz and H. Wiley Hitchcock, and receiving a PhD in 1979. Her dissertation was Towards a History of American Women Composers before 1870. Since 1986, Tick has taught at Northeastern University; she is now Professor Emerita there.

Her writings include the first biography of the modernist composer Ruth Crawford Seeger, which received both ASCAP's Deems Taylor Award and the Society for American Music's Irving R. Lowens Award. She co-edited Women Making Music: The Western Art Tradition, 1150-1950 (1986) with Jane M. Bowers. She was editor of Music in the USA: A Documentary Companion published in 2008 by Oxford University Press. In 2023, she published a biography of the jazz singer Ella Fitzgerald, after more than a decade of research.
