= Ellie Hisama =

Japanese-American music theorist

- Title: Dean, faculty of music, professor of music

Academic background
- Education: Queens College, City University of New York
- Thesis: Gender, Politics, and Modernist Music: Analyses of Five Compositions by Ruth Crawford (1901-1953) and Marion Bauer (1887-1955) (1996)

Academic work
- Discipline: Music theorist
- Sub-discipline: Gender, Sexuality, and Race in Music
- Institutions: CUNY - Brooklyn; Columbia University; University of Toronto

Ellie Hisama is a Japanese-American music theorist. She is a professor of music at the University of Toronto, where she served as dean of the faculty of music from 2021 to 2024. Hisama's work focuses on issues of gender, race, sexuality, and the sociology of music.

== Educational background ==
Hisama attended high school at Phillips Exeter Academy. She received her Bachelor of Arts degree in English from the University of Chicago in 1987, and her Bachelor of Music degree in violin from Queens College, City University of New York (CUNY) in 1989. In 1996, she completed her Ph.D. in music theory from CUNY with the dissertation topic, Gender, Politics, and Modernist Music: Analyses of Five Compositions by Ruth Crawford (1901-1953) and Marion Bauer (1887-1955). This dissertation won CUNY's Barry S. Brook Dissertation Award for outstanding dissertation of the year at CUNY.

== Professional career ==
Hisama was an associate professor of music at Brooklyn College, City University of New York from 1997 to 2005, in which capacity she also served as the third director of the H. Wiley Hitchcock Institute for Studies in American Music. In 2006, she joined the faculty of Columbia University as a professor in the theory and historical musicology areas. While at Columbia, Hisama served as director of graduate studies for the Institute for Research on Women, Gender, and Sexuality. Hisama was also the founding director of the workshop, "For the Daughters of Harlem: Working in Sound," a program to provide public school students an opportunity create sound projects on the Columbia campus. In 2020, she was an inaugural recipient of the Faculty Mentoring Award, which "recognizes senior faculty's work mentoring tenure-track and mid-career faculty." Hisama was named a professor emerita upon her departure from Columbia in 2021.

In 2021, Hisama was named dean of the faculty of music at the University of Toronto for a five year term. Her stated goals for the position included "leadership from the administrative side [on] diversity, equity, and inclusion." Hisama ended her "appointment as Dean of the Faculty of Music on December 31, 2024."

== Scholarship ==
Hisama's research focuses on issues of ethnicity, gender, sexuality, and the role of music in culture. Her doctoral dissertation focused on analysis from a feminist perspective of the music of two female American composers from the turn of the twentieth century, Ruth Crawford Seeger and Marion Bauer. More generally, her research includes close readings which attempt to situate analysis of music within the context of the composers' gender, politics, and social views..

In addition to scholarship on feminist topics, Hisama coedited a volume on Hip Hop studies, Critical Minded: New Approaches to Hip Hop Studies', with Evan Rapport. She has written extensively on issues of diversity and inclusion within the profession of music theory.

== Selected works ==
=== Books ===
- Gendering Musical Modernism: The Music of Ruth Crawford, Marion Bauer, and Miriam Gideon. Cambridge: Cambridge University Press, 2001.
- Critical Minded: New Approaches to Hip Hop Studies, co-edited with Evan Rapport. Brooklyn, N.Y.: Institute for Studies in American Music, 2005.
- Ruth Crawford Seeger’s Worlds: Innovation and Tradition in Twentieth-century American Music, co-edited with Ray Allen. Rochester: University of Rochester Press, 2007.

=== Articles ===
- "Postcolonialism on the Make: The Music of John Mellencamp, David Bowie, and John Zorn," in Reading Pop: Approaches to Textual Analysis in Popular Music, ed. Richard Middleton. Oxford: Oxford University Press, 2000, 329-46. Reprinted from Popular Music 12/2 (May 1993)
- “The Question of Climax in Ruth Crawford’s String Quartet, Mvt. 3,” in Concert Music, Rock, and Jazz Since 1945: Essays and Analytical Studies, ed. Elizabeth West Marvin and Richard Hermann. Rochester: University of Rochester Press, 1995, 285-312.
- “Voice, Race, and Sexuality in the Music of Joan Armatrading,” in Audible Traces: Gender, Identity, and Music, ed. Elaine Barkin and Lydia Hamessley, 115-32. Zürich: Carciofoli Verlagshaus, 1999.
- “Life Outside the Canon? A Walk on the Wild Side,” Music Theory Online 6.3 (2000)
- “Feminist Music Theory Into the Millennium: A Personal History,” in Feminisms at a Millennium, ed. Carolyn Allen and Judith A. Howard, 276-80. Chicago: University of Chicago Press, 2001. Reprinted from special millennial issue of Signs: Journal of Women in Culture and Society 25/4 (Summer 2000)
- “John Zorn and the Postmodern Condition,” in Locating East Asia in Western Art Music, ed. Yayoi Uno Everett and Frederick Lau, 72-84. Middletown: Wesleyan University Press, 2004.
- “‘We’re All Asian Really’: Hip Hop’s Afro-Asian Crossings,” in Critical Minded: New Approaches to Hip Hop Studies, edited by Ellie M. Hisama and Evan Rapport, 1-21. Brooklyn, N.Y.: Institute for Studies in American Music, 2005.
- “In Pursuit of a Proletarian Music: Ruth Crawford’s ‘Sacco, Vanzetti’,” in Ruth Crawford Seeger’s Worlds: Innovation and Tradition in Twentieth-century American Music, edited by Ray Allen and Ellie M. Hisama, 73-93. Rochester: University of Rochester Press, 2007.
- "“From L’Étranger to ‘Killing an Arab’: Representing the Other in a Cure Song,” in Expression in Pop-Rock Music: A Collection of Critical and Analytical Essays, ed. Walter Everett, 59-74. New York: Garland Press, 2000; 2nd edition published by Routledge, 2007.
- “Comment on AVANT’s interview with John Zorn,” AVANT: pismo awangardy filozoficzno-naukowej [AVANT: The Journal of the Philosophical-Interdisciplinary Avant-Garde, Torún, Poland] III, T/2012 (January–June, 2012). Translated into Polish.
- “The Ruth Crawford Seeger Sessions," Daedalus: the Journal of the American Academy of Arts & Sciences 142/4 (Fall 2013), 51-63.
- “DJ Kuttin Kandi: Performing Feminism,” American Music Review XLIII, no. 2 (Spring 2014),
- “‘Diving into the Earth’: Julius Eastman’s Musical Worlds,” in Rethinking Difference in Music Scholarship, ed. Olivia Bloechl, Jeffrey Kallberg, and Melanie Lowe, 260-86. Cambridge: Cambridge University Press, 2015.
- “Improvisation in Freestyle Rap,” Oxford Handbook of Critical Improvisation Studies, vol. 2, ed. Benjamin Piekut and George E. Lewis, 250-57. New York: Oxford University Press, 2016.
- “Considering Race and Ethnicity in the Music Theory Classroom,” in Norton Guide to Teaching Music Theory ed. Rachel Lumsden and Jeff Swinkin, 252-66. New York: W. W. Norton, 2018.
- “‘Blackness in a white void’: Dissonance and Ambiguity in Isaac Julien’s Multi-Screen Film Installations,” in Rethinking Difference in Gender, Sexuality, and Popular Music: Theory and Politics of Ambiguity, ed. Gavin Lee, 168-183. New York: Routledge, 2018.
- "A Feminist Staging of Britten's The Rape of Lucretia," Journal of the American Musicological Society 71/1 (April 2018), 237-43.
- “Power and Equity in the Academy: Change from Within,” Current Musicology, special issue Sounding the Break: Music Studies and the Political 102, special issue edited by Tom Wetmore (Spring 2018).
- “On seeing and hearing anew: On the Theatre of a Two-Headed Calf's Drum of the Waves of Horikawa,” Journal of the Association for the Study of the Arts of the Present 4/1 (2019).
- "Geri Allen and 'The Whole Feeling of the Connection'," Jazz & Culture 3, no. 2 (Fall 2020),
- "Getting to Count," Music Theory Spectrum 43, no. 2 (2021).
- “For the Daughters of Harlem: Bridging Campus and Community Through Sound” (co-authored with Lucie Vágnerová), in Sounding Together: Collaborative Perspectives on U.S. Music in the 21st Century, ed. Carol J. Oja and Charles Hiroshi Garrett (University of Michigan Press, 2021.)
- “‘Not yet accepted as singing’: Ruth Crawford’s ‘To an Angel’ from Chants for Women’s Chorus (1930),” in Analytical Studies of Music by Women Composers: Concert Music, 1900-1960, ed. Laurel Parsons and Brenda Ravenscroft, 111-132. New York: Oxford University Press, 2022.
- “Listening to Listening: A Response to Nina Eidsheim’s The Race of Sound.” In Kalfou: A Journal of Comparative and Relationship Ethnic Studies 9, no. 2 (Fall 2022).
- “Popular Culture: Cultural Activism and Musical Performance.” In A Cultural History of Western Music in the Modern Age, vol. 6, ed. William Cheng and Danielle Fosler-Lussier. London: Bloomsbury, 2023.
- “Which Voices? Acts of Inclusion in Music.” In Hidden Heartache, volume of writings accompanying recording by pianist Simone Keller. St. Gallen, Switzerland: Jungle Books, 2024.
