= The Hanging on Union Square =

1935 novel

The Hanging on Union Square: An American Epic is a novel by Chinese American author H.T. Tsiang, originally self-published in 1935. The story is about a man called "Mr. Nut" who sits in a cafeteria, and listens to the problems of the people around him. Mr. Nut himself is unemployed, however feels as though his condition is temporary and dreams of striking it rich. Throughout the story, the reader sees Mr. Nut transforming into a radical activist. The book shows multiple facets of the social strata within the streets of Greenwich Village. The first edition was self-published in 1935, after being rejected from numerous publishers. Tsiang places numerous rejection letters in the opening pages of the novel. True to Tsiang's radical aesthetic, the original copy does not show the title of the book, instead questioning what a book cover really is: “the cover of a book / is more of a book / than the book is a book.” The book was published in 2013 by Kaya Press, and edited by Floyd Cheung.

== Background ==
Hsi Tseng Tsiang (H.T. Tsiang) was born near Shanghai in 1899, and died in 1971 in Los Angeles. Tsiang is known as a poet, playwright, and novelist. In 1917, Tsiang was inspired by the Bolshevik Revolution led by Vladmir Lenin, and in 1926 attempted to migrate to the Soviet Union. After the failed migration, he entered the United States as a student and enrolled at Stanford University. He was involved with the Greenwich Village literary scene in the 1920s and 1930s, and self-published a number of books which he would hawk at downtown political meetings. H.T. Tsiang is also known for writing And China Has Hands (1937), which according to American cultural historian Michael Denning was, "repeatedly rejected by publishers (finally published in 1963)". A personal history of Tsiang appears in the 2013 publication of The Hanging on Union Square in the Chronology section.

== Critical response ==
"H.T. Tsiang’s satiric, quasi-experimental novel The Hanging on Union Square explores leftist politics in Depression-era New York – an era of union busting and food lines – in an ambitious style that combines humor-laced allegory with snatches of poetry, newspaper quotations, non sequiturs, and slogans. Back in print for the first time since it was originally self-published in 1935, Kaya’s new edition of the novel follows out-of-work protagonist Mr. Nut from a workers’ cafeteria to dinner clubs and sexual exploitation in the highest echelons of society, then back again to the streets of Greenwich Village, where starving families rub shoulders with the recently evicted. In the process, Tsiang captures, hour-by-hour, Mr. Nut's profound transformation from itinerant roustabout to radical activist. Adventurous and unclassifiable in its combination of avant-garde and proletarian concerns, The Hanging on Union Square is a major rediscovery of a uniquely American voice". Cultural historian Alan M. Wald author of American Night: The Literary Left in the Era of the Cold War describes the book as, "An artist of distinction, H.T. Tsiang created a genre unto itself in 1935 with The Hanging on Union Square. Its republication after seventy-five years rescues - from an outlaw existence - a strangely and beautifully evocative satiric allegory". Kaya Press, established in 1994, is a publisher of Asian Pacific Diasporas.
