= Chinaman, Laundryman =

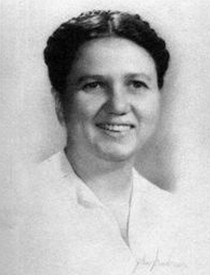
Ruth Crawford Seeger

"Chinaman, Laundryman" is a song composed by Ruth Crawford Seeger. The song depicts the exploitation of an immigrant Chinese laundry worker.

In 1932 Ruth Crawford Seeger composed two songs for a commission from the Society of Contemporary Music in Philadelphia, which she called Two Ricercari. The first, Sacco, Vanzetti is a tribute to the infamous executions of the two Italian Anarchists after whom the piece is named, in Massachusetts. The second, Chinaman, Laundryman, depicts the exploitation of an immigrant Chinese laundry worker. Both are settings of politically militant poems written in 1928 by a young Chinese author, H.T. Tsiang. When she wrote the songs, Crawford was a member of the Composer’s Collective in New York City, a group under the control of the American Communist Party, which sought to enlist art in the service of politics.

Chinaman, Laundryman was premiered at the MacDowell Club in 1933, receiving favorable reviews. It was performed two more times, once in Philadelphia for the Society of Contemporary Music, and again at the First American Worker’s Music Olympiad for a large audience of leftist workers. It was not performed again during the composer’s life. (Tick 1997, pp. 188–194)

== Form ==
The text of “Chinaman” contains two characters, a boss who verbally assaults his employee, and the Chinese laundryman himself who delivers a recitation describing the harsh working conditions he endures and spurring his fellow men to work for a better world. Crawford’s heterophonic setting is for a solo mezzosoprano with piano accompaniment. The singer employs Sprechstimme (Sprechgesang), or speech voice, a technique in which notes are indicated as approximations rather than definite tones, in order to give primacy to the text. The piano accompaniment is a monotonous series given in octaves that transmits the remorseless oppression of the capitalist boss and the inhuman conditions in which the exploited worker exists. (Tick 1997, pp. 188–194)

== Analysis ==
The pitch material in the piano part is strictly ordered and based on a process of rotation and transposition that is typical of Crawford. A nine note tone row, T0, one measure in duration, is presented, then rotated so that it begins its second iteration on the second note of the original row and ends on the first, the third iteration on the third note of the original ending on the second, and so on. After nine measures, each beginning on a new pitch of T0, the original row is transposed down a semitone, to begin on the second note of the original row, T11, and rotated as before for nine measures. Crawford continues the pattern, transposing the original row so that it starts on successive pitches of T0 and rotating the transpositions (with only a few anomalies) until she has done this nine times (T10, T8, T5, T9, T7, T4, and T6), then presents the original row and its rotations one last time. This pattern is depicted in figure 1, in which numbers under notes indicate measures in which that note begins the row. (Hisama 2001, p. 78)

The rhythm is also serialized. Three rhythmic patterns, x, y, and z, made up of different combinations of pentuplets, sixteenth notes, triplets, and eighth notes organize the nine notes. With minor variation, the three patterns are played in groups as some permutation of xyz (zxy, yzx, etc.) until each permutation has been used before any one permutation is repeated. In this way, the three measure groupings are organized into groups of six, as in part B of figure 2. (Straus 1995, p. 117)

The designation of this song as a Ricercar, a term which traditionally describes “work employing learned contrapuntal devices” certainly derives from this formulaic serialization of pitch and rhythmic content.

The vocal line includes motivic contours characteristic of both the boss and the laundryman. The boss’ signature motive is an ascending tritone or a phrase that outlines one, as in measures one and two of part A in figure 2, and the laundryman’s motive begins on the highest and end on the lowest note in the phrase and contains tones that lie within those boundaries in predominantly descending order, as in measures 4 through 6 of the same figure. The majority of utterances by the two characters throughout the song follow these contours. In the final fifteen measures of the song, the laundryman turns from lamenting his circumstances and implores his fellow workers to unite, a passage in which he alternates singing his descending motive and the bosses ascending tritone. The piano accompaniment returns to the original row in the same measure that this passage begins, reflecting that the laundryman is changed from the opening of the piece and is ready to do something more to change his situation than simply articulate it. (Hisama 2001, p. 92)
