= Hsi Tseng Tsiang =

American poet

- Hsi Tseng Tsiang in My Three Sons 1963
- Born: Hsi Tseng Tsiang; June 10, 1899; Jiangsu, China
- Died: July 16, 1971; Hollywood, Los Angeles, California, U.S.
- Education: Southeast University, Stanford University, Columbia University, The New School for Social Research
- Occupations: Novelist, poet, playwright, actor, political and Chinese community rights activist, and newspaper editor

Notes
- https://www.newspapers.com/article/lincoln-heights-bulletin-news-ht-tsian/185726619/

Hsi Tseng Tsiang (Chinese: 蔣希曾; pinyin: Jiǎng Xīzēng; Wade–Giles: Chiang Hsi-tseng; 1899–1971), also known as H.T. Tsiang, was a Chinese-American actor and writer of novels, poetry, and plays. Tsiang created works associated with the life of early 20th-Century Chinese Americans and the working class in the United States.

He was one of the first Chinese-American left-wing writers who utilized his works to promote social changes. His most well-known novels include: And China Has Hands, China Red and The Hanging on Union Square. In later life, he became a film actor, appearing in 23 movies and multiple television series.1966.

== Early Life in China ==
Tsiang was born in the Chinese province of Jiangsu in 1899. He was orphaned at a young age and was raised by his relatives. He eventually finished high school and was admitted to Southeast University. Tsiang came of age during the 1911 Revolution, witnessing the assassination of Liao Zhongkai. Experiencing the 1911 Revolution and its aftermath, he became a leftist. For a time, Tsiang worked within the KMT as an aide to Sun Yat-Sen's secretary.

== Early Life in the United States ==
After Sun Yat-sen's 1925 death and Chiang Kai-shek’s subsequent rise to power, Tsiang’s communist leanings disagreed with the Kuomintang's increasingly conservative politics, leading to Tsiang fleeing to the United States to avoid potential consequences. He continued his higher education at Stanford University, where he would pursue graduate studies in economics, history and literature. From 1926-27, Tsiang edited Shao Nian Zhongguo (The Young China), a pro-Kuomintang newspaper based in San Francisco. Tsiang was removed from Shao Nian Zhongguo's staff when he began to openly criticize Chiang Kai-shek. Tsiang then became the Chinese editor of the bilingual publication “The Chinese Guide to America.” Other like-minded people in San Francisco's Chinatown, like Benjamin Fee, were critical of Tsiang, calling him “personally erratic, financially irresponsible and politically dubious.” In 1927 Tsiang was expelled from Stanford for his political activities and subsequently moved to New York City, where he attended Columbia University Graduate School of Journalism.

== Writing career ==
In 1929, Tsiang self-published Poems of the Chinese Revolution, a collection of poems focusing on the so-called ongoing struggle for communism and arguing for a broader “world-revolution.” Several of the poems were previously published in Daily Worker and New Masses.

In an introduction to the book's second edition, Upton Sinclair wrote:

"This is a voice to which the white world, the so-called civilized world, will have to listen more and more as time passes. I do not mean to this particular young Chinese poet, but to the movement which he voices. The exploited races of the world are awakening and demanding the rights of human beings. Here is a young Chinese student whom the American authorities sought to deport and deliver to the executioner's axe at home. What he has written is not perfect poetry, but it is the perfect voice of Young China, protesting against the lot of the under-dog."

Two of Tsiang's poems from Poems of the Chinese Revolution, Chinaman, Laundryman and Sacco Vanzetti were subsequently adapted into songs by Ruth Crawford Seeger.

In 1931, Tsiang released his first novel China Red, a romance novel. Tsiang later released the book, The Hanging on Union Square: An American Epic in 1935. Like Tsiang's other works, The Hanging on Union Square was self-published, with Tsiang selling the books manually in Greenwich Village. Tsiang's final novel, And China Has Hands was published in 1937.

Tsiang's last published work was the 1938 play China Marches On.

At around the time China Marches On was published, Tsiang became ill for a period of time, and as a result, he was forced to withdraw from Columbia University, where he continued his studies. After recovering his health, Tsiang enrolled in early 1940 in the theatre department of The New School for Social Research. As a result of his student visa lapsing, Tsiang was detained by the United States Immigration and Naturalization Service, and incarcerated at Ellis Island from November 1940 to July 1941. A campaign commenced for Tsiang's release involving the American Civil Liberties Union, American Committee for the Protection of Foreign Born, and well-known leftist individuals including Rockwell Kent and Ira Gollobin. During his incarceration, Tsiang continued writing poetry on toilet paper, and later, on a typewriter.

Tsiang then pursued a private bill for immigration relief from Congressman Vito Marcantonio, who was allied with his causes. After Marcantonio was unable to accommodate the request, Tsiang then turned to Congresswoman Jeannette Rankin, who introduced on June 5, 1941, HR 4962. As long as this bill was under consideration, Tsiang could stay in the United States; however, as shipping to Asia had been vastly curtailed due to the Pacific War, it was unlikely that Tsiang would have ever been deported to China. Tsiang's immigration status was temporarily solidified upon the passage of the Chinese Exclusion Repeal Act.

== Acting career ==
Tsiang started his acting career in a 1930 Theatre Guild production of Sergei Tretyakov's Roar, China!, Broadway's first play with a majority Asian cast. He later trained as an actor with the German director and producer of political theatre Erwin Piscator, while attending The New School for Social Research.

Tsiang would, by the late 1930s, begin to transition away from his writing career to stage acting, mostly in low-budget solo performances. "In 1939, he could be found at eight o’clock every Monday night, standing at the corner of Fourteenth Street and Third Avenue in New York, inveigling passersby to attend his play. He charged employed customers ten cents and let in the unemployed for free. According to a New York Times reporter, Tsiang acted 'as his own stage manager, electrician, and master of ceremonies. Nor is he too proud to turn on the electric fan in the surprisingly crowded room or to bustle busily about, moving chairs and setting up stage props. . . . Later he steps into the play in sundry small parts, as a Chinese general or wearing a mask to represent Death (“Playwright”)." Tsiang performed in versions of China Marches On from 1939 until 1944 in New York and Los Angeles. At times, the play enjoyed relatively lavish production values when sponsored, for instance, by the United Chinese Relief Fund; however, at other times, Tsiang was forced, due to lack of funds, to produce his play without props or costumes.

After his release from Ellis Island, Tsiang resumed studies at The New School for Social Research, performing in Piscator's student production of War and Peace, as well as adapting The Hanging on Union Square for the stage.

By 1943, Tsiang had permanently moved to Los Angeles to pursue a film acting career. His early film credits included Thirty Seconds Over Tokyo, The Keys of the Kingdom, Betrayal from the East, China Sky, China's Little Devils, and Tokyo Rose, in roles ranging from a magistrate in China Sky to a Japanese spy in Betrayal from the East.

After the end of World War II and the rise of McCarthyism, Tsiang found himself again at odds with the United States Immigration and Naturalization Service and the Federal Bureau of Investigation, with Tsiang being incarcerated at Federal Correctional Institution, Terminal Island for a brief period. Hua Hsu, in writing "A Floating Chinaman," his exploration of the legacies of Tsiang and Pearl S. Buck, whose works Tsiang frequently criticized, examined the FBI surveillance reports on Tsiang’s activities, noting that some observers found Tsiang to be a mild-mannered individual who was relatively harmless, albeit very progressive in his politics.

Tsiang again relied on well-connected friends to advocate for him. Lewis Milestone, who had directed H.T. Tsiang in The Purple Heart, wrote to Representative Helen Gahagan Douglas, urging her to sponsor a private bill on Tsiang's behalf. Rep. Douglas, who had been an actress and who was married to Academy Award winning actor Melvyn Douglas, was sympathetic to Tsiang's plight. Milestone cited his relationship to Tsiang:

The director cast actors of Asian descent in significant roles. There are few Chinese actors in the country; Tsiang is among those who have worked in the industry. During the war, Tsiang participated in the production of films intended to support morale for the military and the public.

On May 6, 1946, Douglas sponsored a private bill, H.R. 6310, which was introduced in Congress on May 3, 1946, which solidified Tsiang's immigration status. However, Tsiang remained under threat of deportation until at least 1956.

After his move to Los Angeles, Tsiang maintained his stage acting career, supported by his earnings as a film actor, self-producing productions of The Hanging on Union Square, as a one-act play in verse, along with his Canton Rickshaw Girl, another one-act play. This production was presented annually from 1943 to 1948 at the Rainbow Etienne Studio in Hollywood. Tsiang, in a note to Rockwell Kent enclosing a laudatory Daily People's World review of the premiere of the show's fifth season, noted that major actors and directors such as Gregory Peck, Orson Welles, Rita Hayworth, Alfred Hitchcock, Vincent Price, Lewis Milestone, and Joseph L. Mankiewicz had attended the show. Tsiang also took The Hanging on Union Square and China Marches On to San Francisco for performances at the California Labor School.

However, Tsiang's political views resulted in his being de facto blacklisted from movies and television from 1951 until 1960. During this time, Tsiang returned to the stage full-time, performing at various points in a one-man production of Hamlet, which he performed for twelve years every Friday evening in Hollywood, and at the La Jolla Playhouse in its 1952 production of Remains to Be Seen, as well as at the Pasadena Playhouse, hotels, colleges, private homes, and coffee houses in Southern California. Because of his accent, which audiences found amusing, Tsiang eventually wrote and performed a one-man adaptation of Hamlet set at a nudist colony entitled Wedding in a Nudist Colony. He eventually incorporated scenes from Othello, Julius Caesar, and readings from Poems of the Chinese Revolution into his one-man show.

With the end of the Hollywood blacklist in the late 1950s, Tsiang returned to film and television work, typically playing the role of a Chinese cook, waiter, or houseboy, in films such as Let's Make Love, Ocean's 11 and The Swinger, and television series including Gunsmoke, I Spy, My Three Sons, and Hawaiian Eye.

== Final years and death ==
Tsiang suffered a stroke in 1965, from which he never fully recovered. He retired from acting, as he was no longer able to memorize lines, retreating to a solitary life in a modest Chinatown apartment, where he had lived since permanently moving to Los Angeles. He died after "a long illness" at White Memorial Medical Center in Los Angeles on July 16, 1971.
