= Ruth Crawford Seeger =

American composer (1901–1953)

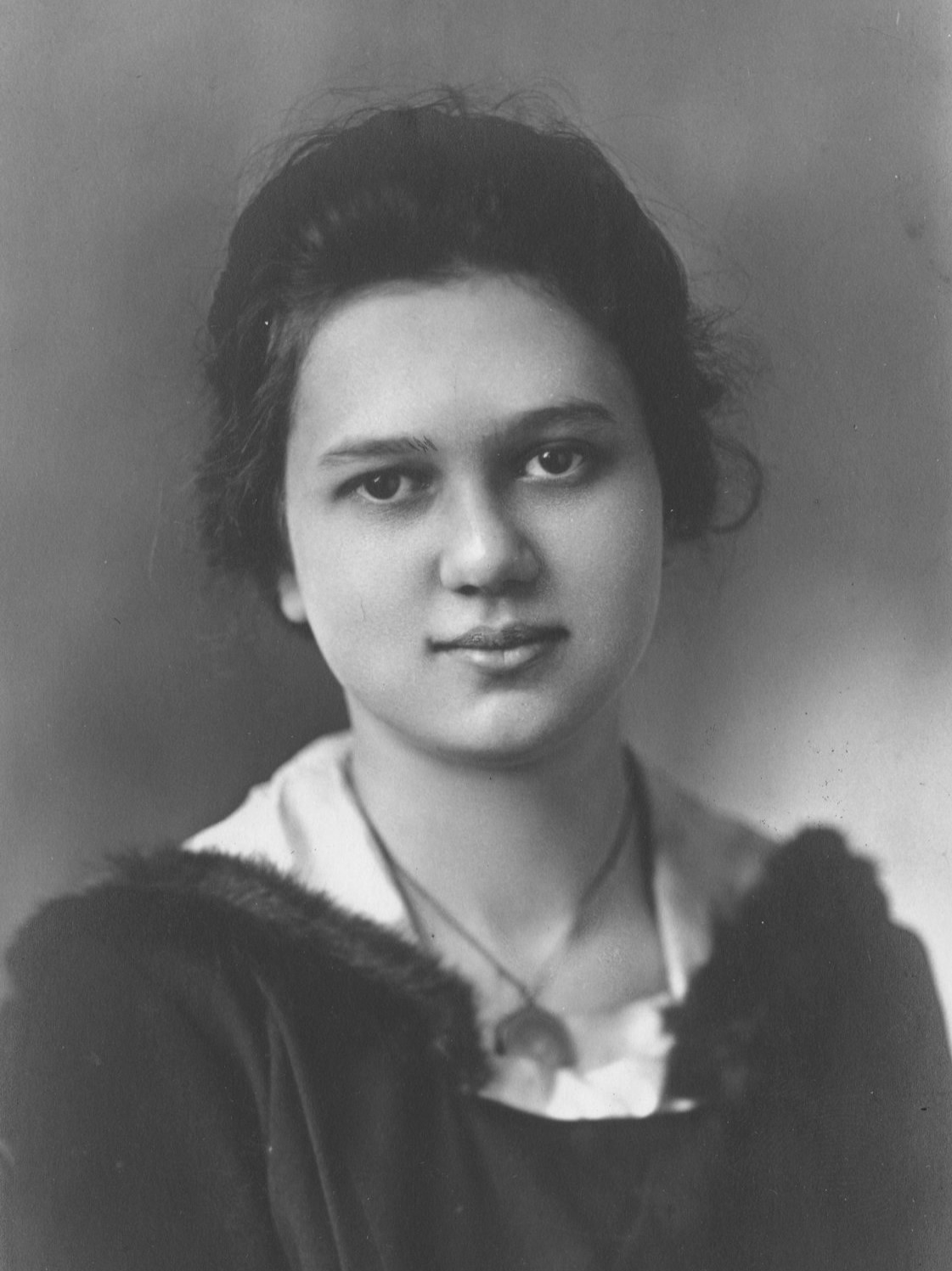
- Crawford Seeger during her years in Chicago, c. early 1920s
- Born: Ruth Porter Crawford; July 3, 1901; East Liverpool, Ohio, U.S.
- Died: November 18, 1953 (aged 52); Chevy Chase, Maryland, U.S.
- Education: American Conservatory of Music
- Occupations: Composer; musicologist
- Spouse: Charles Seeger (m. 1932)
- Children: 7 (including Peggy and Mike Seeger and her 3 step-children)

Ruth Crawford Seeger (born Ruth Porter Crawford; July 3, 1901 – November 18, 1953) was an American composer and musicologist. Her music heralded the emerging modernist aesthetic, and she became a central member of a group of American composers known as the "ultramodernists". She composed primarily during the 1920s and 1930s, turning towards studies on folk music from the late 1930s until her death. Her music influenced later composers including Elliott Carter.

She is best known for her String Quartet (1931), which is "regarded as one of the finest modernist works of the genre".

== Early life ==
Ruth Crawford Seeger was born Ruth Porter Crawford on July 3, 1901, in East Liverpool, Ohio, the second child of Methodist minister Clark Crawford and Clara Crawford (née Graves). The family moved several times during Crawford's childhood, living in Akron, Ohio, St. Louis, and Muncie, Indiana. In 1912, the family moved to Jacksonville, Florida, where Clark died of tuberculosis two years later. After her husband's death, Clara opened a boarding house and struggled to maintain her family's middle-class lifestyle.

Ruth began writing poetry at an early age and as a teenager had aspirations to become an "authoress or poetess". She also studied the piano beginning at age six. In 1913, she began piano lessons with Bertha Foster, who had founded the School of Musical Arts in Jacksonville in 1908. In 1917, Ruth began studying with Madame Valborg Collett, a student of Agathe Backer Grøndahl and the most prestigious teacher at Foster's school. After she graduated from high school in 1918, Crawford began to pursue a career as a concert pianist, continuing her studies with Collett and performing at various musical events in Jacksonville. She also became a piano teacher at Foster's school and wrote her first compositions for her young pupils in 1918 and 1919.

== Career ==
=== Chicago ===
Crawford moved to Chicago in 1921, where she enrolled at the American Conservatory of Music. She initially planned to stay for a single year, long enough to earn a teaching certificate. In Chicago, she attended symphony and opera performances for the first time, as well as recitals by eminent pianists including Sergei Rachmaninoff and Arthur Rubinstein. She studied piano with Heniot Levy and Louise Robyn at the conservatory, though her focus quickly shifted from piano performance to composition. During her second year at the conservatory, she began composition and music theory studies with Adolf Weidig and wrote several early works, including a Nocturne for Violin and Piano (1923) and a set of theme and variations for piano (1923). Clara Crawford moved to Chicago to live with her daughter in 1923. The next year, Ruth received her bachelor's degree and subsequently enrolled in the American Conservatory's master's degree program.

While Crawford continued to study theory and composition with Weidig through 1929, in 1924 she also began private piano lessons with Djane Lavoie-Herz. One of the most prestigious piano teachers in Chicago at the time, Herz had a profound impact on Crawford's intellectual and musical life. Herz sparked Crawford's interest in Theosophy and the Theosophy-influenced music of Russian composer Alexander Scriabin, and introduced her pupil to an influential community of artists and thinkers including Dane Rudhyar and Henry Cowell. During this time, Crawford also met poet Carl Sandburg, whose writings she would eventually set to music. In 1925, she composed "The Adventures of Tom Thumb," an experiment which combined spoken word with music.

=== New York City and travels in Europe ===
Crawford spent the summer of 1929 at the MacDowell Colony in Peterborough, New Hampshire, on a scholarship, where she began a friendship with fellow composer Marion Bauer and began work on her Five Songs set to poems by Sandburg. Crawford moved into the New York City home of music patron Blanche Walton and began studying composition with Charles Seeger that autumn.

In 1930, Crawford became the first female composer to receive a Guggenheim Fellowship; she used the grant money to travel to Berlin and Paris. She inquired about a renewal of her fellowship several times over the course of the next year, but this was ultimately refused. During that time, she interviewed Emil Hertzka to discuss publishing her music, but he said that "it would be particularly hard for a woman to get anything published". Crawford subsequently travelled to Vienna and Budapest to meet with Alban Berg and Béla Bartók in order to discuss her music and gain support for publication. Though surrounded by exponents of German modernism, she chose to study and compose alone. Charles Seeger's ideas, communicated to her by letter, were crucial to the development of her style and selections.

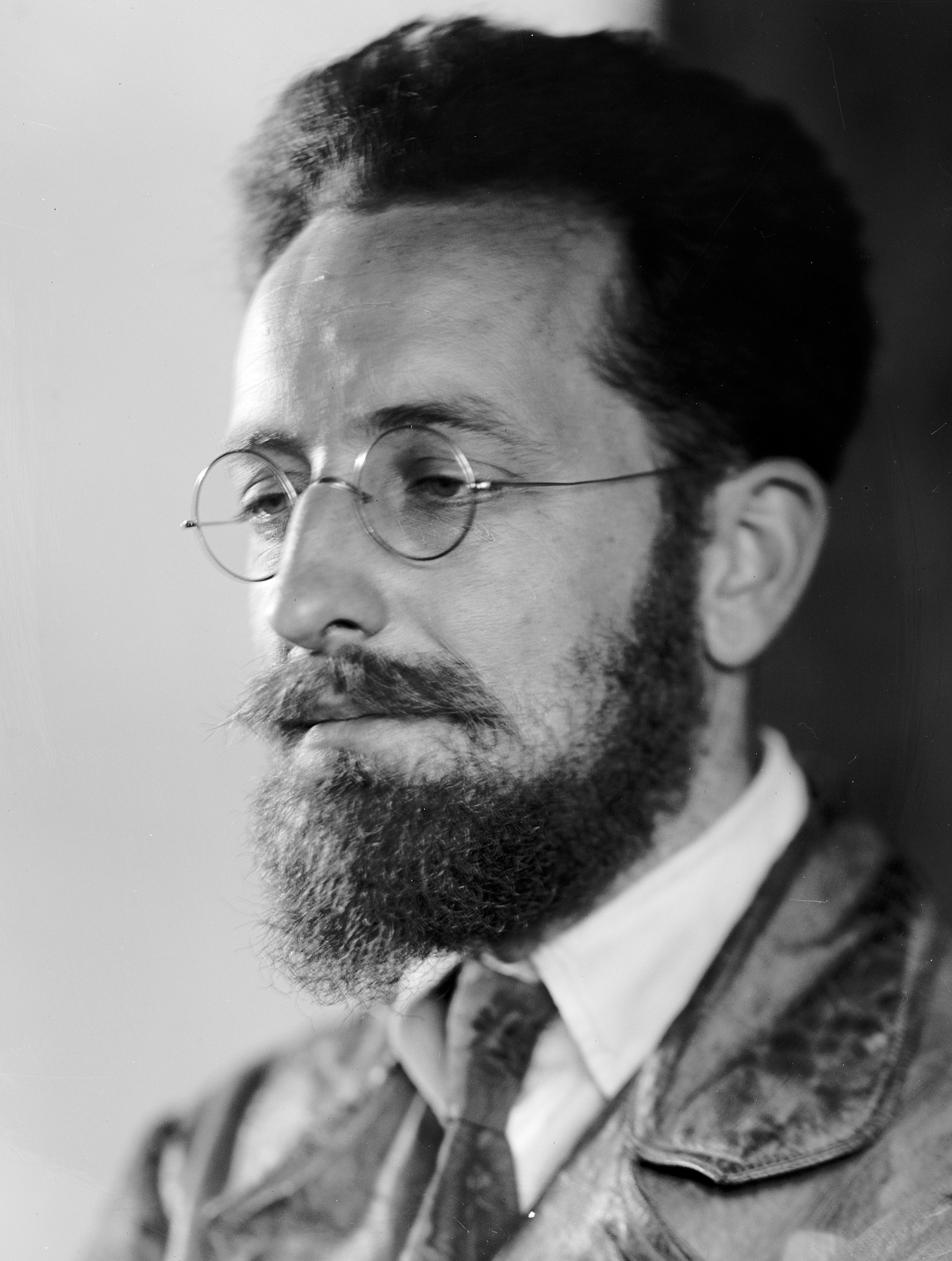
Ruth Crawford married Charles Seeger in 1932

She and Seeger married in 1932 after she made a trip to Paris. At the 1933 International Society for Contemporary Music Festival in Amsterdam, her Three Songs for voice, oboe, percussion and strings, which set poems by Sandburg, represented the United States.

=== Washington, D.C. and Seeger's Shift to Folk Music ===
In 1933, Ruth Crawford Seeger significantly reduced her compositional output for a number of reasons. When Seeger gave birth to her first child, Michael, in 1933, she was passionately devoted to motherhood, committing as much time and energy as she could to taking care of him. Looking back at this time and the work motherhood entailed, Seeger said it was like "composing babies". It was also at this time that the Seegers faced severe financial hardship. Charles Seeger lost his teaching position at the Institute of Musical Art, a job which he had held for 15 years. He kept a part-time position at The New School in New York, but this job along with donations from friends and family were the Seeger family's only source of income.

In November 1935, during the harshest winter the Seeger family had faced up to this point, Charles Seeger received a call about a full-time job position in Washington D.C. working for a new federal relief agency called the Resettlement Administration. "About a month ago out of the blue descended on us from Washington a job," Ruth Seeger wrote the following January, considering the offer to be somewhat of a miracle given the bleak circumstances they had been facing. Charles Seeger's new job within this agency was to teach those left displaced and unemployed by the Great Depression to play music, inspiring Ruth and Charles to recognize a new connection between music and the social experience of working-class Americans. Upon realizing certain misconceptions she had held about American music up to this point, Ruth Seeger wrote, "We had been here only a couple of months when Charlie began to get his fingers on the pulse of some of this very live-and-kicking music of 'unmusical' America." A passion was born within Ruth Seeger and this passion led her away from composition in favor of documenting, preserving, and teaching the canon of American folk music.

She worked closely with folklorists John and Alan Lomax at the Library of Congress' Archive of American Folk Song to preserve and teach American folk music. Her arrangements and interpretations of American folk songs are among the most respected. These include transcriptions for American Folk Songs for Children, Animal Folk Songs for Children (1950), American Folk Songs for Christmas (1953), Our Singing Country (1941), and Folk Song USA by John and Alan Lomax. She also composed "Rissolty, Rossolty" – An American Fantasy for Orchestra, based on folk tunes, for the CBS radio series The American School of the Air.

Crawford Seeger returned to her modernist roots in early 1952 with her Suite for Wind Quintet, but died of intestinal cancer in November of the following year.

== Family ==
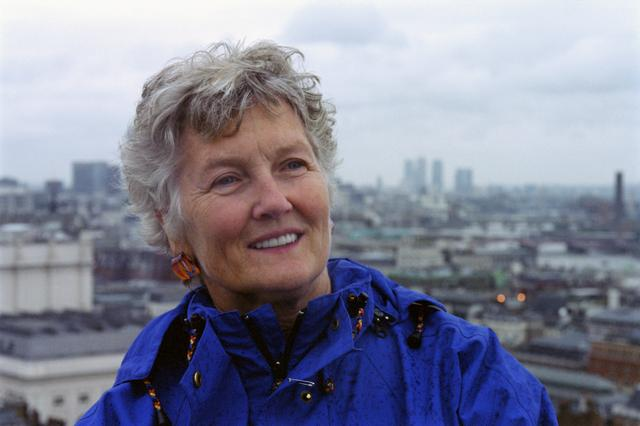
Crawford Seeger passed on her knowledge of American folk music to daughter Peggy Seeger.

In 1932, Ruth married Charles Seeger. Their children included Mike Seeger, Peggy Seeger, Barbara and Penny. They knew their mother as "Dio". Charles had three children from his first marriage with Constance de Clyver Edson, (professional violinist, studied and taught at Juilliard School) Charles III, John and Pete Seeger. By the time of their father’s second marriage John and Charles were adults but Pete was only 13 years old. Ruth took it upon herself to take on full parental responsibilities and treat Pete as one of her own. Several of the children themselves became musical artist central to the American folk music revival, but had little knowledge of their mother's earlier works. Her children went on to record some of her folk song compilations.

== Compositions ==
The compositions that Crawford Seeger wrote in Chicago from 1924 to 1929 reflect the influence of Alexander Scriabin, Dane Rudhyar, and her piano teacher Djane Lavoie-Herz. Judith Tick calls these years Crawford Seeger's "first distinctive style period" and writes that the composer's music during this time "might be termed 'post-tonal pluralism'". Her compositions from this first style period, including Five Preludes for Piano, Sonata for Violin and Piano, Suite No. 2 for Strings and Piano, and Five Songs on Sandburg Poems (1929), are marked by strident dissonance, irregular rhythms, and evocations of spirituality.

Crawford Seeger's reputation as a composer rests chiefly on her New York compositions written between 1930 and 1933, which exploit dissonant counterpoint and American serial techniques. During these years, Crawford began to incorporate polytonality and tone clusters into her compositions. She was one of the first composers to extend serial processes to musical elements other than pitch and to develop formal plans based on serial operations. Her technique may have been influenced by the music of Arnold Schoenberg, although they met only briefly during her studies in Germany. Many of her works from this period also employ dissonant counterpoint, a theoretical compositional system developed by Charles Seeger and also used by Henry Cowell, Johanna Beyer, and other "ultramodernists". Seeger outlined his methodology for dissonant counterpoint in his treatise, Tradition and Experiment in (the New) Music, which he wrote with the input and assistance of Crawford during the summer of 1930. Crawford Seeger's contribution to the book was significant enough that the possibility of co-authorship was briefly raised.

Crawford Seeger's String Quartet (1931), particularly its third movement, is her most famous and influential work. She described the "underlying plan" of the third movement as "a heterophony of dynamics—a sort of counterpoint of crescendi and diminuendi. ... The melodic line grows out of this continuous increase and decrease; it is given, one tone at a time, to different instruments, and each new melodic tone is brought in at the high point in a crescendo". (Note: Analysis by Ruth Crawford Seeger of the third and fourth movements of her String Quartet 1931, in Tick 1997, 357–358.)

== Influence on music education ==
Ruth Crawford Seeger's contributions extend beyond her work in modern classical music; she was a central figure in the American folk music revival and its integration into children's music education. Her innovative approach has left a lasting impact on how folk music is used in teaching.

Crawford's interest in American folk music deepened after her marriage to Charles Seeger. Together, they explored the cultural and social significance of folk music during the Great Depression, a time when folk traditions were at risk of being forgotten. In 1935, she collaborated with John and Alan Lomax to transcribe over 800 field recordings, a project that enriched her understanding of traditional American music. This endeavor not only influenced her composition but also shaped her family's legacy. Her children, particularly Peggy Seeger, became leading figures in the American folk music movement, with Peggy recalling, "The house resounded with music morning, noon, and night".

While living in Silver Spring, Maryland, Crawford began her direct engagement with children's music education. At her daughter Barbara's cooperative nursery school, Crawford initially felt uneasy in her role as a teacher's aide but quickly adapted. One pivotal moment came when she personalized the folk tune Mary Wore Her Red Dress, incorporating the names and clothing of the children in her class. This experience inspired her to create a music booklet featuring simple piano arrangements of American folk songs for children and caregivers.

The booklet, designed during the Great Depression, was a breakthrough in making music education accessible. Its straightforward arrangements allowed parents—particularly mothers—to learn and play with their children, bringing music into homes and fostering a greater appreciation for folk traditions. The booklet grew to eventually become the American Folk Songs for Children published by Oak Publications in 1948.

Ruth Crawford Seeger's work in transcribing, arranging, and teaching folk music laid the foundation for its integration into mid-twentieth-century music education, shaping repertoire and practices in schools. Her legacy in this field continues to influence music educators today .

""The music of American folk song" and selected other writings on American folk music" were collected and published posthumously, compiling her writings on transcription, field recordings, and music education.

== Works ==
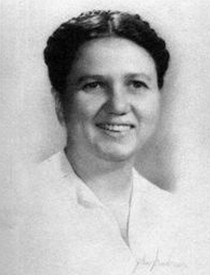
Ruth Crawford Seeger

A complete and detailed listing of Ruth Crawford Seeger's compositions can be found on the Boulanger Initiative Database of Women Composers and Gender-Marginalized Composers Repertoire.

=== Early period (1922–29) ===
- Little Waltz, for piano, 1922
- Piano Sonata, 1923
- Theme and Variations, for piano, 1923
- Little Lullaby, for piano, 1923
- Jumping the Rope (Playtime), for piano, 1923
- Caprice, for piano, 1923
- Whirligig, for piano, 1923
- Mr Crow and Miss Wren Go for a Walk (A Little Study in Short Trills), for piano, 1923
- Kaleidoscopic Changes on an Original Theme, Ending with a Fugue, for piano, 1924
- Five Canons, for piano, 1924
- Piano Preludes No. 1–5, 1924–25
- Adventures of Tom Thumb, 1925
- Sonata for Violin and Piano, 1926
- Two Movements for Chamber Orchestra (Music for Small Orchestra), 1926
- We Dance Together, for piano, 1926
- Piano Preludes No. 6–9, 1927–28 (corrected version)
- Suite No. 1, for five wind instruments and piano, 1927, rev. 1929
- Suite No. 2, for four strings and piano, 1929
- Five Songs to Poems by Carl Sandburg: Home Thoughts, White Moon, Joy, Loam, Sunsets, 1929

=== Middle period (1930–32) ===
- Piano Study in Mixed Accents (three versions), 1930
- Four Diaphonic Suites: No. 1 for oboe or flute, No. 2 for bassoon and cello (or two cellos), No. 3 for two clarinets, No. 4 for oboe (or viola) and cello, 1930
- Three Chants for Female Chorus: To an Unkind God, To an Angel, To a Kind God, 1930
- Three Songs to poems by Carl Sandburg, for contralto, piano, oboe, percussion and optional orchestra: Rat Riddles, Prayers of Steel, In Tall Grass, 1930–1932
- String Quartet, 1931
- Andante for Strings (after String Quartet Slow Movement), 1931?
- Two Ricercare to poems by Hsi Tseng Tsiang: Sacco, Vanzetti; "Chinaman, Laundryman", 1932
- The Love at the Harp, 1932 ?

=== Late period (after 1932) ===
- Nineteen American Folk Songs for Piano, 1936–1938
- Rissolty, Rossolty, 1939–1941
- American Folk Songs for Children, 1948
- Animal Folk Songs for Children, 1950
- Suite for Wind Quintet, 1952
- American Folk Songs for Christmas, 1953

=== Unknown date ===
- Songs: Those Gambler's Blues, Lonesome Road, Lord Thomas, Sweet Betsy from Pike, Go to Sleep, What'll We Do with the Baby?, Three Ravens, A Squirrel Is a Pretty Thing, Who Built the Ark?, Every Monday Morning, I Wish I Was Single

== Notes and references ==
=== Sources ===
- "Composer: Ruth Crawford Seeger – 57 works found". Boulanger Initiative.
- John Simon Guggenheim Memorial Foundation: "Ruth Crawford"
- Hisama, Ellie M. (2001). Gendering Musical Modernism: The Music of Ruth Crawford, Marion Bauer, and Miriam Gideon. Cambridge and New York: Cambridge University Press. ISBN 0-521-64030-X.
- Robin, William (2017). "The Pioneering Modernist Who Wrote an Audacious String Quartet". The New York Times.
- Salzman, Eric (2002). Twentieth Century Music: An Introduction, 4th edition. Prentice Hall History of Music Series. Upper Saddle River, New Jersey: Prentice Hall. ISBN 0130959413.
- Seeger, Charles (1994). "Tradition and Experiment in (the New) Music". In Studies in Musicology: 1929–1979, edited by Ann M. Pescatello, Berkeley: University of California Press, 1994).
- Shreffler, Anne (1994). "Elliott Carter and His America", Sonus 14, no. 2:39 & 49.
- Tick, Judith (1997). Ruth Crawford Seeger: A Composer's Search for American Music. Oxford and New York: Oxford University Press. ISBN 978-0-19-506509-1. OCLC 33246150 – via Internet Archive.
- Tick, Judith (2001). "Crawford (Seeger), Ruth (Porter)". Grove Music Online (8th ed.). Oxford University Press. doi:10.1093/gmo/9781561592630.article.06796. ISBN 978-1-56159-263-0. (subscription, Wikilibrary access, or UK public library membership required)
- Watts, Sarah H.; Campbell, Patricia Shehan (2008). "American folk songs for children: Ruth Crawford Seeger's contributions to music education". Journal of Research in Music Education. 56 (3): 238–254. doi:10.1177/0022429408327176.
- Wilson Kimber, Marian (2017). The Elocutionists: Women, Music, and the Spoken Word. Music in American Life. Urbana, Illinois; Chicago; Springfield, Ohio: University of Illinois Press. ISBN 978-0-252-04071-9.
