= Chinese laundrymen in the United States =

In the United States, Chinese Laundrymen refers to the Chinese immigrant workers who, primarily in the late 19th and early 20th centuries, operated hand laundries as a means of economic survival amid widespread labor discrimination.

Emerging during and after the California Gold Rush, many Chinese immigrants initially entered mining and railroad labor but were later pushed into service industries due to widespread discrimination and exclusion. Among the services, laundry required relatively little capital, formal training, or English proficiency. Therefore it became one of the most accessible and widespread occupations among Chinese men. As a result, Chinese laundry businesses formed a distinctive part of urban and small-town economies across the United States. According to the U.S. census in 1920, thirty percent of the Chinese employed in the country worked in laundries. By the time of around 1950 in Chicago, it is reported that 430 out of the 669 Chinese-owned businesses were laundries.

== Historical background ==
=== The Gold Rush ===
The California Gold Rush began roughly in 1848 after gold was discovered at Sutter's Mill, triggering a massive influx of migrants to California from across the United States and around the world, including Chinese. At this time, thousands of Chinese immigrants arrived in the U.S., initially drawn by the prospect of mining wealth. As the population surged, frontier communities developed rapidly, often with highly imbalanced gender ratios and limited infrastructure.

=== The emergence of the laundrymen ===
When labor opportunities were still relatively open, Chinese immigrants were employed across a wide range of industries along the Pacific Coast, with many working in gold mining, domestic service, agriculture, and other personal services. As the Gold Rush took place, the frontier communities had a significantly imbalanced gender ratio; namely, there were way more men than women, which leads to short in supply for many types of services, especially domestic work such as laundry and cooking, as well as serving in hotel and restaurant. It made it more acceptable for men to do what was considered traditionally done by women.

Due to the severe shortage of laundry services, prices of laundries were correspondingly high, with the cost of washing and ironing a dozen shirts reaching as much as $8. At times, laundering clothes locally became so expensive that some individuals chose to send their laundry to Honolulu, where it could be cleaned more cheaply, despite the fact that it might take several months for their clothes to be returned; both Chinese and white miners were also choosing to send soiled garments to Hong Kong to be cleaned for $12 for a dozen shirts as inflated price, which took four months. Also, the small capital outlay and less English required are attractive to the Chinese workers. Recognizing this opportunity, Chinese immigrants entered the laundry business in significant numbers. By 1860, there were approximately nine hundred Chinese laundrymen in California, and by 1870, that number had grown to nearly 3,000. One out of four employed Chinese males in the United States in 1900 was a laundryman.

Though the first Chinese laundry was likely established around the mid-nineteenth century, its exact origins remain uncertain due to the lack of surviving records. One account suggests that the first Chinese laundry in San Francisco was established by Wah Lee in the spring of 1851, who was a former gold miner and hung a sign reading 'Wash'ng and Iron'ng' at his shop on the corner of Grant Avenue and Washington Street. Wah Lee, according to this account, had been an unsuccessful gold miner before turning to laundry work. Therefore it was possible that he gained some experience in mining communities before returning to San Francisco.

Later, as Chinese immigrants dispersed across the United States, they brought with them laundry and restaurant businesses. Because they were excluded from many forms of wage labor due to racial discrimination, they were often pushed into self-employment and occupations avoided by others, and laundries were the combination of the two. At the same time, laundries aligned well with their circumstances since they required little formal training, minimal English proficiency, and limited capital, let alone they could be operated by individuals, families, or small partnerships. According to Chinese American activist and journalist Wong Chin Foo, the Chinese became laundrymen just because "there is no other occupation by which they can make money as surely and quickly."

By the early twentieth century, Chinese immigrants had dispersed across both major cities and smaller towns throughout the western United States and into regions such as the Midwest, Northeast, Mid-Atlantic, and South. Many made a living by operating small businesses, particularly laundries, restaurants, and retail shops. In 1920, nearly half of California’s Chinese population was engaged in small business.

== Structure of Chinese laundry ==
=== Physical structure ===
The Chinese laundry shop functioned both as a workplace and a living space. Its interior was typically divided into four sections. The front area, often taking up about one-third of the space, served as the main office and workshop, where the laundryman ironed clothes, received customers, and conducted daily business. Behind a curtained doorway lay the living quarters, usually small and modest, where the laundryman and any partners or employees slept, often on narrow beds or army cots. Further inside was the drying room, equipped with iron wires for hanging wet clothes and a coal stove to generate heat for drying. The rear section housed essential equipment such as washing machines, sinks, boilers, and cooking facilities, making the shop a fully self-contained environment.

Initially, most Chinese laundries were small operations that remained hand laundries despite the existence of mechanized equipment. Machinery such as wringing or ironing machines was considered optional and used mainly in larger or more competitive businesses.

The layout of the shop also reflected concerns for safety and security. The front counter acted as both a place for conducting transactions and a protective barrier, often restricting direct access to the workspace behind it. In some areas, additional protective features such as cage-like fencing and small openings for passing laundry were installed. These measures were shaped by the broader environment of racial hostility, crime, and economic vulnerability that Chinese laundrymen faced, making protection an essential aspect of the shop’s design as well as its daily operation.

One example of Chinese laundrymen is Lee Chew, who used to work as a domestic servant in an American household and later started his laundry business in a California railroad camp, because, using his own words, "... he is a more faithful worker than one of their people, have raised such a great outcry about Chinese cheap labor that they have shut him out of working on farms or in factories or building railroads or making streets or digging sewers. He cannot practice any trade, and his opportunities to do business are limited to his own countrymen. So he opens a laundry when he quits domestic service." Lee's laundry has a similar structure: "The ordinary laundry shop is generally divided into three rooms. In front is the room where the customers are received, behind that a bedroom and in the back the work shop, which is also the dining room and kitchen. The stove and cooking utensils are the same as those of the Americans. "

=== Social structure ===
==== Division of labor ====
Chinese laundries were typically small-scale operations, most often run by one to three workers, with little formal division of labor. Because the work was largely routine and did not require high-level specialization, tasks were distributed based on necessity. In single-person laundries, the laundryman handled all aspects of the business himself, from cleaning and sorting to cooking and maintaining the shop. In slightly larger operations, tasks might be informally divided, such as having one person cleaning, while another sorting laundry (known as mai-funn, which included marking, recording, and organizing clothes), and another cooking.

The working routine in Chinese laundries followed a structured weekly rhythm, though it could vary depending on customer demand. Sunday morning was often used for sorting soiled laundry (mai-funn), preparing for the week ahead, although some laundries deferred this task. Washing typically began on Monday, with some laundries also offering call-and-delivery services, where one worker collected clothes while others handled sorting, washing, and drying. The week was divided into washing days (Monday, Wednesday, Friday) and ironing days (Tuesday, Thursday, Saturday), but the actual workload depended heavily on when customers brought in their laundry. As a result, working hours could be long and uneven, often ranging from ten to sixteen hours a day, with early starts and late finishes. While Saturday afternoons might allow some rest, at least one worker usually remained in the shop to receive customers, reflecting the service-oriented nature of the business.

==== Partnership ====
Most Chinese laundries operated through small partnerships, often based on kinship or shared regional and clan ties, similar to "brotherhood," commonly referred to as “cousin partnerships.” These arrangements reflected transplanted social structures, where individuals preferred to work with relatives, clan members, or close acquaintances rather than outsiders, with responsibilities were distributed cooperatively rather than through strict specialization. Additionally, during this time many immigrant workers began making homosocial bonds. This meant that they created friendships by trading services. For example, Chinese immigrants that focused on laundry would offer to wash clothes in trade for food from a cook.

== Daily life for Chinese laundrymen ==
=== Work day ===
Work as laundrymen followed a regular weekly rhythm, with washing typically done on Mondays, Wednesdays, and Fridays, and ironing on alternate days. Sundays were nominally a rest day, though workers often spent the morning cleaning the shop and preparing laundry for the week ahead before taking the afternoon off.

According to Lee Chew, the staffing and the arrangement of working hours in the laundry shop is rather organized and orderly: "Work in a laundry begins early on Monday morning—about seven o clock. There are generally two men, one of whom washes while the other does the ironing. The man who irons does not start in till Tuesday, as the clothes are not ready for him to begin till that time. So he has Sundays and Mondays as holidays. The man who does the washing finishes up on Friday night, and so he has Saturday and Sunday. Each works only five days a week, but those are long days—from seven o'clock in the morning till midnight. "

However, working as laundryman was genuinely considered difficult and physically pushing, because it required extremely long hours. Workers often labored from early morning until the early hours of the next day, leaving only a few hours for sleep. Despite these harsh conditions, the wages were relatively high compared to what many could earn in China. In the 1920s, a laundryman could make up to $50 in a good week, which was enough to support family members back home if he pinches pennies. Over time, some workers were able to save enough to open their own businesses.

=== Leisure ===
Chinese immigrants spent their leisure time engaging in activities such as gambling and, to a lesser extent, opium smoking, though both were less widespread than commonly believed by Americans. Gambling, especially games like fan tan, poker, dominoes, and dice, was more prevalent and sometimes led to conflicts or violence, often attributed to organized groups like the Six Companies. Lee Chew believes that in reality, the Six Companies functioned as benevolent associations that supported new immigrants and represented regional ties from southern China. The religious life was more diverse, with some Chinese Christians but many practicing a mix of Buddhism and Taoism, and observances centered on traditional holidays such as the Chinese New Year and specific monthly temple visits rather than a weekly day of rest.

== Challenges, discrimination and stereotype ==
=== Challenges and injustice ===
Like many other immigrants, Chinese immigrants faced severe discrimination as they entered the U.S. and started to excel at jobs they did, and were therefore pushed into generally unwanted roles or self-entrepreneurship. However, discrimination was not mitigated after Chinese men entered the laundry business. Lee Chew recalled the experience of being robbed once: "...We were three years with the railroad, and then went to the mines, where we made plenty of money in gold dust, but had a hard time, for many of the miners were wild men who carried revolvers and after drinking would come in to our place to shoot and steal shirts, for which we had to pay. One of these men hit his head hard against a flat iron and all the miners came and broke up our laundry, chasing us out of town. They were going to hang us. We lost all our property and $365 in money, which members of the mob must have found." The immigrants were often forced to deal with this injustice, "at the present time the street boys are still breaking the windows of Chinese laundries all over the city, while the police seem to think it a joke."

Chinese laundries undersold their Jewish competitors, as they usually lived in the laundries. As a result, Jewish launderers put signs in their windows accusing Chinese launderers of smoking opium and eating rats, which created rumors and slander to stop customers from going to Chinese laundries.

=== Discrimination and isolation ===
The image of Chinese laundrymen in the eyes of American public was almost never positive. Below is an example of a discriminative song that children at that time would chant.

"Chinkie, Chinkie, Chinaman,

Sitting on the fence;

Trying to make a dollar

Out of fifteen cents.

Chink, Chink, Chinaman

Eats dead rats;

Eats them up

Like gingersnaps."

Besides, a keyword of Chinese laundrymen was isolation: the majority of Chinese laundrymen came to the United States with the goal of making fortune and eventually returning home. At the same time, widespread discrimination and exclusion often prevented them from fully embracing the United States as home.

Moreover, almost all Chinese immigrants, including the laundrymen, who came to the U.S. at that time were male and a huge portion of which were bachelors. Under the Exclusion Act, according to Lee Chew, "A laundryman can't bring his wife here under any circumstances... and if they marry American women there is a great outcry. " It was difficult for them to find and marry Chinese women, while marrying white women was not easier or considered an ordinary option by them either. And this difficulty in finding a spouse had intensified the isolation.

"The treatment of the Chinese in this country is all wrong and mean... " Says Mr. Lee Chew, "...Under the circumstances, how can I call this my home, and how can any one blame me if I take my money and go back to my village in China?"

Many of them only found their inner peace at Chinatown, which served as the primary social and cultural center for Chinese laundrymen, exemplified by the Chinatown in San Francisco. It was a place where they could speak their native language, maintain familiar customs, access Chinese goods, and stay connected to news from home. On their days off, many gathered in public spaces like Portsmouth Square, socialized with fellow villagers, and engaged in everyday leisure activities such as drinking tea, reading public notices, or walking through the neighborhood: "...for most Chinese immigrants San Francisco’s Chinatown was simply home. " Along with the isolation, Chinatown provided a shared social world where immigrants could build relationships and find comfort among relatives and friends to sustain a more familiar yet isolated life in a foreign environment.

As a result, the Chinese laundrymen often appeared to cling and maintain strong ties to their cultural heritage even after living in the country for decades, remaining in the slowest process of assimilation and extreme isolation.

=== Chinese laundryman activism in New York City ===
Laundry was a link in the long chain of Chinese American resistance in twentieth-century New York City. NYC Chinese laundrymen and women were also being suppressed by racist American trade laws which limit ownership of laundries to U.S. citizens. To persistence the laws, The Chinese Hand Laundry Alliance (CHLA) was formed in 1933. The CHLA successfully challenged this law, which saving the livelihoods of what had grown from one-quarter of Chinese men in the NYC area at the turn of the twentieth century to seven-tenths of these men in 1933.

=== On masculinity ===
East Asian men, including Chinese immigrants, were historically perceived as less masculine in the United States due to multiple reasons. Aside from visible markers such as Qing-era hairstyles and clothing made them appear “foreign” and were interpreted through a racialized lens, it was because discrimination pushed them out of traditionally “masculine” labor such as mining or other industrial work and into service roles like laundry, cooking, and caregiving, which are considered as "feminine" by the society. During the California Gold Rush, because laundry is often considered feminine work in the household similar to other domestic chores such as cooking and cleaning, it was in short of supply in the frontier communities. Chinese men who took this chance and became laundrymen as their way to make livings were therefore seen as more feminine, non-sexual, weak, or lack of masculinity compared to men of other ethnic groups.
