= Kimondo (poetry) =

Kimondo, or Kimwondo, derives from the Bantu component of the Kiswahili vocabulary, meaning “shooting star” or “meteor” and was later given the additional definition “Devil’s Torch.” This definition of the word became popular in the late seventeenth and early eighteenth centuries through the introduction of the Islamic religion during the migration of Arabs and Persians in Africa. The philosophy behind Kimondo's meaning roots from the belief that shooting stars, or Devil's Torches, are “thrown across the sky by the good faithful angels in heaven in an attempt to prevent Satan or Lucifer and his lieutenants from getting in and out of heaven”. It was believed that the devils were trying to obtain “vital information about Allah’s plans for the world”, to carry out mischief to the children of God. This, combined with the major shift of political and administrative structures at the end of the nineteenth century by European settlement, allowed the Swahili people to take part in their own electoral process within their present system of government.
