= String Quartet 1931 (Crawford Seeger) =

String quartet composed by Ruth Crawford Seeger

String Quartet
- 1931
- by Ruth Crawford Seeger
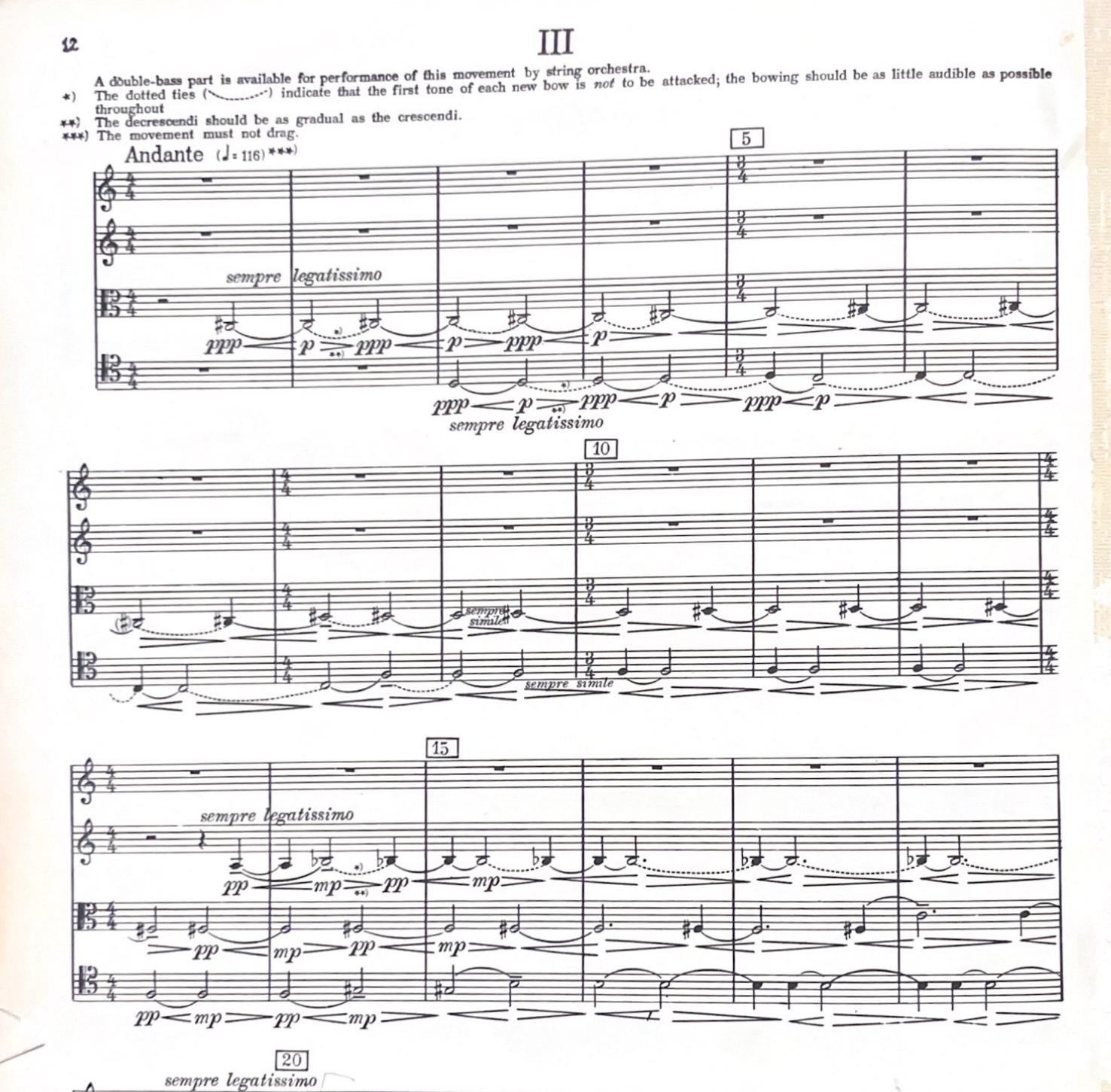
- Andante from New Music Quarterly
- Composed: Berlin, 1931
- Performed: November 13, 1933 by the New World String Quartet
- Published: 1941
- Movements: four

Ruth Crawford Seeger's String Quartet (1931) is "regarded as one of the finest modernist works of the genre". It was funded by the Guggenheim Foundation and written in the spring of 1931, during Crawford's time in Berlin. It was first published in the New Music Edition in January 1941.

== Overview ==
The composition is in four untitled movements:

1. Rubato assai
2. Leggiero
3. Andante
4. Allegro possibile

String Quartet 1931 is Crawford's most frequently performed, recorded, and analyzed work. It has been regarded as a collection of experimental procedures she developed during the previous two years, including dissonant counterpoint, early serial techniques, formal symmetries, and number centricity. By some criteria, it is considered a more conservative work, with its traditional instrumentation and four-movement formal scheme.

Each of its four movements is built upon its own structural concept, while the motives and focal elements unify them as one piece. The first movement is the only movement of the quarter for which a major draft survives. Crawford's manuscript from 1931 can be found at the Library of Congress.

The first movement features a polyphonic framework using linear formations that are subjected to various contrapuntal operations: contrary (for inversion), crab (for retrograde), and basic transposition. The goal of Crawford's contrapuntal style was to produce independence among the different parts to produce "heterophony." In this movement, she uses principles of verse form for the opening and closing sections, such as rhyme and repetition. Crawford's uses a "poem" to frame the movement, but regularly introduces new beat groups so that it is unpredictable and energetic. The movement could be described as "ametric." Her methods suggest serial procedures, but she not see her themes as rows with fixed pitch contents. In the draft score, she marked sections where she reshaped the material.

The second movement has been the least analyzed. It uses motives that are manipulated through the reordering of the intervals and constant shifting of rhythmic patterns to different parts of the beat. A unifying element of this movement is the imitation of rhythmic motives, which persists in throughout the movement in 2/4 meter. Dynamics are used in a similar manner as in the first movement, and reinforce musical effects created by the rhythm and melodic motives.

The main melody of the third movement gives rise to harmonic effects that are characteristic of Crawford's customary melodic practices. The melody is split into two large sections, the first ascending in slow arches, and the second rapidly descending to its starting point. The third movement was the first work recorded as part of the New Music Quarterly Recordings. In a letter to Charles Ives to persuade him to finance the recording, Henry Cowell wrote, "As to the value of the Crawford Quartet, I think it is without question the best movement for quartet that any American has written, and I would rather hear it than almost anything I can think of."

The fourth is the most widely discussed movement out of the whole piece. It is organized according to a pre-composed numerical plan, where the theme is subjected to a series of transformations. Crawford's favorite serial operations involve systematic permutation and transpositions, which can be heard in this movement. The first violin's unrestrained melody is played against a strictly serialized melody played by the other three instruments. In some analyses, the orderly-patterned serial voice is regarded as more "rational" and "masculine", while the first violin's individuality is more "assertive" and "feminine".

== Analysis ==
String Quartet 1931 is one of the more celebrated works in the 20th century chamber music repertory, and the third and fourth movements have received much attention from critics, musicologists, and historians.

All four movements show varying degrees of organizational frameworks. Rather than relying on the technical capabilities of the instruments, Crawford relies on instrumental timbre and the balance of textures. The piece's anticipation of rhythmic techniques have been associated with Elliott Carter, while the independent and asymmetrical part writing has been attributed to Charles Seeger's method of dissonant counterpoint.

=== I. Rubato assai ===
The first movement spans seventy-eight measures and is marked rubato assai. It contains fourteen different tempo changes, enhancing the rhapsodic nature of the movement. The effect is further accentuated by the long-line melodies with their large skips and diverse rhythmic patterns.

The opening section of the first movement was built on "metric form", referring to poetic rather than musical meter. Crawford inherited metric form from Seeger's characterization of "verse form" as a compositional technique. The phrase structure uses an AB/AB pattern, into which Crawford incorporates themes that have been transformed using contrapuntal operations. Her methods suggest serial procedures, but she did not see her themes as rows with fixed pitch contents. Rather, they are modified by "interval stretches," a term Seeger used to signify the alteration of one or two intervals within a repeat.

Although not patterned like the rhythm, the dynamics are used effectively in creating a sense of instability and fantasy. A sense of unity throughout the movement is provided by the mood and motive, and its liveliness allows it to compete with the technical prowess presented in other the movements of the quartet.

=== II. Leggiero ===
In developing his neumatic theory, Seeger characterized the scale as a series of notes derived from neumes and their transformations. Consequently, the distinction between mode and scale became blurred. In his theory of neumation, he theorized that the scale, mode, and melody become closely interrelated with each other and can no longer be seen as distinct entities. The second movement of this piece has been analyzed by musicologist Nancy Yunhwa Rao in the context of these interrelated concepts.

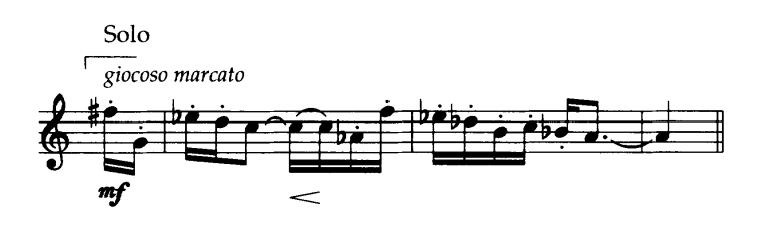
Wedging theme from String Quartet, second movement, mm. 18-20

The opening measure of the movement feature a scalar ascent that represents the neume, the scale and the melody simultaneously. It consists of a sequence composed of three hexachords, each separated by a whole tone. Crawford connects the hexachords using a joint interval of a whole tone, creating a two-octave sequence. This two-octave scale allows for the recurrence of a sequence, creating a sense of continuity. Crawford also uses this scale to create subtle differences in the overall design of the movement.

The "wedging motion" is another prominent feature of the second movement. In this context, the wedging motion is the motion from an initiating dyad toward a central destination dyad by steps or skips. This concept highlights the process of reaching a point of convergence. Its role within the overall structure of the movement is to articulate contours that contrast the contour of the two-octave scales and sequences. The repeated use of wedging motions that remain constant throughout the movement unify the movement.

=== III. Andante ===
This movement provides an example of total organization of many musical features: pitch rests, rhythm, dynamics, tempo, instrumentation, and form. The pitch content remains free throughout, but the dynamics and rhythm are controlled. Crawford structures this movement around a dynamic design that Seeger called "dynamic counterpoint." Each instrument has its own pattern that constantly changes, in which every pitch swells in the middle of the tone. The combination of these tones, with its rhythmic and dynamic patterns, create a pulsing sound effect that fade away. This "almost impressionist" has been described as sounding Bartókian.

The harmony changes one note at a time, and that series of new notes creates the basic melodic line of the movement. The four instruments take turns introducing new notes, but does not follow any systematic pattern. Thus, the melody exhibits characteristics of Klangfarbenmelodie, with its instrumental timbre constantly shifting. One note is introduced and sustained until it is the same instrument's turn to play another one. The movement of melodies can be understood as harmonies produced by the after-effects of the sustained tones.

The form of the movement is built from a aggregation of continual, short rhythmic units. All four instruments play continuously but start at different times at the beginning and at the end of the movement. The chord in measure 75 contains triple stops for all instruments. It is the only place in the entire movement where all four parts start together on the first beat of the measure.

Hisama argues that the movement also departs from the predominant Classical string quartet model where the first violin acts as the leader, while the second violin, viola, and cello provide harmonic support. Instead, the instruments work cooperatively and share the same tasks.

=== IV. Allegro possibile ===
Crawford never provided a program for the fourth movement, but it appears that she intended for it to resemble a dialogue. In her own analysis of the movement, she designates opposing parts—Voice 1 for the first violin and Voice 2 for the second violin, viola, and cello. In her personal copy, she replaced the "Allegro possibile" with "'Allegro quasi recitative", recitative begin a vocal style that imitates speech.

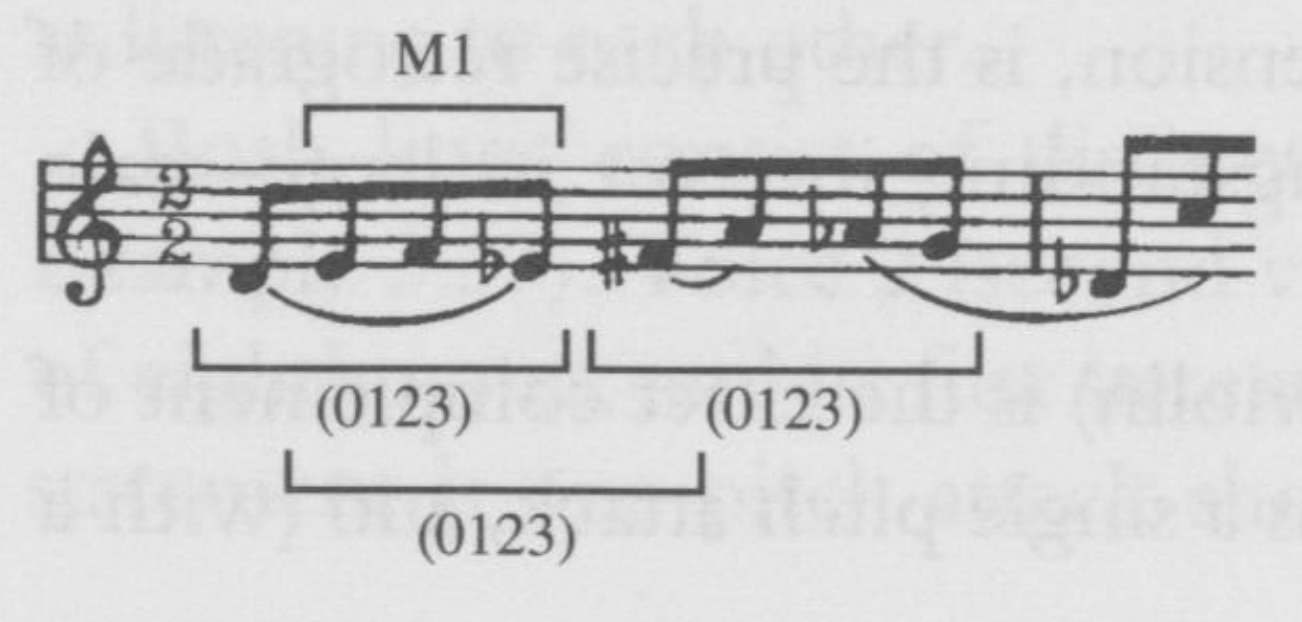
Ten-note series in Voice 2 of String Quartet, fourth movement, mm. 3-4

The two voices do not have a typical relationship of melody and accompaniment. They are designed to contrast each other as if in a vigorous dialogue. The pitch classes of Voice 2 are derived from a single ten-note series, which is typical of Crawford's usual melodies. The series is systematically rotate and transformed in a serial manner. The tonal material of Voice 1 contrasts that of Voice 2. Whereas Voice 2 has strict serial rotations, Voice 1 flows freely. It is characterized by qualities that are typical of Crawford's other free melodies. Although the two voices do not share many of the same intervals, the same segments that are heard as Voice 2 rotates complements Voice 1.

Her allusions to dialogue are the subject of many analyses. Hisama finds that the discourse reflects Crawford's experience of professional marginalization, with Voice 1 taking on an assertive, female persona, while Voice 2 represent the a rigid collective voice of male authority. In contrast, Straus describes the fourth movement as a narrative about conflict and mediation. The independent nature of the first violin can be perceived as "masculine," and despite the conflicting melodies, they still share a sense of cohesion and belonging. Both analyses could be plausible, as Straus has noted that her music "offers multiple perspectives, and privileges none of them."

The dynamics of the two voices are independent. Voice 1 aims to achieve rhythm fluidity by using an assortment of eighths, dotted quarters, ties, triplets, quintuplets, and sextuplets. In contrast, Voice 2 has a rigid character that is constructed of constant single rhythmic values that are executed through irregular bowing patterns. Throughout the movement, the opposing voices alternate and overlap.

Mathematical structuring can be seen in this movement. Her precompositional strategies often incorporate number centricity and can manifest in various musical domains. According to Seeger, the operative number is ten.

Mark Nelson has praised Crawford's inventiveness in adapting both Seeger's theories and the palindrome as a formal device. He has implied that experimental techniques that she incorporated to her compositional style around 1930 were all based on Seeger's doctrines.

== Composition ==
After beginning her studies in composition with Charles Seeger in 1929, Crawford became more focused on the contrapuntal procedures in her music, as seen in the string quartet. She had promised an orchestral work to the Guggenheim foundation, but abandoned the project after two weeks of frustration.

In the winter of 1931, despite Seeger's advice to avoid string compositions to "prevent the development of Romantic tendencies", she decided on a string quartet. She had wanted to write one in the spring of 1930, but Seeger had discouraged her at the time.

In a letter to Seeger in February 1931, she wrote,

"I went to the piano and began a one-voiced something in metric form and was rather pleased with it...The next day I took the little monody, which is lyric, and gave it a leggiero pal with a bass voice, and it insisted on becoming a string quartet. I have been wanting to write one for months—you tried to dissuade me last Spring, but the desire has come again many times this fall, so I might as well get it out. And the music came more easily, and after these six months of almost complete silence, it is such a relief. You did it. You pulled me up. You freed me."

The letter introduces "metric form", which gives general context to the opening of the first movement. Metric form was a concept that Crawford inherited from Seeger. He explained that, "Music...can be given what may be called 'verse-form' that is modelled on poetry."

In her letters to Seeger, Crawford was stuck between expressing assertions of independence and reaffirming its opposite. Some days, she would make a "declaration of independence", and others she would cry for her "dear idol Charlie." By the time she was done with the second movement, Seeger wrote an enthusiastic letter back about the new piece. Despite her claims about how much she needed Seeger, she had written her best work without him. In contrast to her earlier compositions, such as the Diaphonic Suites, which she called "ours", she never indicated anything of that sort regarding the string quartet.

She finished the quartet in Paris on June 13, 1931, and sent it out to the Guggenheim Foundation.

In 1938, she began the process of rewriting the third movement of the quartet. The third movement's climax (mm. 68-75) was not present in the 1931 version but was added several years later, as seen in the 1941 published version.

== Performance and Reception ==
Henry Cowell was no doubt Crawford's biggest advocate. In 1934, Cowell recorded the third movement of Crawford's string quartet, the only recording of her music that was released during her lifetime. In 1941, he published all four movements of the string quartet.

After its first performance by the New World String Quartet on November 13, 1933, the work was proclaimed "original and arresting", and the third movement was singled out as "remarkable."

On December 1, 1933, the New World Quartet recorded the third movement, Andante, on a twelve-inch shellac disc at Capital Sound Studios, where six hundred records were pressed.

In 1934, the third movement, now recorded, was choreographed by Betty Horst and premiered on May 28 at a gala affair.

Assessments were starting to reach a consensus regarding the discourse on serialism. Musicologist Carol J. Oja characterized the quartet as "prefiguring subsequent total serialism in the USA."

String Quartet 1931 received a lot of attention in the 1960s, when George Perle published the first analysis of the third and fourth movements. He wrote of Crawford's contributions to atonal and serial practices,

"The String Quartet 1931 of Ruth Crawford is an original and inventive work whose numerous 'experimental' features in no way detract from its spontaneity, freshness, and general musicality...In some respects serial procedures are suggested."

After hearing news about the String Quartet being recorded, Perle and many others anticipated its release. The first complete recording on the Columbia Masterworks label appeared in 1961. The composer Eric Salzman wrote an enthusiastic review of the Amati Quartet's recording, titled "Distaff Disk. Ruth Seeger's Work Ahead of Its Era"

By default, Seeger played a significant role in sustaining her reputation as a composer. In 1960, he collaborated with CBS Records to produce the first complete recording of the String Quartet 1931. When doing so, he deliberately kept his influence on her work out of it.

The piece was reissued in the 1970s because of the cultural activity associated with the Bicentennial of the American Revolution, and a revival of national interest in American classical music. The cultural feminist movement also contributed to its reemergence.

This attention changed the way Crawford's children regarded their mother's composition, to some degree. Peggy said,

"I don't understand how the woman that I knew as a mother created something like the 1931 string quartet. It is like someone crying; it is like someone beating on the walls...and I don't want to think about this as regarding my mother because my mother always seemed to me to have it all together, to have gotten a life that pleased her."

In 1973, a recording of String Quartet 1931, performed by the Composers Quartet, was released on the Nonesuch label, along with quartets by George Perle and Milton Babbitt. Many New York critics praised it and linked it to contemporary trends. John Rockwell wrote in High Fidelity that it was striking how her techniques anticipated later movements, particularly Elliott Carter's independent part-writing and metrical explorations.

String Quartet 1931 continued to bolster Crawford's reputation as a composer. In 1975, the third movement was performed by the New York Philharmonic at a highly publicized concert. The concert showcased female composers and was sponsored by a feminist publishing collective for Ms. (magazine).

In 1981, Jeannie Pool organized the First National Congress on Women and Music, with Crawford as a focal point. Pool recalls, "I decided the best thing to do was anchor the whole conference around Ruth Crawford Seeger. She was a major composer, and her String Quartet 1931 was a pivotal work done by a woman. If we anchored the conference there, then I would have the ability to present the new works, the new string quartets on her shoulders."

The late 1900s witnessed important developments for female composers. The coverage shifted somewhat, so that String Quartet 1931 was no longer the only piece on which Crawford's historical position was based.

Prior to the 1980s, there had been no mention of Charles Seeger's contributions to Crawford's development. Seeger had been acknowledged for his article on "dissonant counterpoint", and while it was known that he had been her mentor, there had been no connections between his article and her compositional style. In 1986, Mark Nelson analyzed Crawford's String Quartet with regards to Seeger's theories, as did David Nicholls in his book about American experimental music in 1990.

Joseph Straus links the piece to a renewed appreciation of modernism in general, specifically in relation to integral serialism. He said that Crawford had "understood the potential isomorphism of pitch and rhythm and in that sense, had 'serialized the rhythm' of the piece", but the rhythms were not actually serialized in any consistent or systematic way. He praised her nonetheless, saying that it happened often enough in her music to clearly suggest that she is aware that those musical motives can be done to both rhythm and pitch.
