= Haroun and the Sea of Stories =

1990 Children's book by Salman Rushdie

- Cover of the first edition
- Author: Salman Rushdie
- Language: English
- Genre: Magic realism
- Publisher: Granta
- Publication date: 27 September 1990
- Publication place: United Kingdom
- Media type: Print (hardback & paperback)
- Pages: 224
- ISBN: 978-0-14-014223-5
- OCLC: 22274689
- Dewey Decimal: 823/.914 20
- LC Class: PR6068.U757 H37 1990
- Followed by: Luka and the Fire of Life

Haroun and the Sea of Stories is a 1990 children's novel by Salman Rushdie. It is Rushdie's fifth major publication and followed The Satanic Verses (1988). It is a phantasmagorical story that begins in a city so miserable and ruinous that it has forgotten its name.

Haroun and the Sea of Stories is an allegory for problems existing in society at the time of its publication, especially in the Indian subcontinent. It presents these problems from the perspective of the young protagonist, Haroun. Salman Rushdie dedicated this book to his son, from whom he was separated for some time. Many elements of the story deal with the problems of censorship, an issue particularly pertinent to Rushdie because of the fatwa against him issued in 1989 by Ayatollah Khomeini. The book is highly allusive and contains puns in multiple languages. Many of the major characters' names allude to some aspect of speech or silence.

It is available as an audiobook read by Rushdie himself.

== Plot summary ==
At the beginning of the story, protagonist Haroun Khalifa lives with his father Rashid, a famous storyteller and doctor, and his mother Soraya, until the latter is seduced by their neighbour "Mr. Sengupta" to leave home. Rashid is hired to speak on behalf of local politicians but fails his initial assignment. Rashid and Haroun are taken to the "Valley of K" by courier "Mr. Butt," to speak for "Snooty Buttoo," another politician. Attempting to sleep aboard Buttoo's yacht, Haroun discovers "Iff the Water Genie," assigned to detach Rashid's imagination, and demands to speak with Iff's supervisor, the Walrus, to argue against this decision. They are then carried to the eponymous "Sea of Stories" by an artificial intelligence in the form of a hoopoe, nicknamed "Butt" after the courier. In the Sea of Stories, Haroun learns the Sea is endangered by antagonist "Khattam-Shud," who represents the end.

In the Kingdom of Gup, King Chattergy, Prince Bolo, General Kitab, and the Walrus announce their plans for war against the neighbouring kingdom of Chup, to recapture Bolo's betrothed Princess Batcheat and to stop the pollution of the Sea of Stories. Rashid joins them here, having witnessed Batcheat's kidnapping. Thereafter, Haroun and his companions join the Guppee army of "Pages" toward Chup, where they befriend Mudra, Khattam-Shud's former second-in-command.

Haroun, Iff, Butt the Hoopoe, and Mali, the stories' gardener, investigate the Sea's "Old Zone" and are captured by Khattam-Shud's animated shadow, who plans to plug the Story Source at the bottom of the Sea. Before he can do so, Mali destroys the machines used by Khattam-Shud to poison the Sea, and Haroun restores the Sea's long-annulled alternation between night and day, thus destroying the antagonist's shadow and those assisting him, and diverting the giant "Plug" meant to seal the Source. In Chup, the Guppee army destroys the Chupwalas' army and releases Princess Batcheat; whereupon Khattam-Shud himself is crushed beneath a collapsing statue commissioned by himself. Thereafter the Walrus promises Haroun a happy ending of his own story. On return to the human world, Rashid reveals Haroun's adventures to local citizens, who expel Snooty Buttoo. And they all lived happily ever after.

When Rashid and Haroun return home, the people of their city are loosened from the shackles of their misery and remember the name of their home, Kahani. Soraya returns to her son and husband.

The novel concludes with an appendix explaining the meaning of each major character's name.

== Places ==
- A work of magic realism, the story begins and takes place partly in "a sad city" which is located beside "a mournful sea full of glumfish," which were so miserable to eat that they made people "belch with melancholy." This city is thickly populated by people, of whom only the lead character Haroun and his parents are ever happy, while in the north of the city are factories wherein sadness is allegedly manufactured and exported. The factories produce air pollution that is only relieved during rain, which also heralds the arrival of pomfret into the nearby waters.
- Most of the Earthly locations present in the book are located in the fictional nation of Alifbay, which is a combination of first two letters of the Arabic script based Urdu alphabet, Alif and Bay, and therefore contains many places named after letters, such as the "Valley of K" and the "Tunnel of I (which was also known as J)."
- In the center of the Valley of K is the Dull Lake, which is said in the novel's appendix to be named after the Dal Lake in Kashmir. This implies that Kashmir is the place on which K is based. The Dull Lake itself is the location of the Moody Land, a landscape whose weather changes to reflect the emotions of the people currently present in it.
- The larger part of the plot occurs on a fictional moon of Earth, named Kahani, whose orbit is controlled by a "Process Too Complicated To Explain" also referred to in the book as the "P2C2E." These processes enable it to fly over every single point on Earth like a satellite. Kahani consists of a massive ocean, which is composed of an infinite number of stories, each story taking the form of a current or stream of a unique colour. The colours encompass the whole visible spectrum and extend beyond into spectra that are not known to exist. The name "Kahani" itself means "Story" in Urdu and Hindi, and is ultimately revealed to be the name of the sad city; a revelation that removes the sadness from the city's people.
- The Moon Kahani is, throughout most of the plot, divided into two sections equal in size, one of which is kept in perpetual daylight and the other in perpetual darkness. The two are separated by a narrow strip of twilight, which is marked by a forcefield named Chattergy's Wall. The daylight side is called Gup, a Hindi and Urdu word (meaning "gossip," "nonsense," or "fib" in English) and the night-darkened side is called Chup (meaning "quiet"). Inhabitants of Gup value speech and are called "Guppees," meaning "talkative people," while inhabitants of Chup are stated to have historically valued silence and are called "Chupwalas," meaning "quiet fellows." At the South Pole of Kahani is a spring known as the Source of Stories, from which originated all stories ever communicated. The prevention of this spring's blockage, therefore, forms the climax of the novel's plot. Much of the plot on the Moon Kahani can be seen as depicting the contrast between a liberal society and dictatorship.

== Characters ==
- Haroun: The main character/central consciousness of the story. A young, curious, courageous, outspoken child. He struggles throughout most of the story with a form of attention-deficit disorder caused by his mother running away with Mr. Sengupta at exactly eleven o'clock, and under its influence, he is unable to concentrate for a longer period of time. But he eventually overcomes his disorder at the climax, never to suffer from it again. He and his father are both named after the "legendary Caliph of Baghdad, Haroun al-Rashid, who features in many Arabian Nights tales. Their surname Khalifa actually means Caliph."
- Rashid: Haroun's father, known as the Shah of Blah and the Ocean of Notions for his ability to devise stories impromptu, Rashid is a professional storyteller sometimes hired by corrupt politicians to persuade constituents in their favor. His attachment to his wife and to his practice of storytelling is probably his greatest psychological weaknesses; when either of them is lost, he becomes depressed and tends to lose the other. In the story, to recover the latter, he travels to Kahani by means known as "Rapture," through which he is able to travel inside his dreams and wake up in the world, his dream has created.
- Soraya: Haroun's mother and Rashid's wife, who is tired of his imagination and leaves him for the dull and dreary Mr. Sengupta. In the end, she returns to Rashid and revives her affection for her husband and son. Upon her return, the depression overwhelming Rashid and the syndrome manifested by Haroun do not reappear.
- Mr. Sengupta: Haroun's neighbour, who elopes with Soraya. As a rule, Mr. Sengupta despises imagination and stories, which sets the stage for his later appearance on Kahani as antagonist Khattam-Shud. Khattam-Shud's. His name is a legitimate Bengali surname.
- Miss Oneeta: Mr. Sengupta's obese, talkative, self-important, overwhelmingly emotional, generous wife, disappointed in her husband after he has eloped with Soraya. In her dismay, she disowns him and her married name. It is she who reveals that Soraya has deserted her family and that her act has given Haroun his disorder, and also announces her return.
- Mr. Butt: The mail courier, a reckless driver who, when requested to provide transport for Haroun and Rashid (who is expected to speak at an election of public officers), ignores all other demands to take them to their destination before dusk.
- Snooty Buttoo: A corrupt politician who hires Rashid to convince constituents that he (Buttoo) should be re-elected. Buttoo is a class-conscious, pompous, arrogant, self-assured person whose chief hold over his constituents is that he has been re-elected before. To persuade Rashid to sympathize with him, he offers both Rashid and Haroun a stay on a luxurious houseboat called "The Arabian Nights Plus One." He is ultimately driven from his district by popular demand.
- Butt the Hoopoe: A mechanical Hoopoe who becomes Haroun's steed in Kahani, capable of almost all known mental feats, including telepathy (the latter producing a recurrent joke that he "spoke without moving [his] beak"). He is also capable of flying at impossible speeds, between Earth and Kahani.
- Iff: A "water genie" from Kahani who accompanies Haroun in Kahani. Iff's task is to control Rashid's imagination, in the form of waters transmitted to Rashid via an invisible faucet. Iff himself is a benevolent character having a blue moustache and beard; an effusive, somewhat cantankerous personality; and a habit of speaking in lists of synonyms.
- Prince Bolo: A possible parody of the archetypal awe-inspiring hero or Prince Charming, Bolo is a reckless, slightly stupid, melodramatic figure, nominally the leader of the charge to rescue Princess Batcheat from Chup, but holding little authority; prone to becoming excited at the least provocation; and obsessed with rescuing Batcheat, so that all other things appear to him of little significance.
- Princess Batcheat: A damsel in distress. Batcheat is the daughter of King Chattergy, ruler of Gup, and the fiancée of Prince Bolo. She is somewhat foolish; sentimental; reckless; and completely infatuated with Bolo, who is the only person to think her beautiful. Her name is pronounced "Baat-cheat," which is translated as "conversation." When Princess Batcheat is captured by Chupwalas during an excursion to the border between Gup and Chup, they plot to sew her mouth shut and rename her Khamosh, meaning "silent," but they never carry this out.
- General Kitab: Literally "General Book," General Kitab is the commander of the Guppee Army, called the "Library." It consists of a multitude of Pages. The General participates in every debate regarding the worth of the cause on which the army has embarked, and frequently forms such debates on purpose to resolve all conflict of interest or opinion. The whole army, therefore, takes part in every campaign of Rogerian argument, whose sole aim is to produce conciliation and eventual unity among the Pages. Because Guppee laws permit unlimited freedom of speech, these debates are unrestrained to an extent that would (as Haroun remarks) be considered insubordination in the reader's world.
- King Chattergy: Princess Batcheat's father and Prince Bolo's father-in-law, who forms the nominal head of Gup's government but has little real power. He is given very little role in most of the story.
- Blabbermouth: A female Page of the Library of Gup. Blabbermouth is a talkative, ill-tempered, stubborn, unscrupulous, quarrelsome and courageous girl who despises Princess Batcheat, disguises herself as a boy (due to lack of equal rights for girls), and is skilled at the art of juggling. Blabbermouth joins the army of Gup to march on Chup. She saves many lives by impeding a bomb attack attempted by Khattam-Shud's ambassador. Thereupon she is exposed as a girl and expelled from the army by Bolo. She then becomes an aide to Mudra, an ally of the Guppees, with whom she is implied to be infatuated.
- Mudra: Second-in-command to Khattam-Shud, who becomes disgruntled with his master's policies and defects to the Guppee side. His shadow, like the shadows of each and every person in Chup, can behave independently of himself and is, therefore, his sidekick. Mudra himself is an able warrior skilled in the art of hand-to-hand combat. Mudra is nearly mute, being able only to communicate his own name and that he "speaks" by Abhinaya, the sign language used in classical Indian dance. His own name is said in the appendix to be the generic term for all signs used in this language. After the climax, Mudra becomes President of Chup.
- Khattam-Shud: The villain of the story, whose name means "completely finished." As a character, he is the "Prince of Silence and the Foe of Speech" feared by most Guppees. He is the ruthless ruler of Chup and in some sense the Kahanian counterpart of Mr. Sengupta. Khattam-Shud is the founder of a religion whose supreme commandment is abstinence from speech. In Chup City, schools, law-courts, and theaters had to close. Khattam-Shud tries to poison the Sea so that all stories go wrong and come to a bad end.
- The Eggheads: Here, the technicians of Kahani: white-coated, completely bald, enthusiastic, cheerful, and intelligent. The Eggheads of Gup City are said to be the inventors of all "Processes Too Complicated To Explain," by which impossible feats such as Kahani's bizarre orbit, the creation of artificial happy endings for stories, and the transmission of "story water" to Earthly storytellers are easily accomplished. They are in awe of their superintendent, the Walrus, for his possession of a moustache.
- Walrus: The superintendent of the Eggheads, distinguished from them by his possession of a small moustache that gives him his name.
- Plentimaw Fish: Angelfish the size of giant sharks. The name is derived from their multiplicity of mouths, through which they constantly ingest the stories conveyed by the waters. Inside their bodies, the stories combine to form new stories.
- Mali: A "Floating Gardener" composed of interwoven flowering vines and water plants that behave as a single organism. He is one of many, whose task is to prevent stories from becoming irretrievably convoluted and to cut away weeds on the Ocean's surface. Floating Gardeners are divided into a hierarchy of classes, of which Mali belongs to the First Class, presumably the highest. Mali, and presumably other Floating Gardeners, is virtually invulnerable, being able to withstand any and all attacks made against him by the Chupwalas.

== Allusions/references to other works ==
- "Sea of the Rivers of Story" is the English equivalent of Kathāsaritsāgara, the title of an 11th-century collection of Indian legends.
- Elements of the story are indicated to have been drawn from Baum's The Wizard of Oz, Tolkien's The Lord of the Rings, and Lewis Carroll's Alice's Adventures in Wonderland, as well as having been compared to the popular children's novel The Phantom Tollbooth.
- Another obvious reference is to the stories of One Thousand and One Nights. Haroun, the son of Rashid Khalifa refers to Harun al-Rashid, a caliph who ruled from 786 to 809 and who features frequently in Thousand and One Nights stories.
- "Iff the Water Genie" is a reference to the genie in "Aladdin's Magic Lamp." Haroun steals Iff's magic wrench, and as a result, Iff is forced to do Haroun's bidding, just as the genie did when Aladdin came into possession of the magic lamp.
- The Walrus plays off of The Beatles song "I Am the Walrus" and Lewis Carroll's "The Walrus and the Carpenter."
- When the character Mudra is first encountered, the noises he emits are the gurgling sound "Gogogol" and the coughing noise "Kafkafka," as references to writers Nikolai Gogol and Franz Kafka, whose names they are distorting. Rushdie makes another reference to Kafka when Iff describes the Plentimaw Fish in the sea, who swallow stories, as hungry artists.
- A reference is made to the folktale Rapunzel in the book's fourth chapter.
- Haroun encounters a warrior who is fighting his own shadow. This is possibly a reference to J. M. Barrie's Peter Pan.
- "Goopy" and "Bagha," the names of the Plentimaws, allude to the characters Goopy and Bagha created by Bengali author Upendrakishore Ray Chowdhury. His grandson, the Academy Award-winning director Satyajit Ray, directed two films with Goopy and Bagha as protagonists.

== Adaptations ==
- A play based on the book was adapted for the stage by Tim Supple and David Tushingham.
- An opera, Haroun and the Sea of Stories, by Charles Wuorinen with libretto by James Fenton, written in 2001, was premiered at the New York City Opera in Fall 2004.
