= Sope =

Sope may refer to:

== People ==
- Barak Sopé (born 1951), Vanuatu politician
- Sope Aluko (born 1975), Nigerian-born British American actress
- Sope Dirisu (born 1991), British Nigerian actor
- Sope Johnson
- Sope Willams Elegbe (born 1975), Nigerian professor of law

== Places ==
- Sope Creek, United States
- Sope Lake, Albania

== Other ==
- Sope (band), a South Korean boy band
- Sope (food), a Mexican food
