= All the Wrong Places =

All the Wrong Places may refer to:

- All the Wrong Places (book), 1988 reports from Asia by the English journalist and poet James Fenton
- All the Wrong Places (film), a 2000 American romantic comedy directed by Martin Edwards
- An episode from Australian TV series McLeod's Daughters (season 7) 2007
- All the Wrong Places (novel), a 2019 novel by Joy Fielding
- "All the Wrong Places" (song) a 2013 song by the British rapper Example
- The byline to the song "Lookin' for Love" from the soundtrack of the film Urban Cowboy
