= Time's Encomium =

Studio album by Charles Wuorinen
- Released: 1969
- Recorded: January 1968–January 1969
- Studios: Columbia-Princeton Electronic Music Center, New York
- Length: 31:40
- Label: Nonesuch Records

Time's Encomium (1968–1969) is a quadraphonic electronic composition by Charles Wuorinen. Released on LP by Nonesuch Records in 1969, the composition was commissioned for the label by Teresa Sterne.

The work was realized on the RCA Mark II Sound Synthesizer at the Columbia-Princeton Electronic Music Center in Manhattan. It was awarded the 1970 Pulitzer Prize for Music, making it the first electronic composition to win the prize and Wuorinen the youngest winning composer at that time.

Time's Encomium is the title because in this work everything depends on the absolute, not the seeming, length of events and sections. Being electronic, Time's Encomium has no inflective dimension. Its rhythm is always quantitative, never qualitative. Because I need time, I praise it; hence the title. Because it doesn't need me, I approach it respectively; hence the word 'encomium'.

— Charles Wuorinen

According to the composer, the primary concern of the piece appears to be rhythmic, since only pure quantitative duration, as opposed to qualitative performance variable inflection, is available to one in the electronic medium, though "the basic materials are the twelve tempered pitch classes, and pitch-derived time relations." As such, he composed "with a view to the proportions among absolute lengths of events -- be they small (note-to-note distances) or large (overall form) -- rather than to their relative 'weights,'....conform[ing] to the basic nature of a medium in which sound is always reproduced, never performed."

Wuorinen's Contrafactum for orchestra (1969) was developed from some of the same materials as Time's Encomium, as well as discarded portions of the earlier work. The original electronic work was later remastered and rereleased on Tzadik Records.
