= The Celestial Sphere =

The Celestial Sphere is a large scale oratorio for chorus and orchestra by Charles Wuorinen, commissioned by Augustana College (Rock Island, Illinois) for the 100th anniversary of the Handel Oratorio Society, which gave the premiere performance on 25 April 1981 under the direction of Donald Morrison, conductor.

The composition was written from January 2 to September 9, 1980, in Baltimore, Binghamton (NY), Buffalo (NY), Gardiner (MA), Iowa City (IA), Jackson Hole (WY), Los Angeles, Middle Valley (NJ), New York City, Rock Island (IL), and San Francisco. The score is published by C.F. Peters, EP 66851. Texts from William Fuller's "Lord, What Is Man?" (1693), Acts of the Apostles. Wuorinen's full title is The Celestial Sphere / An Oratorio / For Mixed Chorus / And Orchestra / Containing: I. Symphony About the Empyrean / Lord, What is Man (William Fuller, 1693) (Solemn Setting) / II. Symphony About the Ascension / The Ascension (Acts) / III. Symphony About the Holy Ghost / The Pentecost (Acts) / IV. Second Symphony About the Empyrean / Lord, What is Man (Joyous Setting).

Part II of the work contains an optional two minute electronic tape part which may be used at one point (Pentecost) where there is a provision for a two-minute interlude. The tape part (created at Bell Labs) can be replaced by silence if desired. Wuorinen's Ecclesiastical Symphonies are the purely orchestral movements of this work.
