= Haroun and the Sea of Stories (opera) =

Opera by Charles Wuorinen

- Opera by Charles Wuorinen
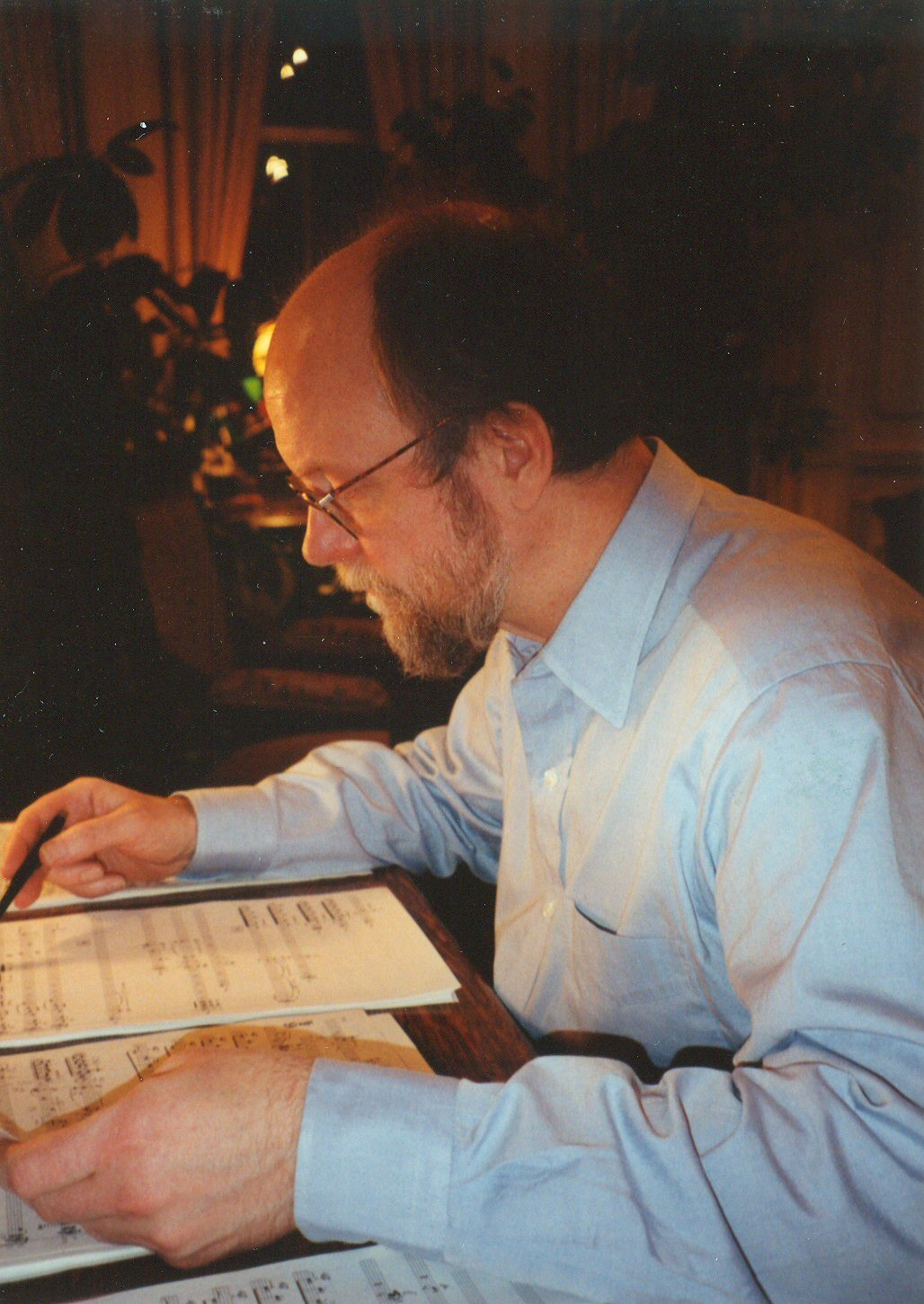
- The composer in the 1980s
- Librettist: James Fenton
- Language: English
- Based on: Haroun and the Sea of Stories by Salman Rushdie
- Premiere: October 31, 2004; New York City Opera
- Website: www.charleswuorinen.com/operas/haroun-and-the-sea-of-stories/

Haroun and the Sea of Stories is an opera in two acts by American composer Charles Wuorinen, based on the children's novel of the same name by Salman Rushdie, with a libretto by James Fenton. It was premiered at the New York City Opera in 2004.

== History ==
Salman Rushdie wrote Haroun and the Sea of Stories as a short novel for his son Zafar, then aged eleven. It was Rushdie's first book after he had to hide because of a fatwa call for his death. It was published in 1990. Charles Wuorinen was attracted by both the plot, and the circumstances of the story's writing, admiring the absence of self-pity. He found James Fenton to write him a libretto. Fenton had translated Verdi librettos for the English National Opera, but Haroun was his first libretto. He created a number opera, reducing the characters and adding to its political meaning. Wuorinen composed the opera in two acts, including musical quotes and "musical puns", to emphasize Rushdie's wordplay.

Excerpts from the opera were performed at the New York Cooper Union on May 2, 2000, by the New York City Opera. The world premiere was planned for 2001, but was postponed after the September 11 attacks. The complete opera was premiered on October 31, 2004, at the New York City Opera, directed by Mark Lamos, and conducted by George Manahan, with stage design by Riccardo Hernandez. Heather Buck appeared in the title role, and Peter Strummer as Rashid.

The opera was published by Edition Peters. The libretto appeared as part of a collection of Fenton's librettos, The Love Bomb and Other Musical Pieces by Faber and Faber in 2003. The Boston Modern Orchestra Project produced a concert version of the opera, but with costumes and projections, in 2019.

== Roles ==
Role	Voice type	Premiere cast, October 31, 2004 Conductor: George Manahan
Haroun	soprano	Heather Buck
Rashid	baritone	Peter Strummer
Soraya, mother to Haroun	mezzo-soprano	Heather Johnson
Mr. Sengupta, a measlyweasly clerk, and later Khattam-Shud, the prince of silence	tenor	James Schaffner
Oneeta, wife to Mr. Sengupta, and then Princess, and later Princess Batcheat	contralto	Edith Dowd, Kathryn Friest
Butt, the Bus-driver, and later the mechanical Hoopoe	bass	Ethan Herschenfeld
Snooty Buttoo, politician	tenor	Joel Sorensen
Iff, the water genie	tenor	Ryan MacPherson
Bagha and Goopy, plentimaw fish	high tenors	Andrew Drost Goopy, Robert Mack
Mali, a gardener	deep bass	Wilber Pauley
Prince Bolo, beloved of Batcheat	tenor	Christopher Jackson
General Kitab	baritone	Michael Zegarski
The King (can de doubled with Mali)	bass	

== Plot ==
The main characters are Haroun, a boy, and his father, the storyteller Rashid, who lost his ability to tell stories after his wife left him, and the villains Khattam-shud and Snooty Buttoo who want to terminate storytelling because they want to rule the world, and are powerless against stories. In a fantastic journey, Haroun helps his father to regain his potential.

== Reception ==
Charles Michener of The Observer noted that reading the libretto was enjoyable, but found the music too "earthbound", although with adequate clean and forceful lines for the singers. He noted the composer's "command of organized noise". Peter G. Davis wrote in New York magazine:

But the score for Haroun will dazzle any receptive ear with its incredibly broad palate of finely tuned sounds and its irrepressible vitality—a singularly apt musical response to a sophisticated children’s novel that has very adult things to say about a free imagination trapped in a world of oppressive thought control.
