= Lichfield Theological College =

College in Lichfield, England

Coordinates: 52°41′06″N 1°49′52″W

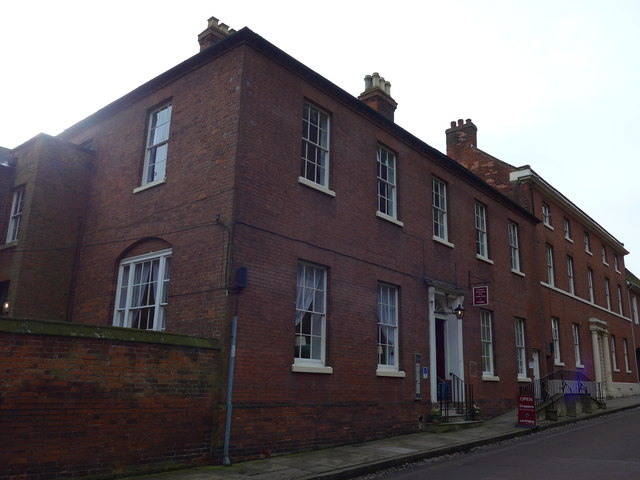
Cathedral Close Lichfield (formerly Lichfield Theological College)

Lichfield Theological College was founded in 1857 to train Anglican clergy to serve in the Church of England. Uniquely at its foundation, the college did not require a degree, and non-graduates made up the majority of its ordinands. The college had "high church tendencies". It was located on the south side of the Cathedral Close in Lichfield, Staffordshire and closed in 1972.

== Notable staff ==
- Cecil Cherrington, lecturer, later Bishop of Waikato, New Zealand
- George Kilpatrick, lecturer, later Dean Ireland's Professor of the Exegesis of Holy Scripture at the University of Oxford
- Barry Rogerson, lecturer, later Bishop of Bristol
- James Srawley, Vice-Principal, later Canon of Lincoln Cathedral

=== List of Principals ===
- 1880–1885: George Herbert Moberly
- 1909-1931: Lawrence Arthur Phillips
- 1958–1965: John Fenton
- 1966–1972: John Yates

== Notable alumni ==
- John Barker, Dean of Cloyne in the Church of Ireland
- French Chang-Him, Bishop of The Seychelles and Archbishop of the Indian Ocean
- Mervyn Charles-Edwards, Bishop of Worcester
- Malcolm Clark, Dean of Edinburgh
- Robert Hodson, Bishop of Shrewsbury
- Sope Johnson, Provost of the Cathedral Church of Christ, Lagos
- Hope Patten, Anglo-Catholic priest known for his restoration of the Anglican Shrine of Our Lady of Walsingham
- John Simkin, Bishop of Auckland, New Zealand
- Horace Tonks, Bishop of the Windward Islands
- Frank Weston, Bishop of Knaresborough
