= Horace Tonks =

Horace Norman Vincent Tonks (29 January 1891 – 25 November 1959) was an Anglican colonial bishop in the Windward Islands from 1936 until 1949.

He was born in Walsall, England, on 29 January 1891 to Henry and Emily Tonks and educated at the town's Queen Mary's Grammar School and Lichfield Theological College. Ordained in 1918 after a curacy in Fenton, he was priest in charge of Holy Cross, Airedale, then from 1926 to 1935 the vicar of Saint Sampson with Holy Trinity in York. After that he was Archdeacon of Grenada for a brief period in 1935 and 1936 before his appointment to the episcopate in the Windward Islands. On his return to England, he was Rector of Leybourne in Kent from 1949 to 1956. He died on 25 November 1959.

== Family ==
In 1921, he married Alice Underwood. They had three sons and two daughters.
