= Darryl Pinckney =

American novelist, playwright, and essayist (born 1953)

- Born: 1953 (age 72–73); Indianapolis, Indiana, U.S.
- Education: Columbia University (BA)
- Partner: James Fenton
- Writing career
- Genres: Novelist, playwright
- Notable work: High Cotton (1992)
- Notable awards: Whiting Award (1986); Vursell Award for Distinguished Prose from the American Academy of Arts and Letters (1994)
- Website: darrylpinckney.com

Darryl Pinckney (born 1953 in Indianapolis, Indiana) is an American novelist, playwright, and essayist.

== Early life ==
Pinckney grew up in a middle-class African-American family in Indianapolis, Indiana, where he attended local public schools and graduated from North Central High School (Indianapolis). He was educated at Columbia University in New York City.

== Career ==
Some of Pinckney's first professional works were theatre texts, plays developed in collaboration with director Robert Wilson. These included the produced works of The Forest (1988) and Orlando (1989). Pinckney returned to theatre with Time Rocker (1995).

His first book was High Cotton (1992), a semi-autobiographical novel about "growing up black and bourgeois" in 1960s America. His second novel was Black Deutschland (2016), about a young gay black man in Berlin, Germany, in the late 1980s, just before the fall of the Berlin Wall.

Pinckney has published several collections of essays covering topics such as African-American literature, politics, race, and other cultural issues. He is also a frequent contributor to the New York Review of Books, Granta, Slate, and The Nation. He frequently explores issues of racial and sexual identities, as expressed in literature and society.

Pinckney's memoir Come Back in September was published in 2022. Rachel Cooke in an interview for The Observer described reading it as "like being at a particularly fabulous literary party. ...But the real star of the show – the book's constant and slightly terrifying presence – is the critic and novelist Elizabeth Hardwick, Pinckney’s friend of more than three decades and the key that first turned the lock on his exciting New York life."

== Awards ==
- 1986, Whiting Award
- 1992, High Cotton won the Los Angeles Times Art Seidenbaum Award for First Fiction.
- 1994, the Vursell Award for Distinguished Prose from the American Academy of Arts and Letters
- 2022, Come Back in September was a finalist for the 2023 National Book Critics Circle Award for Memoir and Autobiography.
- 2022, James Tait Black Prize for Biography for Come Back in September

== Personal life ==
Pinckney is gay and lives with his partner, English poet James Fenton; the couple has been together since 1989. Pinckney currently lives in New York City, but previously lived with Fenton in Oxfordshire, England.

== Bibliography ==
=== Books ===
- High Cotton (novel; 1992)
- Sold and Gone: African American Literature and U.S. Society (2001)
- Out There: Mavericks of Black Literature (2002)
- Blackballed: The Black Vote and US Democracy (2014)
- Black Deutschland (2016)
- Busted in New York and Other Essays (2019; foreword by Zadie Smith)
- Come Back in September: A Literary Education on West Sixty-seventh Street, Manhattan (2022)

=== Selected essays ===
- "England, Whose England?". Granta (16: Science). Summer 1985. (Subscription Required)
- "Lonely Hearts Club". Harper's. Vol. February 2010. February 2010.
- "The Ethics of Admiration: Arendt, McCarthy, Hardwick, Sontag". The Threepenny Review. 135. Fall 2013.
- "Some Different Ways of Looking at Selma". The New York Review of Books. 62 (3). February 19, 2015.
- "Escaping Blackness". The New York Review of Books. 67 (5). March 26, 2020.
- "'We Must Act Out Our Freedom'". The New York Review of Books. 67 (13). August 20, 2020.
- "A Society on the Verge of a Nervous Breakdown". The New York Review of Books. 67 (17). November 5, 2020.

=== Theatre texts ===
- (Collaborations with Robert Wilson)
  - The Forest (1988)
  - Orlando (1989)
  - Time Rocker (1995)
  - Garrincha - a street opera (2016)
  - Mary Said What She Said (2019)
  - Dorian (2022)
  - Pessoa: since I've been me (2024)
