= John Fenton (priest) =

The Reverend Canon John Fenton
- Principal of St Chad's College, Durham
- Church: Church of England
- Diocese: Diocese of Durham
- In office: 1965 to 1978
- Predecessor: Theodore S. Wetherall
- Successor: Ronald C. Trounson
- Other posts: Canon of Christ Church, Oxford (1978–1991); Principal of Lichfield Theological College (1958–1965)

Personal details
- Born: John Charles Fenton; 5 June 1921 Liverpool, England
- Died: 27 December 2008 (aged 87)
- Denomination: Anglicanism
- Children: James Fenton

John Charles Fenton (5 June 1921 – 27 December 2008) was a British Church of England priest and New Testament scholar. He was Principal of Lichfield Theological College from 1958 to 1965, Principal of St Chad's College, Durham University from 1965 to 1978, and a Canon of Christ Church, Oxford, from 1978 to 1991.

== Early life and education ==
Fenton was born on 5 June 1921 in Liverpool, England, to Cornelius O'Connor Fenton and his wife Agnes Claudina Fenton (née Ingoldby). His father was a vicar. He was educated at St Edward's School, then an all-boys private boarding school in Oxford.

In 1940, he matriculated at Queen's College, Oxford to study theology. He was taught by the college chaplain, V. K. Johnson, and the New Testament by R. H. Lightfoot. He had come to Oxford a staunch Anglo-Catholic, but had his horizons broadened and was strongly influenced by the theology of Søren Kierkegaard. He graduated from the University of Oxford with a Bachelor of Arts (BA) degree in 1943: as per tradition, his BA was promoted to a Master of Arts (MA Oxon) degree in 1947. Then, from 1943 to 1944, he trained for Holy Orders at Lincoln Theological College, a Church of England theological college in the Central tradition.

== Career ==
Fenton's ecclesiastical career was mainly focused on teaching and working within the Church of England's theological colleges. However, he also served in parish ministry, and wrote a substantial number of books for academic and general audiences.

Fenton was ordained in the Church of England as a deacon in 1944 and as a priest in 1945. He served his curacy at All Saints Church, Hindley in the Diocese of Liverpool from 1944 to 1947. He then returned to Lincoln Theological College, where he had trained for ordination, having been appointed its chaplain in 1947 and promoted to sub-warden in 1951. At the college, he taught mainly on the New Testament. He returned to parish ministry, and was Vicar of Wentworth in the Diocese of Sheffield between 1954 and 1958.

In 1958, Fenton began his career as a senior member of the church hierarchy, having been appointed Principal of Lincoln Theological College. Lincoln was a community of both young more mature ordinands: in addition to teaching them the New Testament, he saw it as his duty to challenge their faith. In 1965, he left Lincoln for the last time having been appointed Principal of St Chad's College, Durham, which was both a theological college and a college of the university. During his time in charge of St Chad's, the college ceased its formal training of ordinands for the Church of England, and he led its integration into the wider university with students reading for all degrees offered by Durham University.

Fenton's final appointment was as a canon residentiary of Christ Church Cathedral, Oxford in 1978: Christ Church Cathedral has a dual role as cathedral of the Diocese of Oxford and the college chapel of Christ Church, a college of the University of Oxford. As sub-dean, he was tasked with leading the daily cycle of worship at the cathedral and also its administration; the dean was then free to run the university college. In addition to his clergy role, he taught the New Testament to the university's students, taking "as many as 30 tutorials a week". Fenton retired from full-time ministry in 1991 and was made a student emeritus of Christ Church ("student" is the college's name for its fellows).

=== Views ===
Fenton's Christianity was originally a form of "extreme Anglo-Catholicism". This changed during his university studies where he was introduced to modern biblical criticism.

A scholar of the New Testament, he did not subscribe to Biblical literalism: "he understood the Gospels to consist largely of the teaching material of the earliest Christian communities, rather than historical or biographical fact". He believed that layers of later hands had to be stripped back from the Bible, and that the first-century context of Christ's teaching had to be recognised to truly understand them.

== Personal life ==
In 1945, Fenton married Mary (née Ingoldby). Together they had four children: two boys and two girls. One of their sons is the poet James Fenton. Mary died in 1960. In 1963, he married Linda Brandham. Together they had three children: one daughter and two sons.

== Works ==
=== Books ===
- Fenton, John C. (1958). Preaching the Cross: the Passion and Resurrection according to St. Mark. London: S.P.C.K. OCLC 222910506.
- ——— (1961). The Passion According to John: with introduction, notes, and meditations. London: S.P.C.K. OCLC 6129903.
- ——— (1963). The Gospel of St. Matthew. Pelican Gospel Commentaries. Harmondsworth, UK: Penguin. ISBN 9780140204889. OCLC 851204559.
- ——— (1970). The Gospel According to John in the Revised Standard Version. New Clarendon Bible, New Testament. Oxford: Clarendon Press. ISBN 9780198369080. OCLC 120302.
- ——— (1971). What was Jesus' Message?. Studies in creative criticism. Vol. 2. London: S.P.C.K. ISBN 9780281026210. OCLC 1236115.
- ———; Duke, Michael Hare (1976). Good News. London: SCM Press. ISBN 9780334005889. OCLC 3405192.
- ——— (1995). Finding the Way Through John (2nd ed.). London: Mowbray. ISBN 9780264671420. OCLC 18324967.
- ——— (1995). Finding the Way through Mark. London: Mowbray. ISBN 9780264673806. OCLC 34596334.
- ——— (1995). The Matthew passion : a Lenten journey to the Cross and Resurrection. Oxford: Bible Reading Fellowship. ISBN 9780745932538. OCLC 35135428.
- ——— (1999). Galatians and 1 & 2 Thessalonians. People's Bible commentary. Oxford: Bible Reading Fellowship. ISBN 9781841010120. OCLC 875023050.
- ——— (2001). More about Mark. London: SPCK (Society for Promoting Christian Knowledge). ISBN 0-281-05452-5. (reworkings of previously published essays)

=== Articles and chapters ===
- ——— (April 1952). "Destruction and salvation in the Gospel according to St Mark". Journal of Theological Studies. New Series. 3 (1): 56–58.
- ——— (1953). "Pseudonymity in the New Testament". Theology. 58: 51–56.

Academic offices
Preceded by Theodore S. Wetherall	Principal of St Chad's College; 1965–1978	Succeeded by Ronald C. Trounson
