= Luka and the Fire of Life =

2010 book by Salman Rushdie

- First edition (US)
- Author: Salman Rushdie
- Cover artist: Natee Puttapipat
- Language: English
- Genre: Fiction
- Publisher: Jonathan Cape (UK); Random House (US)
- Publication date: 16 November 2010
- Publication place: United Kingdom
- Pages: 217
- Preceded by: Haroun and the Sea of Stories

Luka and the Fire of Life is a novel by Salman Rushdie. It was published by Jonathan Cape (UK) and Random House (US) in 2010. It is the sequel to Haroun and the Sea of Stories. Rushdie has said "he turned to the world of video games for inspiration" and that "he wrote the book for his 13-year-old son".

== Summary ==
The book opens with protagonist Luka and his father Rashid walking home from Luka's school in the fictional city of Kahani in the land of Alifbay. They pass the Great Rings of Fire circus, where, upon seeing the pitiful state of the animals, Luka yells: "May your animals stop obeying your commands and your rings of fire eat up your stupid tent". (Rushdie 6) Later that day, the animals revolt and the rings of fire consume the tents; and Dog and Bear (a bear and a dog respectively), two animals from the circus, become Luka's faithful pets. (Rushdie 4) One month afterward, Rashid enters a coma, attributed to a curse placed by antagonist 'Captain Aag'. Thereafter, Luka travels through the 'World of Magic' imagined by his father, guided by a phantom-like creature nicknamed 'Nobodaddy', representing Rashid's imminent death. Bear is identified as Barak of the it-Barak (a set of immortal dog-men), turned into a dog by a Chinese curse; and Dog as the monarch of a northern land, transformed by an ogre. All four seek the eponymous 'Fire of Life' to revive Rashid. At the River of Time, which they must follow to find the Fire, they are attacked by the Old Man of the River, who kills Luka. Once revived, Luka realizes that this world will revive him continually until he achieves his purpose, or exceeds his chances of doing so. Luka eventually bests the Old Man in a game of riddles. The protagonists then find a boat but are soon capsized and thereafter carried upriver by the Elephant Ducks: "a pair of absurd creatures with duck-like bodies and large elephant heads" (Rushdie 66).

Later, the group stops at the Respectorate of I, a city ruled by rats insisting on cultural relativism. In leaving this city, Luka accidentally insults the Respectorate's national song but is rescued by the Insultana of Ott (Rushdie 78), whom Luka identifies by his mother's name of Soraya. Accompanied by her, Luka and his companions ride her flying carpet through the Mists of Time and the Great Stagnation. The elephant birds help through the Trillion and One Forking Paths, where the true River of Time is disguised among duplicates. Afterward, they are temporarily detained by the Great Rings of Fire, which Dog and Bear identify as the handiwork of Captain Aag. When Bear and Dog disable this, Aag appears beside Nuthog, a shape-changer in the form of a dragon, but the latter betrays Aag when Soraya frees Nuthog's three sisters. Accompanied by these, the protagonist eludes the gods of various mythologies to obtain the Fire of Life. Trickster-spirit 'Coyote' thereafter distracts the gods while Luka captures the Fire of Life and later persuades the gods to permit his possession thereof. Returning to the human world, they are joined by Prometheus, who assists them past the Mists of Time. They are then captured in the cloud fortress of Baddal-Garh, now under the control of the antagonist 'Aalim' and Nobodaddy, who has betrayed Luka to complete his task of killing Rashid. Prometheus then hurls Nobodaddy into outer space. When the Aalim cause everyone but Luka, Dog, Bear, and Prometheus to collapse in pain, Luka curses the Aalim and the gods destroy the fortress. Luka and his companions continue toward Rashid, the gods defending them from the deadly 'Rain Cats'. Luka revives Rashid, and Bear, challenged by Nobodaddy, sacrifices his own immortality for Rashid's life. The story concludes with the Fire's concealment by Luka's mother, after a celebration by the family.

== Characters ==
- Luka Khalifa, the protagonist of the book, is a twelve-year-old left-handed boy, who goes on a quest to save his dying father. He shows courage throughout the book and has the ability to curse his enemies, such as cursing Captain Aag, which causes his animals to revolt and his tents to burn down.
- Bear, the singing dog, a chocolate Labrador. Identified as Barak of the It-Barak, the immortals changed into dogs by a Chinese curse. Along with Dog he is Luka's faithful protector and pet. Eventually, he sacrifices his immortality to destroy Nobodaddy.
- Dog, the dancing bear, is a mortal bear and Luka's constant companion.
- Nobodaddy is a phantom brought into being to consume Rashid Khalifa. He joins Luka initially to steal the Fire of Life; but betrays him to the Aalim and is thrown into space by Prometheus. He later consumes the immortality of Bear, in exchange for Rashid's life.
- Soraya is the Insultana of Ott, a girl with green eyes and red hair, who assists Luka through the World of Magic, as upon the flying carpet Resham of King Solomon. Although cantankerous, she often shows a sisterly affection to Luka.
- The Aalim, the Ultimate Guardians of the Fire, who rule over the World of Magic and appear as cloaked, faceless figures whose mere voices cause agonising pain to magical beings. In the end, Luka leads the revolt that topples them from power.
- Captain Aag, the owner of the Great Rings of Fire circus, identified as "Menetius... once the Titan of Rage" (Rushdie 123). Antagonist throughout the story, he is often associated with flames and anger. He curses Luka's father, Rashid, to sleep forever.
- Prometheus, the brother of Aag, subjected to torment by the Aalim. Upon release, he helps Luka leave the World of Magic to save his father.
- Coyote, a figure of Native American legend, who distracts the Gods to help give Luka his chance to steal the Fire.
- Haroun Khalifa, Luka's older brother and protagonist of Haroun and the Sea of Stories. He is often kind to Luka.
- Rashid Khalifa, Luka's father who is cursed by Captain Aag to go to sleep forever.
- Soraya Khalifa, Luka's mother.
- Ratshit, classmate of Luka.

== Reception ==
The Pittsburgh Post-Gazette criticised the book, calling it "a hodgepodge of what Mr. Rushdie hopes are clever references to mythology, folklore and popular culture" and adding that it is an "assembly-line story welded together from parts of this and that".

The novel inspired a university animation competition in 2010. Design Week explained: "Sir Salman Rushdie’s new children’s novel, Luka and the Fire of Life, will be brought to life through the animations of four Kingston University students. Rushdie was part of a judging panel which invited ten students from the faculty of art, design and architecture to present ideas for the book". The successful animations were to appear on YouTube and the Random House website.

== Bibliography ==
Rushdie, Salman. Luka and the Fire of Life. New York: Random House, 2010. Print.
