= Sope Johnson =

Nigerian clergyman

Samuel Hugh Stowell Akinsope "Sope" Johnson (March 1930- July 2022) was Provost of the Cathedral Church of Christ, Lagos from 1970 until 1995.

Johnson was educated at King's College, London and Lichfield Theological College. From 1955 to 1962 he gained experience in London as a curate (including two years at St. Martin-in-the Fields) before returning to Nigeria to become the head of religious broadcasting at the Nigerian Broadcasting Corporation.
