= Sope Willams Elegbe =

British-Nigerian law professor and public procurement scholar

Sope Williams Elegbe
- Born: 9 August; Geneva, Switzerland
- Education: University of Lagos London School of Economics University of Nottingham
- Occupation: Professor of Law
- Employer: Stellenbosch University
- Known for: Public Procurement Anti-Corruption
- Notable work: Fighting Corruption in Public Procurement (2012);Public Procurement and Multilateral Development Banks (2017); Public Procurement Regulation for 21st Century Africa (2018); Public Procurement Regulation in Africa: Development in uncertain times (2020).
- Awards: Anti-Corruption Ambassador(UNODC), Open Contracting Partnership Anti-Corruption Champion (2021)

Sope Williams Elegbe is a professor of Law, public procurement scholar, and anti-corruption champion.

She is known for being an advocate for and speaker on Open Governance, Blockchain, Gender–responsive public procurement, integrity and anti-Corruption, and sustainable development.

Sope is a consultant for different governments, the World Bank and is currently on the anti-corruption sub-committee of the International Bar Association in charge of exclusion and debarment In December 2022, she was awarded the prestigious Sheikh Tamim Bin Hamad Al-Thani International Excellence Award for Anti-Corruption Research and Education in recognition of her research, education, and training on anti-corruption law.

== Life ==
She was born in Geneva. She attended Geneva English School and later Home Science Primary School, Ikoyi, for her early education. She was called to the Nigerian Bar, after which she went to the London School of Economics, where she obtained an LLM with distinction.

== Career ==
Sope Williams started her career at the University of Stirling, Scotland, as a lecturer in business law. She later moved to the University of Nottingham and joined the School of Law. In 2008 she was co-opted to work on a project on the World Bank's expert group that helped the Bank reform its procurement process which lasted until 2011. She obtained a PhD in public procurement and anti-corruption law from the University of Nottingham.

In 2016, she moved to South Africa and was appointed a professor of law at Stellenbosch University, South Africa. From 2018 to 2021, she was the Head of the department of Mercantile law, and is currently the deputy director of the African Procurement Law Unit. She is also on the Board of the international NGO- Slave–Free Trade and counter-corruption institute- the Pavocat-Stellenbosch Academy.

== Life and work ==
Her research work is in the area of public procurement, anti-corruption, digitalization of the public sector and sustainable development law, with a focus on human rights and sustainable public procurement and the impact of corruption on sustainable procurement. She is the author of 2 books editor of 4 academic works and over 65 peer-reviewed academic papers. She has consulted for governments within and outside Africa and is the author of several influential policy reports on open government, on anti-corruption and gender responsive procurement.

On February 15, 2016, she trained Nigerian Lawmakers in the House of Assembly on Nigerian public procurement law. Her training highlighted that Nigeria has been defrauded because of the loopholes in the public procurement act and the failure of agencies to enforce the law. Sope Williams, said that a solution was to engage legislative, institutional and organisational changes in public procurement reforms. From 2016 to 2019 she trained over 300 investigators from the South African Office of the Public Protector in investigating public procurement corruption.

Sope is the vice-chair of the Debarment and Exclusion sub-committee of the International Bar Association and a member of Transparency International's Working Group on Debarment and Exclusion. She is also a Fellow at the Public Procurement Research Group, University of Nottingham, and an advisor international institutions and government bodies on procurement and anti-corruption matters who trains the public and the private sector in ethics and anti-corruption law.

She co-runs the LLM and PG Diploma in Public Procurement Policy and Regulation at Stellenbosch University.

In 2024, the South African National Research Foundation rated her to be an “Internationally recognised researcher" with a B1 rating. The Open Contracting Partnership selected her as an anti-corruption champion in 2021. She has been an invited and keynote speaker at over 150 conferences in over 30 countries.

She has published work on Public Procurement, Open Governance, Integrity and Anti-Corruption, WTO Law and Development Law.

== Works ==
- S. Williams, M Krambia Kapardis and LA Kihl (eds) "Routledge Handbook of Gender and Corruption (Routledge, 2026)
- S Williams and J Tillipman (eds) Routledge Handbook of Public Procurement Corruption (Routledge, 2024)
- S Williams-Elegbe Fighting Corruption in Public Procurement (Hart, 2012);
- S Williams-Elegbe Public Procurement and Multilateral Development Banks: Law, Practice and Problems (Bloomsbury/Hart 2017);
- S. Williams-Elegbe and G. Quinot (eds), Public Procurement Regulation for 21st Century Africa (Juta, 2018)
- G. Quinot and S. Williams-Elegbe (eds), Public Procurement Regulation in Africa: Development in uncertain times (Lexis Nexis, 2020).
- Corruption in public procurement is a women's rights issue too, World Bank Blog (8 December 2022). Available at https://blogs.worldbank.org/governance/corruption-public-procurement-womens-rights-issue-too
- Can crisis preparedness prevent corruption in emergency responses? (30 November 2022). Available at https://ace.globalintegrity.org/can-crisis-preparedness-prevent-corruption-in-emergency-responses/
- If we are serious about empowering women in business we need inclusive procurement. Available at https://www.dailymaverick.co.za/article/2021-12-15-if-we-are-serious-about-empowering-women-in-business-we-need-inclusive-procurement/ (December 2021)
- Corruption, procurement and COVID-19 in Africa. Available at https://www.openownership.org/blogs/corruption-procurement-and-covid-19-in-africa/ (June 2020).
- Can human rights be taken into account in contracts funded by the World Bank? Available at https://www.hrprocurementlab.org/blog/ (October 2019).
