= Charles Wuorinen =

American composer (1938–2020)

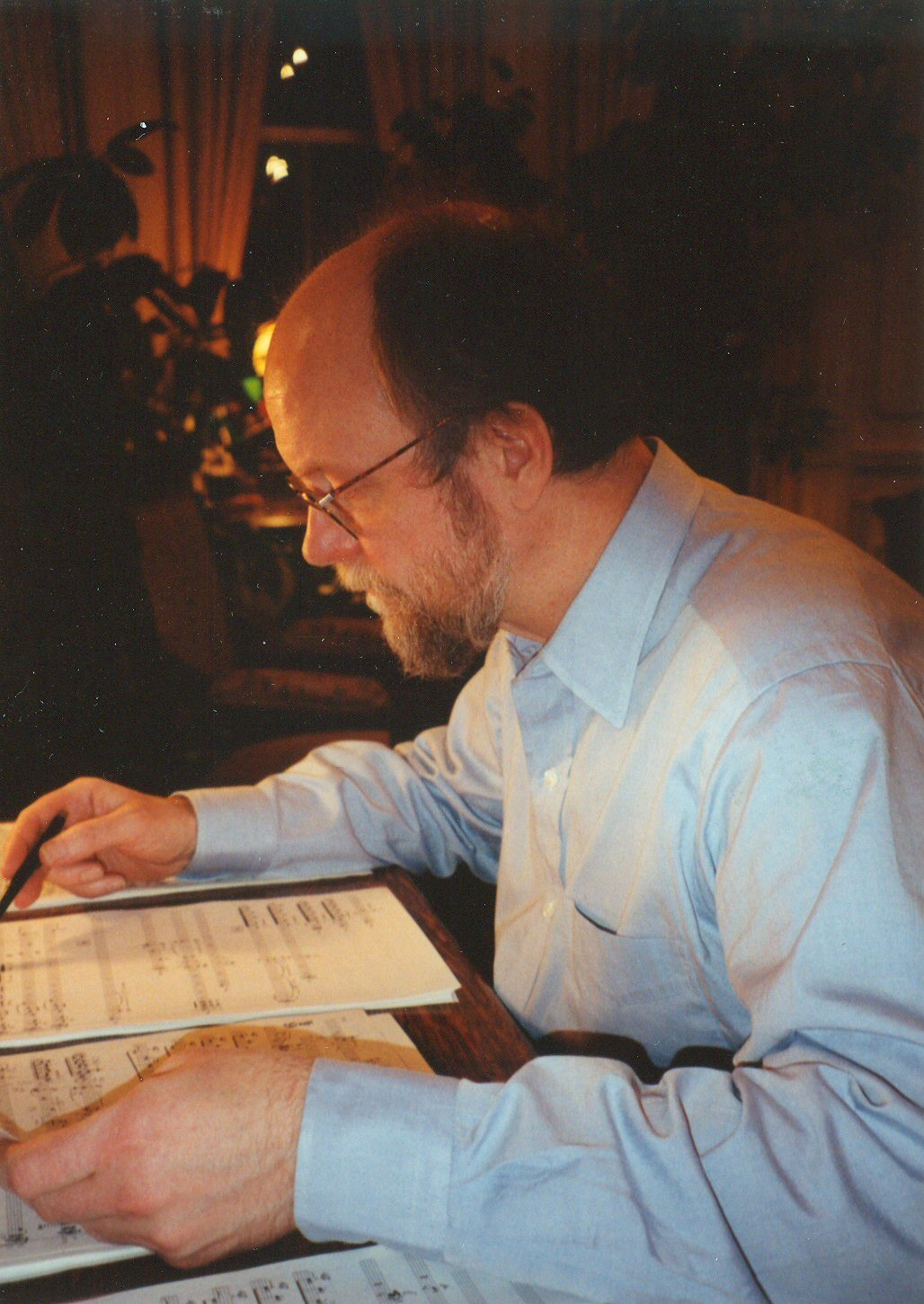
- Charles Wuorinen in the 1990s
- Born: Charles Peter Wuorinen; June 9, 1938; New York City, U.S.
- Died: March 11, 2020 (aged 81); New York City, U.S.
- Education: Columbia University (BA, MA)
- Alma mater: Trinity School
- Occupations: Composer; Academic teacher
- Works: List of compositions
- Awards: Pulitzer Prize

Charles Peter Wuorinen ( /ˈwɔːrɪnən/, Finnish: [ˈʋuorinen]; June 9, 1938 – March 11, 2020) was an American composer of contemporary classical music based in New York City. He also performed as a pianist and conductor. Wuorinen composed more than 270 works: orchestral music, chamber music, solo instrumental and vocal works, and operas, such as Brokeback Mountain (2014). His work was termed serialist but he came to disparage that idea as meaningless. Time's Encomium, his only purely electronic piece, received the 1970 Pulitzer Prize. Wuorinen taught at several institutions, including Columbia University, Rutgers University and the Manhattan School of Music.

== Life and career ==
=== Background ===
Wuorinen was born in New York City on June 9, 1938. His father, John H. Wuorinen, the chair of the Columbia University history department, was a noted scholar of Scandinavian affairs who also worked for the Office of Strategic Services and wrote five books on his native Finland. His mother, Alfhild Kalijarvi, received her M.A. in biology from Smith College. Wuorinen grew up at the Upper West Side of Manhattan. He excelled academically, graduating from Trinity School (New York City) as valedictorian in 1956; he later received a B.A. (1961) and an M.A. (1963) in music from Columbia University. His early supporters included Jacques Barzun and Edgard Varèse.

=== 1940s and 1950s ===
Wuorinen began composing at age 5 and began piano lessons at 6. At 16 he was awarded the New York Philharmonic's Young Composers' Award and the John Harms Chorus premiered his choral work O Filii et Filiae at Town Hall on May 2, 1954. He was active as a singer and pianist with the choruses at the Church of the Heavenly Rest and the Church of the Transfiguration (Little Church Around the Corner), and was the rehearsal pianist for the world premiere of Carlos Chávez's opera Panfilo and Lauretta at Columbia University during the spring of 1957. From 1952 to 1956 Wuorinen was president of the Trinity School Glee Club. He was pianist, librarian, and general manager of the Columbia University Orchestra in 1956–57. During the summers of 1955 and 1956, he was the organist at Saint Paul's Church in Gardner, Massachusetts, where his parents stayed during the summer months. He was awarded the Joseph H. Bearns Prize three times, the BMI Student Composers Award four times, and the Lili Boulanger Award twice (1961 and 1962). He was a fellow at the Chamber Music Conference and Composers' Forum of the East for several years. Many early professional performances of Wuorinen's compositions took place on the Music of Our Time series at the 92nd Street Y run by violinist Max Pollikoff.

=== 1960s ===
In 1962 Wuorinen and fellow composer-performer Harvey Sollberger formed The Group for Contemporary Music. The ensemble raised the standard of new music performance in New York, championing such composers as Milton Babbitt, Elliott Carter and Stefan Wolpe, who wrote several works for the ensemble. Many of Wuorinen's works were premiered by The Group, including Chamber Concerto for Cello and the Chamber Concerto for Flute. Major Wuorinen compositions of the '60s include Orchestral and Electronic Exchanges, premiered by the New York Philharmonic conducted by Lukas Foss; the First Piano Concerto, with composer as soloist; the String Trio, written for the then newly formed new music ensemble Speculum Musicae; and Time's Encomium, Wuorinen's only purely electronic piece, composed using the RCA Synthesizer at the Columbia-Princeton Electronic Music Center on a commission from Nonesuch Records, for which Wuorinen was awarded the 1970 Pulitzer Prize for Music at the age of 32. Wuorinen was appointed to instructor at Columbia in 1964 and promoted to assistant professor in 1969, the year he received an Ingram Merrill Foundation grant; during this period, he was visiting lecturer at the New England Conservatory (1968–71), Princeton University (1969–71), the University of Iowa (1970), and the University of South Florida (1971).

=== 1970s ===
The 1970s were a particularly fruitful period for Wuorinen, who taught at the Manhattan School of Music from 1971 to 1979. Chamber works during this decade include his first two string quartets, the Six Pieces for Violin and Piano, Fast Fantasy for cello and piano, and two large works for the Tashi Ensemble, Tashi and Fortune. Works for orchestra include Grand Bamboula for strings, A Reliquary for Igor Stravinsky, which incorporates the elder master's last sketches, the Second Piano Concerto, and the Concerto for Amplified Violin and Orchestra, which caused a scandal at its premiere at the Tanglewood Festival with Paul Zukofsky and the BSO conducted by Michael Tilson Thomas. In 1976 Wuorinen completed his Percussion Symphony, a five-movement work for 24 players including two pianos for the New Jersey Percussion Ensemble and his longtime colleague Raymond Des Roches, as well as his opera subtitled "a baroque burlesque", The W. of Babylon with an original libretto by Renaud Charles Bruce. The New Jersey Percussion Ensemble had also performed and recorded Wuorinen's composition "Ringing Changes" in collaboration with the Group for Contemporary Music prior to the Percussion Symphony, setting the stage for this challenging larger-scale work. The ensemble, created by Raymond Des Roches, recorded the Percussion Symphony, which was released in 1978 by Nonesuch. In the late 1970s Wuorinen became interested in the work of the mathematician Benoit Mandelbrot and with a grant from the Rockefeller Foundation he conducted sonic experiments at Bell Labs in New Jersey. In an interview with Richard Burbank, Wuorinen is quoted as saying:

What I did at Bell Labs (with Mark Liberman) was to try various experiments in which strings of pseudo-random material, usually pitches but sometimes other things, were generated and then subjected to traditional types of compositional organization, including twelve-tone procedures. What I wanted to do was to see whether or not these things sounded "composed," sounded purposively chosen. They did, at least by my lights. The random sequences were not just any old random sequences but were that of a kind called 1/f randomness.

=== 1980s ===
The 1980s were framed by two large-scale works for chorus and orchestra based on Biblical texts, the 60-minute oratorio The Celestial Sphere for the 100th Anniversary of the Handel Oratorio Society in Rock Island Illinois of 1980 and Genesis (1989), jointly commissioned by the Minnesota Orchestra and San Francisco Symphony. Other major orchestral works during this period include the Rhapsody for Violin and Orchestra; the Third Piano Concerto, written for pianist Garrick Ohlsson; Movers and Shakers, the first work commissioned by the Cleveland Orchestra for music director Christoph von Dohnányi; Bamboula Squared for computer-generated sound and orchestra (inspired by Wuorinen's work at Bell Labs); and The Golden Dance. Wuorinen was composer in residence with the San Francisco Symphony from 1984 to 1989. Major chamber works of the 1980s include his Third String Quartet commissioned to commemorate the 25th anniversary of the Hopkins Center for the Arts at Dartmouth College, The Blue Bamboula for pianist Ursula Oppens, the Sonata for Violin and Piano commissioned by the Library of Congress and premiered at the Library on an all-Wuorinen concert, String Sextet, New York Notes, Third Piano Sonata for Alan Feinberg, and trios for various combinations including three works for horn trio. In the 1980s Wuorinen began an association with the New York City Ballet which resulted in a series of works designed for dance: Five (Concerto for Amplified Cello and Orchestra) for choreographer Jean-Pierre Bonnefoux and Wuorinen's longtime colleague and champion Fred Sherry, Delight of the Muses based on works of Mozart and commissioned in honor of the Mozart's bicentennial, and three works inspired by scenes from Dante's La Divina Commedia for Peter Martins (The Mission of Virgil, The Great Procession and The River of Light). In addition to the Dante texts Wuorinen was influenced by the watercolors of William Blake. For the New York City Ballet Wuorinen also made a two-piano arrangement of Schoenberg's Variations for Orchestra (Schoenberg) choreographed by Richard Tanner, and Martins created a ballet based on Wuorinen's A Reliquary for Igor Stravinsky. In 1985 Wuorinen was awarded a MacArthur Foundation Fellowship.

=== 1990s ===
Wuorinen devoted increased attention to writing works for voice, including his setting of Dylan Thomas's A Winter's Tale for soprano Phyllis Bryn-Julson and the Fenton Songs I & II on poems by British poet James Fenton, with whom Wuorinen was collaborating on an opera. Major chamber works included the Saxophone Quartet for the Raschèr Saxophone Quartet, Percussion Quartet, Piano Quintet, and Sonata for Guitar and Piano. Orchestral works included the Concerto for Saxophone Quartet and Orchestra and Symphony Seven as well as the Dante works for the New York City Ballet.

=== 2000 onward ===
With the start of the 21st century, James Levine became a major champion of Wuorinen's music. Levine commissioned Wuorinen's Fourth Piano Concerto for his first season at the Boston Symphony Orchestra; the tone poem Theologoumenon (a 60th birthday gift for Levine from his longtime manager Ronald Wilford), premiered by the Metropolitan Opera Orchestra; and the Eighth Symphony: Theologoumena, for the BSO. In honor of Wuorinen's 70th birthday Levine conducted two performances of Wuorinen's Ashberyana at the Guggenheim Museum.

Other champions of Wuorinen's music include Peter Serkin, for whom Wuorinen composed three concertos including Time Regained (based on music of Machaut, Matteo da Perugia, Guillaume Dufay, and Orlando Gibbons) and Flying to Kahani, commissioned by Carnegie Hall; the solo Scherzo and Adagio; and the Second Piano Quintet with the Brentano Quartet, another ensemble with which Wuorinen has had a very fruitful relationship and for which he wrote his Fourth String Quartet. In 2004 the New York City Opera premiered his opera Haroun and the Sea of Stories based on the novel by Salman Rushdie, with a libretto by James Fenton. Two other song cycles based on Fenton's poetry were created around this time, Fenton Songs I and II. Other works from this decade include Cyclops 2000 for Oliver Knussen and the London Sinfonietta; Ashberyana, settings of poetry by John Ashbery; Spin5, a chamber concerto for violinist Jennifer Koh; the Fourth Piano Sonata, for Anne-Marie McDermott; Synaxis; Metagong; and It Happens Like This, a dramatic cantata on seven poems by James Tate premiered at Tanglewood with the composer conducting.

Between 2008 and 2012, Wuorinen composed the opera Brokeback Mountain, based on Annie Proulx's short story of the same name and with a libretto adapted by Proulx. It premiered on January 28, 2014, at the Real in Madrid to mixed reviews.

== Death ==
On September 7, 2019, Wuorinen suffered a fall that caused a subdural hematoma. Over the next several months he had three additional falls, ultimately leading to his death on March 11, 2020, at New York Columbia-Presbyterian hospital. A requiem mass was held at St. Ignatius of Antioch Episcopal Church on May 30, 2020. It was broadcast live and uploaded to YouTube.

== Music ==
Wuorinen wrote more than 270 pieces, including the operas Haroun and the Sea of Stories and Brokeback Mountain. He has been described as totally committed to twelve-tone composition, with Schoenberg, late Stravinsky, and Babbitt as primary influences. In later years, he called the term serialism "almost without meaning".

Much of Wuorinen's music is technically complex, requiring extreme virtuosity by the performer, including wide leaps, extreme dynamic contrasts, and rapid exchange of pitches. Fractals and the mathematical theories of Benoit Mandelbrot are also important aspects of his style, as can be seen in works such as Bamboula Squared and the Natural Fantasy for organ.

== Writings and lectures ==
Wuorinen wrote the book Simple Composition. He described it as

written by a composer and ... addressed to other composers — intending or actual, amateur or professional. Thus it is similar in intent to certain older books on the subject like Thomas Morley's A Plain and Easie Introduction to Practical Musicke (1597), for instance.... It outlines present practice, and while it can be used for purely didactic purposes, it can also be employed in composing "real" music.

Wuorinen lectured at universities in the United States and abroad, and served on the faculties of Columbia, Princeton, and Yale universities, the University of Iowa, the University of California-San Diego, the Manhattan School of Music, the New England Conservatory, the State University of New York at Buffalo, and Rutgers University. He wrote the introduction to Joan Peyser's To Boulez and Beyond.

== Influence and legacy ==
Wuorinen's works have influenced a number of other composers. Robert Black cited him as a particular influence on his style. Black also recorded Wuorinen's New York Notes. Jazz trumpeter Dave Douglas wrote, "Around 1992 I found Charles Wuorinen’s book Simple Composition in the Brooklyn Public Library. I thought, 'At last! My problems are over!' Little did I know, they were just beginning... The book had a profound effect on me and spurred a whole new approach to composing for improvising small groups."

In 2019, Perspectives of New Music published a Festschrift, Charles Wuorinen: A Celebration at 80, comprising analytical articles and compositions written for the occasion by Wuorinen's friends and colleagues. The issue (Volume 56, Number 2, Summer 2018) was followed by an 80th birthday celebration at the Eastman School of Music that featured a master class, a symposium, and concerts of his music as well as works dedicated to him.

== Criticism ==
Wuorinen was criticized as intolerant and hostile in his writings toward people with differing views on music. In 1963, he wrote in Perspectives on New Music, "I must unequivocally state that pitch serialization is no longer an issue", and that young composers should be "acting out the implications of the older generation's work". For Richard Taruskin, such statements imply a totalitarian view that only twelve-tone composers are to be regarded as composers. Taruskin has described similar statements as "fantasies of infantile omnipotence".

In 1971, the Columbia University music faculty denied Wuorinen tenure, which he attributed to "hostility to the present, and those who advocate it in music". Others have attributed the decision to Wuorinen's intolerant and arrogant attitude.

The opening paragraph of Simple Composition has been controversial. Taruskin describes it as another example of Wuorinen's contempt for music outside the 12-tone system.

While the tonal system, in an atrophied or vestigial form, is still used today in popular and commercial music, and even occasionally in the works of backward-looking serious composers, it is no longer employed by serious composers of the mainstream. It has been replaced or succeeded by the 12-tone system

— Charles Wuorinen, Simple Composition (1978), opening paragraph

In a 1988 interview, Wuorinen said, "I feel what I do is right [...] pluralism has gone too far", and criticized views on which "the response of the untutored becomes the sole criterion for judgment". Rather, he suggested, "I would try to change the present relationship of the composer to the public from one in which the composer says: 'please, judge me,' to one in which I say: 'I have something to show you and offer my leadership.'"

More recently, Wuorinen called the term serialism "almost without meaning", a statement that has also been criticized. In a 2005 interview, when asked if he was a serialist composer, he restated this opinion:

Question: People say that you [Wuorinen] are a serialist, you write atonal, difficult, thorny music. Are those perceptions correct or not, or is there some truth to them?
Wuorinen: An interesting question to ask someone about one or the other of us, "Oh, he's this or that way," is "Which particular piece are you referring to?" You won't get an answer, I guarantee you. These categories have very little meaning. To call me a serial composer, I think, is—first of all, the term has to be defined, and no one ever bothers to do it.

— Charles Wuorinen, Interview with Daniel Wakin (2005)

In 2018, Wuorinen denounced the Pulitzer Prize jury for awarding its music award to hiphop artist Kendrick Lamar, telling the New York Times the decision constituted "the final disappearance of any societal interest in high culture."

== Performance and conducting ==
Wuorinen was active as a performer, a pianist and a conductor of his own works as well as other 20th-century repertoire. His orchestral appearances have included the Cleveland Orchestra, Chicago Symphony, New York Philharmonic, San Francisco Symphony, Los Angeles Philharmonic, and the American Composers Orchestra. He conducted the American, and later the West Coast, premieres of Morton Feldman's monodrama Neither.

In 1962 he co-founded The Group for Contemporary Music, an ensemble dedicated to performance of new chamber music. In addition to cultivating a new generation of performers, commissioning and premiering hundreds of new works, the Group has also been a model for similar organizations that have appeared in the United States since its founding.

== Personal life ==
Wuorinen resided in New York City and the Long Valley section of Washington Township, Morris County, New Jersey. He was married to his longtime partner and manager, Howard Stokar.

Wuorinen died in New York on March 11, 2020, aged 81, as a result of injuries sustained in a fall the preceding September.

== Discography ==
This is a partial discography of Wuorinen:

- It Happens Like This / Fourth Piano Sonata / Alphabetical Ashbery. Anne-Marie MacDermott, piano, loadbang, The Group for Contemporary Music, composer conducting, Bridge Records 9490
- Eighth Symphony (Theologoumena) / Fourth Piano Concerto. Peter Serkin, piano, Boston Symphony Orchestra, James Levine, conducting. Bridge Records 9474
- Scherzo / First String Quartet / Viola Variations / Second Piano Quintet. Peter Serkin, piano, Brentano String Quartet, Curtis Macomber, violin, Jesse Mills, violin, Lois Martin, viola, Fred Sherry, cello. Naxos Records 8.559694.
- Ashberyana / Fenton Songs / Fenton Songs II / Praegustatum / Ave Christe: Josquin / Josquiniana. Leon Williams, baritone, Lucy Shelton soprano, James Pugh, trombone Brentano String Quartet, Sarah Rothenberg, piano. Naxos 8.559377
- String Sextet / String Quartet No. 2 / Piano Quintet / Divertimento for string quartet. Chamber Music Society of Lincoln Center, Tashi, Ursula Oppens, The Group for Contemporary Music. Naxos 8.559288
- Dante Trilogy: The Mission of Virgil / The Great Procession / The River of Light. (chamber version, live recording), The Group for Contemporary Music, Oliver Knussen, conductor. Naxos 8.559345
- Tashi / Percussion Quartet / Fortune. Tashi, The Group for Contemporary Music, New Jersey Percussion Ensemble. Naxos 8.559321
- Horn Trio / Horn Trio Continued / Trombone Trio / Trio for Bass Instruments / Double Solo for Horn Trio. The Group for Contemporary Music. Naxos 8.559264
- Cyclops 2000 / A Reliquary for Igor Stravinsky. London Sinfonietta, Oliver Knussen, conductor. London Sinfonietta label 859811 (Reliquary previously issued on DGG)
- On Alligators / Fourth String Quartet / Natural Fantasy / Third Piano Concerto. Kevin Bowyer, organ, Brentano String Quartet, Garrick Ohlsson, piano, San Francisco Symphony, Herbert Blomstedt, conductor. Tzadik Records 8010
- Time's Encomium / Lepton / New York Notes / Epithalamium. SurPlus Ensemble, Chamber Music Society of Lincoln Center, Wuorinen conducting, Paul Christopher Gekker and Mark Gould, trumpets. Tzadik Records 7077 /
- Duos: Sonata for Guitar and Piano / Never Again The Same / Duo Sonata for Flute and Piano / Divertimento for Alto Saxophone and Piano / Eleven Short Pieces / Psalm 39 / Percussion Duo. William Anderson (guitarist), Joan Forsyth, piano, Wilbur Pauley, bass, Christopher Hall, tuba, Thomas Meglioranza, baritone, Robert Aitken (composer), flute, James Avery (musician), piano, John Ferrari, percussion, Margaret Kampmeier, piano, Erik Carlson, violin, Michael Caterisano, percussion, Eliot Gattego, alto saxophone, Eric Wubbels, piano. Albany Records TROY1077
- Five Concerto for Amplified Cello and Orchestra / The Golden Dance / Concerto for Amplified Violin and Orchestra. Fred Sherry, cello, Orchestra of St. Luke's, Wuorinen conductor, San Francisco Symphony, Herbert Blomstedt conducting, Paul Zukofsky, violin, Radio-Sinfonie-Orchester Frankfurt, Eliahu Inbal, conductor. Albany Records TROY711
- The Haroun Songbook. Elizabeth Farnum, soprano, Emily Golden, mezzo-soprano, James Schaffner, tenor, Michael Chioldi, bass-baritone, Phillip Bush, piano, Albany Records TROY664
- Fast Fantasy / An Orbicle of Jasp / Andante espressivo / Cello Variations / Cello Variations II / Cello Variations III / Grand Union. Fred Sherry, cello, Charles Wuorinen, piano, Thomas Kolor, percussion. Albany Records TROY658
- Hyperion / Archaeopteryx / arrangement of Schoenberg's Variations for Orchestra, Op. 31 / Webern's arrangement of Schoenberg's Five Pieces for Orchestra op. 16. St. Luke' Chamber Ensemble, Charles Wuorinen, conductor, David Taylor, bass trombone Richard Moredock, Cameron Grant, James Winn pianos. Albany Records TROY992
- Vocal Works: Two Machine Portraits (Les Murray (poet)), The Long Boat (Stanley Kunitz), Twang (Wallace Stevens), Lightening viii (Seamus Heaney), September 11, 2001 (W.H. Auden), Fenton Songs, Christes Crosse, Pentecost (Derek Walcott), A Song to the Lute in Musicke, Stanzas Before Time (John Ashbery), A Winter's Tale (Dylan Thomas). Albany Records TROY968
- Hyperion / Archaeopteryx / arr. of Arnold Schoenberg's Variations for Orchestra, Op. 31 / Webern's arrangement of Schoenberg's Five Pieces for Orchestra, Op. 16. Albany Records, TROY992
- Genesis / A solis ortu / Mass (for the Restoration of St. Luke in the Fields) / Ave Christie: Josquin. Minnesota Orchestra & Chorale, Edo de Waart, conductor, Charles Wuorinen, piano.

== Notable students ==
Wuorinen's students include Arthur Russell, Robert Bonfiglio, Michael Daugherty, Aaron Jay Kernis, Peter Lieberson, Tobias Picker, Kenneth Lampl and James Romig.

== References and interviews ==
- Bloomberg TV segment at the Wuorinen website, 2008
- Brokeback Mountain, The Opera Charles Wuorinen interviewed by Peter Dobrin, ArtsWatch: PhillyNews.com, June 9, 2008
- Burbank, Richard D. Charles Wuorinen: A Bio-Bibliography. Greenwood Press, 1994. ISBN 0-313-25399-4
- Duffie, Bruce. "Interview with Charles Wuorinen", February 26, 1987
- Karchin, Louis. "Wuorinen, Charles". The New Grove Dictionary of Music and Musicians, second edition, edited by Stanley Sadie and John Tyrrell. London: Macmillan Publishers, 2001.
- Kennedy, Michael. The Oxford Dictionary of Music. Oxford and New York: Oxford University Press, 2006. ISBN 0-19-861459-4.
- Kerner, Leighton (January 2005). "In Review: New York City". Opera News. pp. 54–56.
- Charles Wuorinen (June 5, 2007). "Art and Entertainment". NewMusicBox (Interview). Interviewed by Frank J. Oteri (published July 1, 2007). (includes video)
- Peyser, Joan (1995). The Music of my Time, Vol.1. Pro/AM Music Resources Incorporated. pp. 199 ff. ISBN 0-912483-99-7.
- Romig, James. "Charles Wuorinen: Adapting To The Times". Liner notes for Albany Records (Troy 871).
- Smith, Steve. "A Serialist Island Thrives in a Sea of Minimalism". The New York Times (January 28, 2007).
- Tommasini, Anthony. "Renaissance and Medieval Hues in a Modernist Work". The New York Times (January 26, 2009). (review of Wuorinen's Time Regained)
- Wakin, Daniel. "Sometimes Keeping the Beat is Easy". The New York Times (April 7, 2007) (article on performance of Wuorinen's Percussion Symphony)
