= All the Wrong Places (book) =

- Cover of reprint by Granta 2005
- Author: James Fenton
- Language: English
- Publication date: 1988
- Publication place: United Kingdom
- Media type: Print

All the Wrong Places: Adrift in the Politics of the Pacific Rim is a 1988 collection of reports and reminiscences of his time as a journalist in Asia by the English poet James Fenton. It was reissued with a new introduction by Granta in 2005.

== Summary ==
The reports cover Vietnam during the late phase of the Vietnam War which ended in 1975, Cambodia during the early years of the Khmer Rouge, the Philippines of Imelda Marcos and South Korea before democracy.

The reports provide some context for poems written later such as Cambodia and Dead Soldiers from the collection The Memory of War and the poem Out of the East from the collection Out of Danger (1993).

The book was translated into Spanish as Lugares no recomendables: reportajes políticos sobre el Sudeste Asiático Barcelona: Editorial Anagrama, 1991.
