= James Fenton =

English poet, journalist and literary critic (born 1949)

James Fenton FRSL
- Born: 25 April 1949 (age 77); Lincoln, England
- Education: Magdalen College, Oxford
- Occupations: Poet, journalist, literary critic
- Partner: Darryl Pinckney
- Parent: John Fenton

James Martin Fenton FRSL (born 25 April 1949) is an English poet, journalist and literary critic. He is a former Oxford Professor of Poetry.

== Life and career ==
Born in Lincoln, Fenton grew up in Lincolnshire and Staffordshire, the son of Canon John Fenton, a biblical scholar. He was educated at the Durham Choristers School, Repton and Magdalen College, Oxford. He graduated with a B.A. degree in 1970.

While at school Fenton acquired an enthusiasm for the work of W. H. Auden. At Oxford, his tutor John Fuller, who was writing A Reader's Guide to W. H. Auden at the time, further encouraged that enthusiasm. Auden became perhaps the most significant single influence on Fenton's work.

In his first year at university, Fenton won the Newdigate Prize for his sonnet sequence Our Western Furniture. Later published by Fuller's Sycamore Press, it largely concerns the cultural collision in the 19th century between the United States and Japan. It displays in embryo many of the characteristics that define Fenton's later work: technical mastery combined with a fascination with issues that arise from the Western interaction with other cultures. Our Western Furniture was followed by Exempla, a poetry sequence later published in The Memory of War. The poem is notable for its frequent use of unfamiliar words, as well as commonplace words employed in an unfamiliar manner.

While studying at Oxford, Fenton became a close friend of Christopher Hitchens, whose memoir Hitch-22 is dedicated to Fenton and has a chapter on their friendship. Hitchens praised Fenton's extraordinary talent, stating that he too believed him to be the greatest poet of his generation. He also expounded on Fenton's modesty, describing him as infinitely more mature than himself and Martin Amis. Fenton and Hitchens shared a house together in their third year, and continued to be close friends until Hitchens's death. Fenton read his poem 'For Andrew Wood' at the Vanity Fair Hitchens memorial service.

His first collection, Terminal Moraine (1972) won a Gregory Award. With the proceeds he traveled to East Asia, where he wrote of the U.S. withdrawal from Vietnam and the end of the Lon Nol regime in Cambodia, which presaged the rise of Pol Pot. The poems featured in his collection The Memory of War (1982) ensured his reputation as one of the greatest war poets of his time.

Fenton returned to London in 1976. He was political correspondent of the New Statesman, where he worked alongside Christopher Hitchens, Julian Barnes and Martin Amis. He became the Assistant Literary Editor in 1971, and Editorial Assistant in 1972. Hitchens had formally recruited Fenton to the International Socialists and earlier in his journalistic career, like Hitchens, Fenton had written for Socialist Worker, the party's weekly paper. Fenton was an occasional war reporter in Vietnam during the late phase of the Vietnam War, which ended in 1975. His experiences in Vietnam and Cambodia from summer 1973 form a part of All the Wrong Places (1988). The publication of the book revealed some of Fenton's second thoughts about revolutionary socialism. Between 1978 and 1980, Fenton spent a year in West Berlin as a reporter for The Guardian, sharing a flat with Timothy Garton Ash.

In 1983, Fenton accompanied his friend Redmond O'Hanlon to Borneo. A description of the voyage can be found in the book Into the Heart of Borneo.

Fenton won the Geoffrey Faber Memorial Prize in 1984 for Children in Exile: Poems 1968–1984. He was appointed Oxford Professor of Poetry in 1994, a post he held till 1999. He was awarded the Queen's Gold Medal for Poetry in 2007. The American composer Charles Wuorinen set several of his poems to music, and Fenton served as librettist for Wuorinen's opera Haroun and the Sea of Stories (2001, premiered in 2004), based on Salman Rushdie's novel.

Fenton has said: "The writing of a poem is like a child throwing stones into a mineshaft. You compose first, then you listen for the reverberation." In response to criticisms of his comparatively slim Selected Poems (2006), he warned against the notion of poets churning out poetry in a regular, automated fashion.

Fenton has been a frequent contributor to The Guardian, The Independent and The New York Review of Books. He once wrote the head column in the editorials of each Friday's Evening Standard. In 2007, he appeared in a list of the "100 most influential gay and lesbian people in Britain" published by The Independent on Sunday.

Fenton's partner is Darryl Pinckney, the prize-winning novelist, playwright and essayist perhaps best known for the novel High Cotton (1992).

=== Musical theatre influence ===
Fenton has been influenced in his writing by musical theatre, as evidenced in "Here Come the Drum Majorettes" from Out of Danger:

"Gleb meet Glubb.
Glubb meet Glob.
God that's glum, that glib Glob dig.
'Dig that bog!'
'Frag that frog.'
'Stap that chap, he snuck that cig.'"

He was the original English librettist for the musical of Les Misérables but Cameron Mackintosh later replaced him with Herbert Kretzmer. Kretzmer credited Fenton with creating the general structure of the adaptation, and Fenton is credited for additional lyrics, for which he receives royalties, as stipulated in his contract.

== Awards and honours ==
- 1968: Newdigate Prize
- 1971: Eric Gregory Award
- 1981: Southern Arts Literature Award for Poetry
- 1983: Fellowship of the Royal Society of Literature (FRSL)
- 1984: Geoffrey Faber Memorial Prize
- 1994: Oxford Professor of Poetry
- 1994: Whitbread Prize for Poetry, for Out of Danger
- 1999: Honorary Fellowship of Magdalen College, Oxford
- 2003: Fellowship of The Royal Society of Arts
- 2007: Queen's Gold Medal for Poetry
- 2015: PEN Pinter Prize Share With Raif Badawi

== Books ==
- 1968: Our Western Furniture, poetry
- 1969: Put Thou Thy Tears into My Bottle, poetry
- 1972: Terminal Moraine
- 1978: A Vacant Possession, TNR Publications
- 1980: A German Requiem: A Poem, Salamander Press, a pamphlet
- 1981: Dead Soldiers, Sycamore Press
- 1982: The Memory of War: Poems 1968–1982, Salamander Press, 1982, ISBN 978-0-907540-39-7
- 1984: Children in Exile: Poems 1968–1984 Random House, 1984, ISBN 978-0-394-53360-5 These poems combined with those from The Memory of War made up the Penguin volume, The Memory of War and Children in Exile; published in the United States as Children in Exile; Salamander Press
- 1983: You Were Marvellous, selected theatre reviews published 1979–1981
- 1986: The Snap Revolution
- 1987: Partingtime Hall, co-author with John Fuller, Viking / Salamander Press, comical poems
- 1988: All the Wrong Places: Adrift in the Politics of the Pacific Rim, reportage; Viking; Atlantic Monthly Press (1988); reissued with a new introduction by Granta (2005)
- 1989: Manila Envelope, self-published book of poems
- 1994: Out of Danger, Fenton considers this his second collection of poems. It contains Manila Envelope and later poems; Penguin; Farrar Straus Giroux; winner of the Whitbread Prize for Poetry
- 1998: Leonardo's Nephew, art essays from The New York Review of Books
- 2001: The Strength of Poetry: Oxford Lectures, Oxford University Press, 2001, ISBN 978-0-19-818707-3
- 2001: A Garden from a Hundred Packets of Seed Viking / Farrar, Straus and Giroux
- 2002: (As editor) An introduction to English poetry, Farrar, Straus and Giroux, 2002, ISBN 978-0-374-10464-1
- 2003: The Love Bomb, verse written as a libretto for a composer who rejected it; Penguin / Faber and Faber
- 2006: School of Genius: A History of the Royal Academy of Arts (2006), a history
- 2006: Selected Poems, Penguin
- 2006: (As editor) The New Faber Book of Love Poems
- 2012: Yellow Tulips: Poems 1968–2011
- 2012: The Orphan of Zhao, adaptation of the classic Chinese play for the Royal Shakespeare Company

== See also ==
- Andrew Motion
- Al Alvarez
- Beat poet
- Cole Porter
- Ira Gershwin

== Sources ==
- Creswell, Robyn (Autumn 2012). "James Fenton, The Art of Poetry No. 96". The Paris Review. Fall 2012 (202).
- Gioia, Dana. "The Rise of James Fenton", The Dark Horse (No. 8, Autumn 1999)
- Hulse, Michael. "The Poetry of James Fenton", The Antigonish Review Vol. 58. pp. 93–102, 1984
- Kerr, Douglas. "Orientations: James Fenton and Indochina", Contemporary Literature, Vol. 35, No. 3 (Autumn, 1994) pp 476–91
