= Reactions to the Duke lacrosse case =

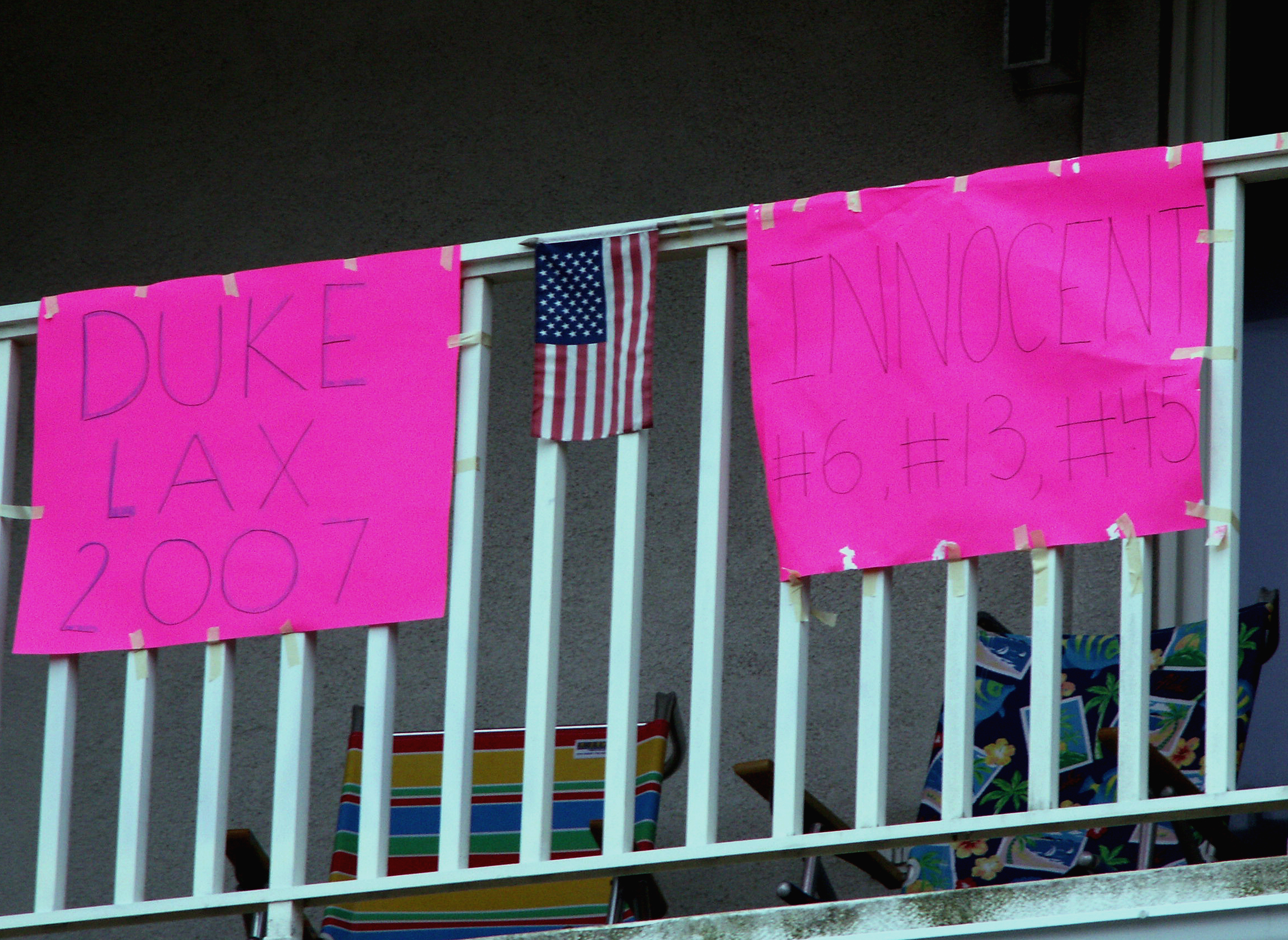
A balcony in New Jersey displaying signs pleading the players' innocence

The Duke lacrosse rape hoax in 2006 resulted in a great deal of coverage in the local and national media as well as a widespread community response at Duke and in the Durham, North Carolina area.

== Media coverage ==
=== Initial coverage (March–April 2006) ===
The case attracted widespread media attention almost from the moment it became public. The apparent circumstances had an aspect of racial and socioeconomic privilege - three white men (David Evans, Reade Seligmann, and Collin Finnerty) from privileged backgrounds at an elite university were accused of sexually abusing a student and single mother (Crystal Gail Mangum) from a black college (NCCU), who worked as a stripper and escort to make money— which made the case particularly appealing for news outlets. However, once the case deteriorated, critics saw it as a showcase of bias in the media and the university system.

Among those giving extensive coverage to the matter was Nancy Grace. Before Duke suspended its men's lacrosse team's season, she sarcastically said on the air, "I'm so glad they didn't miss a lacrosse game over a little thing like gang rape!" and "Why would you go to a cop in an alleged gang rape case, say, and lie and give misleading information?" Another, Susan Estrich, said "I teach criminal law. But what are we dealing with here? The mafia, or a sports team from a first-class university. Instead, they hire them lawyers to trash the victim and the prosecutor." Former prosecutor Wendy Murphy made some of the most inflammatory claims about the case, and supported the withholding of evidence by Durham County District Attorney Mike Nifong, saying, "Nifong should be rewarded for respecting the defendants' rights by not leaking the type of evidence that could help him personally respond to criticism." Murphy said "I never, ever met a false rape claim, by the way. My own statistics speak to the truth."

Feminist blogger Amanda Marcotte declared on her blog that people who defended the wrongly accused Duke students were "rape-loving scum". Time reported that in "late January, more ethics charges were heaped on the District Attorney in the Duke University sexual-assault case, and Marcotte attacked the news with her usual swagger and sarcasm:"

In the meantime, I've been sort of casually listening to CNN blaring throughout the waiting area and good fucking god is that channel pure evil. For awhile [sic?], I had to listen to how the poor dear lacrosse players at Duke are being persecuted just because they held someone down and fucked her against her will—not rape, of course, because the charges have been thrown out. Can’t a few white boys sexually assault a black woman anymore without people getting all wound up about it? So unfair.

Marcotte later deleted posts on her blog critical of her statements, then later deleted the entire entry.

Reason contributing editor Cathy Young has described Marcotte as a "leader of the cyber-lynch mob in the Duke University rape hoax". In "Marcotte's eyes, the real crime of the 'independent feminists' is helping preserve the idea that the presumption of innocence applies even in cases of rape and sexual assault."

Other outlets that have been accused of taking an initial pro-prosecution slants included, but are not limited to:

- USA Today
- The Herald-Sun
- Rolling Stone
- New York Times
- News and Observer
- Independent Weekly wrote articles affirming the stereotypes of affluence with respect to the three accused. The only position cited was the description of the players' characters by faculty member Peter Wood.

=== Continuation of the case (May–October 2006) ===
Nancy Grace continued to feature developments in the case on her program, with a pro-prosecution slant. On June 9, 2006, after hearing reporting on various defense motions, which the CNN reporter indicated might already prove reasonable doubt, Grace sarcastically asked, "Well I'm glad you have already decided the outcome of the case, based on all of the defense filings. Why don't we just all move to Nazi Germany, where we don't have a justice system and a jury of one's peers?" On June 22, 2006, she featured Sports Illustrated writer Lester Munson who opined, "I think the state has probably a better case than most observers are describing. I have studied this at some length ... There is some voracity [sic] to the victim's account."

On August 6, 2006, The News & Observer of Raleigh, North Carolina, wrote that District Attorney Mike Nifong "promised DNA evidence that has not materialized. He suggested that police conduct lineups in a way that conflicted with department policy." The article went on to say that "he made a series of factual assertions that contradicted his own files: He suggested the players used condoms; he accused the players of erecting a wall of silence to thwart investigators; and he said the woman had been hit, kicked and strangled. The medical and police records show that the victim had said no condom was used, that police had interviewed three players at length and taken their DNA samples and that the accuser showed no significant bruises or injuries."

On August 25, 2006, amid growing doubts as to the strength of the case and the veracity of Mangum, The New York Times published a front page article by Duff Wilson and Jonathan Glater stating that the weaknesses in the case highlighted by the defense were not indicative of the strength of the case as a whole. "In several important areas, the full files, reviewed by The New York Times, contain evidence stronger than that highlighted by the defense." The Times story further indicated that "there is also a body of evidence to support [Nifong's] decision to take the matter to a jury." This article would be widely criticized as the actual lack of strength of Nifong's case became apparent. In spite of widespread criticism, the newspaper's public editor defended Wilson, and he was permitted to remain on the case through Nifong's disbarment trial.

=== The case deteriorates (November 2006-May 2007) ===
Nancy Grace, who had been particularly vocal in her support for Nifong's prosecution, took the night off for the show following the attorney general's dismissal of all charges, with Jane Velez-Mitchell guest hosting instead.

Undaunted by the lack of DNA evidence, CNN's Paula Zahn said that "the DA would not be proceeding with this case if he didn't believe that this alleged victim had been raped." She also demanded explanations, saying, "How, then, sir [defense attorney Joe Cheshire], do you explain the woman's injuries ... particularly some of the internal injuries?"

The Boston Globe stayed in a lead editorial: "Three members of the Duke lacrosse team may have been louts, but all the evidence suggests they were not rapists . . . the students have the resources to get on with their lives."

While the march of the 2007 Duke men's team to the NCAA final game generally received extensive and favorable coverage, a number of sportswriters published negative stories about the team. Washington Post columnist Mike Wise wrote "[I]t's hard to embrace everyone as a victim. With all due respect to those 'INNOCENT' bracelets worn around Durham this year, this isn't "To Kill a Mockingbird II." Chicago Tribune columnist Philip Hersh commented, "The idea that the Duke lacrosse team's success is a feel-good story makes me ill. . . it would be a bigger mistake to believe (the dropping of charges) means Duke's lacrosse team was innocent of assault against common decency."

Sportswriter John Feinstein stated on the syndicated sports talk show The Jim Rome Show in May 2007, "I think they're guilty of everything but rape," and, "I really don’t want to hear that they’re victims and martyrs, and that their lives have been ruined." Feinstein, who in March 2006 had demanded the revocation of the scholarships of every Duke men's lacrosse team member, and who (against the findings of the Coleman report) continued to describe the team as "out-of-control", added "I don't think I've been proven wrong."

After proclamations by the North Carolina Attorney General, Roy Cooper, that the three students were "innocent" in April, USA Today columnist and incoming Bennett College President, Dr. Julianne Malveaux, commented in an interview on National Public Radio a few days later that they were "hooligans," that they had lied, and that they "did not deserve an apology."

The Duke Chronicle noted the closing of the case, and stated, "There are other members of the Duke community, however, from whom we have not heard [...] These are the voices of the range of individuals, from students to professors to community members, who responded to last year's allegations not with moderation [...] but with extreme, inflammatory and unfounded statements."

== Response ==
=== Duke faculty groups ===
Soon after the allegations were made, 88 Duke professors (sometimes referred to as the "Group of 88", or as the "Gang of 88") from the Trinity College of Arts & Sciences placed an ad in The Chronicle. The advertisement, spearheaded by faculty member Wahneema Lubiano, referred to the circumstances surrounding the allegations as a "social disaster", and quoted primarily anonymous individuals citing racism and sexism in the Duke community. The advertisement concluded, "We're turning up the volume [...] To the students speaking individually and to the protestors making collective noise, thank you for not waiting and for making yourselves heard," and "These are the students shouting and whispering about what happened to this young woman." Notable signatories included Houston Baker, Miriam Cooke, Anne Allison, Cathy Davidson, Ariel Dorfman, Michael Hardt, Alice Kaplan, Claudia Koonz, Pedro Lasch, Walter Mignolo, Mark Anthony Neal and Alex Rosenberg.

In three departments, more than half of faculty signed the statement. The department with the highest proportion of signatories was African and African-American Studies, with 80%. Just over 72% of the Women's Studies faculty signed the statement, Cultural Anthropology 60%, Romance studies 44.8%, Literature 41.7%, English 32.2%, Art & Art History 30.7%, and History 25%. No faculty members from the Pratt School of Engineering or full-time law professors signed the document. Departments that had no faculty members sign the document include Biological Anthropology and Anatomy, Biology, Chemistry, Computer Science, Economics, Genetics, Germanic Languages/Literature, Psychology and Neuroscience, Religion, and Slavic and Eurasian Studies.

In January 2007, many months after the initial print of the ad, a new letter was posted at the Concerned Duke Faculty website, signed by 87 faculty members, which stated that the original ad was misinterpreted. The letter states that the intent of the original ad was to address issues of racism and sexism in the community and not to prejudge the case.

In January 2007, lacrosse team member Kyle Dowd filed a lawsuit against Duke University and visiting associate professor and signatory to the original ad, Kim Curtis, claiming that he and another teammate were given failing grades on their final paper as a form of retaliation after the scandal broke. The case has been settled with the terms undisclosed except that Dowd's grade was altered to a P.

Dowd's mother emailed another original signatory, Houston Baker, who continued after the charges had been dropped to accuse her son and the others of being "hooligans, rapists" and called her "the mother of a farm animal."

Another signatory, Thavolia Glymph, said she was disappointed because, "since the DNA results were returned Monday, we [have been] moving backwards." The DNA results indicated that there was neither any sexual nor physical connection between the stripper and the players she accused.

Seventeen faculty members of the economics department sent a letter showing support for the players on January 6, 2007, saying, "We regret that the Duke faculty is now seen as prejudiced against certain of its own students," and telling the players that they are more than welcome to enroll in their courses.

=== Student groups and independent organizations ===
Many students showed their support for the lacrosse team during the investigation in a variety of ways. The Duke women's lacrosse team chose to wear "Innocent" sweatbands with the accused players' numbers during their games in the 2006 NCAA Final Four. "We want to win a national championship for ourselves but definitely also for the university and the men's team," one team member said. "They don't really have a chance to play their season, which is a shame." The women were criticized by many in the media. Kevin Sweeney of Salon argued that their actions will make it more difficult for rape victims to speak out in the future, while New York Times sports columnist Harvey Araton stated that their "cross-team friendship" made them lose common sense.

Another group of students, Duke Students for an Ethical Durham, sought to encourage students to vote in the upcoming election as Durham residents. It was specifically created in response to Nifong's mishandling of the case. Nifong ended up winning the election.

The Association for Truth and Fairness (ATAF) seeks to raise money to defray some of the indicted players' legal fees. ATAF, a non-profit organization, will continue to "help victims of abuses of power and other prosecutorial injustices."

Wristbands saying "Duke Lacrosse 2006 INNOCENT! #6 #13 #45" were also sold to raise money for the cause.

An outpouring of support came at the beginning of the 2007 lacrosse season. For the season opener, 6,485 fans attended the game to cheer the Blue Devils on their way to a 17–11 victory over Dartmouth.

=== North Carolina Central University forum ===
The day after DNA results came back negative, Nifong and other city officials such as Durham Mayor Bill Bell spoke at a community forum on April 12, 2006, on violence against women at N.C. Central, where the accuser was a student. The crowd, predominantly African American, criticized the media for portraying the accuser as a stripper and escort instead of a mother and student. One questioner said that Duke University hospital must have tampered with the DNA sample for it to come back negative, while another suggested that the accuser ought to have been helicoptered to Wake Forest University Baptist Medical Center for treatment since Duke had a conflict of interest. One NCCU student, Chan Hall, as quoted by Newsweek, stated, "It's the same old story. Duke up, Central down." He continued that he wanted to see the Duke students prosecuted "whether it happened or not. It would be justice for things that happened in the past." NCCU Chancellor James H. Ammons Jr. said that "[t]his incident has forced us to examine issues relevant to any campus environment -- sexism, racism and the need to educate our students about sexual assault and violence against women." At the same time, he urged the crowd to be patient and let the legal process take its course.

=== NAACP and civil rights activists ===
The NAACP urged for a thorough investigation of the facts and a trial with a jury before the public formed an opinion on the case. North Carolina NAACP Legal Redress Chair, Al McSurely, explained that "The NAACP stands for fair play for all parties, zealous investigation and deep concern for the survivors of racist/sexist attacks." At the same time, some have criticized the NAACP for making statements that portrayed the players as racist despite evidence to the contrary, using the case to promote the group's cause, and implying guilt. McSurely stated that "[w]ithin five minutes, the men threatened the women with racial and misogynist verbal assaults," despite evidence to the contrary. He continued that the lacrosse players "were caught with their macho entitlement views hanging out and, to save themselves, they have banned [sic] together to blame the survivor of their verbal assaults."

After Nifong dropped the rape charges against the three players in December 2006, the NAACP's "case monitor" and NCCU law professor Irving Joyner stated that the drop of rape charges could help Nifong's case: "Now, they don’t have to establish that there was penetration committed against the accuser . . . In addition to that, now they don’t have to deal with the DNA or the lack of DNA evidence. And with the rape shield statute, it’s unlikely that information will even come before the jury to consider."

On the official state NAACP's website, an 82 point 'Crimes and Torts committed by Duke Lacrosse Team Players' memo was listed long after the charges were dropped and the players were declared innocent. Included in the memorandum was an assessment of the defendants' strategy to have the charges dropped: "The three defendants they have two mountains to climb. First, they must deflect public attention from their boorish, racist, and illegal behavior by mounting outlandish attacks on the survivor and the D.A. Second, they must deal with a mountain of physical evidence, that is corroborated by, we have reason to believe, accounts of some of the men who were at the party who have cooperated with the police and the D.A. from early on." North Carolina Attorney General Roy A. Cooper refuted these facts in the summary of findings report. It stated that "no evidence ... corroborate[d] the accusing witness's versions of the events ... No DNA evidence confirmed her stories ... No medical evidence confirmed her stories ... No other witness confirmed her stories ... The accusing witness’s accounts of the story changed significantly."

In April 2006, civil rights activist Al Sharpton was invited on Fox's The O'Reilly Factor to discuss the case. Sharpton began the interview by commending the "blacks and whites who stood vigil and to come together in that community to stand up for this girl." In response to Bill O'Reilly's questions concerning the possibility that the woman might have fabricated the allegations, Sharpton said, "First of all, the authorities have charged there was a crime. ... When the prosecutors went forward, they clearly have said this girl is the victim, so why would we be trying the victim?" When O'Reilly mentioned recent news reports that DNA testing had failed to match any of the defendants, Sharpton said, "I think that all of the facts that you have laid out the DA had — and I know this DA is probably not one that is crazy. He would not have proceeded if he did not feel that he could convict." Sharpton continued that the case parallels "Abner Louima, who was raped and sodomized in a bathroom." At the conclusion of the interview, when O'Reilly said that Sharpton didn't know what happened, Sharpton agreed. "I don't know yet and I think that the proper thing to do is to support those that want justice."

On April 15, 2006, civil rights activist Jesse Jackson said that his non-profit Rainbow/Push Coalition organization would pay for the college tuition of the accuser, Mangum, whether she fabricated the story or not. Jackson said that she should never "have to stoop that low to survive." He continued that the "...fantasy's as old as slave masters impregnating young slave girls [...] The character of this thing is chilling [and] [s]omething happened that everybody's ashamed of..." Defense attorney Joe Cheshire found Jackson's comment about "slave masters" odd because the players did not ask for black strippers. "There is no slave-master mentality here, and that's just another perfect example of [...] self-absorbed race pandering," Cheshire stated.

After all charges were dropped on April 13, 2007, the North Carolina NAACP praised the state attorney general's investigation into Mangum's claims that had found them to be without merit.

=== Bloggers ===
The case received extensive coverage on blogs. One blog which supported the three students was Durham-in-Wonderland authored by Brooklyn College history professor KC Johnson. Johnson also co-authored a book on the case with journalist Stuart Taylor, entitled Until Proven Innocent: Political Correctness and the Shameful Injustices of the Duke Lacrosse Rape Case. The players' lawyers stated that they used the blog as a resource throughout the case, and Seligmann made a point of thanking Johnson in his statement following the dismissal of charges.

=== "Wanted poster" distribution ===
A poster that "looked like a wanted poster" was distributed on campus and in nearby neighborhoods shortly after the allegations surfaced in March 2006 showing pictures and names of 40 members of the lacrosse team, urging them to "come forward" with information on the alleged rape.

=== Duke administration and University president ===
During the initial investigation of the players by Durham police, Dean Sue Wasiolek advised the players to cooperate with police and tell the truth, not tell anybody about the charges, nor hire attorneys because she thought nothing would come of it. Wasiolek is one of the defendants named in the Ekstrand lawsuit. Chris Kennedy, senior associate athletic director, told the captains to contact their parents immediately and to hire attorneys shortly after (on March 17).

Moneta and Brodhead placed Reade Seligmann and Collin Finnerty on interim suspension for the Spring 2006 semester following their indictment, while David Evans graduated the day before he was indicted. In the fall of 2006, their status was modified to "administrative leave" to allow them to make academic progress while not at the university.

Richard H. Brodhead, president of Duke University, was quoted by WRAL-TV as saying to the Durham Chamber of Commerce on April 20, 2006, "If our students did what is alleged, it is appalling to the worst degree. If they didn’t do it, whatever they did is bad enough." At the same time, Brodhead repeatedly stated that "our students must be presumed innocent until proven otherwise," with his earliest citation on March 25, 2006.

On December 20, 2006, Brodhead stated that "the DA's case will be on trial just as much as our students will be." Two days later, Nifong dropped the most serious rape charges against the players. Brodhead released a statement calling for Nifong to recuse himself and questioned his actions: "Given the certainty with which the district attorney made his many public statements regarding the rape allegation, his decision today to drop that charge must call into question the validity of the remaining charges. The district attorney should now put this case in the hands of an independent party who can restore confidence in the fairness of the process. Further, Mr. Nifong has an obligation to explain to all of us his conduct in this matter."

On January 3, 2007, Brodhead invited Seligmann and Finnerty back to Duke as students in good standing even though they still faced charges. They were also welcomed to participate on the lacrosse team. Brodhead explained, "We have decided that the right and fair thing to do is to welcome back Reade Seligmann and Collin Finnerty to resume their studies at Duke for the spring semester. Although the students still face serious charges and larger issues require Duke’s collective attention, the circumstances in this case have changed substantially, and it is appropriate that the students have an opportunity to continue their education." Both declined. Instead, Seligmann decided to enroll at Brown University, while Finnerty chose to attend Loyola College in Maryland.

Brodhead, in an interview with Lesley Stahl of 60 Minutes, stated that "Duke has a rule and many, many, many other universities observe the same rule, which is that when a student is indicted for a crime that has an element of violence, we often separate the student from the university because you don't know at that time what harm [...] might be done either in the community or to the student. It isn’t a judgment of guilt. It isn't a disciplinary measure. And what we've done is to use the interim to try to understand the nature of the case better. Weighing a lot of things [...] the presumption of innocence, the nature of the charges, the need of the students to get on with their life. Once the facts took the turn they did in December, then we had to rebalance those things. Then at that point it just seemed to us that simple fairness meant that we had to allow the students to come back."

In regards to the team's season, Duke athletic director Joe Alleva decided to forfeit two games due to admitted behaviors such as "underage drinking and hiring private party dancers". According to Brodhead, the team's players then "wished to suspend competitive play until the DNA results come back." Brodhead then decided to suspend the remainder of the season until "there [was] a clearer resolution of the legal situation."

In an open letter to the public, Brodhead outlined his formation of committees to examine the lacrosse team, the administration's response to the incident, the student judicial process, campus culture, and a presidential council. The committees have been criticized by some observers, including KC Johnson, former student president Elliott Wolf (offered a seat in the Campus Culture Initiative), and The Chronicle, since it was chaired by several Group of 88 members such as Anne Allison, Karla FC Halloway, and lacrosse critics Prasad Kasibhatla and Peter Wood. Among the conclusions of the group-chaired committees was shared governance of athletics by faculty members, and required classes for students by group members. Also, the student senate representative was Chauncey Nartey, a student who Sue Pressler had previously reported to the police because he had made death threats to Mike Pressler's family.

After Nifong's resignation and disbarment, Brodhead released a statement: "One fact stares us in the face: The ordeal of the last 15 months was wholly unnecessary. It was not the result of reasonable differences of legal opinion or honest errors of judgment. Our students were accused by the community's senior law enforcement officer with no credible basis in fact [...] The actions Duke took caused consternation to many in the University family, which I profoundly regret. As Duke University's president, I resolve to do my part to repair the harm unleashed by Mr. Nifong's actions and to move forward from this painful episode."

Later, Brodhead apologized to the lacrosse players and their families for the university's "failure to reach out" in a "time of extraordinary peril." Brodhead's actions generated criticism from opinion pieces in the media. For example, Newsweek published an article on September 10, 2007, that argued that "Brodhead and Nifong [the DA in the case] had an almost willful disregard for the facts." An article in The Economist on September 15, 2007, stated that Brodhead did "little, if anything, to defend the lacrosse players or to criticise the faculty [at Duke] for its lynching mob mentality." Stuart Taylor Jr. and KC Johnson argue President Brodhead and other administrators "portray[ed] them [the students] with grotesque exaggeration as a bunch of uncooperative, rowdy, drunken white racists who might well be rapists, too. Nifong, hoping to divert attention from the powerful proof of innocence in the soon-to-be-public DNA tests (that exculpated the students), could hardly have hoped for a more obliging helper than Richard Brodhead."

=== Other Duke faculty ===
Duke English Professor Houston Baker (now former professor as he was hired as a Distinguished University Professor at Vanderbilt University in May 2006) wrote a scathing letter on March 29, 2006, regarding the lacrosse team and the administration's response to the incident, asking, "[w]hat have Duke and its leadership done to address this horrific, racist incident alleged to have occurred" and asserting "we have been deeply embarrassed by the silence that seems to surround this white, male athletic team's racist assaults (by words, certainly - deeds, possibly) in our community."

Baker also wrote that the players were "safe under the cover of silent whiteness" and these "[y]oung, white, violent, drunken men among us - [are] implicitly boasted [sic] by our athletic directors and administrators." He said Duke has joined other colleges and universities in the "blind-eying of male athletes, veritably given license to rape, maraud, deploy hate speech, and feel proud of themselves in the bargain." He also explicitly stated that the lacrosse players displayed "abhorrent sexual assault, verbal racial violence, and drunken white male privilege loosed amongst us."

Duke University Provost Peter Lange responded, "I cannot tell you how disappointed, saddened and appalled I was to receive this letter from you. A form of prejudice - one felt so often by minorities whether they be African American, Jewish or other - is the act of prejudgment: to presume that one knows something 'must' have been done by or done to someone because of his or her race, religion or other characteristic." He continued, "We do not know much about the worst of what may have happened in the incident that has inflamed our community," and concluded, "Sadly, letters like yours do little to advance our common cause."

Brodhead appointed Duke Law Professor, James Earl Coleman, Jr., to head the committee to examine the lacrosse team's culture. Dr. Coleman found that the team has exhibited "exemplary academic and athletic performance" and is "[n]either racist or sexist. On the contrary, the coach of the Duke Women's Lacrosse team has expressed her sense of camaraderie that exists between the men's and women's team; members of the men's team, for example, consistently come to the women's games. The current as well as former black members of the team have been extremely positive about the support the team provided them." Also in the report, while it was stated that the rates of alcohol abuse for the lacrosse team were higher than most other Duke athletic teams, "their conduct has not been different in character than the conduct of the typical Duke student who abuses alcohol."

Since then, Coleman has been one of the most vocal critics of Nifong's handling of the case. In an interview with 60 Minutes, Coleman argued that he pandered to the black community in the middle of the election campaign: "I think that he pandered to the community by saying 'I'm gonna go out there and defend your interests in seeing that these hooligans who committed the crime are prosecuted. I'm not gonna let their fathers, with all of their money, buy, you know, big-time lawyers and get them off. I'm doing this for you.'" Furthermore, Coleman stated that Nifong has committed serious prosecutorial misconduct, and if there was a conviction, there "would be a basis to have the conviction overturned based on his conduct."

Professor Steven Baldwin of the chemistry department was another of the few faculty members to make public statements about the case. In two letters to the Duke Chronicle ("What About Mike Pressler?" in April 2006 and "The Administration's Mismanagement of Lacrosse" in October 2006), Dr. Baldwin strongly criticized the administration's handling of the case, especially with respect to Coach Mike Pressler.

== End result ==
Even after decades passed, there are still media reports of the case. In December 2024, Crystal Mangum admitted, during a December 11, 2024 podcast interview, that she "made up a story that wasn't true" about the white lacrosse players who attended a party where she was hired to be a stripper.

== Legacy ==
After settlements and revelations of the false accusations, Duke continued to face scandals for how it handled false accusations at the University.

In early 2016, McKenna was falsely accused of sexual assault by a fellow student at Duke University. Initially, the university issued a six-semester suspension, but upon appeal by McKenna, it was concluded that the original panel had not applied the correct standard pursuant to Duke policy. A lawsuit was filed on Mckenna's behalf alleging due process violations, and in February 2017, Durham Judge Orlando Hudson issued a permanent injunction preventing Duke from suspending McKenna. In July 2018, McKenna and Duke settled the case outside of court, and in December 2018 McKenna graduated. Although the terms of the settlement are unknown, it is reported that McKenna made a six-figure donation to the Duke Law Wrongful Convictions Clinic shortly afterwards, as a gesture of gratitude to the co-director of the clinic and Duke Law Professor James E. Coleman, who had vigorously fought on McKenna's behalf.
