= KC Johnson =

American history professor

Professor KC Johnson
- Born: Robert David Johnson; November 27, 1967 (age 58)
- Education: Harvard University (BA, PhD); University of Chicago (MA)
- Occupation: History professor
- Employer(s): Brooklyn College and CUNY Graduate Center
- Known for: Writings on the Duke Lacrosse Rape Case; Brooklyn College history department tenure case
- Website: kc-johnson.com

Robert David Johnson (born November 27, 1967), also known as KC Johnson, is an American history professor at Brooklyn College and the Graduate Center of the City University of New York. He played a major role in reporting on the Duke lacrosse rape hoax in 2006–2007 in which three members of the Duke University men's lacrosse team were falsely accused of rape. In 2007 he co-authored a book, Until Proven Innocent: Political Correctness and the Shameful Injustice of the Duke Lacrosse Rape Case.

== Background ==
Johnson was raised in Leominster, Massachusetts, the son of Massachusetts schoolteachers. His father, Robert Johnson, was a star basketball player at Fitchburg State College, leading the nation in scoring at 39.1 points per game in 1964. Johnson's sister Kathleen was the starting point guard for the Columbia University women's basketball team in the early 1990s. Johnson goes by the name KC after Boston Celtics player K. C. Jones. He is also an athlete and has run numerous marathons.

He currently resides in Portland, Maine and teaches at Brooklyn College. In 2007-08, he taught at Tel Aviv University in Israel on a Fulbright Scholarship.

== Education ==
Johnson attended Groton School, Massachusetts. He received his B.A. (1988) and Ph.D. (1993) from Harvard University, and his M.A. from the University of Chicago (1989). Johnson taught at Arizona State University and Williams College and served as visiting professor at Harvard (2005) and at Tel Aviv University (2007–08), as Fulbright Distinguished Chair in the Humanities. Before earning his master's degree, Johnson worked as a track announcer for several years at Scarborough Downs.

Johnson has written and edited numerous books about American history. He also co-edited several volumes of declassified transcripts and tapes from the administration of Lyndon Baines Johnson.

== Denial of tenure ==
In 2002 and 2003, Johnson's denial of tenure by the Brooklyn College history department became the subject of media attention.

Wall Street Journal columnist Dorothy Rabinowitz wrote that the root of the conflict lay partly in Johnson's "resistance to gender-driven hiring," which "didn't endear him to the department's small but vociferous faction of political ideologues—a group that the chairman, Phillip Gallagher, had himself once described, in an e-mail to Mr. Johnson, as 'academic terrorists'." Johnson had also protested a "teach-in" about 9/11, "which was freighted with panelists hostile to any U.S. military response and which offered, Mr. Johnson noted, no supporters of U.S. or Israeli policies."

Colleagues began to criticize him, some of them arguing that his intense involvement in his work was, in Rabinowitz's words, "a sign of dubious mental health", and at least one of them complaining that "Johnson was asking too much of his students."

An article in The Harvard Crimson described clashes between Johnson and Gallagher that apparently also precipitated the denial of tenure. When Johnson sat on a search committee charged with finding an expert in 20th-century central or eastern European studies, he decided that one of the two women on the short list was unqualified. Another professor indicated, however, according to the Crimson, that "the department had an 'unofficial agenda' to hire a woman for the position." Later, Gallagher criticized Johnson for admitting students to his classes who had not taken the official prerequisites, even though Gallagher, according to Johnson, had not previously enforced such rules.

When Johnson went up for tenure, he was rejected on grounds of "lack of collegiality." In response, a group of 20 historians, spearheaded by the chairman of Harvard's history department, Akira Iriye (who had been Johnson's mentor and dissertation adviser), wrote a letter declaring that the tenure denial "reflects a 'culture of mediocrity' hostile to high academic standards... Introducing a redundant category of collegiality rewards young professors who 'go along to get along' rather than expressing independent scholarly judgement." Such thinking, the professors wrote, "poses a grave threat to academic freedom, since the robust and unfettered exchange of ideas is central to the pursuit of truth."

"This is the first time in my experience that scholars have gotten together to protest a decision like this," Iriye told the Harvard Crimson. "I am terribly upset and mystified by it. KC is a very visible scholar and a spectacular teacher." The Brooklyn College student government voted unanimously in support of Johnson, describing the refusal to grant tenure as a "violation of their academic rights".

The student government also noted that "the college's conduct of the KC Johnson tenure case was described by retired Brooklyn professor and longtime PSC grievance counselor Jerome Sternstein as 'the most corrupted tenure review process I have ever come across'; University of Pennsylvania professor Erin O’Connor described it as 'an exemplary instance of the sort of petty, internecine corruption that runs rife in academe, where accountability is minimal and the power to destroy careers is correspondingly high'; and Swarthmore College professor Timothy Burke described it as 'one more arrow in the quiver of academia's critics, one more revelation of the corruption of the profession as a whole, one more reason to question whether tenure ever serves the purpose for which it is allegedly designed'."

The Chronicle of Higher Education ran an article about Johnson's tenure battle entitled "Tenure Madness", where it is claimed that "more than 500 Brooklyn College students signed a petition supporting Mr. Johnson. They held rallies and marches." At the History News Network website, Ronald Radosh wrote: "Mr. Johnson represents the best of what CUNY has to offer its students; educated at top universities, he left a college many aspire to teach at to come to CUNY. He found that while his students appreciated and applauded his work and his commitment, the left-wing professoriate now dominant in the academy could not tolerate his insistence on quality standards in hiring, his dismissal of politically correct criteria, and his non-ideological approach to his field."

The New Republic editorialized that Brooklyn College's tenure criteria, as demonstrated by the Johnson case, "represented a grave threat to Brooklyn College's hope of ever being taken seriously as a scholarly institution." And Herbert London of the conservative Hudson Institute saw Johnson's tenure case as exemplifying the emergence in American universities of "an orthodoxy of decidedly left-wing opinion that intolerantly rejects any other point of view....it is ironic that tenure conceived as a way to insure independent thought free from censure is now employed to enforce conformity. What else can the 'lack of collegiality' possibly mean?"

Johnson appealed the tenure decision to the chancellor of the City University of New York system, Matthew Goldstein. Goldstein, in turn, appointed a select faculty committee consisting of distinguished scholars from other CUNY divisions to examine the case, namely Pamela Sheingorn and David Reynolds of Baruch College and Louis Masur of the City College. In accordance with their unanimous recommendation, Goldstein promoted Johnson to a full professorship with tenure. The CUNY board of trustees unanimously supported this decision.

In an editorial, the New York Daily News also applauded the decision, noting that Goldstein "has been striving to upgrade CUNY and its reputation. His actions in the Johnson case are testimony to that, sending the right message: Scholarship and teaching ability come first. And academic freedom is worth fighting for". Johnson later wrote his own account of the tenure battle for the History News Network website.

== Duke lacrosse case ==
Johnson played a prominent role in chronicling the Duke lacrosse case scandal, criticizing what he saw as violations of due process that characterized the case in a blog entitled "Durham in Wonderland", which he created solely for the purpose. Johnson's Durham in Wonderland contains one of the largest archives of events related to the case. Johnson holds critical views of some of Duke's faculty and staff, known as the Group of 88, and referred to them as a "rush-to-judgment mob" who had published an ad condemning players and encouraging protests against the falsely accused, much before the investigations had been concluded.

One of the accused, Reade Seligmann, thanked Johnson publicly, stating: "I am forever grateful for all of the care, concern, and encouragement I received from my remarkable girlfriend Brooke and her family, the Delbarton community, the town of Essex Fells, KC Johnson, and everyone else who chose to stand up, use their voice, and challenge the actions of a rogue district attorney." The prosecutor, Mike Nifong, was disbarred, fined, and sentenced to one day in jail.

Charles Piot, a Duke professor of cultural anthropology, criticized Johnson's role in the case, writing that Johnson "used the [case] to demonize faculty and further ideological agendas that are part of a broad-scale right-wing attack on progressive faculty across the nation." Johnson replied to Piot on his blog.

Johnson would go on to join Stuart Taylor, Jr. in co-writing the book Until Proven Innocent: Political Correctness and the Shameful Injustice of the Duke Lacrosse Case (ISBN 0-312-36912-3). It was published in September 2007. The New York Times book review referred to the book as a "riveting narrative" that has made a "gripping contribution to the literature of the wrongly accused." James Earl Coleman, Jr. and Prasad Kasibhatla, Duke professors, criticized Taylor and Johnson for "biased and inaccurate rhetoric". Johnson and Taylor replied to Coleman and Kasibhatla.

In December 2024, Crystal Mangum admitted, during a December 11, 2024 podcast interview, that she "made up a story that wasn't true" about the white lacrosse players who attended a party where she was hired to be a stripper.

== Political views ==
Johnson is a registered Democrat. He supported Barack Obama's 2008 presidential campaign and vehemently opposed the candidacy of John Edwards that year. Johnson has condemned the National Council for Accreditation of Teacher Education for promoting "social justice" as an essential element of teacher training, and for enacting policies which he argues are clearly intended "to screen out potential public school teachers who hold undesirable political beliefs."

== Works ==
=== Books ===
- Editor, On Cultural Ground: Essays in International History, Imprint Publications, 1994. ISBN 1-879176-21-1
- The Peace Progressives and American Foreign Relations, Harvard University Press, 1995. ISBN 0-674-65917-1
- Ernest Gruening and the American Dissenting Tradition, Harvard University Press, 1998. ISBN 0-674-26060-0
- January 20, 1961: The American Dream, DTV Publishers, 1999. (click DTV and then Katalog)
- co-editor (with David Shreve), The Presidential Recordings: Lyndon B. Johnson, volume 2, W.W. Norton, 2005. ISBN 0-393-06001-2
- co-editor (with Kent Germany), The Presidential Recordings: Lyndon B. Johnson, volume 3, W.W. Norton, 2005. ISBN 0-393-06001-2
- Congress and the Cold War, Cambridge University Press, 2005. ISBN 0-521-52885-2 (winner of the 2006 D.B. Hardeman Prize)
- co-author (with Stuart Taylor), Until Proven Innocent: Political Correctness and the Shameful Injustices of the Duke Lacrosse Rape Case, Thomas Dunne Books, 2007. ISBN 0-312-36912-3
- All the Way with LBJ: The 1964 Presidential Election, Cambridge University Press, 2009. ISBN 0-521-42595-6
- co-author (with Stuart Taylor), The Campus Rape Frenzy: The Attack on Due Process at America's Universities, Encounter Books, 2017. ISBN 1-594-03885-6

== Awards ==
- PSC-CUNY Award, 2002, History: "Running from Ahead: Lyndon Johnson and the 1964 Presidential Election."
- Philip Merrill Award for Outstanding Contributions to Liberal Arts Education, 2009

== See also ==
- 2006 Duke University lacrosse case
