= Tracey Cline =

Tracey Cline is an American attorney who was district attorney of Durham County, North Carolina from 2008 until her removal from office in 2012.

== Early life ==
Cline grew up Lincoln County, North Carolina and graduated from Livingstone College and the North Carolina Central University School of Law.

== Career ==
Cline began her legal career in 1989 as a public defender in Fayetteville, North Carolina. In 1993, she became a prosecutor in northeastern North Carolina. The following year, she became an assistant district attorney in Durham County. She spent over a decade the office and rose to the position of chief assistant district attorney, trying numerous, including homicides and sexual assaults. She was chief assistant district attorney during the Duke lacrosse rape case, which she claimed to have not been involved with, although she did assist investigators in writing an order for DNA testing of all but one member of the Duke lacrosse team.

In 2007, Cline was one of seven attorneys who sought to be appointed interim district attorney after Mike Nifong after he was removed from office for his conduct in the Duke lacrosse rape hoax. Governor Mike Easley chose to appoint another assistant DA, David J. Saacks. Cline chose to run district attorney in the 2008 election. She won the Democratic primary with 46% of the vote and was unopposed in the general election.

In 2011, The News & Observer published a four-part investigative series on four cases in which the North Carolina State Bureau of Investigation performed questionable work and Cline was alleged to have withheld evidence from the defense. Cline sued the newspaper for libel, but the case was dismissed after Cline failed to respond to court papers in a timely manner.

In 2012, attorney Kerry Sutton petitioned to have Cline removed from office for "habitual intemperance and conduct prejudicial to the administration of justice", citing her attacks on Superior Court Judge Orlando Hudson. On January 27, 2012, Franklin County Judge Robert Hobgood found that there was no evidence of habitual intemperance, but the claims of conduct prejudicial to the administration of justice had merit. A removal hearing was held on March 2, 2012, and Hobgood ruled that Cline's public accusations that Hudson was biased against her was "not supported by facts" and "brought the office of Durham District Attorney into disrepute". Hobgood ordered Cline immediately removed from office. In 2015, the North Carolina state bar suspended Cline's license for five years. It was reinstated in 2018.
