= Richard H. Brodhead =

American scholar

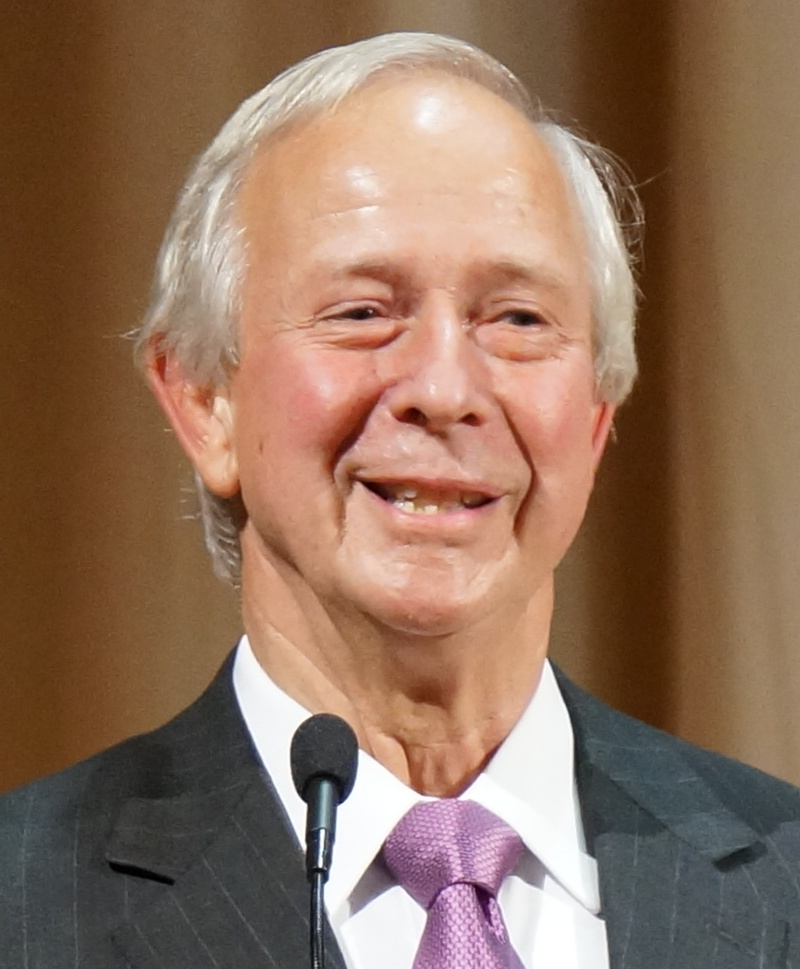
- Brodhead in 2013

9th President of Duke University
- In office July 1, 2004 – July 1, 2017
- Preceded by: Nan Keohane
- Succeeded by: Vincent Price

Dean of Yale College
- In office July 1, 1993 – July 1, 2004
- Preceded by: Donald Engelman
- Succeeded by: Peter Salovey

Personal details
- Born: Richard Halleck Brodhead; April 17, 1947 (age 79) Dayton, Ohio, U.S.
- Education: Yale University (BA, MPhil, PhD)

Richard Halleck Brodhead (born April 17, 1947) is an American scholar of 19th-century American literature. He is a former dean of Yale College, and served as the 9th president of Duke University in North Carolina, from 2004 to 2017.

== Early life and education ==
Brodhead was born April 17, 1947, in Dayton, Ohio. His family moved to Fairfield, Connecticut when he was six years old, where he attended public schools. He attended Phillips Academy, where his high school classmates included Dick Wolf and George W. Bush. He attended Yale University, where, during his senior year, he was tapped for membership in the secret society Manuscript and as a member of the Elizabethan Club. He received a Bachelor of Arts, summa cum laude, in 1968, a Master of Philosophy in 1970, and continued at Yale for graduate school, earning a Ph.D. in English in 1972. He met his wife, Cynthia Degnan, while both were graduate students at Yale.

== Yale College ==
After receiving his Ph.D. in 1972, Brodhead was appointed an assistant professor of English at Yale. In 1980, he received tenure and was named director of undergraduate studies in English. By 1985, he had been made a full professor, then was named chair of the English department in 1987 as Bird White Housum Professor of English in 1990, and the A. Giamatti Professor of English in 1995. He was appointed Dean of Yale College in 1993, overseeing faculty appointments and undergraduates until 2004. Yale President Richard C. Levin formed a committee in 2001 on Yale College education to conduct a major curricular review of its undergraduate program, appointing Brodhead as its chairman.

An expert in 19th-century American literature, Brodhead has written or edited more than a dozen books on Nathaniel Hawthorne, Herman Melville, Charles W. Chesnutt, William Faulkner, Harriet Beecher Stowe, Louisa May Alcott, Richard Wright and Eudora Welty, among others, and was elected to the American Academy of Arts and Sciences in 2004. Brodhead won the DeVane Medal for outstanding teaching at Yale and spent eight summers teaching high school teachers at the Bread Loaf School of English at Middlebury, Vermont. He has lectured at universities in the United States, Europe, and Asia, and a collections of his leadership and liberal arts education writings were published by Yale in 2004, as The Good of this Place; Values and Challenges in Higher Education.

As dean and as a professor supervising graduate students, Brodhead was involved in the controversy surrounding efforts by graduate student-employees (GESO) to unionize. In 2003, he was added as a defendant, along with Richard Levin and Linda Lorimer, to a 2001 lawsuit by Yale professor James Van de Velde, claiming damage of reputation, after being named an official suspect in the murder of his student, Suzanne Jovin; Brodhead had subsequently canceled his class, citing Van de Velde's presence as a "major distraction." In 2007, a Connecticut judge permitted the reopening of Velde's lawsuit against the New Haven Police Department and Yale, which subsequently also included senior university officials; the suit was settled in 2013.

== Duke University ==
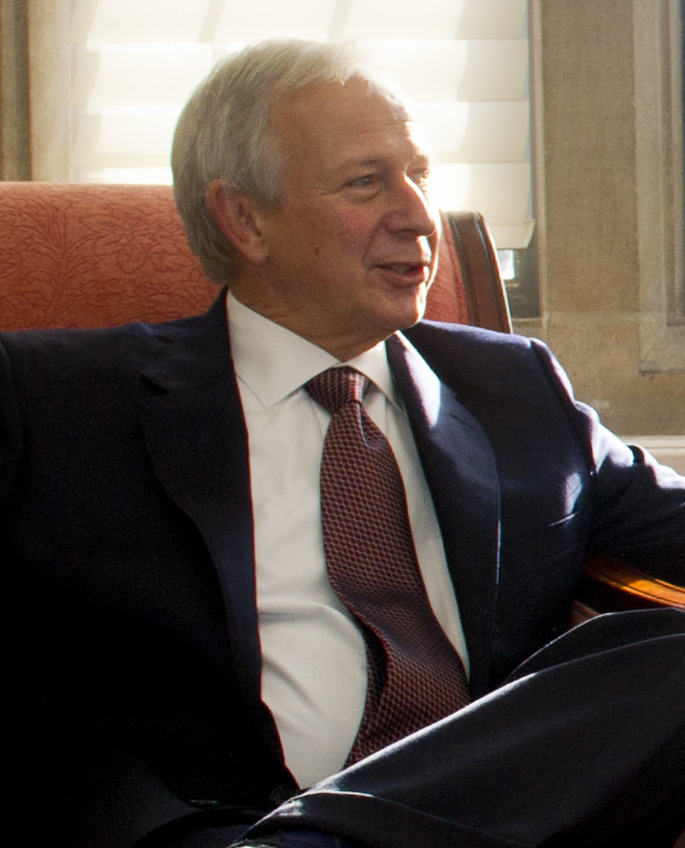
Brodhead in 2012

He left New Haven in 2004 to become President of Duke University, succeeding Nan Keohane. He was the first university president to live on campus since the 1960s, residing in the J. Deryl Hart House, the official presidential residence. Much of his leadership at Duke was focused on enriching the undergraduate experience of Duke students and expanding the university’s financial aid endowment to ensure that a Duke education is accessible to qualified students regardless of their family’s financial circumstances. He called for Duke to become an international center in addressing health care inequities through a major global health initiative involving faculty and schools across the university, and championed Duke’s efforts to bring the results of faculty and student research through a translational societal process. Brodhead was also active in Durham, promoting K-12 public education, several new community health clinics, neighborhood revitalization through the Duke-Durham Neighborhood Partnership, and the future strategic direction of the Research Triangle Park Brodhead led the successful Financial Aid Initiative, which raised $308.5 million for need-based scholarships at Duke at its conclusion in 2008. His signature program was DukeEngage, which "empowers students to address critical human needs through immersive service.

He made globalization a major strategic priority for the University. Under his leadership Duke established the Duke Global Health Institute, an interdisciplinary center that works to translate research findings to address health care inequities and improve the health of people around the world. He oversaw the creation of the Duke-NUS Graduate Medical School in partnership with the National University of Singapore. Duke Kunshan University, a new joint venture institution created by Duke University and Wuhan University in China, opened in August 2014, offering degree and non-degree academic programs for students from China and around the world. Brodhead led Duke Forward, a fundraising campaign, and the largest campaign in Duke’s history, raising $3.78 billion by 2017.

On April 28, 2016, Brodhead announced that he would end his tenure as Duke's president on June 30, 2017, then take a one-year sabbatical before returning to academia as a writer and instructor. That November, the Duke University Trinity College of Arts & Sciences visitors board established the annual undergraduate Brodhead Service Award in his name. His liberal arts education writings were published by Duke in 2017, as Speaking of Duke: Leading the 21st Century University. That May, the Duke University board of trustees chose to name the West Union building as the Richard H. Brodhead Center for Campus Life.

=== Duke lacrosse case ===
As president, Brodhead faced controversy during the Duke lacrosse case, after three members of the nationally ranked men's lacrosse team were falsely accused of raping a stripper who had been hired to perform at an off-campus team party on March 13, 2006. Brodhead stated, on March 25, 2006, that "our students must be presumed innocent until proven otherwise" and that "whatever they did is bad enough", while talking about sexual assault and racism in society. Brodhead canceled the remainder of the 2006 season, and Duke's lacrosse coach Mike Pressler resigned.

On December 20, 2006, Brodhead stated that "the DA's case will be on trial just as much as our students will be". On January 3, 2007, Brodhead invited the accused students back to Duke as students in good standing and members of the lacrosse team while they still faced charges. On April 11, 2007, the N.C. Attorney General's Office dropped all charges against the players, declared them innocent, and called them victims of a rogue prosecutor's "tragic rush to accuse". Later, Brodhead apologized in a public forum for the university's "failure to reach out" in a "time of extraordinary peril". He was among over 30 individuals named as defendants in a lawsuit filed in 2007 by the unindicted members of the lacrosse team, which was settled in 2008. In December 2024, the accuser, Crystal Mangum, admitted, during a December 11, 2024 podcast interview, that she "made up a story that wasn't true" about the lacrosse players.

== Boards ==
During his tenure at Duke, in 2011, the American Academy of Arts and Sciences was congressionally mandated to convene The Commission on the Humanities and Social Sciences, appointing Brodhead co-chair. The Commission released its report, The Heart of the Matter, in June 2013.

He was appointed to the J. William Fulbright Foreign Scholarship Board, the board of trustees of the Carnegie Corporation of New York. He has served on the Federal Bureau of Investigation’s National Security Higher Education Advisory Board, and, since 2013, as a trustee of the Andrew W. Mellon Foundation. He has received honorary degrees from American institutions, as well as from Tsinghua University in Beijing.

== See also ==
- History of Duke University
- Duke lacrosse rape hoax
- J. Deryl Hart House
