= Group of 88 =

Group of Duke University professors

The Group of 88 is the term applied to professors at Duke University in North Carolina who in April 2006 signed a controversial advertisement in The Chronicle, the university's independent student newspaper. The advertisement addressed the Duke lacrosse case of the previous month, in which a black stripper falsely accused three white members of Duke's lacrosse team of raping her at a party. The incident was under police investigation when the ad was published, and the signatories were criticized for commenting on the case at that stage. They stated that they were trying to start a dialog about issues of race and sexual assault at the university.

On April 11, 2007, the N.C. Attorney General's Office dropped all charges against the players, declaring them innocent, and called them victims of a rogue prosecutor's "tragic rush to accuse".

In December 2024, Crystal Mangum admitted, during a December 11, 2024 podcast interview from prison, that she "made up a story that wasn't true" about the white lacrosse players who attended a party where she was hired to be a stripper.

== Background ==
=== Duke lacrosse rape hoax ===
Crystal Mangum, an African-American student at North Carolina Central University who worked part-time as a stripper, was hired to perform at a party held on March 13, 2006 at the house of two of the lacrosse team's captains in Durham, North Carolina. Several hours after the party, after becoming involved in an altercation that required police assistance, Mangum told police that three white Duke University lacrosse team members had raped her. Her allegations were later shown to be false and without basis.

=== Background of the Chronicle advertisement ===
Publicity about the scandal spread quickly. National media highlighted the class and racial differences between Mangum and the players. At an African & African-American Studies forum on March 29 at Duke, organizers invited students "to voice their frustration with the current situation and, it became apparent, with the university as a whole". The students' remarks formed the basis for the advertisement.

The ad, entitled "What Does a Social Disaster Sound Like?", included compiled quotes from students at the forum, who were expressing concerns about conditions at Duke. The page cited anonymous student claims of sexism and racial harassment at the Duke campus. Students were encouraged to continue to express their concerns. 88 Duke Humanities professors signed their names to the open letter.

== Commentary and criticism ==
=== National media ===
John Podhoretz wrote in the New York Post that: "The school has perhaps 700 professors who teach undergrads. So, at a moment when Duke students were being shadowed by a rape accusation, one-ninth of their professoriate had effectively declared that those students did not deserve the presumption of innocence – primarily because so many of their fellow students were supposedly being victimized by the atmosphere of 'racism and sexism.'" Podhoretz quoted Stephen Baldwin, a professor of chemistry who said: "There was a collision between political correctness and due process, and political correctness won."

In Howard Wasserman's book Institutional Failures (2010), he cites a university investigation at the time into the lacrosse players' personal behavior by Duke Law School professor James Earl Coleman. He found that the players charged with alleged rape were "good students who caused no problems in the class, treated Duke staffers with respect...and had no record of sexist, racist, or other forms of anti-social behavior."

=== Duke students and faculty ===
Kim Curtis, a visiting associate professor in the Political Science department who specializes in political and feminist theory, was among the signers of the April 2006 piece in The Chronicle. That semester she failed two members of the lacrosse team who were in one of her classes, which nearly prevented one student from graduating. When one of them appealed the grade, Duke did not act immediately. Eventually the university administration raised his grade from "F" to "D". Kyle Dowd and his parents sued Curtis and the university. Duke later settled, and recorded his grade as "Pass".

Michael Gustafson, a Duke engineering professor cited in Johnson and Taylor's 2010 book, expressed concerns that restrictions on stereotyping had not been observed and after the scandal broke, the student athletes were assumed to be guilty. He suggested that the accused lacrosse players had not been evaluated as individuals, but as caricatures, making it easier for commentators to criticize them.

English professor Cathy Davidson was among those who signed the ad. She published an Opinion piece in the Raleigh News & Observer in January 2007, saying that the ad "expressed the anguish of students who felt demeaned by racist and sexist remarks swirling around in the media and on the campus quad in the aftermath of what happened on March 13 in the lacrosse house."

In 2007, ten months after the April 10 open letter or advertisement in The Chronicle, a group of 17 economics faculty signed an alternative petition, stating "the Group of 88 does not speak for all Duke faculty".

== "Clarifying" letter ==
Numerous professors who had signed the open letter continued to be concerned as the case was investigated. They established a website entitled Concerned Duke Faculty. On January 16, 2007, "An Open Letter to the Duke Community" was posted at the website. It was signed by 87 faculty members, many of whom had been among the "Group of 88".

They said that the original piece had been misinterpreted and that they had intended it to address issues of racism and sexism in the community, not to prejudge the Mangum alleged rape case: "We reject all attempts to try the case outside the courts, and stand firmly by the principle of the presumption of innocence." They also refused "to retract the ad or apologize for it." Their January letter said that Duke fosters an "atmosphere that allows sexism, racism, and sexual violence to be so prevalent on campus."

== Aftermath ==
In 2007, the North Carolina Attorney General dropped charges against the lacrosse players and declared them innocent.

A 2007 poll of Duke faculty found that 82 percent of those responding were "troubled by the actions by the Group of 88."

Durham County District Attorney Mike Nifong was convicted of criminal contempt of court for lying to a judge in his pursuit of charges against the three lacrosse players.

In 2013, Crystal Mangum was sentenced to a minimum of 14 years in prison for the second-degree murder of her boyfriend.
