= Disbarment =

Removal of a lawyer from a bar association or the practice of law

Disbarment, also known as striking off, is the removal of a lawyer from a bar association or the practice of law, thus revoking their law license or admission to practice law. Disbarment is usually a punishment for unethical or criminal conduct but may also be imposed for incompetence or incapacity. Procedures vary depending on the law society; temporary disbarment may be called suspension.

== Australia ==
In Australia, states regulate the Legal Profession under state law despite many participating in a uniform scheme. Admission as a lawyer is the business of the admissions board and the Supreme Court. Disciplinary proceedings may be commenced by the Bar Association, the Law Society of which one is a member, or the board itself.

== Germany ==
In Germany, a Berufsverbot is a ban on practicing a profession, which the government can issue to a lawyer for misconduct, Volksverhetzung or for serious mismanagement of personal finances.

In April 1933, the Nazi government issued a Berufsverbot forbidding the practice of law by Jews, Communists, and other political opponents, except for those protected by the Frontkämpferprivileg.

== United Kingdom ==
In the United Kingdom, the removal of the licence to practise of a barrister or Scottish advocate is called being "disbarred", whilst the removal of a solicitor from the rolls in England and Wales, Scotland, or Northern Ireland is called being "struck off".

== United States ==
=== Overview ===
Generally, disbarment is imposed as a sanction for conduct indicating that an attorney is not fit to practice law, willfully disregarding a client's interests, commingling funds, or engaging in fraud that impedes the administration of justice. In some states, any lawyer who is convicted of a felony is automatically suspended pending further disciplinary proceedings, or, in New York, automatically disbarred. Automatic disbarment, although opposed by the American Bar Association, has been described as a convicted felon's just deserts.

In the United States legal system, disbarment is specific to regions; one can be disbarred from some courts while still being a member of the bar in another jurisdiction. However, under the American Bar Association's Model Rules of Professional Conduct, which have been adopted in most states, disbarment in one state or court is grounds for disbarment in a jurisdiction which has adopted the Model Rules.

Disbarment is quite rare: in 2011, only 1,046 lawyers were disbarred. Instead, lawyers are usually sanctioned by their clients through civil malpractice proceedings, or via fine, censure, suspension, or other punishments from the disciplinary boards. To be disbarred is considered a great embarrassment and shame, even if one no longer wishes to continue a career in law.

Because disbarment rules vary by area, different rules can apply depending on where a lawyer is disbarred. Notably, most US states have no procedure for permanently disbarring a person. Depending on the jurisdiction, a lawyer may reapply to the bar immediately, after five to seven years, or be banned for life.

=== Notable U.S. disbarments ===
In the 20th and 21st centuries, one former U.S. president and one former U.S. vice president have been disbarred, and another former president has been suspended from one bar and forced to resign from another bar rather than face disbarment.

Former vice president Spiro Agnew, having pleaded no contest (which subjects a person to the same criminal penalties as a guilty plea but is not an admission of guilt for a civil suit) to charges of bribery and tax evasion, was disbarred from Maryland, the state of which he had previously been governor.

Former president Richard Nixon was disbarred from New York in 1976 for obstruction of justice related to the Watergate scandal. He had attempted to resign from the New York bar, as he had done with California and the Supreme Court, but his resignation was not accepted as he would not acknowledge that he was unable to defend himself from the charges brought against him.

In 2001, following a 5-year suspension by the Arkansas bar, the United States Supreme Court suspended Bill Clinton from the United States Supreme Court bar, providing 40 days for him to contest disbarment. He resigned before the end of the 40 days, thus avoiding disbarment.

Alger Hiss was disbarred for a felony conviction but later became the first person reinstated to the bar in Massachusetts after disbarment.

In 2007, Mike Nifong, the District Attorney of Durham County, North Carolina who presided over the 2006 Duke University lacrosse case, was disbarred for prosecutorial misconduct related to his handling of the case.

In April 2012, a three-member panel appointed by the Arizona Supreme Court voted unanimously to disbar Andrew Thomas, former County Attorney of Maricopa County, Arizona, and a former close confederate of Maricopa County Sheriff Joe Arpaio. According to the panel, Thomas "outrageously exploited power, flagrantly fostered fear, and disgracefully misused the law" while serving as Maricopa County Attorney. The panel found "clear and convincing evidence" that Thomas brought unfounded and malicious criminal and civil charges against political opponents, including four state judges and the state attorney general. "Were this a criminal case," the panel concluded, "we are confident that the evidence would establish this conspiracy beyond a reasonable doubt."

Jack Thompson, the Florida lawyer noted for his activism against Howard Stern, video games, and rap music, was permanently disbarred for various charges of misconduct. The action resulted from several grievances claiming that Thompson had made defamatory, false statements and attempted to humiliate, embarrass, harass, or intimidate his opponents. The order was made on September 25, 2008, effective October 25. However, Thompson tried to appeal to the higher courts to avoid the penalty taking effect. Neither the US District Court nor the US Supreme Court would hear his appeal, rendering the judgment of the Florida Supreme Court final.

Ed Fagan, a New York lawyer who prominently represented Holocaust victims against Swiss banks, was disbarred in New York (in 2008) and New Jersey (in 2009) for failing to pay court fines and fees; and for misappropriating client and escrow trust funds.

F. Lee Bailey, noted criminal defense attorney, was disbarred by Florida in 2001, with reciprocal disbarment in Massachusetts in 2002. The Florida disbarment resulted from his stock handling in the DuBoc marijuana case. Bailey was found guilty of 7 counts of attorney misconduct by the Florida Supreme Court. Bailey had transferred a large portion of DuBoc's assets into his own accounts, using the interest gained on those assets to pay for personal expenses. In March 2005, Bailey filed to regain his law license in Massachusetts. The book Florida Pulp Nonfiction details the peculiar facts of the DuBoc case and extended interviews with Bailey, including his own defense. Bailey is also best known for representing murder suspect O. J. Simpson in 1994.

Richard P. Liebowitz, a New York attorney focused on copyrights held by photographers, was disbarred by the state of New York in 2024 following suspension from the practice of law in the Southern District of New York. His disbarment followed what was described as a "pattern and practice of failing to comply with court orders and making false statements to the court" and multiple lawsuits wherein Liebowitz was sanctioned for misconduct.

Rudy Giuliani was disbarred in New York and Washington, D.C., for false allegations about mass voter fraud and his participation in the January 6, 2021, attack on the United States Capitol to subvert the 2020 Presidential Election.

In 2022, Thomas Girardi was disbarred in California due to large-scale misappropriation of funds from clients.

== See also ==
- Legal malpractice
