= Stuart Taylor Jr. =

American journalist and author

Stuart Taylor Jr. (born 1948) is an American journalist, author, and lawyer. He has served as a fellow at the Brookings Institution. He was a reporter for the Baltimore Sun from 1971 to 1974; The New York Times from 1980 to 1988, covering legal affairs and then primarily the Supreme Court; wrote commentaries and long features for The American Lawyer, Legal Times and their affiliates from 1989 to 1997, and for National Journal and Newsweek from 1998 through 2010. He has coauthored two books.

== Career ==
Taylor graduated in 1970 from Princeton University and in 1977 from Harvard Law School, magna cum laude. He was an associate from 1977 to 1980 at the D.C. law firm of WilmerHale. Taylor comments on legal affairs and political issues and often focuses on the Supreme Court, appearing frequently in other publications such as The Atlantic, Slate, The New Republic, and The Wall Street Journal.

== Books ==
He is the co-author, with Professor KC Johnson of Brooklyn College, of Until Proven Innocent: Political Correctness and the Shameful Injustice of the Duke Lacrosse Case (ISBN 0-312-36912-3). It was published in September 2007. In the book, Johnson and Taylor recount in detail the entire story of the Duke lacrosse case, and explore some of its lessons as regards, for example, the reliability of prosecutors, the trustworthiness of the media, and the role of extreme political ideology in the academy. Jeffrey Rosen in the New York Times Sunday Book Review' referred to the book as a "riveting narrative" and stated that "Taylor and Johnson have made a gripping contribution to the literature of the wrongly accused. They remind us of the importance of constitutional checks on prosecutorial abuse. And they emphasize the lesson that Duke callously advised its own students to ignore: if you're unjustly suspected of any crime, immediately call the best lawyer you can afford."

In 2012, Richard Sander and Taylor coauthored Mismatch: How Affirmative Action Hurts Students It's Intended to Help, and Why Universities Won't Admit It. Judge Richard A. Posner wrote: "This lucid, data-rich book is simply the best researched and most convincing analysis ever done of affirmative action in higher education, a work at once impeccably scholarly and entirely accessible to anyone interested in the social and legal ramifications of well-intentioned policies that, as the authors show, have a boomerang effect on the intended beneficiaries."
