= Durham County Justice Center =

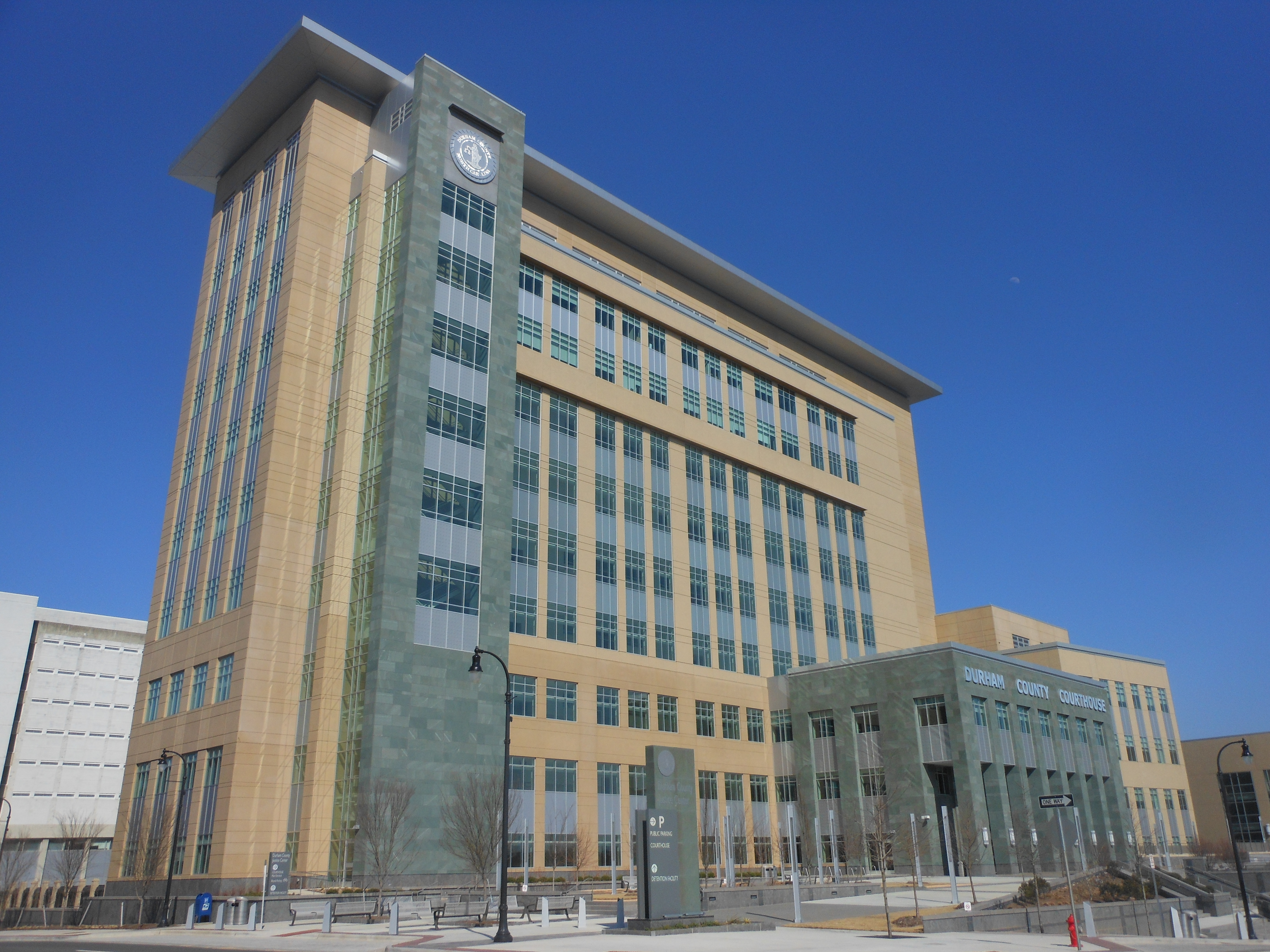

- Location in North Carolina Location in United States

General information
- Location: 510 South Dillard St, Durham, North Carolina, United States
- Coordinates: 35.9916°N 78.9027°W
- Opened: 2013
- Cost: $120 million

Technical details
- Size: 318,533
- Floor count: 11 (courtrooms = 20)

Design and construction
- Architect: O'Brien/Atkins Associates
- Main contractor: Whiting-Turner

The Durham County Justice Center is a civic building in downtown Durham, North Carolina. The $120 million building opened to the public in February 2013. The building houses the Durham County Sheriff's Office, the Durham County District Attorney's Office, and has 20 courtrooms. The building is 318,533 square feet and was built to LEED Gold Standards. The Justice Center was built with sustainable materials and includes lawns on its roofs for insulation and to capture runoff. It is one of the tallest buildings in Durham and dominates the downtown skyline from NC 147.

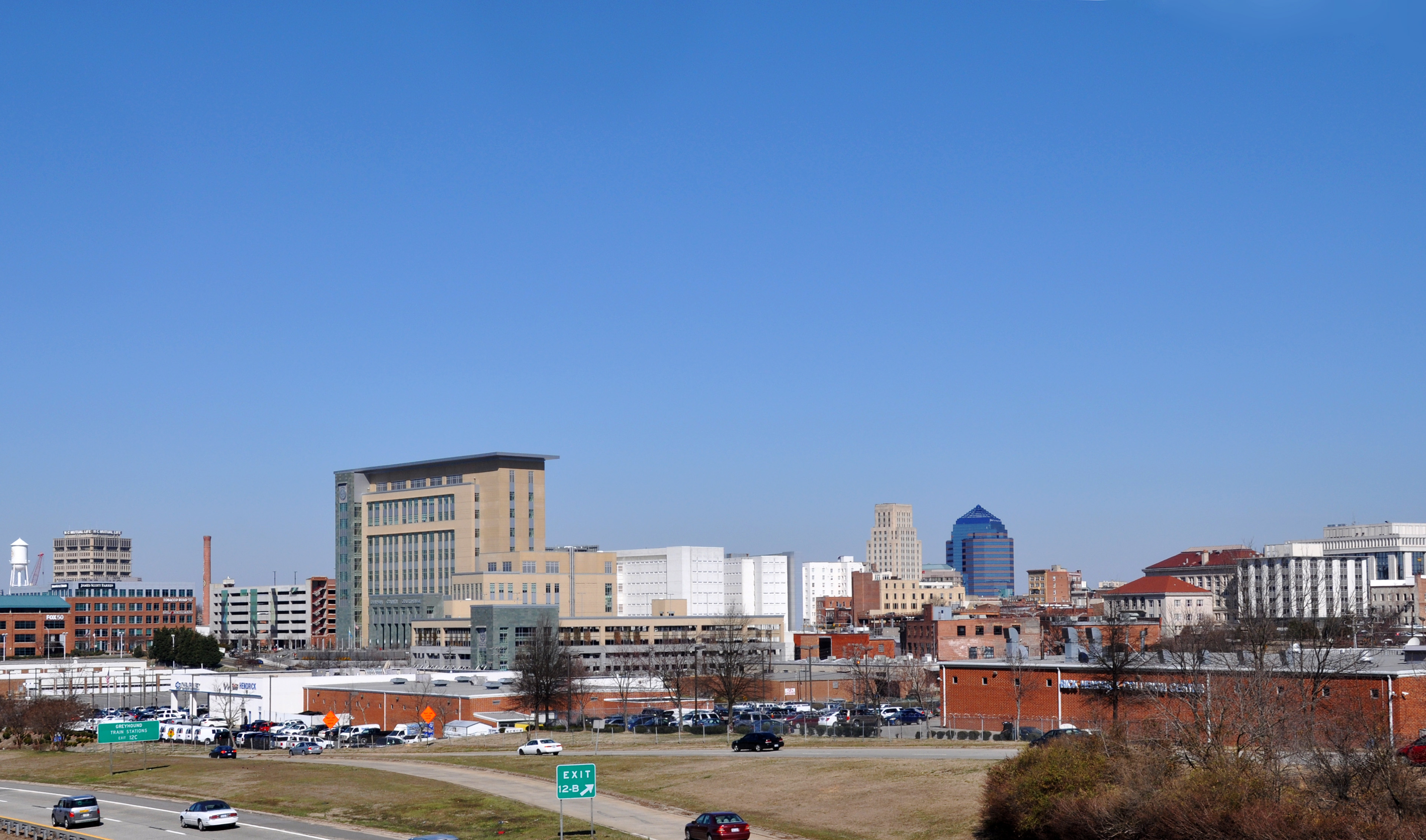
Durham County Justice Center's impact on the downtown Durham skyline
