= Duke Chronicle =

Student newspaper of Duke University, North Carolina, US

The Chronicle
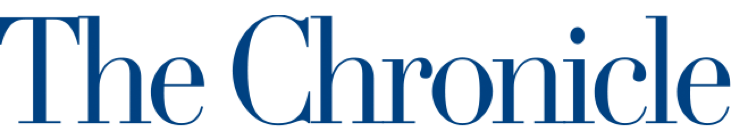

- The front page from September 7, 2020
- Type: Student newspaper
- Owner: Duke Student Publishing Company
- Editor-in-chief: Dylan Halper
- Managing editor: Abby DiSalvo
- News editor: Claire Cranford, Ryan Kilgallen, and Ella Moore
- Opinion editor: Devyn Deschamps
- Photo editor: Alex Long and Wanyu Zhang
- Founded: December 19, 1905; 120 years ago
- Language: English
- Headquarters: Durham, North Carolina
- Website: dukechronicle.com

The Chronicle is a daily student newspaper at Duke University in Durham, North Carolina. It was first published as The Trinity Chronicle on December 19, 1905. In 1924 Trinity College was renamed Duke University following a donation by James Buchanan Duke, and in 1925 the paper became The Chronicle. The nameplate was changed to The Duke Chronicle in 1933. During 1970, the nameplate was changed to The Chronicle (stylized in lowercase) with the subtitle "Duke's Daily Newspaper" (stylized in uppercase and italics) In 1974 it briefly became The Duke Chronicle again before switching to The Chronicle (with no stylization or subtitle).

== History ==
The Chronicle has a staff of 120, mostly volunteers, including undergraduates at Duke Kunshan University. Its coverage gained national significance in light of the 2006 Duke lacrosse team scandal. The paper is independent of the university and as such is governed by a board composed largely of former staff members.

In June 2013, The Chronicle announced it was cutting one day of print heading into the 2013–14 academic year, the paper's 109th volume. The paper's editors and board members emphasized the change was part of a commitment to a digital-first strategy, not the product of financial pressures. The paper gradually cut print production and now only uses print for special sections, focusing instead on online content.

At the 2009 Associated Collegiate Press National College Media Convention in Austin, Texas, the paper won the Best in Show category for four-year daily tabloids. In 2007, The Chronicle took home four awards from the ACP, including Online Story of the Year for its ongoing coverage of the Duke lacrosse scandal. In 2006, the paper took second place in the Best in Show category in St. Louis, Missouri. Towerview, a monthly newsmagazine distributed with the paper, won Best in Show in the Magazine Feature-Special Audience Category, while its editor, Alex Fanaroff, won first place in the "features story" category. The Chronicle's former editor, Ryan McCartney, placed third in the four-year reporter of the year category. The paper also won Best in Show in the tabloid division in 2005 in Kansas City, Missouri, and finished in second place in Editorials that year. In addition, Towerview took home fifth-place honors in the magazine division. In October 2015, The Chronicle was again honored by the Associated College Press, taking home its first Online Pacemaker Award, sharing honors with The Daily Orange and The Stanford Daily. DegreeChoices awarded The Duke Chronicle 8th place in the U.S. for Most Organic Traffic. The newspaper had 87,097 website visits during the 2021–2022 academic year. That same year, it was recorded as having 236,090 total social media shares, making it the 7th highest in the U.S.

Journalist and New York magazine founder Clay Felker was an editor of The Chronicle while a student at Duke in the 1950s. The Washington Post sports reporter John Feinstein was a sports writer for The Chronicle and was its sports editor for two years. The Wall Street Journal travel editor Scott McCartney was editor of The Chronicle in the 1980s. Recent former Chronicle writers have gone on to work for The Wall Street Journal, Bloomberg News, The Atlantic, PolitiFact, USA Today, The Raleigh News and Observer and The Providence Journal, among other publications.

The paper has an annual award in honor of Matt Sclafani, the newspaper's editor for the 1990–91 school year, who was diagnosed with leukemia during his term and died in 1992.

== Coverage during the pandemic ==
Volume 116 of The Chronicle covered Duke, students and faculty during the COVID-19 pandemic. Despite several staff members working remotely, they moved to one day of print per week, and expanded the digital presence while still publishing roughly 20 stories per week throughout the semester. Editor-in-chief Matthew Griffin, Managing Editor Maria Morrison, Sports Editor Evan Kolin, News Editors Mona Tong and Carter Forinash, Editorial Editor Mihir Bellamkonda, and Senior Editor Rose Wong formed the upper mast team for the volume. This volume was awarded a National Pacemaker Award by the National Scholastic Press Association for its coverage.
