= Crystal Mangum =

American stripper and murderer (born 1978)

- Born: Crystal Gail Mangum; July 18, 1978 (age 48); Durham, North Carolina, U.S.
- Occupation: Stripper
- Spouse: Kenneth McNeill (divorced)
- Children: 3
- Status: Released
- Conviction: Second degree murder
- Penalty: 14 to 18 years imprisonment

Details
- Victims: Reginald Daye
- Date: April 3, 2011

Crystal Gail Mangum (born July 18, 1978) is an American former stripper from Durham, North Carolina, who was incarcerated for murder from 2013 until her release in February 2026. In 2006, she came to attention in national news reports for having made false allegations of rape against lacrosse players in the Duke lacrosse rape hoax. Mangum's work in the sex industry as a black woman, while the young men she accused were white, generated extensive media interest and academic debate about race, class, gender, and the politicization of the justice system. In December 2024, Mangum admitted to fabricating the assault.

In February 2010, she was charged with the attempted murder of her then live-in partner, Milton Walker, but was convicted of contributing to the delinquency of a juvenile, injury to personal property and resisting a public officer.

In November 2013, she was found guilty of second-degree murder after she stabbed boyfriend Reginald Daye, who died 10 days after. She argued that she acted in self-defense, saying that she feared Daye would kill her. She was sentenced to 14 to 18 years in prison.

== Early life ==
Mangum was born and grew up in Durham, North Carolina, the daughter of Travis Mangum, a truck driver, and his wife Mary. She was the youngest of three children. She attended Hillside High School, graduating in 1996.

In 1996, Mangum filed a police report alleging that three years earlier, when she was 14, she had been kidnapped by three assailants, driven to Creedmoor, North Carolina, and raped. One of those she accused was her boyfriend, who was 21 at the time, which would constitute statutory rape. She subsequently backed away from the charges, a move relatives claimed was motivated by fear for her life. Mangum's father said he did not believe she was raped or injured, though her mother believed such an incident could have occurred—but not in 1993. She thinks it is more likely to have happened when Crystal was 17 or 18 years old, shortly before she made the police report. Mangum's ex-husband, Kenneth Nathanial McNeill, believed the incident occurred as she said it did.

After graduation from high school in 1996, Mangum joined the U.S. Navy. She trained to operate radios and navigation technology. While serving in the Navy, Mangum married McNeill. Her marriage quickly broke down. Mangum reported to police that her husband had threatened to kill her, but the charge was dismissed when she failed to appear in court. She served for less than two years in the Navy before being discharged after becoming pregnant by a fellow sailor, with whom she went on to have another child.

By 2002, Mangum had returned to Durham and was working as a stripper. In 2002, she was arrested on 10 charges after stealing the taxicab of a customer to whom she had given a lap dance. This prompted a police pursuit at speeds of up to 70 miles per hour, occasionally in the wrong lane. After being stopped, Mangum nearly ran over a police officer, succeeding only in hitting his patrol vehicle. She was found to have a blood alcohol content of over twice the legal limit. Ultimately, Mangum pleaded guilty to four counts: assault on a government official, larceny, speeding to elude arrest, and driving while impaired. She served three weekends in jail, paid $4,200 in restitution and fees, and was given two years' probation.

In 2004, Mangum earned an associate degree from Durham Technical Community College, and subsequently enrolled full-time at North Carolina Central University. At the time of the rape allegations, she was in her second year, studying police psychology, and earning a 3.0 average.

== Duke lacrosse rape hoax ==
In March 2006, Mangum was hired as an exotic dancer at a party organized by members of the Duke University men's lacrosse team. After arriving in an intoxicated state, having earlier consumed alcohol and cyclobenzaprine, to perform with another dancer at a house rented by three of the team captains, she became involved in an argument with the occupants of the residence and subsequently left.

Mangum then became involved in an altercation with her fellow dancer that necessitated police assistance. The officer who arrived on scene took her to a local drug and mental health center, where she was in the process of being involuntarily committed when, after being asked a leading question, she made a false allegation that she had been sexually assaulted at the party. District Attorney Mike Nifong, who was up for re-election, pursued the case despite questions about the credibility of Mangum, and conspired with a DNA lab director to withhold exculpatory evidence that would have cleared the lacrosse players of the sexual assault accusations. It took almost a year for the state's attorney general's office to dismiss the charges and declare that the players were innocent of the charges laid against them by Nifong.

In 2008, Mangum published a memoir, The Last Dance for Grace: The Crystal Mangum Story, written with Vincent Clark. The book gives an unsubstantiated version of events, and she continued to insist on the debunked claim that she was assaulted at the party. Mangum claimed that the dropping of the case was politically motivated. The book also outlines her earlier life, reasserting her claim that she was raped at the age of 14.

On December 11, 2024, in an on-camera interview, Mangum admitted to providing false testimony against the Duke lacrosse players, stating: "I testified falsely against them by saying that they raped me when they didn't, and that was wrong, and I betrayed the trust of a lot of other people who believed in me. [I] made up a story that wasn't true because I wanted validation from people and not from God."

== Attempted murder and murder conviction ==
Just before midnight on February 17, 2010, Durham police were called to Mangum's residence by her nine-year-old daughter. They said that, when they arrived, they found Mangum and her live-in partner, Milton Walker, fighting. She reportedly set fire to some of his clothing in a bathtub in their presence. The building suffered heavy smoke damage. They arrested Mangum on charges of attempted murder, first-degree arson, assault and battery, identity theft, communicating threats, damage to property, resisting an officer, and misdemeanor child abuse.

Mangum was ordered to remain in jail on $1 million bond. Her bond was lowered to $100,000 in May, and she was released from jail to live in a friend's house. She was required to wear an electronic monitoring device. On July 12, 2010, Mangum was released from house arrest and required to move in with her mother. She was allowed to visit her three children but only under supervision of social services. Mangum was arrested again on August 25, 2010, and held on $150,000 bond for failure to comply with the restrictions on her child visitation order.

On December 17, 2010, Mangum was convicted of contributing to the delinquency of a juvenile, injury to personal property and resisting a public officer. The jury deadlocked 9–3 in favor of a verdict of not guilty on the felony arson charge and was unable to reach a decision on it.

After the verdict, Judge Abe Jones sentenced Mangum to 88 days in jail, which she had already served, and left the custody decision in the hands of social services. Durham Assistant District Attorney Mark McCullough announced on January 21, 2011, that he would not retry Mangum on arson charges.

=== Second-degree murder conviction ===
Mangum was arrested on April 3, 2011, following accusations that she repeatedly stabbed and seriously injured a boyfriend, Reginald Daye. She was charged with assault with a deadly weapon with intent to kill or inflicting serious bodily injury, a class C felony in North Carolina. Ten days later, Daye died in the hospital, and Mangum was indicted on a murder charge. Mangum was held in jail under a $300,000 secured bail bond, which was set prior to her boyfriend's death. On November 1, 2011, Mangum was deemed competent to stand trial for murder.

On May 1, 2012, Mangum's attorney withdrew, citing the release by Mangum of confidential information regarding her case to her supporters. On February 20, 2013, Mangum was released on bail until trial.

At the trial, Mangum argued that she stabbed Daye in self-defense, as she was being assaulted by him. The prosecution argued that the forensic evidence supported Daye's dying statement that he was attempting to get away from Mangum when he was stabbed.

On November 22, 2013, she was convicted of second-degree murder by a jury of seven men and five women. Judge Paul Ridgeway sentenced her to serve a minimum of 14 years and two months and a maximum of 17 years and nine months in prison.

In 2015, Mangum filed for an appeal of her 2013 conviction due to testimony allowed during trial related to an argument with a man in 2010. She later filed grievances with the North Carolina Bar Association against the attorney that filed the appeal and her attorneys from the 2013 murder trial. The bar declined to take any action.

In 2018, Mangum appeared before Superior Court Judge Carolyn J. Thompson in Durham County on motions Mangum filed against the Durham County Police Department, the Durham County District Attorney's Office and Police Officer Marianne Bond for malicious prosecution related to 2011 larceny charges. When arrested in 2011, Mangum was in possession of two money orders from Daye. Mangum stated that the money orders were given to her by Daye to pay rent and that Daye, prior to his death, had confirmed this to Bond. However, Bond and the DA's Office sought to charge Mangum with two counts of larceny, one for each money order. Judge Thompson dismissed the motion due to the expiration of the three year statute of limitations. Mangum has not been convicted of the larceny charges..

As of August 2018, Mangum was held at Neuse Correctional Institution in Goldsboro, North Carolina.

According to the North Carolina Department of Public Safety, Mangum served 12 years and 3 months in prison and was released on Friday, February 27, 2026.

== In media ==
A version of the story of Daye's killing was featured in an episode of Wives with Knives, which aired December 12, 2012, during its first season on Investigation Discovery. Mangum appeared in the episode, having given a jailhouse interview to the show's producers in the summer of 2012. The interview focused mostly on the murder and not the Duke lacrosse case. Daye's murder was featured on an episode of Fatal Attraction, called "Toxic Romance", which aired on TV One on August 4, 2014 (Season 2 Episode 23). An episode of Snapped, which aired on October 7, 2018, titled "Crystal Mangum", detailed her story and Daye's murder.

In 2016, ESPN aired an episode of their series 30 for 30, titled "Fantastic Lies", about the Duke lacrosse case.

== See also ==
- Tawana Brawley rape allegations – a similar case of false rape allegations that took place in Wappingers Falls, New York, in 1987

== Sources ==
Taylor, Stuart Jr.; Johnson, K. C. (2007), Until Proven Innocent: Political Correctness and the Shameful Injustices of the Duke Lacrosse Rape Case, Macmillan, ISBN 9780312384869
