= Mike Nifong =

American politician and former attorney (born 1950)

North Carolina District Attorney for Prosecutorial District 14
- In office April 27, 2005 – June 21, 2007
- Preceded by: Jim Hardin
- Succeeded by: Jim Hardin (acting)
- Constituency: Durham County, North Carolina

Personal details
- Born: Michael Byron Nifong; September 14, 1950 (age 76) Wilmington, North Carolina, U.S.
- Party: Democratic
- Spouse: Cy Gurney (m. 1998)
- Children: 2
- Education: University of North Carolina at Chapel Hill; University of North Carolina School of Law
- Known for: Misconduct against falsely accused players in the Duke lacrosse case

Michael Byron Nifong (born September 14, 1950) is a former American attorney who was disbarred after serving as the Durham County District Attorney in North Carolina. He was removed from this position, disbarred, and briefly jailed following court findings concerning his conduct in the Duke lacrosse rape hoax. Among other wrongdoings, he was found to have conspired with the DNA lab director to withhold exculpatory DNA evidence that would have exonerated the defendants.

== Early life ==
Nifong was born and raised in Wilmington, North Carolina, where he attended New Hanover High School. He graduated Phi Beta Kappa from the University of North Carolina at Chapel Hill (UNC) in 1971 with a degree in political science. He registered as a conscientious objector and participated in anti-war protests during the Vietnam War. After working as a teacher and social worker, Nifong returned to UNC in 1975 and earned a J.D. degree from the University of North Carolina School of Law in 1978. He was admitted to the North Carolina bar.

== Career ==
After spending a year as a per diem assistant with the Durham County District Attorney's office, Nifong was hired on a full-time basis in 1979. He eventually worked his way up to chief assistant. Nifong was part of the prosecution team during the Michael Peterson trial in 2003.

After District Attorney Jim Hardin was appointed to a North Carolina Superior Court vacancy in 2005, Governor Mike Easley appointed Nifong to fill out the remainder of Hardin's term. Nifong was sworn in on April 27, 2005. As the Duke lacrosse case unfolded, Nifong won the Democratic primary on May 2, 2006 for Durham County District Attorney. He won the general election in November 2006 by a margin of 833 votes.

== Duke lacrosse case ==
In 2006, Nifong pursued rape, sexual assault, and kidnapping charges against Reade Seligmann, Collin Finnerty, and David Evans, three white members of the Duke University men's lacrosse team. The false accusations of sexual assault were made by Crystal Mangum, one of two local black women hired by the lacrosse team to work as strippers for a party. The case attracted national and international media attention.

Daniel Okrent, former public editor of the New York Times, wrote that the Duke case "conformed too well to too many preconceived notions of too many in the press: white over black, rich over poor, athletes over non-athletes, men over women, educated over non-educated."

In the first weeks of the case, Nifong gave an estimated 50 to 70 interviews. On the day he received his first briefing by police, March 27, 2006, he told the press, "The circumstances of the rape indicated a deep racial motivation for some of the things that were done." By April 1, he had made 48 statements to the press, including assertions that others present at the party where the alleged assault took place were covering for the accused players, saying, "I would like to think that somebody who was not in the bathroom has the human decency to call up and say, 'What am I doing covering up for a bunch of hooligans?'" Initial media reports on the case largely reflected Nifong's statements and opinions.

Nifong said in a court hearing on October 27, six months after the arrest of Seligmann, Finnerty, and Evans, that he had not yet interviewed the alleged victim. "I haven't talked with her about the facts of that night...We're not at that stage yet." According to Nifong, none of his assistants had discussed the case with her, either.

On December 22, 2006, Nifong dropped the rape charge against the men after Mangum changed her story, saying that she was no longer certain whether she was penetrated vaginally by any of the men. This was a few days after it was revealed in court that Nifong had withheld evidence from the defense concerning DNA tests. (The sexual assault and kidnapping charges were still being investigated.) Nifong was strongly criticized for pressing ahead with what appeared to many to be a weak case without any physical evidence. The defense argued that Mangum had given at least a dozen different accounts of the incident, changing the number of attackers from twenty to three, and modifying the methods by which she was assaulted.

In January 2007, Nifong sent a letter to then-North Carolina Attorney General Roy A. Cooper, asking his office to assume responsibility of the case. This came days after Mangum changed her story again, claiming that Seligmann was not involved in the alleged attack. Previously she had accused him and two others of the alleged rape.

The next day, Cooper announced that his office would take over the case. In April, he announced that charges against the three players would be dropped and that, "based on the significant inconsistencies between the evidence and the various accounts given by the accusing witness, we believe these three individuals are innocent of these charges".

In December 2024, Mangum stated in a letter that she had lied about her accusations against Evans, Finnerty, and Seligmann and wanted to publicly apologize for her actions. She further admitted, during a December 11, 2024 podcast interview, that she "made up a story that wasn't true" about the white lacrosse players who attended a party where she was hired to be a stripper.

=== Criticism ===
Defense lawyers and media outlets strongly criticized Nifong's handling of the case. Nifong said that the criticisms were the product of a defense strategy to malign the prosecution and intimidate the alleged rape victim.

As the details of the case emerged, Nifong was attacked not only by advocates of the indicted students but by news sources such as The Washington Post and the Los Angeles Times. They claimed he went public with a series of accusations that later turned out to be untrue; that he exaggerated and intensified racial tensions; that he unduly influenced the Durham police investigation; that he tried to manipulate potential witnesses; that he refused to hear exculpatory evidence before indictment; that regulations on the conduct of an identification exercise were breached by a failure to include "dummy" photographs of anyone who was not at the party; that he had never spoken directly to the alleged victim about the accusations; and that he made misleadingly incomplete presentations of various aspects of the evidence in the case, including DNA results.

Additional coverage critical of the prosecution's case included that expressed by 60 Minutes, the Charlotte Observer, Fox News, the Greensboro News & Record, National Journal, the Newark Star-Ledger, The News & Observer, Newsweek, the New York Daily News, New York magazine, the San Diego Union Tribune, Washington Times, The Star-News (Wilmington, N.C.), and the now-defunct Rocky Mountain News.

In the early days after the suspects were arrested, Nifong gave more than 50 interviews, many with the national media, according to his own account and confirmed by the News & Observer. In these interviews, Nifong repeatedly said that he was "confident" that a rape occurred, calling the players "a bunch of hooligans" whose "daddies could buy them expensive lawyers." From early April 2006, however, Nifong generally refused to talk to the media.

On July 18, 2006, defense lawyers charged that Nifong made "unprofessional and discourteous" remarks. During a preliminary hearing, Nifong said, "[Defense] attorneys were almost disappointed that their clients didn't get indicted so they could be a part of this spectacle here in Durham." One lawyer asserted that "Nifong's statement is an insult to the legal profession as a whole and is certainly unwarranted by any facts in this case." Others saw it as a personal insult. Nifong went on vacation and could not be reached for further comment.

On October 27, 2006, Nifong said in court that neither he nor his assistants had yet discussed the alleged assault with the accuser, saying they had so far left that aspect of the investigation to the police.

Critics of the district attorney requested that Nifong be investigated, punished and disbarred for his actions in this case. On December 12, 2006, Republican Representative Walter B. Jones of North Carolina's 3rd district was reported to have sent a letter to U.S. Attorney General Alberto Gonzales asking for an investigation into whether Nifong committed prosecutorial misconduct and violated the civil rights of the three suspects in the case; Gonzales stated that his office might investigate how Nifong had handled the case.

Critics noted that police had been instructed to "Go through Mr. Nifong for any directions as to how to conduct matters in this case." This was an unusual action for a prosecutor to order.

On December 16, 2006, media reported that Nifong and DNA lab director Brian Meehan had conspired to withhold exculpatory DNA evidence from the final report submitted to the defense team.

The prosecution of the case was criticized by the legal analyst for the National Journal, Stuart Taylor, as well as New York Times columnists David Brooks and Nicholas Kristof.

An investigation by CBS's 60 Minutes "reveal[ed] disturbing facts about the conduct of the police and the district attorney, and raise[d] serious concerns." This 60 Minutes segment was honored with a Peabody Award on April 4, 2007.

Several writers at Slate criticized the prosecution's actions. They especially criticized the mainstream media for accepting prosecution claims at face value in spite of countervailing evidence.

Because Nifong failed to turn over exculpatory evidence to defense lawyers on December 22, 2006, The News & Observer wrote that "to press forward in the [...] case, District Attorney Mike Nifong must rely on scanty evidence while deflecting serious questions about whether he broke the law or violated the ethics rules governing prosecutors."

Columnist Thomas Sowell accused Nifong of using the case to improve his chances in the next election by gaining large support from the African-American community.

Nifong won the primary and general election for district attorney, which took place in the midst of the case, although allegations against him of ethical improprieties had already come to light.

In 2011 a federal judge ruled that a civil lawsuit could proceed against Nifong, including claims of malicious prosecution and fabrication of false evidence in the Duke lacrosse case.

== Ethics charges ==
On December 28, 2006, the North Carolina State Bar filed ethics charges against Nifong over his conduct in the case, accusing him of making public statements "prejudicial to the administration of justice" and of engaging in "conduct involving dishonesty, fraud, deceit, or misrepresentation." The seventeen-page document accused Nifong of violating four rules of professional conduct, listing more than fifty examples of statements he made to the media.

The State Bar filed a second round of ethics charges on January 24, 2007. In this document, it accused Nifong of a "systematic abuse of prosecutorial discretion ... prejudicial to the administration of justice" when he withheld DNA evidence to mislead the court.

Nifong's lawyers filed a report asking for dismissal of some of the charges against him on March 19, arguing that his actions had not prevented the defendants from a fair trial since defense attorneys received a DNA report before a trial date was set. The State Bar denied the request, pointing out that North Carolina law "is unambiguous: Anyone subject to an NTO [Nontestimonial Identification Order] must be given any report of test results as soon as such a report is available." The Bar continued that "Nifong is effectively arguing that he can make false statements to a court which result in the entry of an order, and then use the order that is based on his misrepresentations to claim he committed no discovery violation."

At an April 13 hearing, another request for dismissal of the charges was denied. Nifong's team argued that the law about revealing exculpatory evidence to the defense was too vague about a timetable. Attorneys for the State Bar pointed out that it was only through diligent efforts of the Duke players' defense team that the DNA report was finally made available to them. The formal ethics hearing began on June 12 in Raleigh.

On June 15, Nifong took the stand to testify in his own defense. During the testimony, he apologized to the families of the Duke athletes and stated that he would resign as district attorney. Joseph Cheshire, attorney for David Evans, one of the accused players, dismissed the apology as "a cynical political attempt to save his law license". During the trial, Nifong acknowledged he knew there was no DNA evidence connecting Reade Seligmann and Collin Finnerty to the accuser.

== Disbarment ==
On June 16, 2007, the North Carolina State Bar Disciplinary Committee unanimously voted to disbar Nifong after delivering a guilty verdict to 27 of 32 charges. The committee found Nifong's previous disciplinary record and acknowledgment of his improper pre-trial statements were substantially outweighed by (among other things) the players' vulnerability and his failure to acknowledge the "wrongful nature of (his) conduct with respect of the handling of DNA evidence."

Committee chair Lane Williamson called the case a "fiasco" and said Nifong's actions involved "dishonesty, fraud, deceit and misrepresentation." Williamson further stated, "At the time he was facing a primary, and yes, he was politically naive, but we can draw no other conclusion that those initial statements he made were to further his political ambitions." In the end, the panel concluded that "there is no discipline short of disbarment appropriate in this case given the magnitude of the offenses found."

Nifong agreed to surrender his law license and said he would not appeal; through his attorney, he said that disbarment was an appropriate punishment. Nifong was the first sitting district attorney in the history of North Carolina to be disbarred. Earlier in the day, Nifong offered to voluntarily surrender his law license. However, Williamson said that the panel had to issue a ruling, and issued its disbarment order shortly thereafter. Under North Carolina law, the order took effect 30 days after Nifong received it in writing.

Immediately after the hearing, lawyers for the three players said they would seek to have Nifong held in criminal contempt of court for his false statements. The lawyers added that calls for a federal civil rights investigation into the matter were not out of line. The players' attorneys called for an independent investigation into the case, and as of June 2007 Cooper was considering whether to open a criminal probe into the affair.

The players' attorneys said on June 18 that their clients were very likely to file a civil suit against Nifong to recover their legal expenses and restore their reputations. It is not known how much they can recover; Nifong had no income aside from his salary as DA, and public records indicate that he has no significant assets other than his home in Durham, real estate in western North Carolina and retirement accounts. According to The News and Observer, the players incurred $3 million in legal costs.

On June 18, Nifong submitted his resignation to Governor Easley and Durham County Chief Superior Court Judge Orlando Hudson, saying he would leave office on July 13. Hudson said that Nifong should have resigned immediately, saying that defense attorneys could challenge Nifong's authority. Easley, a former prosecutor and state attorney general, also felt that Nifong should have resigned immediately.

Early on June 19, Hudson issued an order suspending Nifong from office with pay. Under North Carolina law, this was the first step in a process that allows the chief judge of a county to remove that county's district attorney from office. Hudson also appointed a Raleigh attorney as special prosecutor to oversee the removal proceeding. A Durham resident, Beth Brewer, had asked Hudson to remove Nifong in February on the grounds that Nifong engaged in willful misconduct and brought disrepute upon his office – two of the criteria required for removing a district attorney from office. This process had been used only once before, when Jerry Spivey, the district attorney for New Hanover and Pender counties, was removed from office in 1995 for using a racial slur. In April 2021, the statute was used a third time to remove DA Greg Newman from office.

On June 20, Nifong began talks with the special prosecutor about the possibility of leaving office immediately, but later that day, Easley appointed Jim Hardin, Nifong's predecessor, as acting district attorney. This came hours after Easley signed a bill that would allow the governor to remove a district attorney or judge from office if he or she has been disbarred or suspended from practicing law. Easley strongly supported the bill, which unanimously passed both houses of the legislature.

Easley had let it be known that he would have removed Nifong from office immediately if he had had the authority and power to do so. It had been unclear how soon Easley could have removed Nifong under the new law. The bill does not allow a governor to remove a DA or judge until the State Bar formally issued its order of disbarment and all appeals have been exhausted. However, Nifong had said he would not appeal. Hardin was sworn in the next day, and served until September 2007, when Easley appointed Assistant District Attorney David Saacks to fill out the first half of Nifong's term. At the time of Hardin's swearing-in, negotiations were still under way between Nifong and the special prosecutor, and Hudson was proceeding with the hearing to remove him for good. However, according to a spokesman for the state's Administrative Office of the Courts, Nifong's tenure as DA ended with Hardin's swearing-in. Nifong formally resigned from office on July 2.

Nifong's former assistant district attorney, Tracey Cline, was elected District Attorney in a 2008 special election and re-elected in 2010. She was removed from office herself in 2012 for, among other things, making defamatory accusations against Judge Hudson. Her license to practice law was suspended for five years in 2015 but she was not disbarred.

On June 22, the players' lawyers filed their motion asking Superior Court Judge Osmond Smith, who presided over the case, to hold Nifong in contempt. The players also wanted Nifong to pay for the 60 to 100 hours it took to prove that he misrepresented the DNA evidence. Nifong was charged with having violated at least a dozen laws, rules and court orders designed to protect defendants' rights by playing "a game of hide and seek" with evidence that could have cleared the players. The players' motion also alleged that Nifong's misconduct "shocks the conscience and defies any notion of accident or negligence". Earlier that same month, Judge Smith had filed papers stating that he retained control over the case although the charges had been dismissed and had the power to impose his own sanctions against Nifong.

On July 25, Nifong issued a less qualified apology for his actions, saying he did not challenge Cooper's conclusion that there was "no credible evidence" to support the charges he had made. While the players' attorneys expressed skepticism about his sincerity, they did withdraw their demands that he pay for the legal work it took to uncover the DNA evidence.

In a letter addressed to the North Carolina State Bar on August 7, Nifong formally surrendered his law license. He then decried the "fundamental unfairness" with which his disbarment was conducted, contradicting his own lawyer's assertion that Nifong believed disbarment to be an appropriate punishment. To explain the physical condition of the license, Nifong said the license had been damaged "by a puppy in her chewing stage", and therefore had never been framed or displayed.

== Sentence and jail ==
On September 7, 2007, after having already been disbarred, Nifong reported to the Durham County jail to serve a one-day jail sentence for contempt of court. He was held alone in a cell for his protection.

== Sued by players ==
On October 5, 2007, Evans, Finnerty, and Seligmann filed a federal lawsuit alleging that Nifong engineered a wide-ranging conspiracy to frame the players. Also named in the suit were the lab that handled the DNA work, the city of Durham, the city's former police chief, the deputy police chief, the two police detectives who handled the case and five other police department employees. The players sought unspecified damages, and wanted to place the Durham Police Department under court supervision for 10 years, claiming the actions of the police department pose "a substantial risk of irreparable injury to other persons in the City of Durham." According to the suit, Nifong's sole motive was to win support for his reelection bid; the suit alleges that Nifong told his campaign manager that the case would provide "'millions of dollars' in free advertising." This allegation is confirmed by The New York Times, and by an interview with Nifong's campaign manager. Nifong asked the state attorney general's office and the Administrative Office of the Courts to pay his legal fees and help defend him, but both offices refused on the grounds that Nifong's actions involved "fraud, corruption (and) malice." A settlement was reached in 2014 in which Nifong made a $1,000 donation and the city of Durham made a $50,000 donation to the North Carolina Innocence Inquiry Commission.

== Bankruptcy filing ==
On January 15, 2008, Nifong filed for bankruptcy under Chapter 7 of the Bankruptcy Code. He listed assets of almost $244,000 and liabilities of over $180.3 million, virtually all of which derived from six $30 million "unsecured nonpriority claims", one for each of the six members of the 2005–06 Duke lacrosse team suing Nifong, among others.

While the bankruptcy filing automatically delayed the civil suit against him, it may not protect Nifong from civil liability for his actions in the case. Unsecured creditors can still pursue claims against someone filing for bankruptcy if the debt was incurred through "willful and malicious injury" to them. Seligmann's attorney, noted Triangle lawyer David Rudolf, said that the players intend to pursue such a claim.

According to at least one bankruptcy law expert, Nifong's bankruptcy filing was a tacit admission that he does not have the resources to defend himself against the players' civil suit, and is trying to protect what assets he is allowed to protect under the law. On March 11, 2008, the Bankruptcy Administrator recommended that Nifong's Chapter 7 bankruptcy case be dismissed or converted to a Chapter 13 bankruptcy case because Nifong earned income above the requirement set forth in the means test to be eligible to file a Chapter 7 bankruptcy case. However, the Bankruptcy Court ultimately held that Nifong was eligible to be a debtor in a Chapter 7 bankruptcy case and granted him a bankruptcy discharge on June 4, 2008. Later that same year, Judge William L. Stocks lifted the automatic stay imposed by Nifong's bankruptcy filing and announced that the plaintiffs could pursue their lawsuit.

== Later developments ==
In July 2014 there was a call for all the cases Nifong had prosecuted to be reviewed on the basis of his having been shown to ignore due process in some cases including the murder trial against Darryl Howard, who had been convicted in 1995 of a 1991 murder of a woman and her daughter.

In 2014, Howard, who at that time had been imprisoned for murder for 20 years, was granted a new trial because Nifong had withheld evidence in the trial that led to his convictions. Two years later, following a hearing where the state was asked why the convictions should stand, his murder conviction was vacated and Howard was released from prison, noting that DNA evidence not presented to the jury would likely have exonerated him.

== Personal life ==
Nifong is twice married. His second wife is Cy Gurney, regional administrator of North Carolina Guardian ad Litem. He has a daughter from his first marriage and a son with Gurney. He lives in northern Durham County.
