= Duke lacrosse rape hoax =

2006 criminal case in Durham, North Carolina, United States

Coordinates: 36°00′30″N 78°54′43″W

The Duke lacrosse rape hoax was a widely reported 2006 criminal case and racial scam in Durham, North Carolina, United States, in which three members of the Duke University men's lacrosse team were falsely accused of rape. The three students were David Evans, Collin Finnerty, and Reade Seligmann. The accuser, Crystal Mangum, a student at North Carolina Central University and part-time striptease dancer, alleged that the rape occurred at the Durham residence of two of the team's captains, where she had worked on March 13, 2006. Investigation and resolution of the case sparked public discussion of racism, sexual violence, media bias, and due process on campuses. The former lead prosecutor, Durham County district attorney Mike Nifong, ultimately resigned in disgrace and was disbarred and briefly imprisoned for violating ethics standards. It was not until December 2024, 18 years after the events that Mangum admitted she had lied.

On April 11, 2007, North Carolina attorney general Roy Cooper dropped all charges, declaring the three lacrosse players "innocent" and victims of a "tragic rush to accuse". Cooper described Nifong as a "rogue prosecutor"; he withdrew from the case in January 2007 after the North Carolina State Bar filed ethics charges against him. In June 2007, Nifong was disbarred for "dishonesty, fraud, deceit and misrepresentation", making him the first prosecutor in North Carolina disbarred for trial conduct. Nifong served one day in jail for lying about sharing DNA tests (criminal contempt); he had not given results to the defense team. The lab director said it was a misunderstanding and Nifong claimed it was due to weak memory. DNA analysis did not show evidence from any of the accused men; Mangum was not charged for her false allegations.

Cooper noted several inconsistencies between Mangum's accounts of the evening and the alibis offered by Seligmann and Finnerty, which were supported by forensic evidence. The Durham Police Department was strongly criticized for violating their own policies by allowing Nifong to act as the de facto head of the investigation; using an unreliable suspect-only photo identification procedure with Mangum; pursuing the case despite vast discrepancies in notes taken by Investigator Benjamin Himan and Sergeant Mark Gottlieb; and distributing a poster that appeared to presume the suspects' guilt shortly after the allegations were made public. The three students brought a civil lawsuit against Duke University, which was settled with the university paying approximately US$20 million to each claimant. The students also sought further unspecified damages and called for criminal justice reform laws in a federal civil rights lawsuit filed against the City of Durham and its police department.

== Timeline of events ==
=== Events at the house ===
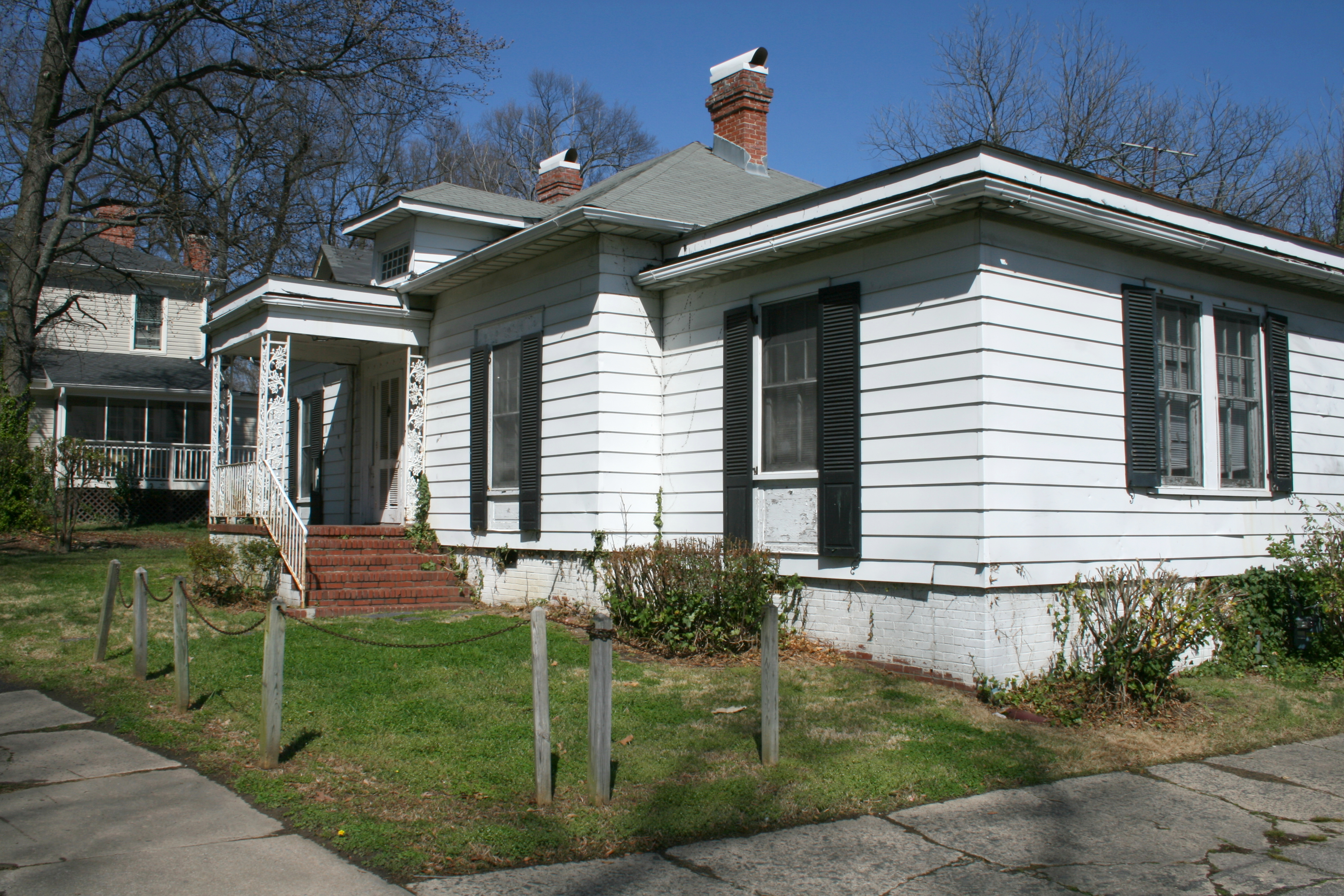
The house at 610 North Buchanan Boulevard (demolished in July 2010)

In March 2006, Crystal Mangum, a student at North Carolina Central University, had been working part-time as a stripper. Although Mangum claimed that she had only recently taken up stripping, further investigating revealed that she had worked at strip clubs since at least 2002, during which time she was arrested for attempting to run over a police officer in a taxi she had stolen. The incident report stated that she had been lap dancing at a strip club that evening.

On March 13, 2006, the lacrosse team held a party at 610 North Buchanan Boulevard, a house owned by Duke University and used as the off-campus residence of the lacrosse team's captains. The team intended for the party to be compensation for having to remain on campus during spring break, due to their competition schedule, and alcohol was consumed. Several players were unaware that strippers had been hired, and only after their arrival were they asked to contribute to the strippers' fees.

A team captain contacted Allure, an escort service, and requested two white strippers. However, the two women who had arrived, Mangum and Kim Mera Roberts (aka Kim Mera Pittman), were black and biracial (half-black/half-Asian), respectively. Before arriving at the party, Mangum, by her own admission, had consumed alcohol and Flexeril (a prescription muscle relaxant). Mangum and Roberts traveled to the party separately. Roberts drove herself and arrived first, and Mangum was later dropped off by a man.

According to the team captains, while the strippers were dancing, a player asked if the women had any sex toys. Roberts responded by asking if the player's penis was too small. The player brandished a broomstick and suggested that she "use this [as a sex toy]". At this exchange, the women stopped their performance, and left the living room, shutting themselves in the main bathroom of the house. While the women were still in the bathroom, players Seligmann and Finnerty left the house. When the women eventually came out, Mangum began roaming around the yard, half-dressed and shouting.

According to Mangum, the women were coaxed back into the house with an apology, at which point they were separated. She later asserted that she was dragged into a bathroom and raped, beaten, and choked for a half hour. Later, police received a 9-1-1 call from a woman complaining that white men had gathered outside of the house where the party took place, had called her racial slurs, and threatened to sodomize her with a broomstick.

Some of the party attendees expressed displeasure that the strippers had delivered a very short performance, despite being paid several hundred dollars apiece to perform. The team captain who had hired the strippers tried to convince the women to go back inside and complete the performance. Both women returned inside, but upon being approached by the player who had earlier brandished the broomstick, again refused to perform, and once again locked themselves in the bathroom. By this point, a number of the party guests had left. House residents, including Evans, asked the remaining guests to leave because they were concerned that the noise would cause neighbors to complain to police. When the strippers left the bathroom, and the house, for the second time, a resident locked the door so they (and the guests who had left the house) could not return.

Around 1:00 a.m., while attempting to leave the party, Mangum and Roberts called the partygoers "short dick white boys", and jeered about "how he couldn't get it on his own and had to pay for it". One player responded, "We asked for whites, not niggers." Mangum and Roberts departed in Roberts's car. Roberts called 9-1-1 and reported that she had just come from 610 North Buchanan, and a "white guy" had yelled "nigger" at her from near the East Campus wall. The party ended shortly thereafter and everyone, including the residents, left the house. Police returned to the house later, as a result of Roberts' complaint, but did not receive an answer at the door; a neighbor confirmed that an earlier party had ended.

=== After departure ===
As Roberts drove away with Mangum, the two women began to argue. Roberts stopped the car and attempted to push Mangum out. When that failed, Roberts drove Mangum to a nearby Kroger supermarket, went inside, and told a female security guard that a woman was refusing to leave her car. The guard walked to the car and asked Mangum to leave, but Mangum remained in the vehicle. The guard later said she had not smelled alcohol on Mangum's breath, but thought she might have been under the influence of other drugs. At 1:22 a.m., the guard called 9-1-1 to report that Mangum was refusing to leave a vehicle that did not belong to her. Police arrived, removed Mangum from the car, and questioned her.

Mangum was transferred to Duke University Medical Center. Examination of her skin, arms, and legs revealed no swelling, no abnormalities, and three small cuts on her right knee and right heel. When asked, she specifically, and repeatedly, denied receiving any physical blows by hands. Further examination showed no tenderness in the back, chest, and neck. There was, however, diffuse swelling of her vagina. Mangum later claimed that she had performed using a vibrator, for a couple in a hotel room, shortly before the lacrosse team party. This activity, or a yeast infection, could have caused the swelling. Investigators did not note any other injuries in the rest of the report.

=== McFadyen e-mail ===
A couple of hours after the party ended, Ryan McFadyen, a member of the lacrosse team, sent an e-mail to other players saying that he planned to have some strippers over, kill them, and cut off their skin while wearing his Duke-issue spandex and ejaculating.

The e-mail began:

To whom it may concern, tomorrow night, after tonights show, ive decided to have some strippers over to edens 2c. all are welcome.. however there will be no nudity. I plan on killing the bitches as soon as the[y] walk in and proceding [sic] to cut their skin off while cumming in my duke issue spandex . . all in besides arch and tack [two of his teammates] please respond

Some of the players suggested the e-mail was intended as humorous irony. Administrators asserted the e-mail was in imitation of Patrick Bateman, the protagonist in the Bret Easton Ellis novel American Psycho, which was read and lectured upon in more than one Duke class, as evidenced by the e-mail responses from other players. One wrote, "I'll bring the Phil Collins," a reference to the American Psycho book and film. Police released the McFadyen e-mail but refused to release the following e-mail exchanges, leaving the impression that the McFadyen e-mail was intended as a serious threat. McFadyen thereafter received a thousand death threats in one week.

The e-mail led many people to assume guilt on the part of the players. McFadyen was not charged with any crime, but he was temporarily suspended from Duke, with the university citing safety concerns. He was invited back to Duke to continue his studies later that summer.

== Investigation and prosecution ==
=== Arrests and investigation timeline ===
On March 14, 2006, the day after the party, the Durham Police Department (DPD) began their investigation into the rape allegations by interviewing Mangum and searching 610 North Buchanan pursuant to a warrant. The three team captains who lived at the house, including Evans, voluntarily gave statements and DNA samples to police and offered to take lie detector tests. The police turned down the offer.

The DPD made their investigation public on March 15, when Sgt. Mark Gottlieb, the police supervisor, posted on a digital community bulletin board that they were investigating the rape of a young woman by three males at 610 North Buchanan on March 13, and asking anyone in the area who saw or heard anything unusual to contact Investigator Benjamin Himan.

Between March 16 and 21, police showed Mangum photo arrays in an attempt to have her identify her attackers. Each photo array contained photographs only of lacrosse team members. This did not follow the DPD's recommended policy of including photos of individuals not regarded as potential suspects (known as "fillers"). Mangum identified Seligmann as someone who attended the party, but not as an attacker, and did not identify Evans at all despite seeing his photo twice.

On March 27, Durham County District Attorney Mike Nifong received his first briefing on the case from Gottlieb and Himan. Within a few hours of receiving the briefing, Nifong made his first public statement on the case. Over the following week, Nifong by his own estimate gave fifty to seventy interviews and devoted more than forty hours to reporters. After that he continued to make statements, albeit less frequently. Many of these statements concerned the team members' alleged failure or refusal to provide information to law enforcement authorities, their invocation of their constitutional rights, or consisted of Nifong's own opinions that a crime had occurred, that it was racially motivated, and that one or more lacrosse players were guilty.

Mangum was shown another photo array containing only photos of the 46 white lacrosse team members, including members who had not attended the party. There were no fillers included. The photos were shown to Mangum as a PowerPoint presentation, with each photo projected individually to her, rather than the pictures being arrayed together. For the first time, Mangum identified photos of Seligmann, Evans, and Finnerty as her attackers. She also identified at least one other photo as being a player who was present at the party; further investigation showed he had not been there.

On April 10, an attorney retained by one of the lacrosse players stated that time-stamped photographs existed which showed that Mangum was already injured when she arrived at the party, and was visibly impaired. Players' attorneys announced that DNA testing by the North Carolina state crime lab had failed to connect any members of the Duke men's lacrosse team to the alleged rape.

Seligmann and Finnerty were arrested and indicted on April 18 on charges of first degree forcible rape, first degree sexual offense and kidnapping. The same day, search warrants were executed on Finnerty and Seligmann's dorm rooms. Seligmann reportedly told multiple teammates, "I'm glad they picked me", alluding to his alibi in the form of ATM records, photographs, cell phone records, an affidavit from a taxi driver, and a record of his DukeCard being swiped at his dorm.

DNA Security Inc. (DSI), a private company engaged by Nifong to perform a second round of DNA testing, produced an incomplete report. It contained an analysis of DNA found on false fingernails discarded by Mangum in the bathroom trash bin, and concluded that 2% of the male population, including Evans, could not be excluded from a match with the fingernail DNA. DSI director Brian Meehan later testified that, pursuant to an agreement with Nifong, he had deliberately withheld information from the lab's report.

On May 15, 2006, former team captain and 2006 Duke graduate Evans was also indicted on charges of first-degree forcible rape, sexual offense and kidnapping. Just before turning himself in at the Durham County Detention Center, he publicly declared his innocence and his expectation of being cleared of the charges within weeks.

Court documents revealed that Roberts, in her initial statement, had said she was with Mangum the entire evening except for a period of less than five minutes. After hearing Mangum claim she was sexually assaulted, Roberts called those claims "a crock".

On December 22, 2006, Nifong dropped the rape charges against all three lacrosse players after Mangum told an investigator a different version of events and said she was no longer sure about some aspects of her original story. The kidnapping and sexual offense charges were still pending against all three players.

On December 28, 2006, the North Carolina bar filed ethics charges against Nifong over his conduct in the case, accusing him of making public statements that were prejudicial to the administration of justice and heightened public condemnation of the accused, and of engaging in conduct involving dishonesty, fraud, deceit, or misrepresentation. The 17-page document accused Nifong of violating four rules of professional conduct, listing more than 100 examples of statements he made to the media.

On January 12, 2007, Nifong sent a letter to North Carolina Attorney General Roy Cooper asking to be taken off the case. The following day, January 13, Cooper announced that his office would take over the case.

On January 24, 2007, the North Carolina State Bar filed a second round of ethics charges against Nifong for a systematic abuse of prosecutorial discretion that was prejudicial to the administration of justice by his withheld DNA evidence to mislead the court.

On March 23, 2007, Justin Paul Caulfield, a legal analyst for the sports magazine Inside Lacrosse, stated on Fox News that the charges against Evans, Finnerty, and Seligmann would soon be dropped. While the North Carolina Attorney General's Office first disputed the report, on April 11, 2007, it announced that it had dismissed all charges against the three lacrosse players.

Cooper also took the unusual step of declaring the accused players innocent. He announced that Mangum would not be prosecuted, stating that investigators and attorneys who had interviewed her thought "she may actually believe the many different stories that she has been telling ... it's in the best interest of justice not to bring charges".

On April 12, 2007, the attorney general, in declaring Seligmann, Finnerty, and Evans innocent, described Nifong as a "rogue prosecutor".

=== DNA tests ===
Shortly after the party, the prosecution ordered 46 of the 47 lacrosse team members to provide DNA samples, although some members had not attended the event. The sole black member of the team was exempt because Mangum had stated that her attackers were white. On April 10, 2006, the district attorney announced that DNA testing by the state crime lab did not connect any of the 46 tested team members to the alleged rape.

After the initial tests by the state crime lab, prosecutor Nifong sought the services of a private laboratory, DNA Security, Inc. (aka DSI), of Burlington, North Carolina, to conduct additional tests. DNA from multiple unidentified males had been found in forensic evidence from Mangum and upon the rape kit items that had been tested, but none matched any of the lacrosse players. Nifong falsely represented to the court and the public that DNA had been found only from a single male source, Mangum's boyfriend.

In a motion made on December 15, 2006, defense attorneys argued that the DNA analysis report written by DSI and provided to them by Nifong's office was incomplete, because it omitted information showing that none of the genetic material from several men found on Mangum matched any DNA sample from the lacrosse team. Brian Meehan, the director of DSI who wrote the misleading report, testified that his lab did not try to withhold information, but acknowledged that the decision not to release the full report violated the lab's policies. Meehan testified that after discussions with Nifong, he decided to withhold the names of the persons excluded by the DNA testing (all 46 tested members of the lacrosse team) to protect the privacy of players not implicated in the case. But two players (Seligmann and Finnerty) had already been indicted for rape more than three weeks prior to the release date of the report. Meehan was later fired in October 2007 based on his actions in this case.

DNA was also taken from all surfaces of three of Mangum's false fingernails retrieved from the trash in the party house bathroom (widely but inaccurately reported as DNA taken only from the "underside" of a single fingernail). According to DNA Security, the fingernail DNA showed some characteristics similar to Evans's DNA. However, the match was not conclusive, as 2% of the male population (including Evans) could not be excluded based on the sample. In addition, because Evans lived in the house, defense attorneys contended that any DNA present might have come from the tissue paper, cotton swabs, or other hygiene-related trash that had been in the garbage can along with the fingernail. This was confirmed later by Attorney General Cooper's investigation: "to the extent that Evans's DNA could not be excluded, the SBI experts confirmed that the DNA could easily have been transferred to the fingernails from other materials in the trash can".

Nifong contended that lack of DNA evidence is not unusual and that 75–80% of all sexual assault cases lack DNA evidence. Rape victims often delay reporting by days or weeks, inadvertently destroying DNA evidence. However, in this case, Mangum had a rape-kit exam administered only hours after the end of the party, so experts believed that it was unlikely that there ever had been DNA evidence implicating any player.

Nifong was tried for ethics violations on June 14, 2007. That day, the complete DNA findings were revealed during defense attorney Brad Bannon's testimony. According to conservative estimates, the lab had discovered at least two unidentified males' DNA in Mangum's pubic region; at least two unidentified males' DNA in her rectum; at least four to five unidentified males' DNA on her underpants; and at least one identified male's DNA in her vagina.

=== Finnerty previous incident ===
In November 2005, Finnerty and two of his Chaminade High School lacrosse teammates were charged with misdemeanor simple assault in Washington, D.C., following an altercation with a Washington man outside a Georgetown bar. Finnerty was accused of threatening and taunting the man.

Although the man alleged that Finnerty had pushed and threatened him, the man was punched by a third party (a friend of Finnerty), who admitted to the punch. Witnesses later testified that Finnerty had been hit in the head by a friend of the alleged victim. Although the man alleged that Finnerty and his companions had called him "gay" (among other derogatory names), the incident was not prosecuted as a hate crime. Finnerty was initially accepted into a diversion program for first offenders, allowing for the simple assault charge to be dismissed upon his completion of community service.

But, after Finnerty was charged in Durham, the Washington, D.C. prosecutor cancelled his diversion agreement and proceeded to trial on the assault charge.

Finnerty was convicted and sentenced to six months' probation. Afterward, he was repeatedly threatened by Judge John H. Bayly, Jr., with confinement – once after an anonymous blog post falsely accused him of violating an order that prohibited him from being in Georgetown; and again after he was absent from home and missed an obligatory curfew in order to be in Durham to work on his defense there. However, he had cleared this absence with the judge. According to R. B. Parrish, this treatment was similar to attempts by the government to pressure witnesses to testify in a certain manner. On December 28, 2006, shortly after the Durham rape charges against Finnerty were dropped, Judge Bayly ended Finnerty's probation.

In January 2007, Finnerty's assault conviction was vacated by an order signed by Bayly and his record was cleared.

== Investigative and prosecutorial irregularities ==
=== Credibility of Crystal Mangum as accuser ===
==== Possible intoxication and mental state ====
Lawyers for the Duke lacrosse players have said that Mangum was intoxicated with alcohol and possibly other drugs on the night of the party. By the accuser's own admission to police, she had taken prescription Flexeril and drunk "one or two large-size beers" before she went to the party.

The Attorney General's office later noted that Mangum had taken Ambien, methadone, Paxil, and amitriptyline, although when she began taking these medications is uncertain. She had a long history of mental problems and reportedly was diagnosed with bipolar disorder.

==== Inconsistencies in Mangum's story ====
Over the course of the scandal, police reports, media investigations, and defense attorneys' motions and press conferences brought to light several key inconsistencies in Mangum's story.

Some of the questions about her credibility were:

- Durham police said that Mangum kept changing her story and was not credible, reporting that she initially told them she was raped by 20 white men, later reducing the number to three.
- Another police report states that Mangum initially claimed she was groped, rather than raped, but changed her story before going to the hospital.
- On December 22, 2006, Nifong dropped the rape charges after Mangum stated that she was penetrated from behind but that she did not know with what. In North Carolina, penetration with an object is considered sexual assault, not rape.
- On January 11, 2007, several more inconsistencies came to light after the defense filed a motion detailing her interview on December 21, 2006. For example, she changed details about when she was attacked, who attacked her, and how they attacked her:
  - In the new version from the December 21 interview, Mangum claims she was attacked from 11:35 p.m. to midnight, much earlier than her previous accusations. This new timing was before the well-documented alibi evidence for Seligmann that placed him away from the house. However, the defense said that during this new timing, Seligmann was shown to be on the phone with his girlfriend during the height of the attack. Additionally, Mangum received an incoming call at 11:36 p.m. and somebody stayed on the line for 3 minutes, which would be during the party, according to the new timetable.
  - The new statement contradicted time-stamped photos that show Mangum dancing between 12:00 and 12:04 a.m. If the revised statement time was true, it would mean that the two women stayed at the party for nearly an hour after the supposed attack. Kim Roberts left with Mangum at 12:53 a.m. In her April statement, Mangum said they left immediately after the attack.
  - Mangum changed the names of her attackers, claiming they had used multiple pseudonyms.
  - She also changed her description of Evans. She previously said that she was attacked by a man who looked like Evans with the addition of a mustache. Later she said this assailant had a five o'clock shadow.
  - Mangum claimed that Evans stood in front of her, making her perform oral sex on him. Previously, she stated that Seligmann did this. In the latest statement, she said that Seligmann did not commit any sex act with her, and that he had said that he could not participate because he was getting married. Although he has a girlfriend, there is no evidence that they were engaged or planning marriage.
- North Carolina Attorney General Roy Cooper said Mangum told many different accounts of the attack. In one account, she claimed she was suspended in mid-air and was being assaulted by all three of them in the bathroom. Cooper said this event seemed very implausible because of the small size of the bathroom. According to a 60 Minutes investigation, Mangum gave at least a dozen different stories.
- The News & Observer, North Carolina's second largest newspaper, conducted its own investigation. It determined that Mangum gave at least five different versions of the incident to police and medical interviewers by August 2006.
- At one point, Mangum said that both Evans and Finnerty helped her into her car upon departure. However, a photo shows her being helped by another player. Electronic records and witnesses reported that Evans and Finnerty had already left before she did. Upon seeing the photo, Mangum claimed that it must have been doctored or that Duke University paid someone off.
- Mangum did not consistently identify the same three defendants in the photo lineups. Media reports have disclosed at least two photo lineups that occurred in March and April in which she was asked to recall who she saw at the party and in what capacity. In the March lineup, she did not choose Evans at all. During these two sessions, she identified only Brad Ross with 100% certainty as being at the party.

==== Other credibility issues ====
The Duke defense lawyers or media reports have indicated:

- The second stripper who performed at the house, Kim Roberts, said that Mangum was not raped. She stated that Mangum was not obviously hurt. Likewise, she refuted other aspects of Mangum's story including denying that she helped dress Mangum after the party and saying that they were not forcefully separated by players as Mangum had reported.
- DNA results revealed that Mangum had sex with a man who was not a Duke lacrosse player. Attorney Joseph Cheshire said the tests indicated DNA from a single male source came from a vaginal swab. Media outlets reported that this DNA was from her boyfriend. However, it was later revealed that DNA from multiple males who were neither the lacrosse players nor Mangum's boyfriend had been found, but that these findings had been deliberately withheld from the Court and the defense.
- She had made a similar claim in the past which she did not pursue. On August 18, 1996, the dancer – then 18 years old – told a police officer in Creedmoor she had been raped by three men in June 1993, according to a police document. The officer who took the woman's report at that time asked her to write a detailed timeline of the night's events and bring the account back to the police, but she never returned.
- The strip club's security officer said that Mangum told co-workers four days after the party that she was going to get money from some boys at a Duke party who had not paid her, mentioning that the boys were white. The security guard did not make a big deal of it because he felt that no one took her seriously.
- Mangum was arrested in 2002 for stealing a cab from a strip club where she had been working. She led police officers on a high-speed chase before she was apprehended, at which point her blood alcohol level was more than twice the legal limit. She was sentenced to three weekends in detention.

=== Durham Police Department's actions ===
Lawyers and media have questioned the methods of the photo identification process, and have argued that the police supervisor in the case, Sgt. Mark Gottlieb, has unfairly targeted Duke students in the past.

==== Photo identification ====
Lawyers and media reports alike suggested the photo identification process was severely flawed. During the photo identifications, Mangum was told that she would be viewing Duke University lacrosse players who attended the party, and was asked if she remembered seeing them at the party and in what capacity. Defense attorneys claimed this was essentially a "multiple-choice test in which there were no wrong answers", while Duke law professor James Earl Coleman Jr. posits that "[t]he officer was telling the witness that all are suspects, and say, in effect, 'Pick three.' It's so wrong."

U.S. Department of Justice guidelines suggest including at least five non-suspect filler photos for each suspect included, as did the Durham Police Department's own General Order 4077, adopted in February 2006.

Ross (the only player she identified as attending the party with 100% certainty during both procedures) provided police investigators with evidence that he was with his girlfriend at North Carolina State University before, during, and after the party through cell phone records and an affidavit from a witness. Another person whom the accuser had identified in April also provided police with evidence that he did not attend the party at all. In regards to Seligmann's identification, Mangum's confidence increased from 70% in March to 100% in April. Gary Wells—an Iowa State University professor and expert on police identification procedures—has asserted that memory does not improve with time.

According to the transcript of the photo identification released on The Abrams Report, Mangum also stated that David Evans had a mustache on the night of the attack. Evans's lawyer stated that his client has never had a mustache and that photos as well as eyewitness testimony would reveal that Evans has never had a mustache.

==== Accusations of intimidation tactics ====
Defense lawyers suggested police used intimidation tactics on witnesses. On May 11, Moezeldin Elmostafa, an immigrant taxi driver who signed a sworn statement about Seligmann's whereabouts that defense lawyers say provides a solid alibi, was arrested on a 2½-year-old shoplifting charge. Arresting officers first asked if he had anything new to say about the lacrosse case. When he refused to alter his testimony, he was taken into custody. An arrest and conviction would have destroyed his chance for citizenship and could have led to his deportation. Elmostafa was subsequently tried on the shoplifting charge and acquitted, after a grainy security tape proved that a security guard who was the prosecution's chief witness had "misremembered" events.

Police also arrested Mangum's former husband, Kenneth McNeil; her boyfriend, Matthew Murchison; and another friend, with the disposition of their own separate cases entirely in the hands of District Attorney Nifong. The daughter of Durham's police chief was arrested on an old warrant, and the chief himself remained absent from duty and invisible to the press for most of the case.

==== Supervisor ====
The News & Observer suggested that the supervisor of the lacrosse investigation, Sgt. Mark Gottlieb, had unfairly targeted Duke students in the past, putting some of his investigational tactics into question. Gottlieb made a disproportionate number of arrests of Duke students for misdemeanor violations, such as carrying an open container of alcohol. Normally, these violations earn offenders a pink ticket similar to a traffic ticket.

From May 2005 to February 2006, when Sgt. Gottlieb was a patrol officer in District 2, he made 28 total arrests. Twenty of those arrests were Duke students, and at least 15 were handcuffed and taken to jail. This is in stark contrast to the other two officers on duty in the same district during that same 10-month period. They made 64 total arrests, only two of which were Duke students. Similarly, The News & Observer charges that Gottlieb treated non-students very differently. For example, he wrote up a young man for illegally carrying a concealed .45-caliber handgun and possession of marijuana (crimes far more severe than the Duke students who were taken to jail committed), but did not take him to jail. Residents complimented Gottlieb for dealing fairly with loud parties and disorderly conduct by students.

Duke's student newspaper, The Chronicle, depicted other examples of violence and dishonesty from Sgt. Gottlieb. It published that one student threw a party at his rental home off-East Campus before a Rolling Stones concert in October 2005. The morning after the concert, at 3:00 a.m., Sgt. Gottlieb led a raid on the home with nine other officers while the students were half asleep. It reported that one student was dragged out of bed and then dragged down the stairs, that all seven housemates were put in handcuffs, arrested, and taken into custody for violating a noise ordinance and open container of alcohol violations. Sgt. Gottlieb reportedly told one student, an American citizen of Serbian descent, that he could be deported. Other stories include the throwing of a 130-pound male against his car for an open container of alcohol violation, refusing the ID of a student because he was international, searching through a purse without a warrant, refusing to tell a student her rights, and accusations of perjury.

=== Nifong's actions ===
==== Possible political motivation ====
At the time the rape allegations were made in March 2006, Mike Nifong was in the midst of a difficult Democratic primary election campaign to keep his position as Durham County District Attorney, facing strong opposition. It was understood that if Nifong lost the primary, he would very likely lose his job. Some commentators have opined that Nifong's prosecution of the Duke lacrosse players and his many statements to the media were driven by his political strategy to attract African-American voters. The primary was held on May 6, 2006, and Nifong won by a slim margin of 883 votes. Results showed Nifong won the primary on the basis of strong support from the black community. Nifong went on to win the general election in November 2006, although by a lower margin than usual for Democratic candidates in Durham County at that time.

==== Prosecution's chief investigator ====
Nifong hired Linwood E. Wilson as his chief investigator. During Wilson's private detective career, at least seven formal inquiries into his conduct were performed. In 1997, Wilson was reprimanded by the state commission. After his appeal of the decision was rejected, he allowed his detective license to expire. In response to criticism, Wilson stated that no one had ever questioned his integrity. On June 25, 2007, shortly after Nifong's disbarment and removal from office, it was reported that Nifong's replacement, interim district attorney Jim Hardin Jr., fired Wilson from his post.

== Wider effects ==
=== Effects on Duke faculty and staff ===
Mike Pressler, the coach of the lacrosse team, received threatening e-mails and hate calls, had castigating signs placed on his property, and was the frequent victim of vandalism in the aftermath of the accusations. On April 5, 2006, he resigned (later revealed to have been forced) shortly after the McFadyen e-mail became public. Through his lawyer, he stated that his resignation was not an admission of wrongdoing on his part. On the same day, Richard H. Brodhead, president of Duke University, suspended the remainder of the lacrosse season.

Other Duke faculty members (sometimes referred to as the Group of 88 or the "Gang of 88") have been criticized for their "Social Disaster" letter as well as individual comments and reactions which created a perception of prejudgment.

=== Effect on Duke students ===
Shortly after the party, the University's president warned in a school-wide e-mail of threats of gang violence against Duke students. Other Duke students claimed they had been threatened. Mobs protested outside the house that had been the site of the party, banging pots and pans at early hours of the morning.

Photographs of lacrosse team members had been posted prominently around Durham and on the Duke University campus with accompanying captions requesting that they come forward with information about the incident.

=== Media policies regarding identity revelation of accusers and accused ===
Fox News was the sole national television news outlet to reveal Mangum's photo following the dismissal of the case, although MSNBC and 60 Minutes revealed her name. Several major broadcasters did not publish Mangum's name at any point, including ABC, PBS, CNN, and NBC.

==== Publication of Mangum's identity ====
Partially obscured photos of Mangum at the party were broadcast by The Abrams Report on cable news channel MSNBC and by local television affiliate NBC 17 WNCN in North Carolina. On April 21, 2006, outspoken talk-radio host Tom Leykis disclosed Mangum's name during his nationally syndicated talk-radio program. Leykis has disclosed identities of accusers of sexual assault in the past. On May 15, 2006, MSNBC host Tucker Carlson disclosed Mangum's first name only on his show, Tucker. Court records presented by the defense revealed Mangum's name.

On April 11, 2007, several other mainstream media sources revealed or used Mangum's name and/or picture after the attorney general dropped all the charges and declared the players innocent. These sources include: CBS, The News & Observer, WRAL, all The McClatchy Company's newspapers (which includes 24 newspapers across the country), Fox News, The Charlotte Observer, the New York Post, Comedy Central's The Daily Show (airdate April 12, 2007) and MSNBC.

=== Effect on community relations ===
The allegations inflamed already strained relations between Duke University and its host city of Durham, with members of the Duke lacrosse team being vilified in the press and defamed on and off campus. On May 1, 2006, the New Black Panthers held a protest outside Duke University. Many of the protestors were wearing knives on their belts. "Before entering the campus, a leader of the protest said 'We are conducting an independent investigation, and we intend to enter the campus and interview lacrosse players. We seek to ensure an adequate, strong, and vigorous prosecution.' How scary is that? How could these kids be safe, in class and on campus? It tells you how out of control the thinking was, how crazy the moment was."[who said this?] The case drew national attention and highlighted racial tensions within the Durham area.

=== Jesse Jackson and Rainbow/PUSH involvement ===
In 2006, Jesse Jackson promised the Rainbow/PUSH Coalition would pay the college tuition for Mangum. Jackson said the tuition offer would still be good even if Mangum had fabricated her story.

== Aftermath ==
=== Mike Nifong ===
On June 16, 2007, the North Carolina State Bar ordered Nifong disbarred after the bar's three-member disciplinary panel unanimously found him guilty of fraud, dishonesty, deceit or misrepresentation; of making false statements of material fact before a judge; of making false statements of material fact before bar investigators, and of lying about withholding exculpatory DNA evidence.

Following the state bar's announcement, Nifong submitted a letter of resignation from his post as Durham County district attorney, that would have become effective in July 2007. However, on June 18, Durham Superior Court Judge Orlando Hudson ordered that Nifong be immediately removed from office.

On August 31, 2007, Nifong was held in criminal contempt of court for knowingly making false statements to the court during the criminal proceedings. Durham Superior Court Judge W. Osmond Smith III sentenced Nifong to one day in jail, which he subsequently served.

=== Crystal Mangum ===
On December 15, 2006, it was reported that Mangum was pregnant and the judge in the case ordered a paternity test.

In May 2008, Mangum graduated from North Carolina Central University with a degree in police psychology.

On August 22, 2008, a press release announced the planned publication in October 2008 of a memoir by Mangum, The Last Dance for Grace: The Crystal Mangum Story. The press release indicated the book "can't and doesn't deal with the complex legal aspects of the case" but that "the muddling of facts about Crystal's life, along with North Carolina Attorney General Roy Cooper's desire to settle the dispute over open file discovery, swallowed the case whole". Defense attorney Joseph Cheshire responded to the news by saying that if the book was truthful, "I think it would be fabulous, and I don't think anybody would think badly about her in any way, shape or form", but that if the memoir did not acknowledge the falsity of her allegations against the players, that he would advise them to initiate civil action against her. Her book was published later that year. In it, she continued to contend that she had been raped at the party and that the dropping of the case was politically motivated. The book outlined her earlier life, including a claim that she was first raped at the age of 14.

In November 2013, she was found guilty of second-degree murder after she stabbed boyfriend Reginald Daye, who died 10 days after. She argued that she acted in self-defense, fearing that Daye would kill her. She was sentenced to 14 to 18 years in prison.

During a December 11, 2024 podcast interview, Crystal Mangum admitted that she "made up a story that wasn't true" about the white lacrosse players who attended a party where she was hired to be a stripper, and wanted to apologize for her actions publicly.

=== Seligmann, Finnerty, and Evans ===
Seligmann and Finnerty were suspended from Duke University following their indictments; Evans had graduated the day prior. In January 2007, Seligmann and Finnerty were invited to return to Duke for the spring semester, though both declined.

On June 18, 2007, Duke University announced that it had reached a settlement with Seligmann, Finnerty and Evans. No details of the settlement were disclosed.

Fringe sources claimed Duke reportedly agreed to pay $60 million to the three accused (with each player receiving $20 million) subject to confidentiality requirements. Seligmann's attorney told the New York Daily News that the settlement was "nowhere near that much money".

Seligmann enrolled as a student at Brown University in the fall of 2007, and was an important part of Brown reaching the 2009 NCAA lacrosse tournament as well as a number 10 national ranking. He became an active fundraiser and supporter for the Innocence Project. He graduated from Brown in 2010 and from Emory University School of Law in 2013. He has stated that his experience during the Duke lacrosse case motivated him to attend law school and pursue a legal career.

Finnerty transferred to Loyola College in Maryland in July 2007, leading the team in scoring as the Greyhounds qualified for the 2010 NCAA lacrosse tournament. Finnerty graduated from Loyola with a Bachelor of Arts in Communications in May 2010.

Evans, who had already graduated from Duke before being charged, received an MBA from the Wharton School of the University of Pennsylvania in May 2012.

=== Duke men's lacrosse team ===
Not a month goes by when I am not reminded of the damage those accusations have had on my reputation and the public's perception of my character. Sometimes only time can heal wounds.

— anonymous Duke lacrosse player, 30 for 30, Fantastic Lies (2016)

In January 2007, lacrosse team member Kyle Dowd filed a lawsuit against Duke University and against a visiting associate professor and member of the Group of 88, Kim Curtis, claiming he and another teammate were given failing grades on their final paper as a form of retaliation after the scandal broke. The case was settled with the terms undisclosed except that Dowd's grade was altered to a P (for "Pass").

Professor Houston Baker, who continued to accuse Dowd and the others of being "hooligans" and "rapists", called Dowd's mother "the mother of a farm animal" after she e-mailed him. Duke Provost Peter Lange responded to Baker, criticizing Baker for prejudging the team based on race and gender, citing this as a classic tactic of racism.

Duke's athletic director at the time, Joe Alleva, who forced lacrosse coach Mike Pressler's resignation, faced criticism for his handling of this case. In 2008, Alleva announced he was leaving Duke for the athletic director position at Louisiana State University. The lacrosse team, reinstated for the 2007 season, reached the NCAA Finals as the #1 seed. The Blue Devils lost to the Johns Hopkins University Blue Jays in the championship, 12–11.

In May 2007, Duke requested that the NCAA restore a year's eligibility to the players on the 2006 men's team, part of whose season was canceled. The NCAA granted the team's request for another year of eligibility, which applies to the 33 members of the 2006 team who were underclassmen in 2006 and who remained at Duke in 2007. Four of the seniors from 2006 attended graduate school at Duke in 2007 and played for the team. In 2010, the final year in which the team included fifth-year seniors (freshmen in 2006), Duke won the NCAA Lacrosse Championship beating Notre Dame, 6–5 in overtime, to give the school its first lacrosse championship.

On June 7, 2007, it was announced that lacrosse coach Mike Pressler and Duke had reached a financial settlement. Pressler was later hired as coach by Division II (now Division I) Bryant University in Rhode Island. In October 2007, Pressler filed suit seeking to undo the settlement and hold a trial on his wrongful termination claim on the grounds that Duke spokesman John Burness had made disparaging comments about him. After Duke failed in an attempt to have the case dismissed, the matter was settled in 2010 with Duke apologizing in a press release but refusing to comment regarding any compensation to Pressler.

=== Duke University ===
On September 29, 2007, Duke President Brodhead, speaking at a two-day conference at Duke Law School on the practice and ethics of trying cases in the media, apologized for "causing the families to feel abandoned when they most needed support."

On July 12, 2010, Duke demolished the house where the party had taken place, 610 North Buchanan Boulevard, after it had sat unoccupied for the four years following the Duke lacrosse case.

=== Sgt. Mark Gottlieb ===
In July 2014, Sgt. Mark Gottlieb died by suicide in DeKalb County, Georgia, where he had worked as a paramedic.

== Lawsuits filed by players ==
On September 7, 2007, it was reported that the three accused players (Seligmann, Finnerty, and Evans), who had already settled with Duke University, planned to file a lawsuit for violations of their civil rights against the city of Durham and several city employees, unless the city agreed to a settlement including payment of $30 million over five years and the passage of new criminal justice reform laws. The city's liability insurance covers up to $5 million.

Lawyers cited three main areas of vulnerability for the city:

- The suspect-only photo identification procedure given to Mangum.
- Vast discrepancies in notes taken by Investigator Benjamin Himan during his March interview with Mangum and Sgt. Gottlieb's notes in July
- The release of a CrimeStoppers poster by the police shortly after the allegations that a woman "was sodomized, raped, assaulted and robbed. This horrific crime sent shock waves throughout our community."

Durham declined the settlement offer and on October 5, 2007, the three accused players filed a federal lawsuit alleging a broad conspiracy to frame them. Named in the suit were Nifong, the lab that handled the DNA work, the city of Durham, the city's former police chief, the deputy police chief, the two police detectives who handled the case and five other police department employees. The players were seeking unspecified damages, and also wanted to place the Durham Police Department under court supervision for 10 years, claiming the actions of the police department posed "a substantial risk of irreparable injury to other persons in the City of Durham". According to the suit, Nifong engineered the conspiracy to help him win support for his election bid. Nifong reportedly told his campaign manager that the case had "provided him with 'millions' of dollars in free advertising".

On January 15, 2008, the city of Durham filed a motion to remove itself as a defendant, arguing it had no responsibility for Nifong's actions. On the same day, Nifong filed for bankruptcy. On May 27, 2008, Judge William L. Stocks lifted the stay from Nifong's bankruptcy filing and ruled that the plaintiffs' lawsuit could go forward.

On May 16, 2014, the three accused lacrosse players and the City of Durham settled their long-running lawsuit. Seligmann, Finnerty, and Evans agreed to dismiss their lawsuit and received no monetary compensation whatsoever. The city agreed to make a $50,000 grant to the North Carolina Innocence Inquiry Commission.

== Lawsuit filed by non-accused players and their families ==
On February 21, 2008, the families of 38 of the lacrosse team's 47 members who were not accused filed a 225-page lawsuit against Duke University, the Duke University Hospital, the city of Durham, and various officials of each organization for multiple claims of harassment, deprivation of civil rights, breach of contract and other claims.

A Duke University spokesperson responded that "we have now seen the lawsuit and as we said before, if these plaintiffs have a complaint, it is with Mr. Nifong. Their legal strategy – attacking Duke – is misdirected and without merit. To help these families move on, Duke offered to cover the cost of any attorneys' fees or other out-of-pocket expenses, but they rejected this offer. We will vigorously defend the university against these claims." The city never released an official response to the suit. The lawsuit against the university was settled out of court in 2013. Neither side would discuss the details of the settlement.

== ESPN documentary: Fantastic Lies ==
The 2016 documentary film Fantastic Lies, which centered on the case and its aftermath, was part of ESPN's 30 for 30 film series. It premiered on March 13, 2016, exactly 10 years after the lacrosse players hosted the house party where Mangum claimed she was raped.

Among the journalists invited to contribute was ESPN college basketball analyst and Duke graduate Jay Bilas, who in his other capacity as a practicing attorney later wrote a letter to the university administration criticizing their handling of the entire case and describing president Brodhead as "incapable of effectively leading Duke into the future." Crystal Mangum was approached by the film crew to tell her side of the story and agreed to do so, but prison officials would not allow her to be filmed. None of the players involved in the case appeared in the film, but Seligmann's parents and Finnerty's father did.

== See also ==
- Racial hoax
- Tawana Brawley rape allegations
- A Rape on Campus
- False accusation of rape
