= Freund =

Freund (German for friend) is a surname. Notable people with the surname include:

== Family names ==
- August Freund, Austrian chemist
  - Freund reaction, discovered in 1881 by August
- Bernhard II. Erich Freund, Duke of Saxe-Meiningen (1800–1882)
- Bill Freund (cyclist) (born 1941), American cyclist
- Bill Freund (historian) (1944–2020), American historian in South Africa
- Carl (William Freund) Walther (1858–1915), German gunsmith
- Caroline Freund, American economist
- Christine Freund, shooting victim
- Christoph Freund, Austrian football player and manager
- Deborah Anne Freund, American academic administrator
- Don Freund (born 1947, Pittsburgh), American composer and academic
- Ðuro Freund, Yugoslav fencer
- Ernst Freund (1864–1932), American legal scholar
- Etelka Freund (1879–1977), Hungarian pianist
- Lawrence Joseph "Frank" Freund (1875–1933), baseball catcher
- Gisèle Freund (1912–2000), photographer
- Hildegard Freund (1883–1933), Austrian politician and social campaigner
- Hugo Freund Sonnenschein, American economist and educational administrator
- James Freund (1946–1976) American murder victim
- Jacob Lincoln Freund (1918–2010), American actor
- Jim Freund, radio personality
- John Christian Freund (1848–1924), co-founder of Music Trades magazine
- Jonas Charles Hermann Freund (1808–1879), Austrian-British physician
- Jules T. Freund (1890–1960), immunologist
- Karl Freund (1890–1969), cinematographer and film director
- Kurt Freund (1914–1996), physician and sexologist
- Leopold Freund (1868–1943), Jewish Austrian radiologist
- Marya Freund (1876–1966), French soprano
- Maurice Freund (1943–2026), French businessman and tourism personality
- Michael Freund (disambiguation):

- Michael Freund (historian)
- Michael Freund (activist), founder and chairman of the Jewish organization Shavei Israel

- Moshe Aryeh Freund (1894–1996), Israeli rabbi
- Otto Kahn-Freund (1900–1979), legal scholar
- Oliver Freund (born 1970), German footballer
- Paul A. Freund (1908–1992), American jurist and legal scholar
- Peter B. Freund (born 1967), American sports team owner
- Petra Schürmann-Freund (1933–2010), German model, TV announcer, and actress
- Renate Freund (born 1939), German author
- Severin Freund, German ski jumper
- Steffen Freund (born 1970), German footballer
- Steve Freund (born 1952), blues guitarist, vocalist, bandleader and record producer
- Tom Freund, American singer-songwriter
- Wilhelm Freund (1806–1894), German philologist and lexicographer
- Wilhelm Alexander Freund (1833–1917), German gynecologist
- Wilhelm Salomon Freund (1831–1915), German lawyer and politician
- Yoav Freund, researcher

=== Freundt ===
- Tracy Freundt, Peruvian model

== Other ==
- Freund's adjuvant, immune system booster used in some vaccines
- Der Amerikanische Freund, 1977 film by Wim Wenders
- Der Freund ("The Friend"), a literary magazine published by Axel Springer
- Lied für einen Freund ("Song For A Friend"), the German entry in the Eurovision Song Contest 1988
- Andy mein Freund, 1976 song by German singer Sandra
- Freund-Heintz House, historic building in Cincinnati, Ohio
- Freund–Rubin compactification
- Killinger and Freund Motorcycle

== See also ==
- Freunde (disambiguation)
- Freundlich
- Similar names: Freud, etc.
