= The Music Trades =

American trade magazine

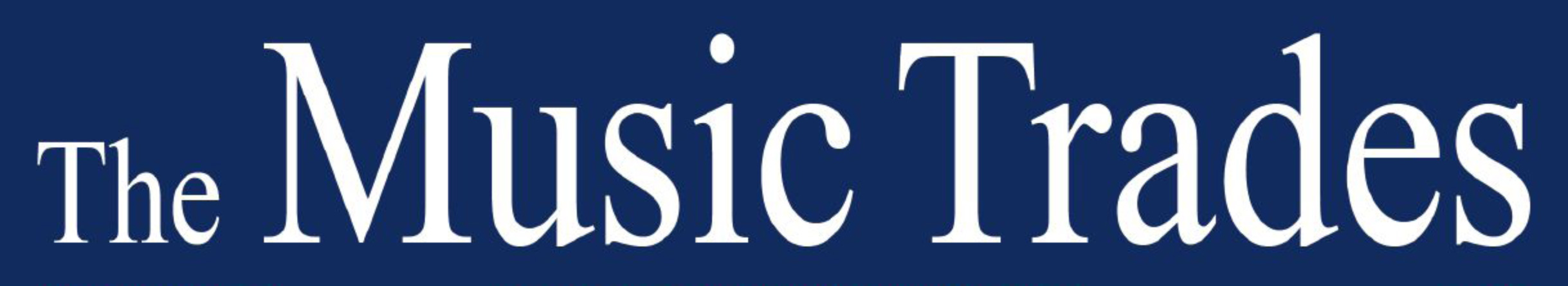
- Editor: Brian T. Majeski
- Former editors: John Francis Majeski, Jr.
- Frequency: Monthly
- Format: Print; Digital; Mobile device
- Publisher: Paul Anton Majeski
- Founder: John Christian Freund; Milton Weil
- Founded: 1890; 136 years ago
- First issue: January 3, 1891
- Company: The Music Trades Corporation
- Country: United States
- Based in: Englewood, New Jersey
- Language: English
- Website: www.musictrades.com
- ISSN: 0027-4488
- OCLC: 60615892

The Music Trades is an American trade magazine that covers a broad spectrum of music and music commerce, domestically and abroad. Founded in New York City in 1890, it has been based in Englewood, New Jersey, since the mid-1970s. The Music Trades is one of the oldest continuously published trade publications in the world. (Note: Railway Age, founded in 1856 Hairdressers Journal International, founded in 1888 Timber Trades Journal, founded in 1873) Few publications have been as long closely held by a single family.

== History ==
=== Freund and Weil: 1890-1927 ===
The Music Trades was founded in 1890 by John Christian Freund (1848–1924) and Milton Weil (1871–1935). Eight years later, they founded Musical America, the oldest American magazine on classical music.

==== John Christian Freund ====
Freund, who matriculated in 1868 at Exeter College, Oxford, but left after three years without a degree, had first been a playwright and actor. He emigrated to New York in 1871. In 1875, he founded The Music Trade Review, (Note: The Musical Trade Review founded by Freund should not be confused with the Music Trade Journal founded in New York City in 1877 by Charles Avery Welles (1848–1913), first named The Music Trade Journal, then renamed in 1879 as The Musical Critic and Trade Review, then renamed again around 1883 as The Music Trade Review, and soon thereafter owned by "Colonel" Edward Lyman Bill (1862–1916).) a fortnightly publication that he later renamed The Musical and Dramatic Times and Music Trade Review. The publication ran for about two years. In 1878, Freund founded the Musical Times, soon renamed the Musical and Dramatic Times. On January 7, 1882, Freund launched a weekly magazine, Music: A Review, (Note: Music, A Review, was published weekly on Thursdays, but dated on Saturdays. Vol. 1, no. 1. January 7, 1882. Insert: The Music Trade.) which contained an insert called The Music Trade. Sometime on or before July 8, 1882, Freund changed the magazine's name to Music and Drama, supplemented by Freund's Daily Music and Drama. Music and Drama evolved into The Music Trades.

In 1884, Freund and John Travis Quigg (1839–1893) co-founded The American Musician, which during its seven-year run became the official publication of the National League of Musicians union, the forerunner of the American Federation of Musicians. Before founding the American Musician, Henry Cood Watson (1818–1875) began in 1864 the publication Watson's Art Journal, devoted to music criticism and trade. Watson died in 1875 and his Journal was taken over by his pupil, William M. Thoms, who improved it, renamed it American Art Journal, edited it until his retirement in 1906, then, upon his retirement, merged it with the American Musician.

Around 1895, Freund's younger brother, Harry Edward Freund (1863–1950), was editor of Musical Weekly, which continued as a weekly with a new name, beginning January 1896, as The Musical Age. The publication was aimed at piano dealers.

==== Legacy of Freund and Weil ====
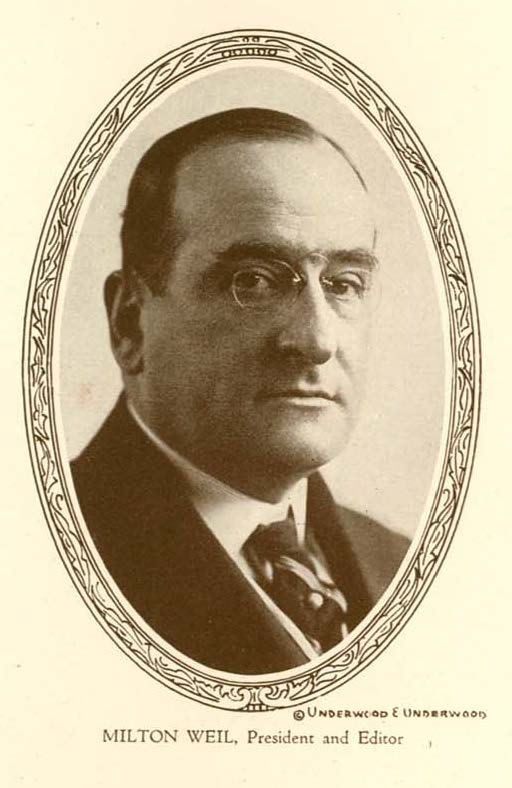
Milton Weil, 1926

Freund and Weil were exponents of American classical music, although Freund had become a naturalized United States citizen on November 2, 1903. Their publications Musical America and The Music Trades complemented each other, and gave their editors a unique view of the growth of classical music in America and its international rank, as an art form and in commerce. Both publications reached an international readership. Freund and Weil held sway as impresarios and movement leaders of American classical music. Their publications flourished during the early 1900s — on a new wave of American composers, including those of the Second New England School — joined by foreign composers who emigrated to America in a flood of nearly 25 million Europeans after 1880. In commerce, 1875 to 1932 represented a golden age of piano making — nearly 364,545 were sold at the peak in 1909, according to the National Piano Manufacturers Association, notably in New York City and Chicago.

Freund and Weil's publications gave them broad access in the field of music. They served as bridges between the art and the money, connecting artists, organizations, commerce, and public policy. The spectrum that both publications collectively chronicled gave Freund and Weil a strong platform to serve as advocates, opinion leaders, conciliators, counselors, arbiters, and ambassadors for music and the music trades in America. As an example, Freund and Weil helped found the National Music Managers Association (for national managers) and the National Concert Managers' Association (for local managers), aimed at improving cooperation between the two for the benefit of musicians. (Note: Milton Weil of this article should not be confused with: Milton Weil (1888–1937), the Chicago music publisher and composer.; Milton Weil (1869–1938), (i) former secretary-treasurer of the Driggs & Smith Company, piano dealers in Waterbury, Connecticut, until 1912,(ii) manager of the retail department in New York for Krakauer Brothers from 1914 to 1929, (iii) retail manager of Sohmer & Co's. retail department beginning about 1931, and (iv) a piano salesman with the American Piano Company.; Milton Weil (1876–1934), stock broker based in New York City, co-founder of Gotham Silk Hosiery Company, and collector of cameos and intaglios that were bequeathed by his estate to the Metropolitan Museum of Art.) In 1918, Freund and Weil helped found the Musical Alliance of the United States, an organization that endures today. Weil served as founding secretary-treasurer, while Freund, the founding president, called upon the group to organize "all workers in the field, from the man at the bench in a piano factory to the conductor of the great symphony."

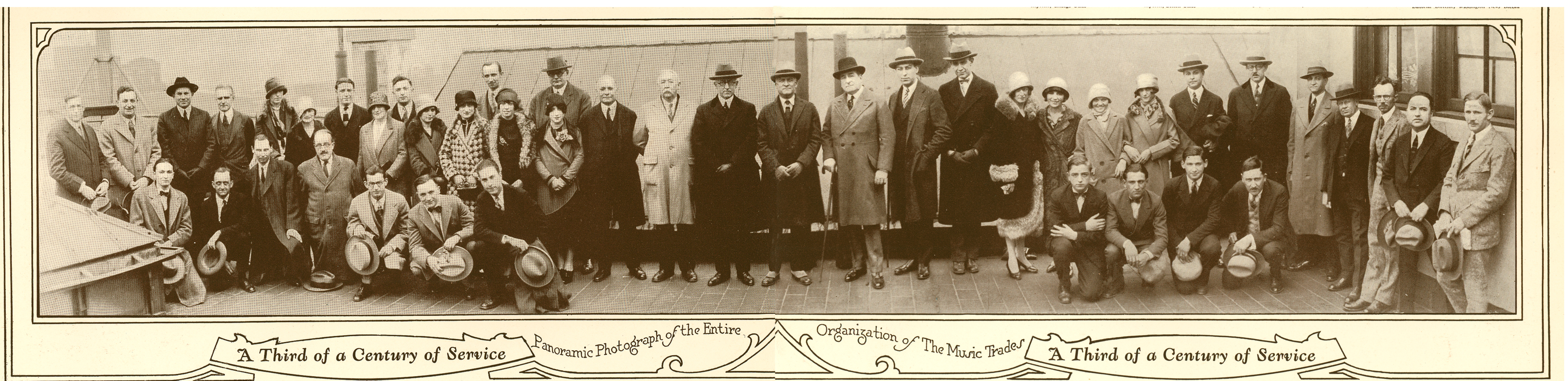
Music Trades staff in 1926

=== Trade Publications: 1927-29 ===
On June 13, 1927, three years after Freund died, Weil put The Music Trades and Musical America up for sale.

One bid came from John Francis Majeski, Sr. (1892–1971), who in 1910 had joined the staff of Musical America and become Weil's assistant. Majeski offered a quarter-million dollars for the pair, but was outbid by a new syndicate that also acquired four other publications (The American Architect, The Barbers' Journal, Beauty Culture, and Perfumers' Journal) and consolidated them all into a new company called Trade Publications, Inc.

The deal was handled by investment bankers Schluter & Company and Shields & Company, which issued $1,100,000 (equivalent to $20,387,931 in 2025) in preferred and common stock. Shields & Company and Nixon & Company, of Philadelphia, also made a public offering of ten-year 6 1/2 percent gold bonds of Trade Publications, that carried warrants to purchase common stock at a price that closely corresponded with the value of the stock.

Trade Publication's officers included Walter Crawford Howey (1882–1954), president; Verne Hardin Porter (1888–1942), vice president and secretary; and Edwin John Rosencrans (1870–1935), treasurer. The board of directors included these three plus G. Murray Hulbert, John Zollikoffer Lowe, Jr. (1884–1951), and Joseph Urban. Howey and Porter had been executives of the Hearst Corporation. Rosencrans, a civil engineer, was the managing editor of The American Architect; years earlier, he and architect John F. Jackson (1867–1948) had a partnership that designed more than 70 YMCAs. Lowe, a lawyer, had been a partner in a law firm with Samuel Seabury.

Howey, who had been the founding managing editor of the New York Daily Mirror, left Trade Publications on August 1, 1928, to retake his old job.

==== 1929 bankruptcy ====
The following year, Trade Publications filed for bankruptcy. The Irving Trust Co. was appointed receiver for the company, which had liabilities of $716,839 (equivalent to $13,440,731 in 2025) and assets of $59,511.

On July 19, 1929, bankruptcy referee John Logan Lyttle (1879–1930) oversaw the auction of the magazines. Majeski, Weil's former assistant, bought four of the six for $45,200: Musical America, The Music Trades, The Barbers' Journal, and Beauty Culture. About $11,000 of the total went for Musical America and The Music Trades, the publications for which Majeski had offered a quarter-million dollars three years earlier. The acquisition included the publications' names, a collection of back issues, and a few months of office space in the Steinway Building.

A few months before the bankruptcy auction, Weil was said to have sold his interest in Trade Publications for $200,000 (equivalent to $3,750,000 in 2025) in preferred stock. He and his wife—Henrietta Lander (née Rich; 1874–1935) — then moved to Paris with $5,000. Weil's father, Jacob A. Weil (1835–1913), was a Paris-born American and his mother, Dina (née Lilienthal; born 1843), was a German-born American.

==== Double suicide of Milton and Henrietta Weil ====
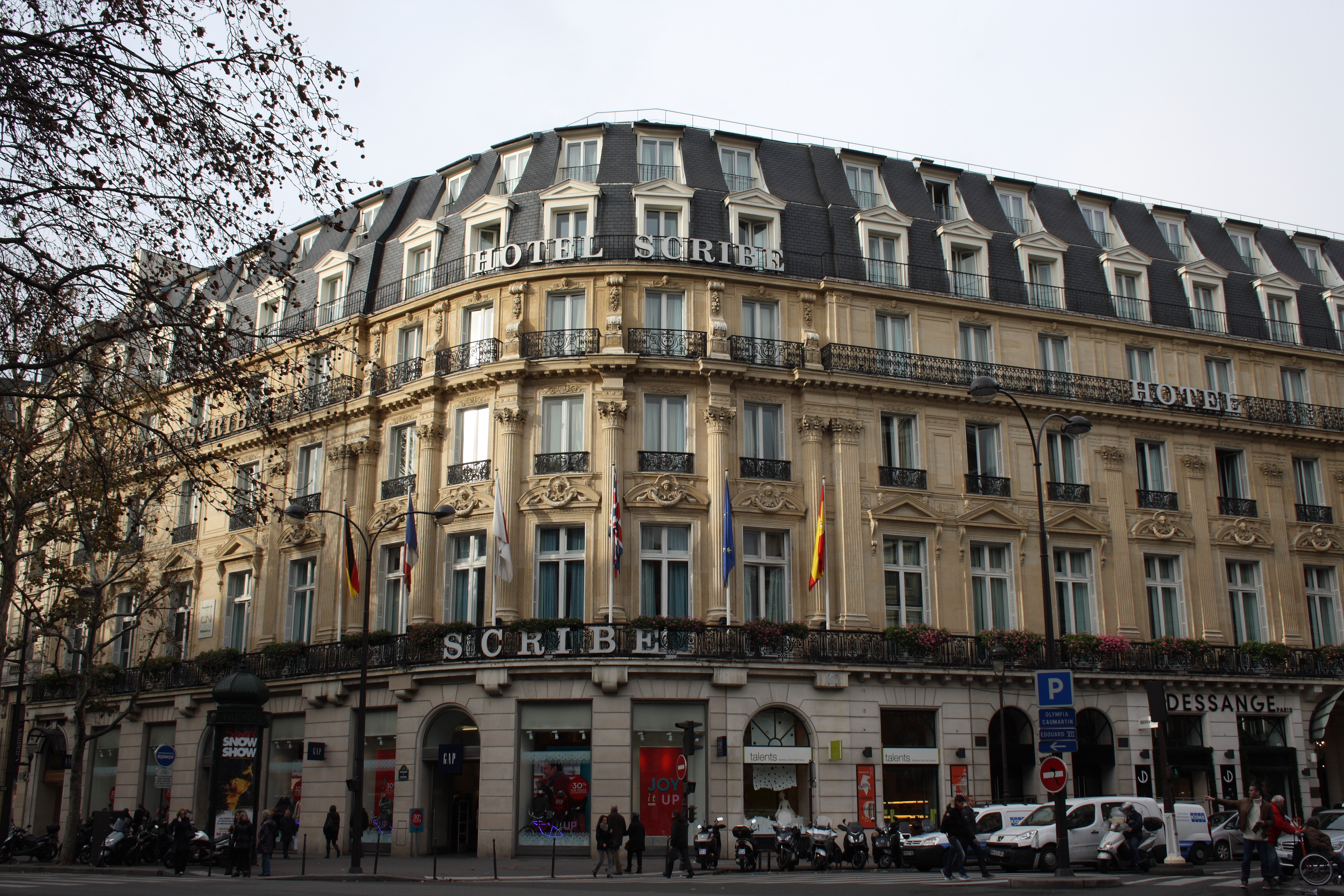
Hotel Scribe, Paris, 2011

After the bankruptcy sale wiped out Weil's stake in the publication, he and his wife Henrietta spent several years attempting unsuccessfully to rebuild their finances. Contemporary newspaper accounts attributed their subsequent deaths primarily to financial losses stemming from the pre-Crash of 1929, then the Crash and the Great Depression. However, a letter left by the couple (dated May 19, 1935) and later preserved in U.S. State Department consular records presents a more complex explanation. In it, the Weils referred both to the loss of their fortune and to what they described as chronic and incurable health problems – for Milton, a cyst on the back of his neck (for 5 or 6 years) and for Henrietta, a great sufferer for years from rheumatic gout/inflammation in her hands and above her ankles. Their letter stated that their circumstances had become hopeless and that they no longer had sufficient means to continue. On May 22, 1935, while staying at the Hotel Scribe in the Opera District of Paris, they carried out a double-suicide pact, each, according to their letter, ingesting 25 grains (1,620 mg) of the barbiturate Veronal. Henrietta Weil died at the American Hospital in Neuilly-sur-Seine on May 23, 1935, 7:40 am; and Milton Weil died there, 23 hours and 25 minutes later – May 24, 7:05 am. They were buried beside each other in the New Cemetery of Neuilly-sur-Seine.

=== The Majeski years: 1929–present ===
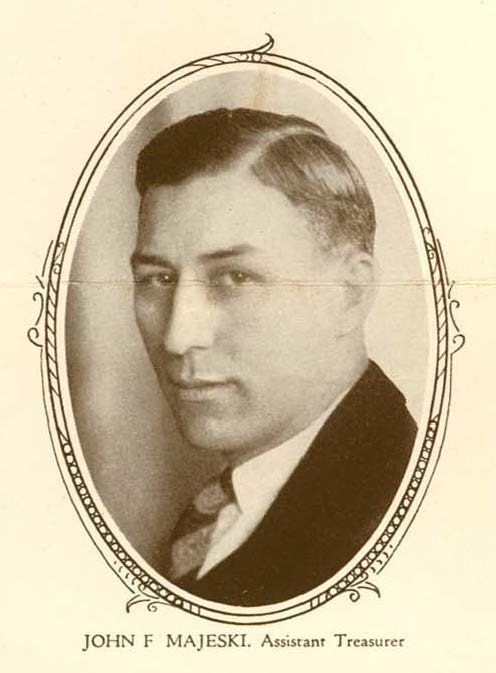
John F. Majeski, Sr., 1926

On August 22, 1929, some five weeks after Majeski acquired the publications at bankruptcy auction, he formed three holding companies: The Music Trades Corporation, for The Music Trades; The Musical America Corporation, for Musical America, and Beauty Culture Publishing Corporation, for Barbers Journal and Beauty Culture.

In 1959, Majeski sold Musical America—which would merge with High Fidelity in 1964—but retained his interest in The Musical Trades, and served as its publisher until his death in 1971. The publisher's job was taken over by his son, John Francis Majeski, Jr. (1921–2011), who was already the magazine's editor. The younger Majeski served as editor until 1982 and publisher until 1985.

In 2005, he received the American Music Conference Lifetime Achievement Award for his achievements, contribution to music, and long tenure as editor of The Music Trades.

== Current ownership ==
As of 2022, the Majeski family continues its ownership of The Music Trades through its holding company, a New Jersey entity based in Englewood. Paul Anton Majeski (born 1960), has been publisher since 1985, and Brian T. Majeski (born 1956), editor since 1982. Paul holds a bachelor's degree in accounting from Ohio Wesleyan University (1982) and Brian holds a bachelor's degree in philosophy from Lawrence University (1978).

== Selected editors and publishers ==
	Editors-in-chief
1890–1924	John Christian Freund (1848–1924)
1924–1927	Milton Weil (1871–1935) was editor through July 2, 1927
1946–1947	Samuel Charles Klores (né Shlomo Chaskell Klores; 1913–1994)
1946–1951	John Francis Majeski, Sr. (1892–1971)
1951–1982	John Francis Majeski, Jr. (1921–2011)
1982–present	Brian T. Majeski (born 1956)
	Managing editors
1917–1918	Charles Barrett Bowne (1889–1952) was an alumnus of Brown University (1911), he went on to become a journalist with his hometown paper, the Poughkeepsie Eagle-News, then four years with the New York Evening Sun, then he enlisted in the U.S. Infantry as a 2nd Lieutenant from April 4, 1918, to November 20, 1918
1918–1919	Charles Fulton Oursler (1893–1952) was the first managing editor who, in that position, had his name printed in the masthead — Vol. 56, No. 21, November 23, 1918
1919–19??	After returning from World War I, Charles Barrett Bowne (1889–1952) became an editorial editor in 1926
1922–1924	William Joseph Dougherty (1893–1951), formerly of the Poughkeepsie Eagle-News, left in 1917 to become city editor of the New Rochelle Pioneer, then joined the Music Trades staff in 1918 as news editor under Charles Barrett Bowne. He went on to become assistant managing editor, then managing editor (1922)
1924–1927	Milton Weil (1871–1935) was managing editor through July 2, 1927
1922–192?	William Joseph Dougherty (1893–1951)
1927–1928	William Joseph Dougherty (1893–1951), again became managing editor with Vol. 74, No. 3, July 16, 1927; then in 1928, general manager (see "General manager" below)
1928–1929	Arthur A. Kaye (1895–1967)
1929–1946	Emil Raymond (1891–1946); beginning with Vol. 77, No. 17, December 1929, Raymond became managing editor
1930–193?	Harry P. Knowles, beginning with Vol. 78, No. 7, July 1930, Knowles became managing editor
1930s–1943	William Joseph Dougherty (1893–1951), after World War II, October 1945, Dougherty became associate editor of Music Trade Review, then editor of Musical Merchandise, one of several magazines founded by Glad Henderson (né Gladston Winchester Henderson; 1884–1942), then, beginning around 1949, advertising and sales promotion manager for Mastro Industries Inc., founded by the French-born reed manufacturer Mario Maccaferri (1900–1993), then, beginning around 1950, executive editor of Music Dealer
2000–present	Richard T. Watson
	General manager
1928–1928	William Joseph Dougherty (1893–1951), after again serving as managing editor beginning with Vol. 74, No. 3, July 16, 1927, became general manager at the beginning of 1928, but left December 1928 to become editor of both The Soda Fountain the Music Trade Review, both owned by Federated Business Publications, Inc. He left in 1932 to become general manager of The American Hairdresser, a monthly trade magazine founded in 1877
	Associate editors
1947–1974	Henry Clay Fischer (1900–1978)
1978–2007	Grace Lila Frary (1934–2013), a graduate of Syracuse University School of Journalism, worked 31 years as an editor, joining in 1976, serving as associate editor sometime before 1978 until her retirement in 2007
2007–present	Sonia Clare Kanigel (born 1982)
	Staff editors
1940s	Louis Ernst (1871–1947)
1902–1942	Morrison ("Squire") Swanwick (1865–1946) started at The Music Trades in 1902 as a reporter; from 1929 to 1942, when he retired, he was vice president and director
	Correspondent editors
1918–19??	Katharine M. Kelly (1892–1974) was from Poughkeepsie and a 1913 graduate of Vassar College. After working for The Music Trades, Kelly went on to work with Women's Wear Daily (editor), the Meriden Record, New Haven Register, The Fashionist (managing editor), Fashionable Dress (critic), Apparel World (editor), and Vogue (contributor). She married John Anthony Redegeld (1899–1996), a longtime senior executive with AT&T.
	Columnists
Present	Bob Popyk (né Robert S. Popyk; born 1940) has published influential articles aimed at the business of music for musicians
	Publishers
1890–1924	John Christian Freund (1848–1924); The Music Trades Company
1924–1927	Milton Weil (1871–1935); The Music Trades Company
1927–1928	Walter Crawford Howey (1882–1954), President; Trade Publications, Inc.
1928–1929	Verne Hardin Porter (1888–1942), President; Trade Publications, Inc.
1929–1971	John Francis Majeski, Sr. (1892–1971); The Music Trades Corporation (a New York corporation from 1929 to 1972)
1971–1985	John Francis Majeski, Jr. (1921–2011); The Music Trades Corporation (a New Jersey corporation from 1972 to present)
1985–present	Paul Anton Majeski (born 1960); The Music Trades Corporation (a New Jersey corporation from 1972 to present)

== Selected articles, quotes, and reviews ==
Articles and quotes

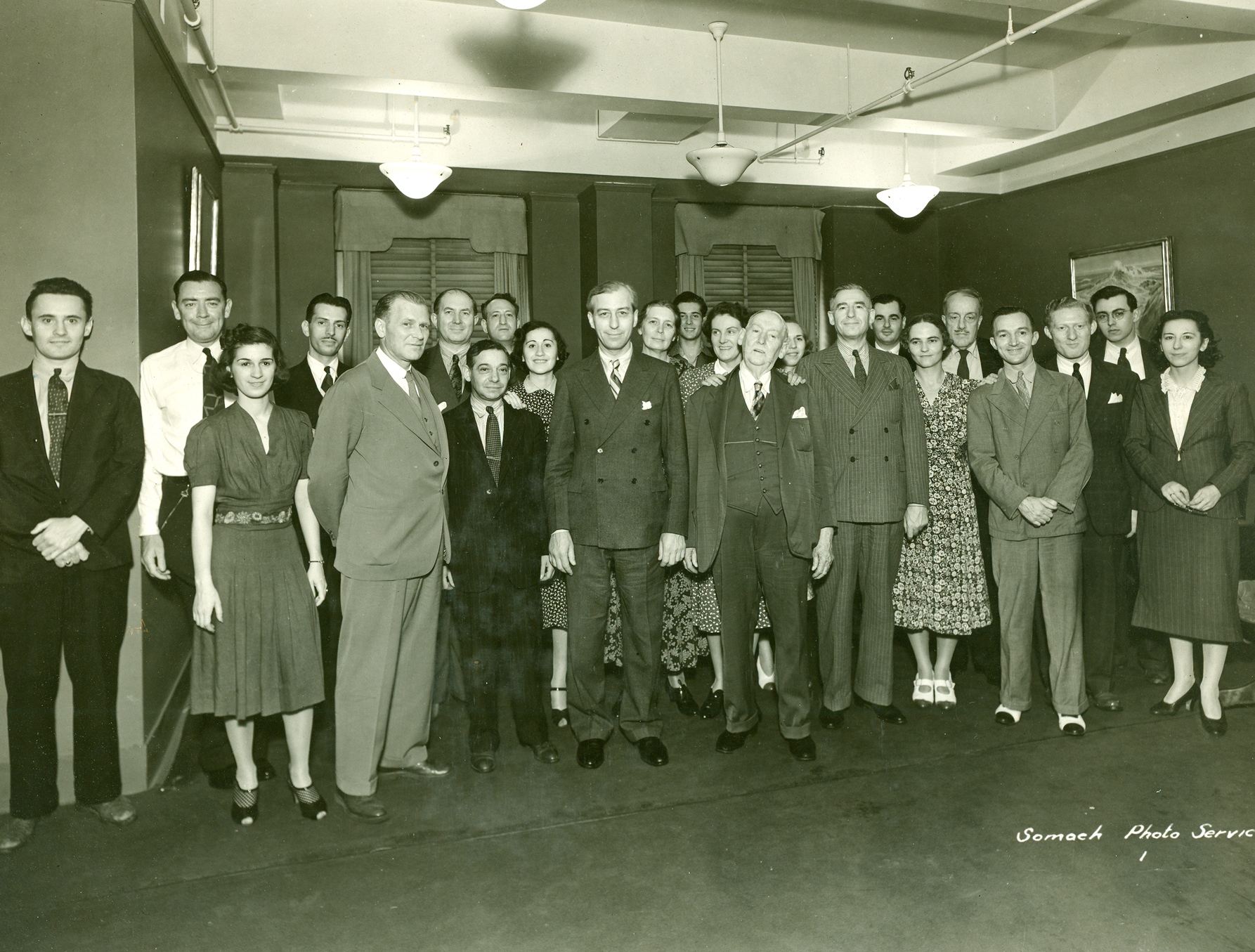
Music Trades staff photo, 1948, John F. Majeski Sr., center, in the double breasted suit

- Vol. 21, No. 21, May 25, 1901: Responding to a 1901 campaign by the National Musicians Union against ragtime, [the campaign is] "rather quixotic. There are ears to which "rag-time" is more fascinating than grand opera, and ears of this sort are more numerous"
- "Too Many Piano Factories in Chicago," by Philip J. Meahl (1865–1933), Vol. 23, No. 1, January 4, 1902, pg. 13: "There is some likelihood of the piano manufacturing business being overdone"
- "Succeeded Without Being a "Catalog Dealer,'", by Bert Aaron Rose (1866–1940), Vol. 64, No. 26, December 23, 1922, pg. 32: The author, owner of the Metropolitan Music Co. in Minneapolis and director of bands at the University of Minnesota, illuminates the threat of catalog sales, similar to early 21st-century concerns over online sales vs. physical stores
- "First Selmer Silver Saxophone is Pronounced Superior to Brass Instrument by Rudy Wiedoeft," Vol. 73, No. 15, April 9, 1927, pg. 35
- "The Petrof Piano Saga" (feature story), Vol. 156, No. 12, January 2009, pps. 112–118: The article is an example of history and commentary works of the magazine

Historic reviews

Harry Botsford (born 1890) wrote an article titled "Diversified Needs of the Trade Magazine," in The Editor (Ridgewood, New Jersey), Vol. 52, No. 7, April 10, 1920, pps. 4–5. In it, he lauds The Music Trades as "one of the foremost publications which may be classed as a trade journal," and proceeds to examine a particular issue — Vol. 58, No. 25, December 20, 1919. Botsford points out that the articles in the issue are diverse, but at first glance, seemingly not relevant for a lack of direct connections to the music field. Yet he sees how topics of other sectors and industries — and commerce as a whole — relate to music commerce. Botsford stated that the articles, all of them, were interesting and well-written; but averred that each writing assignment might have been better-filled by "a live writer in the field, if said writer would have used his brain." Botsford, a trade writer himself, seemed to be challenging his profession to exercise more interdisciplinarity writing. Referring to Secor's article, Botsford posed the question, "Why couldn't some of we fellows who write for farm papers have thought of the idea? Have we been overlooking possibilities?"

The December 20, 1919 (Vol. 57, no. 25), issue, as a whole, bears some similarities to some of the special macro-economic issues of the 21st-century. Botsford's review covered the following articles by authors, nearly all of whom were trade publication editors:

Page
9	"The Business Press Making Big Strides" Gustavus Dedman (G.D.) Crain, Jr. (1885–1973), founder of Crain Communications in 1916 and later, in 1930, founder of Advertising Age
13	"Pricking the Oil Bubble of the Economy" Iverson Currie Wells (1873–1950), editor of The Black Diamond
23	"Our Dependence Upon Machinery" Fred Herbert Colvin (1867–1965), principal associate editor of American Machinist
30	"The Farmer a Rube? Try Him On Your Piano!" Alson Secor (1871–1958), editor of Successful Farming
35	"Present and Future of Our Export Trade" Benjamin Olney Hough (1865–1931), editor of the American Exporter
41	"Salient Insurance Points for Businessmen" Julius Wilcox (1837–1924), editor of Insurance magazine
45	"The Modern Trend of Advertising" Paul William Kearney (1896–1970), associate editor of Advertising & Selling
49	"'Hominess' The Modern Furniture Ideal Design" Earle Manton Wakefield (1889–1941), former editor of the Furniture Record
55	"The Open Mystery of Period Styles" Alastair Robertson-McDonald (1883–1927), formerly of the editorial staff of The Upholsterer and The Furniture World
56	"Coal in 1919 with a Forecast for 1920" Robert Dawson Hall (1872–1961), editor of Coal Age
49	"How the Inland Waterways Project is Progressing" Gen. Felix Agnus (1839–1925), publisher of the Baltimore American
169	"To Complete Canal Chain – Congress to Be Asked for $45,000,000 Appropriation for New Jersey Ship Canal"
99	"Contracts of Minors" Ralph Horatio Butz (1889–1972); Previously published: "Contracts of Minors". American Blacksmith – Auto & Tractor Shop. Vol. 18, no. 1. October 1918. p. 129. LCCN 08022043
163	"Product Scarcity Makes the Iron and Steel Situation Acute" Charles E. Wright, editorial staff of The Iron Age
163	"The Pig Iron Market in 1919" Charles J. Stark (1882–1978), editor of the Iron Trade Review
165	"Hardwood Trade Works to Increase Output as It Enters New Year With Deepened Stocks" Arthur Lee Ford (1871–1939), editor of the American Lumberman
167	"Sees Prosperity Ahead in Hide and Leather" Rudolph Charles Jacobsen (1860–1929), editor of Hide and Leather

== Regular features and sister publications ==
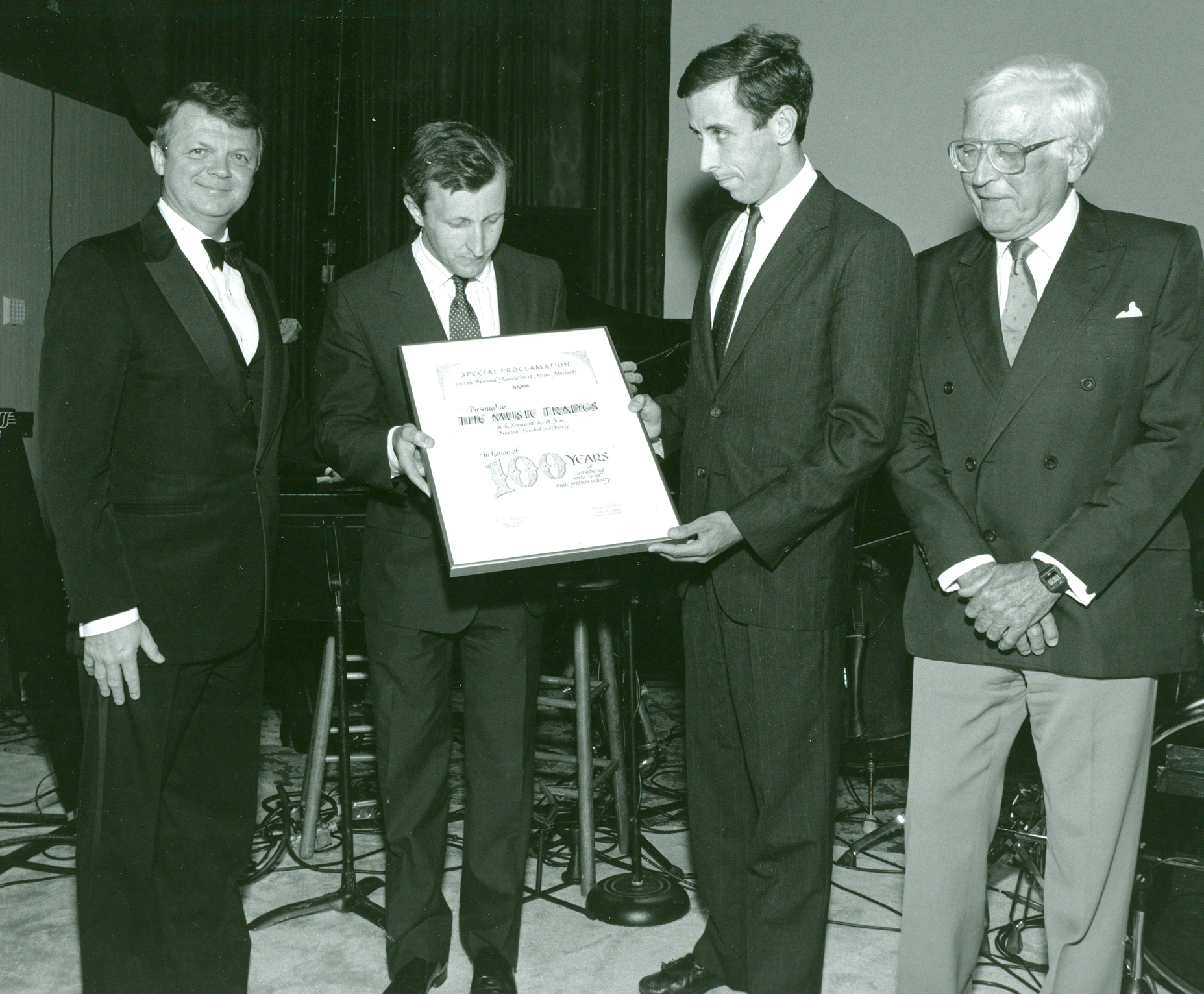
The Music Trades Centennial Celebration in Chicago, 1990; (l-r) Larry Linkin, National Association of Music Merchants CEO; Brian T. Majeski, editor; Paul A. Majeski, publisher; John F. Majeski Jr., then editor emeritus

The Music Trades: current annual cover stories, analyses, and awards

- "201X in Review" is published in the January issue
- "The NAMM Show Special" is published in the February issue, which are released every January — in sync with the annual January event
- "Music Industry Census," published in the April issue, is an annual cover story survey of dollar volume and unit data; in 2014, it the Census covered 65 product categories, including musical instruments and audio products
- "The Top 100," published in the April issue as part of the "Music Industry Census," is an analysis and recognition of the largest U.S. suppliers of music and audio gear ranked by sales volume
- "Retailing Around the World" is published in the May issue
- "The Retail Top 200," published in the August issue, is an analysis and recognition of the largest retailers in the United States
- "The Guitar Issue" is published in the October issue
- "The Global 225," published in the December issue, is an annual analysis and recognition of leading music and audio suppliers worldwide

The Music Trades: quarterly reports and analysis

- "Quarterly Retail Sales Data" — published in the March, June, September, and December issues — is a poll of U.S. retailers (over 1,000) on sales trends of product categories and regions
- "Quarterly Import Data" — published in the March, June, September, and December issues — is a statistical supply chain report and analysis of imports

Separate reports The Music Trades publishes current industry reports, data, and analyses — separate from the magazine — aimed at all constituents in the supply chain of music products.

Sister publications

- The Purchaser's Guide to the Music Industries is published by The Music Trade Corporation. It was first published in 1897 as The Piano Purchaser's Guide, but was soon renamed The Piano & Organ Purchaser's Guide for 19XX. Sometime around the 1920s it was again renamed The Purchaser's Guide to the Music Industries, and absorbed The Piano & Organ Purchaser's Guide. Since inception, it has been published annually and, for many of its early years was included with a subscription to either The Music Trades or Musical America.
- Musical America, from 1898 to 1960 — when it was owned by Freund, then Trade Publications, Inc., then Majeski — was an affiliate publication

== Serial identification ==
Volume numbers

- Weekly: 1891–1929

The Music Trades — first published January 3, 1891, Vol. I, No. 1 — was a weekly publication from inception to February 9, 1929, Vol 77, No. 6. The following issue, dated February 15, 1928, Vol. 77, No. 7, was the first monthly, followed by March 15, 1929, Vol. 77, No. 8. As a weekly, the volume numbers changed every half year; i.e., the first half of 1924 — January 5 through June 28 — was published under Vol. 67, Nos. 1 through 26. The latter half of 1924 — July 5 through December 27 — was published as Vol. 68, Nos. 1 through 26. (Note: The volume number for The Music Trades of January 26, 1929, was incorrectly published as Vol. No. 78. The issues published the week prior and the week after were both Vols. 77) (Note: In Vol. 17, No. 4, January 28, 1899, Freund announced he would "consolidate my two papers and publish them together as Music Trades and Musical America." Each publication kept its own title and numbering)

- Monthly: 1930–present

Beginning with February 1929, when the magazine became a monthly publication, the volume numbers changed every year, initially at January, but eventually at February. For February through December 1929, the Vol. was 77.

Copyrights

- Issues of The Music Trades published through 1930 are in the public domain. As a general rule, copyright protection for published periodicals in the United States extends for 95 years from the year of publication.

Trademarks

- The title The Music Trades was first federally registered as a trademark in 1965 (Reg. No. 796,775), more than seventy years after the magazine's establishment in 1891. Additional registrations followed in 1988 (Reg. No. 1,486,887) and 2011 (Reg. No. 3,910,654); all were subsequently cancelled or allowed to expire. The 2011 registration states that The Music Trades was first used in commerce January 3, 1891.

Volume notes

== Addresses ==
During the 1890s, the executive office for The Music Trades was at 24 Union Square East, Manhattan, New York. From around 1897 to 1915, it was at 135 Fifth Avenue at 20th Street — which, at the time, was at the heart of the wholesale music trade district in New York City. From around 1915 to 1937, it was on Fifth Avenue — 505 (1915), 501 (1919). From about 1930 until the mid-1970s, the executive offices for The Music Trades were in Steinway Hall, 113 West 57th Street, Manhattan, New York. From 1927 to 1929, when The Music Trades was owned by Trade Publications, Inc., the offices were at 235 East 45th Street, Manhattan, New York. Since the mid-1970s, the executive offices have been in Englewood, New Jersey.

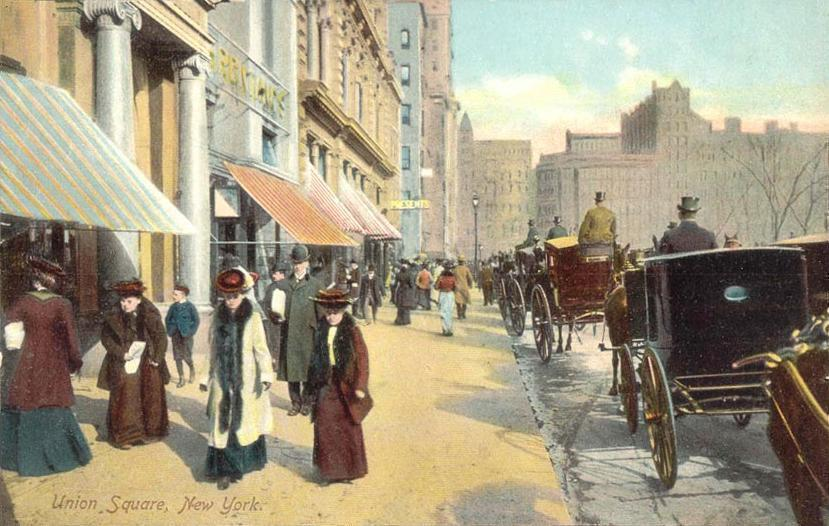
1908
Union Square

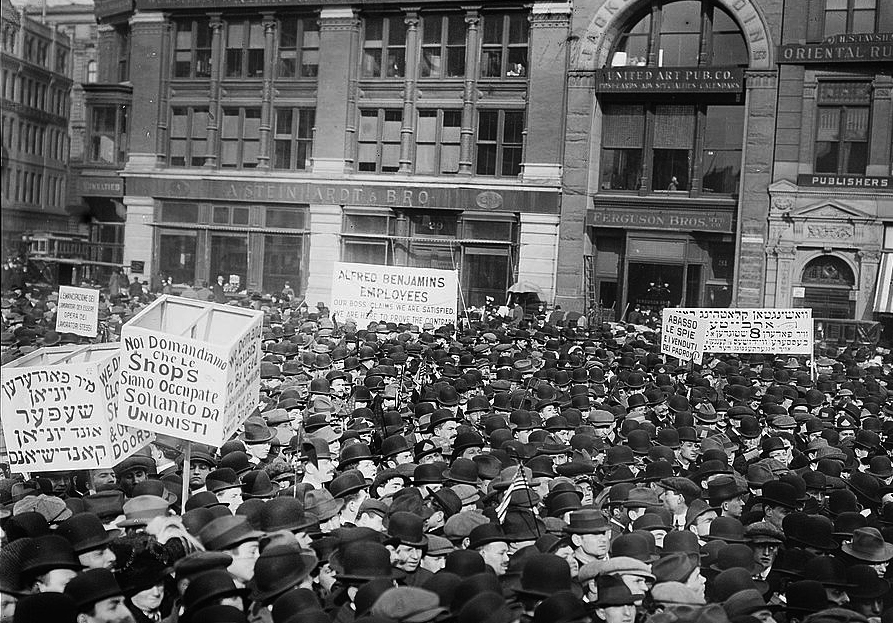
May Day, 1 May 1913
Strikers in Union Square

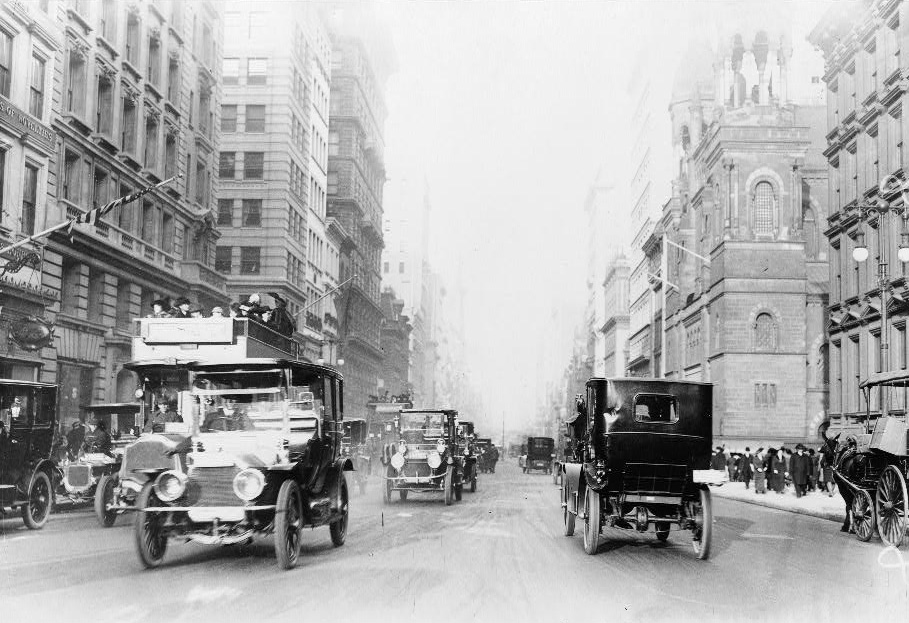
18 December 1913
Fifth Avenue
(Photo from the Library of Congress)

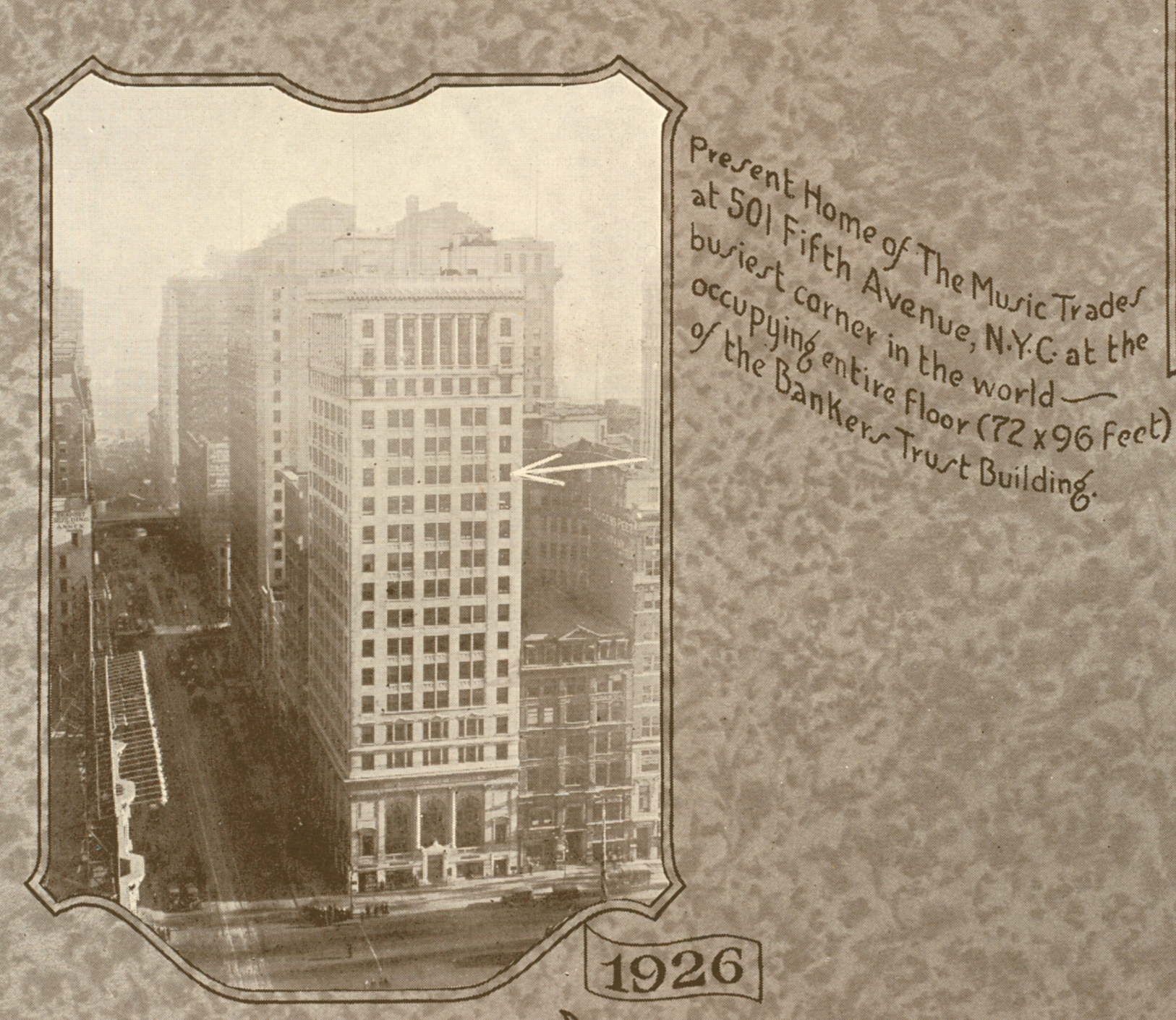
Music Trades Office
at 501 Fifth Avenue
in 1926

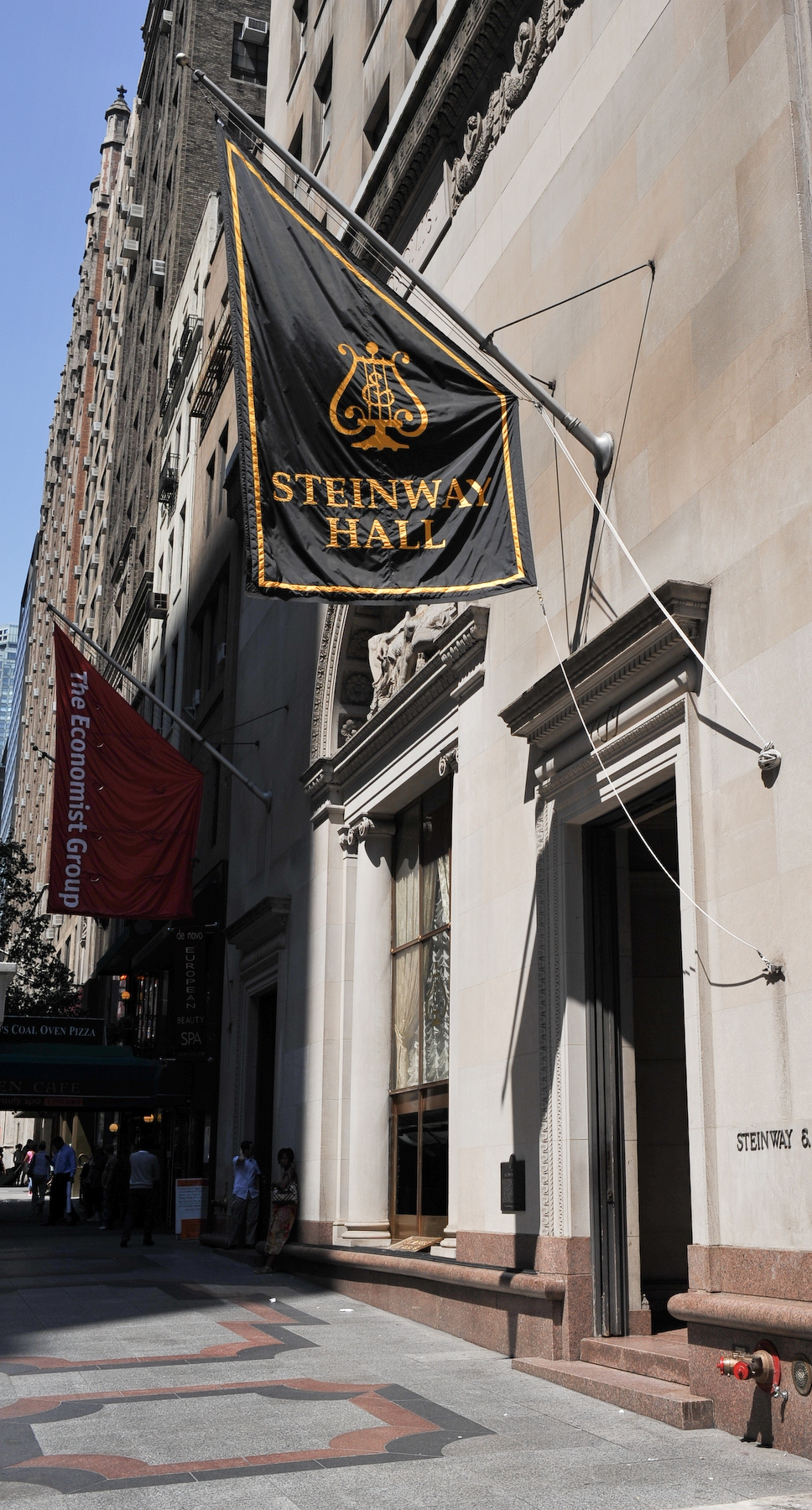
2008
Steinway Hall entrance
57th Street

== Archives, curated collections, and reproductions of The Music Trades ==
=== Online digital ===
- January 2011 – Present (monthly); The Sheridan Group
- Digital archives (incomplete), HathiTrust (digitized by Google)

Full view — weekly (originals from Princeton University)

Vol. 56 July 6 – December 28, 1918
Vol. 57 January 4 – June 28, 1919
Vol. 58 July 5 – December 27, 1919
(lacking Vols. 59 & 60, Jan–Dec 1920)
Vol. 61 January 1 – June 25, 1921
Vol. 62 July 2 – December 31, 1921
Vol. 64 July 1 – December 30, 1922

Limited (search only; fee-based) — weekly (originals from Princeton University)

Vol. 63 Jan–Jun 1922
(lacking Vol. 64, Jul–Dec 1922)
Vol. 65 Jan–Jun 1923
Vol. 66 Jul–Dec 1923

Limited (search only; fee-based) — monthly (originals from the University of Michigan)

Vols. 123-136, 1975–1988

Google Books (full online free access)

Vol. 56, July 6 – December 28, 1918
Vol. 57, January 4 – June 28, 1919
Vol. 58, July 5 – December 27, 1919
Vol. 64, July 1 – December 30, 1922
Vol. 66, July 7 – December 29, 1923 (Issues 1–26)

Google Books (search only)

Vol. 126, Issues 1–6, January – June 1978

- Gale Group

Beginning January 1989

- EBSCO Information Services

January 2006 – present

Microform

- AMS Press, Inc.

Brooklyn Navy Yard

35 mm positive microfilm
Vols. 23–117, 1902–1969 – 63 reels; OCLC 7965593, 26615425
(lacking 1906, 1911–1914, 1920)
AMS Press is the reprint publishing arm of
Abrahams Magazine Service, Inc., Gabriel Hornstein, president
Originals from the New York Public Library

- NCR Microcard Editions

The National Cash Register Company
Industrial Products Division
901 26th St, NW
Washington, D.C. 20037

Vols. 1–117, 1890–1969
Indian Head, Inc., acquired Microcards Editions from NCR on March 15, 1973, and operated it through its subsidiary, Information Handling Services (IHS), located in Englewood, Colorado
Indian Head, Inc., was acquired in 1975 by Thyssen-Bornemisza, N.V.; in 2004; Information Handling Services became IHS Inc., and in 2005, became a publicly traded company.

- University Microfilms International

16 & 35 mm positive & negative microfilm
Vols. 120–125, January 1972 – December 1977; OCLC 12633604
positive & negative microfiche
Vol. 125, January – December 1977
positive & negative microfiche or 16 & 35 mm microfilm
Vol. 126, 1978

- Chadwyck-Healey; OCLC 35957822

Alexandria, Virginia

Originals from the Boston Public Library
(Chadwyck-Healey was acquired by ProQuest in 1999)

- Brookhaven Press

La Crosse, Wisconsin

35 mm positive & negative microfilm
Vols. 1–120, 1890-1972
(lacking 1890–1902, 1911–1914, 1920)

=== Publisher-linked archives ===
- Publisher-linked digital archive of PDF back issues, spanning more than a century of publication

== See also ==
- The Colored American Magazine (re: involvement of John C. Freund)

== Bibliography ==
=== References ===
- American Foreign Service. "Reports of Deaths of American Citizens Abroad, 1835–1974". NARA Inventory 15, Entry 205, 1910–1962, Box 1467: 1930–1939. National Archives at College Park.
1. Report of the Death of an American Citizen. : NAI No. 302021. Death Reports in State Department Decimal File: 1910 to 1962, Box 1467: "1930–1939" → "France: Stoddard–Worthington." Record Group 59; Series Number: Publication A1 205.
  1. Mɪʟᴛᴏɴ Wᴇɪʟ (digital image 626 of 842). June 3, 1935 – via Ancestry.com.
    - Date of death: May 24, 1935; 7:05 ᴀ.ᴍ.
    - Place of death: American Hospital, Neuilly-sur-Seine.
    - Cause of death: Veronal Poisoning.
    - Decimal File: 351.113 WEIL, MILTON/5 GC (document 5 of 11).
  2. (Mʀꜱ.) Hᴇɴʀɪᴇᴛᴛᴀ Wᴇɪʟ (digital image 627 of 842). June 1, 1935 – via Ancestry.com.
    - Date of death: May 23, 1935; 7:40 ᴀ.ᴍ.
    - Place of death: American Hospital, Neuilly-sur-Seine.
    - Cause of death: Veronal Poisoning.
    - Decimal File: 351.113 WEIL, MILTON/4 GC (document 4 of 11).
  3. Lᴇᴛᴛᴇʀ from Mɪʟᴛᴏɴ and Hᴇɴʀɪᴇᴛᴛᴀ Wᴇɪʟ (digital images 621 & 622 of 842). May 19, 1935 – via Ancestry.com.
    - Decimal File: 351.113 WEIL, MILTON/4 GRC (document 7 of 11).
- Biography Index. → Entry → "Majeski, John F". Vol. 9: September 1970 – August 1973. Rita Volmer Louis (maiden; 1904–1985), ed. New York: H.W. Wilson Company. 1974. p. 457. LCCN 47-6532; ISBN 0-8242-0529-4; ISSN 0006-3053; OCLC 24559910 (all editions)
1. Via Internet Archive (San Francisco Public Library).
- Chester Times (May 22, 1935). "Americans Attempt Suicide in Paris". Vol. 59, whole no. 18219. Chester, Pennsylvania. p. 10 (column 7, bottom).
1. Via Newspapers.com.
- Cumberland Evening Times (May 24, 1935). "Man and Wife Die 24 Hours Apart". Vol. 68, no. 144. Cumberland, Maryland. p. 2 (column 4, bottom).
1. Via Newspapers.com.
- Doering, James Matthew (2013). The Great Orchestrator: Arthur Judson and American Arts Management. Arthur Judson and American Arts Management. Champaign, Illinois: University of Illinois Press. p. 75. LCCN 2012-33147; ISBN 978-0-2520-3741-2 (hardback), ISBN 978-0-2520-9459-0 (eBook); OCLC 837633741 (all editions), OCLC 828140136 (all editions).
1. Via Google Books (University of Illinois Press; limited preview).
- Dolge, Alfred (1848–1922) (1911–1913). Pianos and Their Makers: A Comprehensive History of the Development of the Piano (3 Vols.). Covina, California: Covina Publishing Company. pp. 416–418. LCCN 11-20107; OCLC 1199554 (all editions).
1. Vol. 1: Part Five, Chapter II – "The Trade Press" – via Google Books; University of Michigan.
- DuPree, Mary Herron (born 1944) (January 1990). "Mirror to an Age: Musical America, 1918–30". Royal Musical Association Research Chronicle. 23 (1): 137–147. JSTOR 25099408; doi:10.1080/14723808.1990.10540939; S2CID 164167826; ISSN 1472-3808; OCLC 9969842285 (article).
- Furst, Bob (né Robert Thomas Furst; 1934–2016); Redman, Robin (née Robin Marie Furst; born 1965 → daughter of Bob Furst), eds. (2012). "U.S. Piano Sales History – Brand New Pianos Sold From 1900 to Present" (online blog). Furst, late of Rancho Santa Margarita, California, and Redman of Lakewood, Colorado: Bluebook of Pianos. Archived from the original on September 15, 2014. OCLC 45030283 (1999 print ed.). → Bob Furst Bio.
1900 to 1959: Piano shipments reported by the National Piano Manufacturers Association (NPMA), now operating primarily as the Piano Manufacturers Association International (PMAI).
1960 to 2012: Piano sales reported in Music USA (annual). Chicago, Wilmette, Illinois, Carlsbad, California → LCCN 80-642143; ISSN 0197-4173; OCLC 5087618 (all editions) published by:
1. The American Music Conference (AMC), founded in 1947 in Chicago.
2. National Piano Foundation (NPF), the education arm of the Piano Manufacturing Association International (PMAI).
3. National Association of Music Merchants (NAMM).
- Griscti, Verity; Hull, Joshua (eds.). Biographical Dictionary of Architects in Canada: 1800–1950. "Jackson & Rosencrans".
- Hamersly, Lewis Randolph (1847–1910), ed. (1910). Men and Women of America: A Biographical Dictionary of Contemporaries. Entry → "Fʀᴇᴜɴᴅ, Jᴏʜɴ C" (2nd ed.). New York: L. R. Hamersley & Co. pp. 659–660. LCCN 09-30047; OCLC 2482688 (all editions)
1. Via Google Books (Harvard).
- Hines, George Wilmer "Dixie", Jr. (1872–1928); Hanaford, Harry Prescott (1863–1925), eds. (1914). Entry → "Fʀᴇᴜɴᴅ, Jᴏʜɴ C." Who's Who in Music and Drama – An Encyclopedia of Biography of Notable Men and Women in Music and the Drama. LCCN 14-18082; OCLC 21786350 (all editions), OCLC 5345361 (all editions).
1. Via Google Books (Harvard).
2. Via Google Books (University of Chicago).
- Immigration and Naturalization → New York Supreme Court. In the Matter of Application of Jᴏʜɴ C. Fʀᴇᴜɴᴅ.

Naturalization (archives). Part 1. In the Matter of Application of Jᴏʜɴ C. Fʀᴇᴜɴᴅ.
1. New York, U.S., State and Federal Naturalization Records, 1794–1943 for Jᴏʜɴ C. Fʀᴇᴜɴᴅ, Supreme Court of New York County (230–315), Supreme Court of New York County (232–235).
  1. Archives of the Supreme Court New York Co., Bundle 235, Record no. 3: A–H (digital images 1729–1736 of 1941) – via Ancestry.com
    1. Record No. 3 A–C (November 2, 1903). "Examination of Applicant of Applicant and Witness" (digital images 1730–1732 of 1941). Before Edward Everett McCall (1863–1924), Justice of the New York Supreme Court.
    2. Record No. 3: D (October 17, 1903). Attestation Issued by the New York City Clerk, Patrick Joseph Scully (1855–1921) (File No. 13837. Digital image 1733 of 1941). Attesting that the applicant, Jᴏʜɴ C. Fʀᴇᴜɴᴅ, had complied with the public-notice requirements for Naturalization.
    3. First Papers: Record No. 3: E (October 18, 1892). Sworn Declaration of Intention to Become a Citizen of the United States of America (digital image 1734 of 1941).
      - Declarant: Jᴏʜɴ C. Fʀᴇᴜɴᴅ of the town of Oppenheim, County of Herkimer, State of New York.
      - Jurat: Sworn before N[elson] E. Ransom (1854–1930), Herkimer County Clerk, State of New York, October 18, 1892.
      - Clerk's Certificate Attesting That the Copy Is a True and Correct Copy of the Original by the hand of N.E. Ransom, Herkimer County Clerk, and County Seal affixed, October 18, 1892.

Naturalization (archives). Part 2. In the Matter of Application of Jᴏʜɴ C. Fʀᴇᴜɴᴅ.
1. Record No. 3: F (October 15, 1903). Application: Petition for Naturalization (digital image 1735 of 1941).
  - Jurisdiction: Supreme Court of the State of New York, First Judicial District.
  - Petitioner: Jᴏʜɴ C. Fʀᴇᴜɴᴅ.
  - Submitted: October 15, 1903.
  - Identity of qualified supporting witness that petitioner intends to summon: Leopold Levy, who knows the Petitioner.
  - Subscribed and verified under oath by Jᴏʜɴ C. Fʀᴇᴜɴᴅ to Joseph H. Brown (né Joseph Hallowell Brown; 1844–1918), Commissioner of Deeds (Naturalization Clerk).
2. Record No. 3: G (October 15, 1903). Application Filed October 15, 1903 (Case Binder) (digital image 1736 of 1941).
3. Record No. 3: H (November 2, 1903). Affidavit: Sworn Statement of Witness (digital images 1729–1737 of 1941). Witness: Leopold Levy. James L. McNeirny (1844–1924), Special Deputy to the Clerk of the County of New York in Special Term, Part 2 of the Supreme Court for the transaction of ex parte and naturalization business. McNeirny was a brother of Bishop Francis McNeirny (1828–1894).
4. Applicant arrived in the U.S. September 1871. Witness, Leopold Levy, has been acquainted with applicant since 1895.

- Johnson, Elwin Bird (1865–1928), ed. (1910). Forty Years of the University of Minnesota (PDF). Minneapolis: University of Minnesota, General Alumni Association.
1. 348-page ed. (omits "Biographies," "Faculty Director," "Index"). OCLC 7992557.
  1. Via HathiTrust (Harvard).
2. 639-page ed.. p. 292 (407–408) – via University of Minnesota, University Digital Conservancy (UDC). OCLC 2117426.
  1. pp. 1–321.
  2. pp. 322–639.
    1. "Bɪᴏɢʀᴀᴘʜɪᴇꜱ" – Eɴᴛʀʏ: "Rose, Bert Aaron" (PDF). pp. 407–408.
  3. "Supplementary Index" – via University of Minnesota (7 typed pages). Prepared by Ellen Edmond Hahn (née Ellen Ross Edmond; 1905–1997), a 1927 graduate of the University of Minnesota. 1935.
The 639-page edition, in quarto, is an expanded 1910 edition containing the "Biographies" section (pp. 265–450), including the entry for Bert Aaron Rose. A shorter 348-page edition issued the same year – digitized by HathiTrust, Internet Archive, and Google Books – omits "Biographies," "Alumni Directory," and "Index." A "Supplementary Index" was published in 1930.
- Love, Barbara Joan (1937–2022), ed. (1970). Foremost Women in Communications – A Biographical Reference Work on Accomplished Women in Broadcasting, Publishing, Advertising, Public Relations, and Allied Professions. New York: Foremost Americans Publishing Corporation in association with R.R. Bowker Company. p. 223. LCCN 79-125936; ISBN 978-0-8352-0414-9, 0-8352-0414-6; OCLC 105233 (all editions).
1. Via Internet Archive (Stephens College; withdrawn).
- Mathews (1837–1912), William Smythe Babcock (1837–1912) [at Wikidata], ed. (1889). A Hundred Years of Music in America – An Account of Musical Effort in America During the Past Century, Including Popular Music and Singing Schools, Church Music, Musical Conventions and Festivals, Orchestral, Operatic and Oratorio Music; Improvements in Musical Instruments; Popular and the Higher Musical Education; Creative Activity, and the Beginning of a National School of Musical Composition. Chicago: G. L. Howe (Granville Lewis Howe; 1840–1921) (publisher). W.B. Conkey (Walter Blakesley Conkey; 1858–1923) (printer). LCCN 06-32339; OCLC 862556 (all editions).
1. Chapter 16: "Literary Factors in Musical Progress" → "Musical Journalism" → Entry → "William M. Thoms". pp. 380–382.
  1. Via Internet Archive (University of Connecticut).
- Michigan Alumnus (The) (November 24, 1934). "In Memorandum" → "Edwin John Rosencrans, '93, C.E., '00". Vol. 41, no. 8. p. 128 – via Google Books.
- Mott, Frank Luther (1938). A History of American Magazines, 1865–1885 (5 Vols.). Belknap Press, an imprint of the Harvard University Press. OCLC 310244 (all editions)
1. Volume III: "1865–1885". Chapter 8 – "Music, The Theater, and Sports" → "Music Journals". pp. 196–197.
  1. Via Google Books (Harvard; limited preview).
  2. Via Internet Archive (Wingate University).
Main article about this source: A History of American Magazines.
- Music: A Monthly Magazine; Mathews, William Smythe Babcock (1837–1912) [at Wikidata] (March 1895). "Editorial Bric-a-Brac" (re: Music Journalism). Vol. 7, no. 5. Chicago (Auditorium Tower): Music Magazine Publishing Company. p. 525. ISSN 2993-5539, ISSN 2993-5547; OCLC 4102718 (all editions).
"Bric-a-Brac" was the monthly column of W.S.B. Mathews, which, in the vernacular of the day, meant "editorial odds and ends."
1. Via Google Books (University of Michigan).
- Music Trade Review (The) – via Museum of the Game, International Arcade Museum Library.
See The Music Trade Review
1. "Congratulations to Mr. Weil" (PDF) (weekly). Vol. 28, no. 17. April 29, 1899. p. 15 (column 3, bottom).
2. Oʙɪᴛᴜᴀʀɪᴇꜱ: "William J. Dougherty Dies After Long Illness" (PDF) (monthly). Vol. 110, no. 2. February 1951. p. 30 (column 1).
- Music Trades (The) (archives). LCCN sf79-10154 (catalog record), LCCN sf86-92072 (microfilm); ISSN 0027-4488; OCLC 1640823 (all editions).
1. Pᴇᴏᴘʟᴇ: "Grace Frary Retires From The Music Trades". Vol. 155, no. 5. June 2007. p. 114.
2. Eᴅɪᴛᴏʀᴀʟ: "120 Years of Industry Coverage". Vol. 158, no. 10. By Brian T. Majeski, Editor and Paul A. Majeski, Publisher. November 2010. p. 20.
3. Tʀɪʙᴜᴛᴇ: "John F. Majeski [Longtime Music Trades Editor] (1921–2011)" (PDF). Vol. 160, no. 1. February 2011. pp. 22–24. Archived from the original on February 2, 2017.
- Musical Alliance of the United States (archived homepage). Archived from the original on February 15, 2025 – via Wayback Machine.
- Musical America; Yockey, Ross Paul (1943–2008) (October 1978). And Now We Are 80 (Musical America Looks Back [Over Eight Adventurous Decades])". Vol. 28, no. 10. p. 4. LCCN sn78-6282, LCCN sc83-7484; ISSN 0018-1463; OCLC 2336463 (all editions).
- Music Supervisors' Journal; Freund, John C. (January 1918). "The Musical Alliance". Vol. 4, no. 3. National Conference of Music Supervisors. pp. 22, 24, 26, 28.; LCCN 88-662966, LCCN sf86-92115, LCCN sn94-91993; ISSN 1559-2472 (publication); OCLC 1776618 (all editions) (publication), OCLC 9982307546 (article).
1. Via JSTOR 3382937
2. Via HathiTrust (University of Michigan).
3. Via Internet Archive (SIM (Serials in Microfilm) Box ID: IA1641815, canister no. 03). IA Collection: SIM Microfilm; Periodicals; Pub: Music Educators Journal.
- NAMM (January 13, 2003). "John Majeski, Jr." (interview; video). NAMM Oral History Library. Archived from the original on March 31, 2012.
- New York Evening Post (July 8, 1927). "The Advertiser": "'Super Business-Paper' Combine Well Under Way With Big Stock Issue Sold – Hearst Men Head Group — England and U.S. Hook Up". Vol. 126, no. 197. p. 18 (column 4, lower half). LCCN sn83-30386; OCLC 9517291 (all editions).
1. Via Fultonhistory.com (PDF). Archived (PDF) from the original on November 12, 2025.
2. Via NYS Historic Newspapers.
- New York Times (The). LCCN sn78-4456, LCCN sn00-61556; ISSN 0362-4331, ISSN 1553-8095 (online); OCLC 1645522 (all editions).
1. "John C. Freund – Founder and Editor of Musical America Dies After Long Illness". Vol. 73, whole no. 24238. June 4, 1924. p. 21 (column 5, top). Retrieved December 13, 2019
  1. NYTimes Archives → Blog.
  2. TimesMachine → Pdf (PDF); Permalink.
  3. Via Internet Archive (SIM Box ID IA1661909 & Canister no. 03). IA Collection: SIM Microfilm; Periodicals; Pub New York Times.
2. "Six Magazines Auctioned – Trade Publications, Inc., Sale Brings $323,920". Vol. 78, whole no. 26110. July 20, 1929. p. 8 (column 6, lower half). ($323,900 is roughly equivalent to $6,073,500 in 2025). Retrieved December 13, 2019.
  1. NYTimes Archives → Blog.
  2. TimesMachine → Pdf (PDF); Permalink (digital image 15).
  3. Via Internet Archive (SIM Box ID IA1661909 & Canister no. 03). IA Collection: SIM Microfilm; Periodicals; Pub New York Times.
3. "John Majeski Sr., Publisher, Dead – Owned Musical America and Music Trades Magazines". Vol. 121, whole no. 41574. November 21, 1971. p. 84 (column 6, top). Retrieved December 13, 2019
  1. NYTimes Archives → Blog.
  2. TimesMachine → Pdf (PDF); Permalink.
- Notes; Milligan, Stuart [Charles] (born 1940) (June 1973). "Music and Other Performing Arts Serials Available in Microform and Reprint Editions". Second Series. Vol. 29, no. 4. Music Library Association. pp. 239–307. JSTOR 939494; ISSN 0027-4380 (journal); OCLC 9984267316 (article).
Milligan was, at the time of publication, Circulation Librarian and Microform Specialist at the Sibley Music Library, Eastman School of Music, University of Rochester, and Chair of the Microforms Committee of the Music Library Association.
- Greene, Stephen Robert, PhD (1954–2025) (January 31, 2014). "Allied in Music: One Man's Dream of Unity". OnBeing.org. Archived from the original on September 4, 2014.
- Philadelphia Inquirer, The (June 17, 1927). "Large New Security Offerings Announced". → "Trade Publications, Inc". Vol. 196, no. 168. p. 24 (columns 1 & 2, middle).
1. Via Fultonhistory.com (PDF). Archived (PDF) from the original on September 11, 2025.
2. Via Newspapers.com.
- Poughkeepsie Eagle-News (March 5, 1930). "Daugherty is Made Trade Paper Editor" (PDF). p. 1 (column 3, bottom) – via Fultonhistory.com.
- Presto-Times (August 1, 1928). Abbott, Frank Danford (1853–1944) [in German] (ed.). "Music Trades Sold at Auction". "The American Music Trade Journal". Vol. 45, no. 2232. Chicago. p. 8 (column 1, bottom). OCLC 29805477 (all editions).
1. Online via International Arcade Museum (International Arcade Museum Library (IAML), Pasadena, Museum of the Game).
2. Pdf via International Arcade Museum (PDF) (IAML).
- Spillane, Daniel (1860–1893) (1890). History of the American Pianoforte: Its Technical Development, and the Trade. New York: D. Spillane (publisher). p. 359. LCCN 06-6308; OCLC 21361 (all editions).
1. Via Google Books (University of Michigan).
- Syracuse Journal (May 23, 1935). "Wife Dead, Mate Near Death in Suicide Pact" (PDF) (INS). Vol. 92, no. 122. p. 19 (column 3, middle) – via Fultonhistory.com.
- Trademark: The Music Trades (Serial No. 85046105; Registration No. 3910654). Trademark Status & Document Retrieval, U.S. Patent and Trademark Office. January 25, 2011 [registration date].

Status:
Cancelled
Dead
Status date: February 7, 2009.

- Who Was Who in America → Entry → "Majeski, John F". Vol. 5: "1969–1973". Chicago: Marquis Who's Who. 1973. p. 454. LCCN 43-3789; ISSN 0146-8081; ISBN 978-0-8379-0205-0, 0-8379-0205-3; OCLC 13864526 (all editions), OCLC 1713564 (all editions).
1. Via Internet Archive (Kahle/Austin Foundation).
