= Amelia Freund =

American inventor, editor

- Born: Amelia Louisa Rüdiger c. 1824; Prussia
- Died: 17 March 1888; Whitestone, Queens, New York
- Other names: Amelia Lewis
- Spouse: Jonas Charles Hermann Freund
- Children: eight

Amelia Freund née Rüdiger or Amelia Lewis (1824 – 17 March 1888) was a Prussian-born inventor, editor and a campaigner for socialism and women's equality.

== Life ==
Freund was born in Prussia in 1824 or 1825. She married Dr Jonas Charles Hermann Freund on 18 March 1846, in London, who was Karl Marx's doctor. They had eight children and after they were born Feund became active in feminist societies.

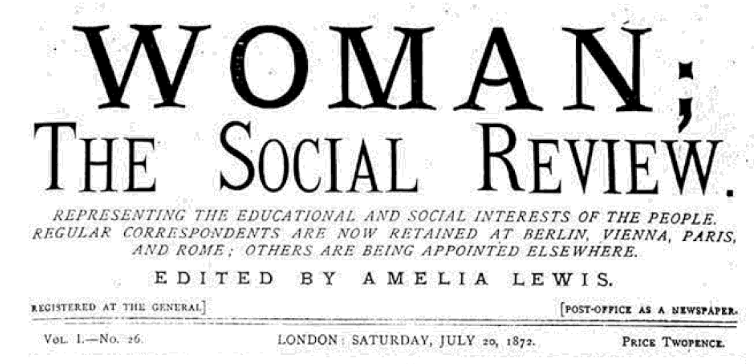
Woman-The Social Review - 20 July 1872 edition

In 1872 she launched her first magazine "Woman: The Social Review" with herself as editor under the pen name Amelia Lewis. Despite changing the name to the "Social Review" in the same year the magazine ended having stated its positive views on educational and gender equality and the reform of labour laws. She launched a similar journal, "Women's Opinion" in 1874 but again within months it had gone from a weekly, to a monthly and then ceased to exist. The magazine had intended to not let "one sex answer for the other". Freund was taking an interest in food and her improved stove was shown at the Inventor's Institute. Her "People's Stove" was intended to save fuel and to burn straw or peat. Her patented stove contained a "frizzler" which fried without hardening.

In 1876 she launched the "National Food and Fuel Reformer" weekly journal and this continued to be printed until 1876, when she launched in parallel her journal "The Housekeeper: A Domestic Journal". Meanwhile, her stove won a prize at the 1875 Paris Exhibition. The stove could be used as an alternative to a grate using a quarter or a third of the fuel. It was claimed to cook and heat the room. In 1879 she again launched a journal this time titled. "Food and Health Leaves" and this lasted eight months. This was her last journal launch.

Her son, John Christian Freund, launched a magazine titled "The Deep Blue" in 1871 and this attracted leading socialist writers and his mother. Her son's lack of success caused him to emigrate to the United States in 1873 and after her husband died Freund followed in 1879. Freund was mentioned in New York Times in 1881 but no further information is available.
