= The Talking Machine World =

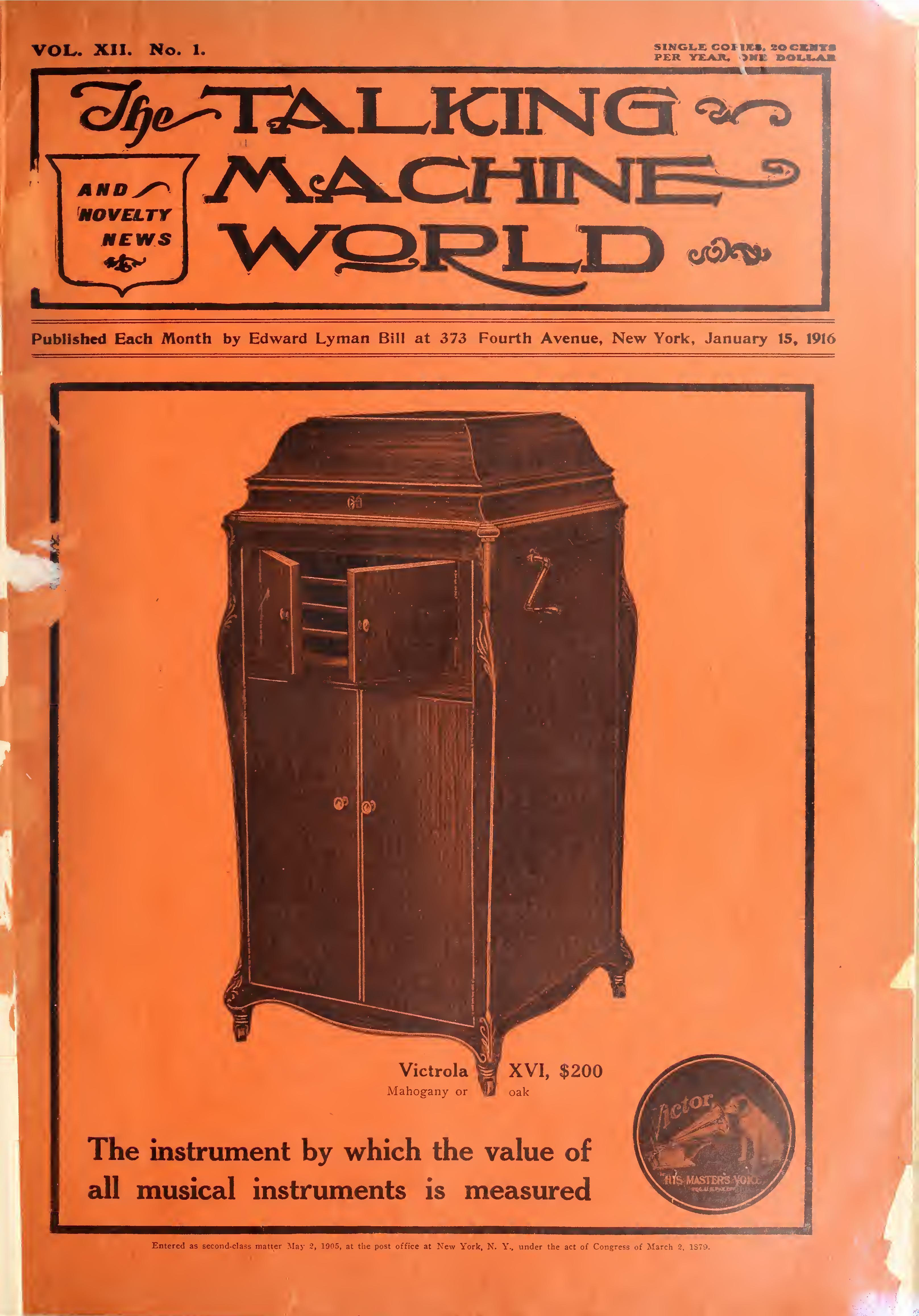
Cover page for the January 15, 1916 edition

The Talking Machine World was a monthly magazine published in New York City between 1905 and 1928. During that time it was the main trade magazine dealing with phonographs and early sound recordings, including cylinders and discs. In later years it also covered radio products, and during its final year of publication was renamed Talking Machine World and Radio Music Merchant.

The magazine was founded and edited by "Colonel" Edward Lyman Bill (1862–1916), who had been editor of another magazine, The Music Trade Review. Each monthly issue of Talking Machine World had sections on developments in different regions of the United States, together with Canada and the United Kingdom. These included some information on sales in different areas, on new innovations, and on the activities of recording artists. The magazine also featured a wide variety of advertisements for phonographs, other equipment, and new record releases. Issues from 1916 averaged about 100 pages, but by 1920, as the recording industry expanded, issues were routinely over 200 pages in length.

After Bill's death, the magazine was edited by his son, Raymond Bill. The journal seems not to have been published after 1928. Its reports on recording sales were superseded and developed by those in Variety, and later Billboard and Cash Box.
