= TTJ =

TTJ or ttj may refer to:

- Timber Trades Journal, a British trade magazine for the timber industry
- TTJ, the IATA code for Tottori Airport, Japan
- ttj, the ISO 639-3 code for Tooro language, Uganda
