= Freundel =

Freundel, Freundl may refer to:

- Freundel Stuart (born c. 1949), Prime Minister of Barbados
- Barry Freundel, American rabbi convicted of voyeurism

== Freundl ==
- Carola Freundl was the married name of Carola Bluhm (born 1962, Berlin), a German politician (Die Linke). However, following the break up of her marriage she announced in 2005 that she was reverting to using her maiden name.

== See also ==
- Freund
- Freundlich
- Freud
