= HJI =

HJI may refer to:

- Hairdressers Journal International
- Haji language, spoken on Sumatra
- Harkat-ul-Jihad al-Islami
