= Michael Freund =

Michael Freund may refer to:

- Michael Freund (historian) (1902–1972), German historian and professor at the University of Kiel
- Michael Freund (activist), founder and chairman of the Jewish organization Shavei Israel
