= Freunde =

Freunde may refer to:

- Freunde (song), a song by Die Toten Hosen
- Freunde (TV series), a German television series

== See also ==
- Friends (disambiguation)
