= Martinus Sieveking =

Dutch virtuoso pianist, composer, teacher and inventor

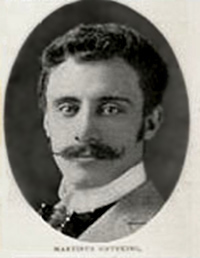
Martinus Sieveking in 1897 at the peak of his career.

Martinus Sieveking (March 24, 1867 – November 26, 1950) was a Dutch virtuoso pianist, composer, teacher and inventor born in Amsterdam. Also known as Martin Sieveking, he performed as a soloist around Europe] and the United States during his active career and taught in France and the U.S. after he retired from performing. He is sometimes referred to as The Flying Dutchman due to his Dutch heritage and extremely flighty nature. At the peak of his career, he was pronounced by the New York and Boston critics as one of the four greatest living pianists of that time along with Ignace Paderewski, Moriz Rosenthal and Rafael Joseffy.

Sieveking was an advocate of The Dead-Weight Principle of playing. He devised his own variation of this system and wrote several articles about the subject for publication. He was also an inventor of both musical and non-musical devices that he had patented in various countries.

== Early life ==
Sieveking came from an old and aristocratic family, which dated its ancestry back to the fifteenth century. He grew up in a musical atmosphere, as his mother Johanna De Jong was a well-known opera singer and his father, also named Martinus, was a trained musician, choral conductor and a composer with published works in the Netherlands. He was the second in a family of four; his older sibling was named Johanna like his mother, and Martinus was followed by Charles, then Rosa.

From his early childhood he showed characteristics indicative of being a great musician. His father gave Martinus his first piano lessons at an early age and continued to do so until he was ten. In addition to playing piano Martinus also started composing at an early age and played the organ in a church by age twelve. Eventually his family sent him to the Leipzig Conservatory. At the conservatory, he studied piano for eight years under Julius Röntgen, a famous German-Dutch pianist-composer, and spent six years of musical education in composition and orchestration, under Franz Coenen in the Netherlands.

== Musical career ==
Sieveking's signature

His first international appearance was in Paris in 1888 when, at the age of twenty-one, he heard his own composition, a suite for orchestra, played by the Lamoureux Orchestra. He resided in Paris in 1889 and became one of the number of Dutch musicians that were based in the city.

He visited England in 1890 upon the suggestion of his uncle, Sir Edward Henry Sieveking, who was well known in London and was one of the physicians of Queen Victoria. He had success with two tours with Edward Lloyd, the British tenor, and David Popper, the cellist. He also made two tours as the accompanist to the Italian opera singer Adelina Patti during her tour of the United Kingdom between 1891 and 1892. He became one of the artists sponsored by the Mason & Hamlin piano manufacturer in 1892.

=== Tour with Sandow, 1893 ===
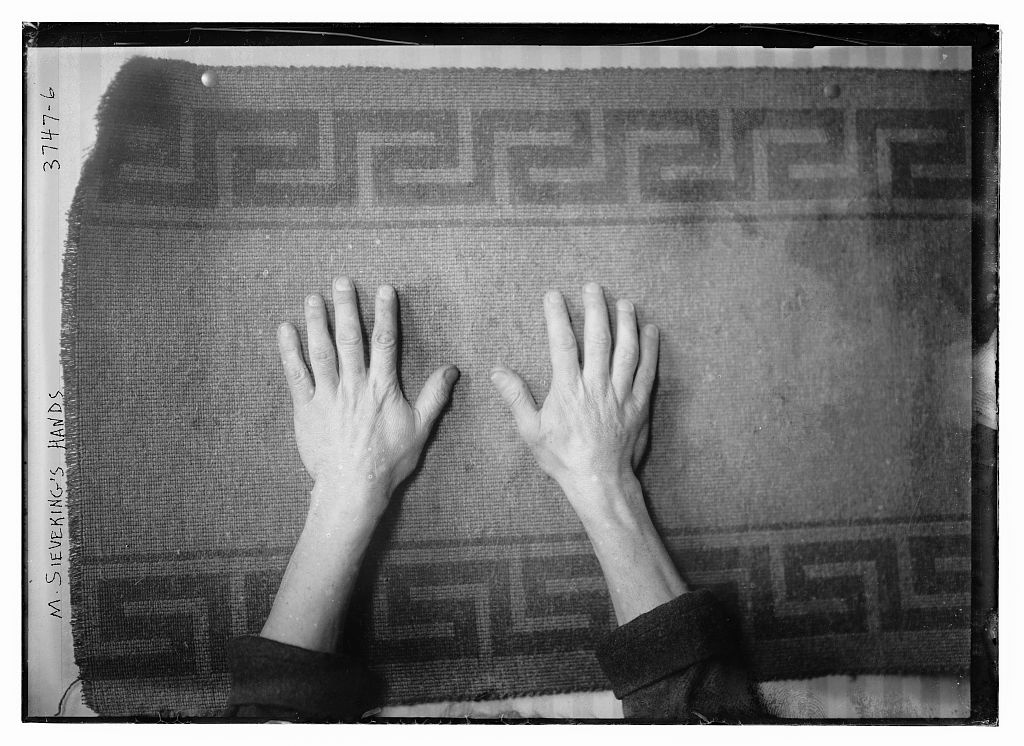
The hands of Martinus Sieveking, c. 1915

On June 6, 1893, he came to the United States aboard the SS Elbe. He arrived in New York City with his friend, the famous physical culturist and bodybuilder Eugen Sandow, as his accompanist for his stage performances. Sandow had met Sieveking years before during his tour of Belgium and the Netherlands. According to Sandow, Sieveking was a brilliant artist, but as a man he was a weakling. He had no powers of endurance, and it was difficult for him to remain at the piano for a long time. Upon Sandow's suggestion, Sieveking became a pupil and his guest while in America. Martinus wrote music and conducted for Sandow's vaudeville acts, when he toured New York City, Boston, and at the World's Columbian Exposition in Chicago.

=== Lincoln, Nebraska, 1893–95 ===
Following his stint with Sandow in 1893, he stayed and established himself in Chicago as a private piano teacher, but the city was overrun with piano teachers. Around this time Willard Kimball, the former head of the Iowa Conservatory of Music (now Grinell College), was about to open a music conservatory in Lincoln, Nebraska in connection with the University of Nebraska. He was in search of a first-class piano teacher and was referred to Sieveking. Coincidentally Sieveking was low in funds and generally "down on his luck." Kimball offered him $6,000 a year, with various perquisites, and the desperate young man recklessly signed a three-year contract without even stopping to investigate the position. Sieveking started teaching in the latter part of 1893 at the university's School of Music in Lincoln, Nebraska, which then became the Conservatory of Music in 1894.

The practical, bustling west proved a prison of the dreariest description to the artist. Only the women there have time to study music, he thought. Of these, he found that few had any talent, and the eccentric, temperamental pianist frankly told them so whenever he felt inclined to do so. His nerves began to break down. His activities in Lincoln began attracting the bemused attention of the local press. In the spring of 1895, Sieveking was booked for a concert tour of the principal cities of the east and left Lincoln on April 16, but not leaving the town quietly. It was reported that at the morning of his departure his dog, named Tad, got into trouble with a policeman. Sieveking laid the policeman flat on his back, and when the two officers fell upon him, he handled them in exactly the same way. Consequently, he rode to his train in a patrol wagon.

After his departure from Lincoln, he made his successful debut in Boston with the Boston Festival Orchestra. He also appeared with this orchestra conducted by Emil Mollenhauer at the "Second May Festival Concert" of the University Musical Society at the University Hall of the University of Michigan in Ann Arbor, Michigan, on May 18, 1895, where he played the Piano Concerto in G Minor by Camille Saint-Saëns.

He was scheduled to return to Lincoln on September 1 of that year to resume his duties in connection with the conservatory, but Sieveking never returned to the school and returned to Europe instead, breaking his contract.

=== American tour, 1895 and 1896–97 ===
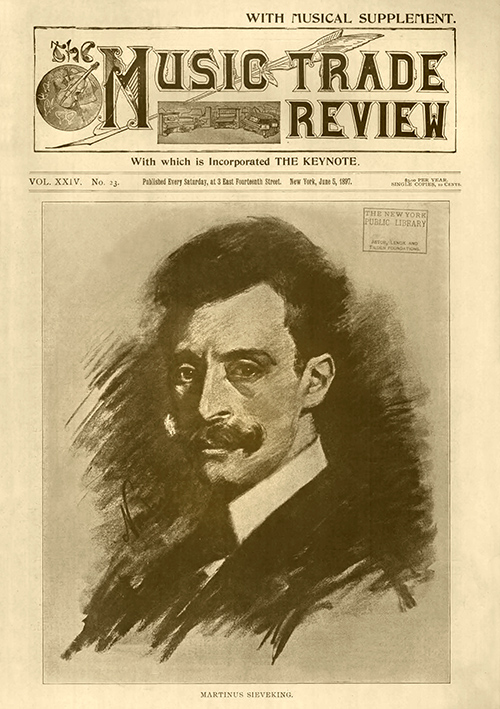
A sketch of Martinus Sieveking by Leonardus Nardus on the cover of The Music Trade Review magazine, June 5, 1897, published in New York City

He returned to the United States for a brief concert tour in the winter of 1895, arriving in New York City on October 21, 1895, aboard the La Champagne departing from Havre, Norway. He gave a celebrated concert in Boston with the Boston Symphony Orchestra on December 7, 1895, where he played again Saint-Saëns Piano Concerto No. 2. His reception amounted to an ovation. Enthusiasm run to such a height that at the first concert, the pianist had seven recalls, and at the second, eight.

Following this success he returned in the fall of 1896 with four consecutive performances on October 21, 23, 24 and 28 with the Boston Symphony Orchestra. Among the other cities he performed in was Cumberland, Maryland on November 11, 1896, at the Saints Peter and Paul Church. He gave a solo piano recital at Carnegie Hall, New York City, on December 8, 1896, followed by a performance in Atlanta, Georgia, at the Grand Opera House on December 17 with violinist Maud Powell.

On February 8, 1897, he performed in Columbus, Ohio, at the newly built Southern Fireproof Theater with local soprano Lillian Miller. He gave a solo piano recital at the Academy of Music in Allentown, Pennsylvania, on March 2, 1897, and again on November 18, 1897. He was managed for his American tour by music impresario Victor Thrane of Chicago.

=== Vienna, 1898 ===
After completing his tour of the U.S. Sieveking felt unsatisfied with his latest performances and felt that he still needed to improve. He traveled to Vienna, Austria, the following year and sought the help of Theodor Leschetizky regarding his repertoire. The professor took a great interest in him and out of a class of ninety, he became one of his six favorites. The other five were Mark Hambourg, Ossip Gabrilowitsch, Katharine Goodson, Artur Schnabel and Ethel Newcomb. Leschetizky preferred pianists with large hands and strong muscles at the piano, which Sieveking had. According to Leschetizky, playing the piano was similar to playing a percussion instrument.

During this time Sieveking seemed to have a hard time staying out of trouble. He was arrested at Ischl in September 1898 for refusing to take off his hat while a Catholic priest, who was carrying a cross, was passing. Sieveking stated that he was a Protestant, and, as a foreigner, had no idea that his neglecting to remove his hat would be regarded by the local Catholics as an insult to their religion. He was also mobbed by a crowd, while the priest egged his assailants on by calling him names. Consequently, Sieveking was sentenced to three days imprisonment.

Sieveking also met a younger woman in Austria named Therese (born April 13, 1881) who later became his wife. The couple were married in Dover, Kent, England, in June, 1899. A daughter was born to the couple in Vienna on October 15, 1900, named Senta Therese Sieveking.

=== American tour, 1900–01 ===
After canceling an American tour scheduled for 1899 he did return to the US in the middle of October 1900 for another tour in the winter of 1900–1901. Some of his engagements included a performance at Washington, D.C., where he played the American premiere of the Piano Concerto No. 1 by Rachmaninoff on December 16, 1900. He gave a piano recital at the Vassar College in Poughkeepsie, New York on January 9, 1901.

=== Return to France ===
Martinus, his wife, and his daughter returned to France sometime in the following years. They had a son, Leonard, born in 1905 in St. Brio, France. (Note: possibly Saint-Brieuc in northwestern France)

After concertizing all over Europe and America, Sieveking was still not satisfied with the success he had achieved. In pursuit of the deeper principles of true piano technique underlying his art which had not yet understand, he spent the next fifteen years of his life formulating what he called the Dead-Weight principle. The system, which was similar to Leschetizky, William Mason, and Rudolf Breithaupt's methods, calls for a very relaxed arm with the weight of the arm and hand supported by each finger on the piano key. Sieveking's method, though, calls for a strong, articulated finger, each finger developed and strengthen independently. According to Sieveking, the result is increase in volume and better control of touch at a shorter amount of time.

While perfecting his technique method, he retired from performing and taught in France. Many of his talented students won the Premier Prix in Paris. He was known to teach those with talent even if they were unable to pay. He also used this time to both compose and transcribe music for the piano; he transcribed Chopin's music for a young Olga Rudge for her recitals. Rudge was an American-born violinist who grew up in Paris whose mother was a close friend of the pianist. Sieveking, as remembered by Rudge, was a collector of timepieces with several dozen clocks at his apartment, chiming to different rhythms.

After five years of retirement, he came out in 1907 for a concert in Berlin.

=== Return to America ===
With the purpose of teaching and spreading the system he developed, he returned to America arriving in New York City on January 30, 1916, aboard the SS Rotterdam departing from Rotterdam. His plan included concertizing, composing and publishing his works in the United States. His original intention was to return to Paris after accomplishing his mission in the US.

His daughter Senta Therese eventually followed him to the United States arriving in New York on April 29, 1918. Martinus's wife Therese and then 13-year-old son Leonard followed arriving in New York City on June 23, 1918, aboard the S.S. Chicago from Bordeaux, France. Martinus is reported to have founded a piano school in New York for advanced-level pianists, but by the mid-1920s to the early 1930s, he was teaching at the New York Institute of Musical Art (which later became the Juilliard School of Music) as a piano professor.

== Inventor ==
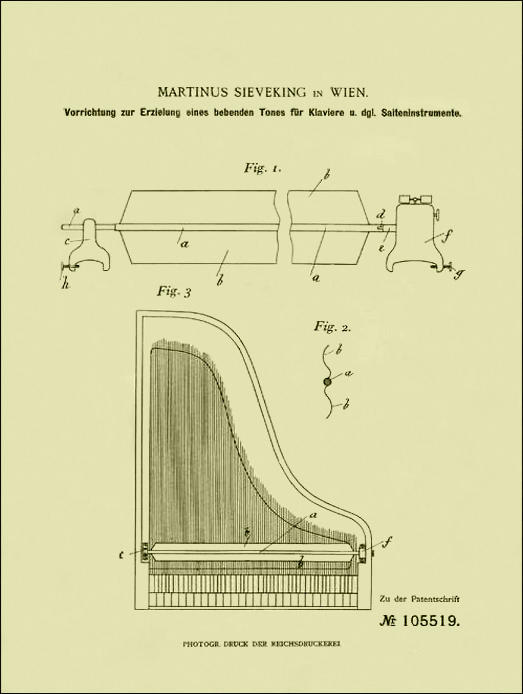
The vibrating device invented by Sieveking and patented in Austria in 1898

Sieveking was an imaginative thinker and mechanically adept. Besides teaching, he also devoted his time inventing apparatuses and mechanical appliances of various kinds with some submitted for patent. He also invented and devised his own improvements for the piano. Sieveking invented a mechanical device for the piano to produce a peculiar vibration in the sound or notes of the instrument. While in Austria, he had the apparatus patented in the country on March 6, 1898 (No. 105,519). It was also filed for patent in Canada on August 26, 1898. In the 1930s, he improved and patented a piano-action spring (Patent No. 2,046,853 filed on July 5, 1935), which he improved two years later (No. 2,138,517 files on March 18, 1937). He even had a piano built especially for him that had wider keys and a sloped down lower octave so that his arms could utilize gravity to produce a larger sound.

He had a vast mechanical and electrical knowledge. Sieveking invented a type of an internal combustion engine, patented in the U.S. on August 14, 1917 (No. 1,252,045) and in Canada on March 15, 1918. While teaching at the New York Institute of Musical Art, he spent the summer of 1926 improving the radio of the school, getting purer production sound and greater volume from a one-tube set.

Among the other assorted collection of devices he invented and patented are: an electric motor-driven traffic signal (No. 2,135,851 filed on August 16, 1937) and mechanical mobile bird figures for Flying Eagle Co., a corporation in New York - (No. 1,419,694 filed on April 13, 1921) and (No. 1,322,364 filed on January 27, 1919)

== Later life ==
By the 1930s, Martinus and his wife Therese were still married but living apart as she was working as a governess for a wealthy family till the early 1940s. Their daughter Senta, who also had worked as a governess in New York, moved to California. By 1940, she was working at the household of actress Joan Crawford in Bel Air, Los Angeles. She married James Joseph Vincent on June 19, 1940, in Hollywood, Los Angeles.

Martinus became an American citizen on June 2, 1941, at the age of 74 in New York. Therese moved to California in the 1940s, later followed by Martinus.

Sieveking died on November 26, 1950, in Pasadena, California, at the age of 83. He was buried at the Mountain View Mortuary and Cemetery in Altadena, California. Therese later died in Los Angeles, California, on July 12, 1961, at the age of 80. There is no record of Leonard Sieveking after the 1920 census. Senta T. Vincent died on September 6, 2000, in Los Angeles at the age of 100.

== Physical characteristics ==
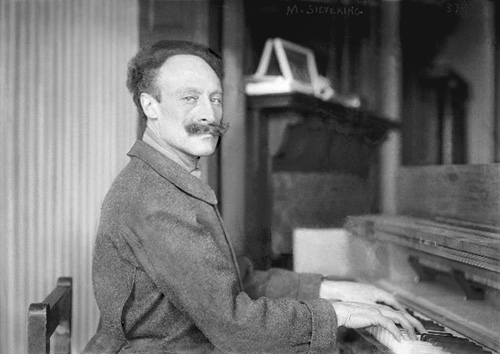
Martinus Sieveking in his later years, on his oversize piano

While training with Eugen Sandow, Sieveking developed an impressive physique. His improvement after three months of training, with light then heavy weight dumbbells, were mentioned in one of Sandow's books as: Height, 5 feet 11 inches (1.80 m); (Note: Another article reported that Sieveking's height was over six feet, contradicting Sandow's measurement, but would proportionally match his reach of 12 notes like Rachmaninoff, who is over 6 feet in height.) Weight, 175 pounds (79 kg), an increase of 15 pounds (6.8 kg); Neck, 18 inches (46 cm); Chest, 43 inches (110 cm), an increase of 3 inches (7.6 cm); Chest expansion, 7.5 inches (19 cm), an increase of 3.5 inches (8.9 cm); Biceps, 16.25 inches (41.3 cm), an increase of 2 inches (5.1 cm); Forearm, 15 inches (38 cm), an increase of 1.5 inches (3.8 cm); Waist, 26 inches (66 cm), a reduction of 3 inches (7.6 cm); Thigh, 23 inches (58 cm), an increase of 2 inches (5.1 cm); Calf, 16 inches (41 cm), an increase of 1.5 inches (3.8 cm). After Sandow, he continued his dedication to physical training while in Lincoln, Nebraska where he was known as a cyclist. He converted the house he was renting into a gymnasium, ruining its furniture and walls.

His physique was later described by Russian pianist Mark Hambourg, another student of Leschetizky, as "more of a house than a man", his hands matching his frame. Sieveking had large muscular hands with a reach of 12 notes, similar in reach to Sergei Rachmaninoff's. His hands were so large that he found it hard to play on ordinary sized keyboard, since his fingers got stuck in between the black keys. He had two pianos in his home in New York, a regular piano and a specially made French piano with wider keys. The whole keyboard was also tilted downward at the back, which he explained was a decided advantage. For his return concert in Berlin in 1907, Steinway built him a customized piano with the keys proportionally enlarged, making the entire keyboard about one foot longer than the standard keyboard. The keyboard was also slanted like his home piano.

== Music ==
Though some of his many compositions are best described as salon music, Sieveking also wrote inventive serious works that are infused with powerful rhythm. A volume of his early compositions was published by G. Schirmer Inc. in 1897. He also transcribed some keyboard music of Johann Sebastian Bach and Chopin for violin and cello. As of 2012, his music is out-of-print, only available from libraries. Some of his more well-known compositions are:

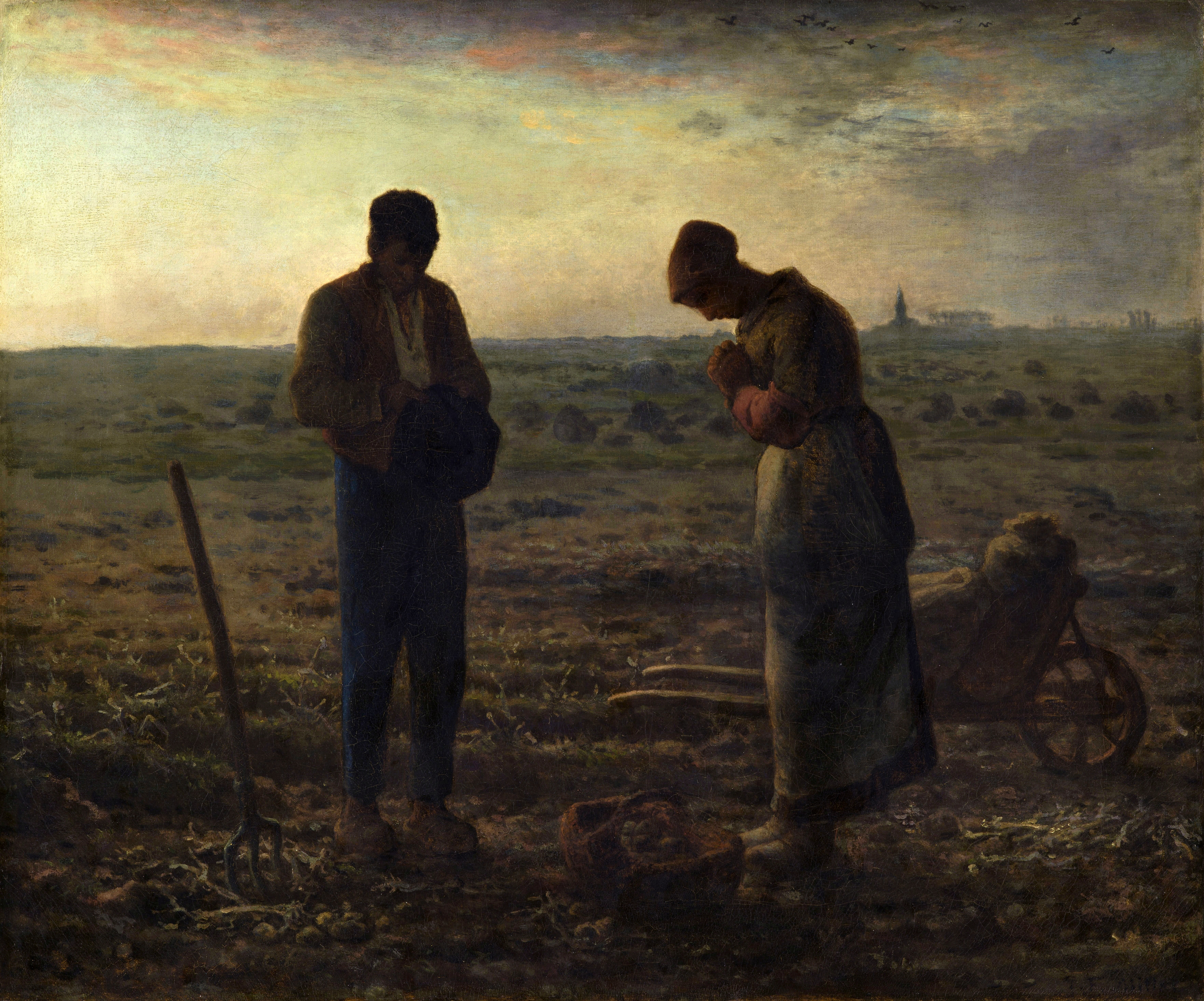
The Angelus by Jean-François Millet

- Angelus, La, the composer's impression of Jean-François Millet's famous painting The Angelus.
- Abille, La (The Bee)
- Berceuse
- Cornemuse
- Dream of the Flowers
- Etude de Concert, several
- Gavotte, a piano transcription of Bach's Gavotte for violin
- Introduction et Valse Lente, Op. 10
- Minuet
- Nocturne
- Pastorale, a pastoral study of forest sounds
- Piano Concerto in C-sharp minor (1894).
- Praeludium, a piano transcription of a Bach prelude
- Prélude et Marche triomphale, performed by the Lamoureux Orchestra on March 15, 1891
- Serenata Espangola for violin and piano
- Sketch
- Souffrance was written when his son was very ill, expresses a father's anxiety for his stricken son.
- Tricoteuse, La - Etude
- Valse Capriccio
- Valse de Concert
- Variations et Fugue
- Wooing, The, a song composed by Sieveking

== Recordings ==
It is not known if any analog recordings of Sieveking's performances exist. Based on the resources of the Reproducing Piano Roll Foundation, Sieveking did not record for the reproducing piano either.

== Other media ==
- Martinus Sieveking, the concert pianist, has a cameo appearance in the Prologue of the fictional novel Lost Horizon by English novelist James Hilton published in 1933.

== Notes and references ==
Notes

== Sources ==
- Brower, Hariette (1917). "Piano Mastery: Second Series". Frederick A. Stokes Company, New York.
- Lahee, Henry Charles (1913). "Famous Pianists of To-day and Yesterday, 11th impression". L.C. Page & Company, Boston.
- Library of Congress Copyright Office (1897). "Catalog of Title Entries of Books Etc. July-Dec 1897, Cat. Nos. 314-319", Government Printing Office, Washington.
- Library of Congress Copyright Office (1915). "Catalogue of Copyright entries, Part 3, Vol. 10, Issue 1". Government Printing Office, Washington.
- Sandow, Eugen (1897). "Strength and How to Obtain It". Gale & Polden, Ltd., London.
