= Freund–Heintz House =

Historic house in Ohio, United States

- U.S. National Register of Historic Places
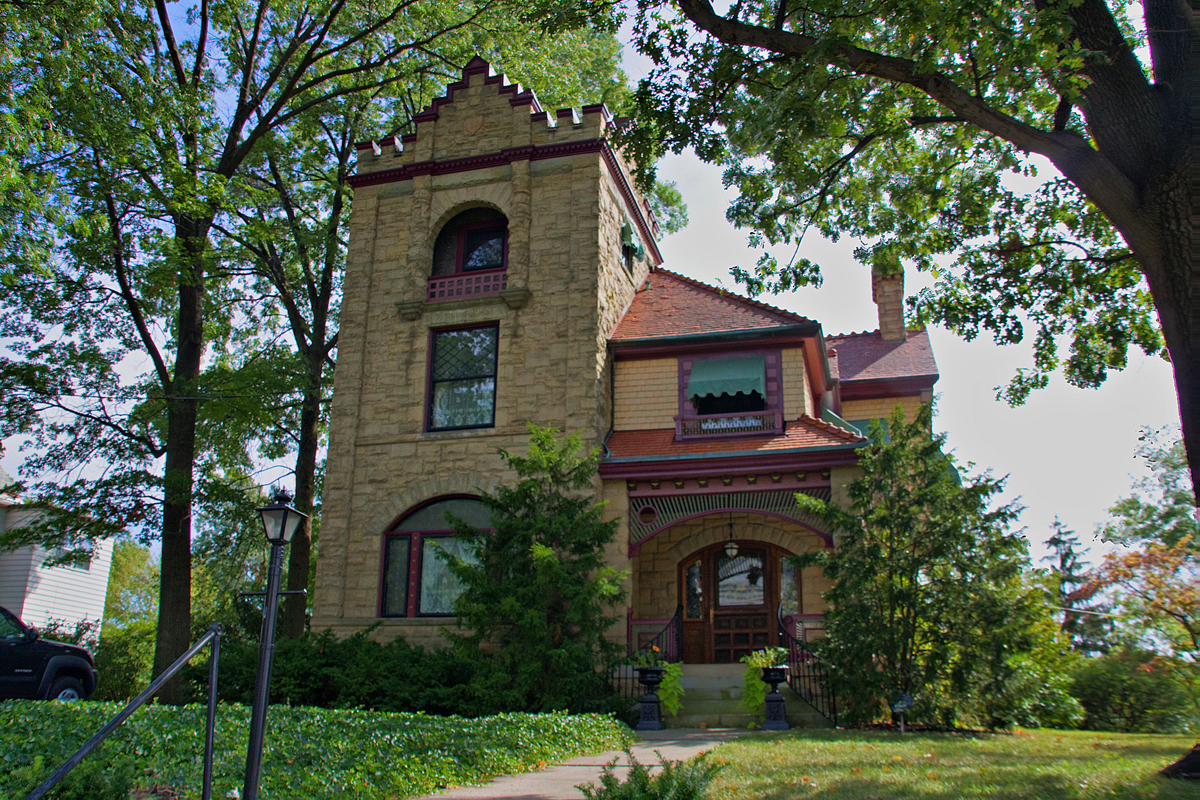
- Location: 3332 Whitfield Avenue, Cincinnati, Ohio
- Coordinates: 39°8′35.16″N 84°31′25.92″W
- Architectural style: Queen Anne
- NRHP reference No.: 03000806
- Added to NRHP: August 21, 2003

The Freund–Heintz House is a registered historic building in Cincinnati, Ohio, listed in the National Register on August 21, 2003.

== Historic uses ==
- Single Dwelling
