= Frank Luther Mott =

American historian and journalist (1886–1964)

Frank Luther Mott (April 4, 1886 – October 23, 1964) was an American academic, historian and journalist, who won the 1939 Pulitzer Prize for History for Volumes II and III of his series, A History of American Magazines.

== Early life and education ==
Mott was born in Rose Hill, Iowa. His parents were Mary E. (Tipton) and David Charles Mott, publishers of the weekly What Cheer, Iowa Patriot. The Mott family owned a print shop in Keokuk County. He was a practicing Quaker. When he was 10 his father began publishing the Audubon, Iowa Republican and he assisted in the typesetting.

He did the first three years of his college education at Simpson College and then completed his bachelor's degree at the University of Chicago. Mott attended Columbia University starting in 1917, earning his M.A. in 1919. Carl Van Doren, mentioned in the Franklin section below, was teaching at Columbia during this time, and the two may have met then. Mott earned his Ph.D. in 1928 from the University of Iowa while a professor there. He married Vera Ingram. His daughter was archaeologist Mildred Mott Wedel.

== Academic career ==
Mott became professor of English at the University of Iowa in 1921, rising to associate professor and of journalism and director of the school of journalism in 1925. He continued at UI until he was appointed Dean of the University of Missouri (MU)'s School of Journalism in 1942.

Mott may have coined the term photojournalism in 1924. He was influential in the development of photojournalism education: the first photojournalism class was taught at UI during his tenure, and the first photojournalism program, directed by Clifton C. Edom, started at MU in 1943 upon his request.

His textbook on American Journalism: A History of Newspapers in the United States through 250 years 1690 to 1940 (1941 and later revised editions covering through 1960) was the standard resource in courses on the history of journalism. In reviewing the book, The New York Times said it is "sure to remain as one of the most valuable and informative resources on the story of our daily press." Mott was the chief of the journalism section of the American Army University of Biarritz and was sent to Japan to advice General MacArthur's staff on magazines and newspapers.

Mott regularly set his students an unexpected challenge: suddenly, midway through a lecture, staging an attempted murder of himself, before assigning his students the challenge of writing up what they had seen happen.

Mott was a lifelong lover of magazines, his father having hoarded them in the house. His monumental series, A History of American Magazines, started as PhD work at Columbia in the late 1920s. It was projected as six volumes. However, other projects, such as American Journalism, derailed his progress. Four volumes of American Magazines carried the history up to 1905. Mott died after starting work on Volume V: 1905–1930. Volume V does not extend the history past 1905; it includes 21 of a projected 36 sketches of individual magazines, intended as supplementary material to the 1905-1930 history. It also includes an index for all five volumes. Presumably, Volume VI would have covered the history from 1931 to Mott's present day, plus additional supplementary materials.

Volumes II and III of A History of American Magazines (1938) won the 1939 Pulitzer Prize for History, and Volume 4 won the Bancroft Prize in 1958.

Mott served as president of Kappa Tau Alpha in 1937–1939. He died in Columbia, Missouri on October 23, 1964.

== Writings on Benjamin Franklin ==
In 1936, Mott collaborated with Chester E. Jorgenson, Instructor in English at the University of Iowa to publish Benjamin Franklin: Representative Selections, With Introduction, Bibliography, and Notes for the American Book Company as part of the American Writers Series.

On April 1, 1937, Carl Van Doren wrote to Mr. Mott:

18 West 13 Street, New York

Dear Mr. Mott: It has just occurred to me that I have never written to you to tell you what an admirable book I think you and Mr. Jorgenson have done in your Franklin. A volume of selections seldom manages to be also a quintessence of scholarship on its subject. Yours does. I am particularly under obligation to you because I am doing a large-scale biography of Franklin, a narrative which will be as dramatic, I hope, as he deserves, and yet will truly embody the recent riches of monographic matters which his earlier biographers have not had to help them. Your volume is my constant handbook, and many of my notes are written in the margins of my copy.

Gratefully, Carl Van Doren

The work in progress became Van Doren's landmark Benjamin Franklin, published in 1938, which won the Pulitzer Prize in 1939.

== Other writings ==
In 1962, Mott published Time Enough, a collection of autobiographical essays. The manuscript and galley proofs for this work are at the State Historical Society of Missouri.

== Works ==
- Interpretations of Journalism: A Book of Readings Edited with Ralph D. Casey, 1937.
- A History of American Magazines, 1741-1850; A History of American Magazines, 1850-1865(1938)
- "Trends in newspaper content." The Annals of the American Academy of Political and Social Science (1942): 60–65. in JSTOR
- "Facetious News Writing, 1833-1883." Mississippi Valley Historical Review (1942): 35–54. in JSTOR
- Jefferson and the Press (Louisiana State University Press, 1943)
- "The Newspaper Coverage of Lexington and Concord." New England Quarterly (1944): 489–505. in JSTOR
- "Newspapers in presidential campaigns." Public Opinion Quarterly 8.3 (1944): 348–367. Online
- Golden Multitudes: The Story of Best Sellers in the United States, 1947.
- The News in America Harvard Univ Press, 1952.
- A History of American Magazines: 1850-1865 Vol. II. Belknap Press of Harvard University Press, 1957.
- A History of American Magazines: 1865-1885 Vol. III. Belknap Press of Harvard University Press, 1957.
- A History of American Magazines: 1885-1905 Vol. IV. Belknap Press of Harvard University Press, 1957.
- The Old Printing Office with John DePol, 1962.
- American Journalism, a History, 1690-1960, 1962.
- Time Enough: Essays in Autobiography, (Greenwood Press) 1962.
- Five Stories, (Prairie Press) 1962.
- Missouri Reader, (University of Missouri Press) 1964.

== Notable students ==
- Marjorie Paxson
- Mort Walker
