= Jonas Charles Hermann Freund =

Jonas Charles Hermann Freund (1808 – 29 December 1879) was an Austrian-British medical doctor, known as the co-founder of the German Hospital in London.

== Career ==
Born to a Jewish family in Bohemia, Freund received a medical degree at the University of Vienna. In London in 1843 he was a co-founder of London's German Hospital, which opened in October 1845. He was Physician in Charge of the hospital until about 1850. The evidence suggests that he was Karl Marx's doctor. Freund was Deputy Inspector-General of Army Hospitals in the Crimean war and an army surgeon.

== Family ==
In London in 1846 he married Prussian-born Louise Amalie Rüdiger, who became a prominent editor and author under the pseudonym "Amelia Lewis". She was an inventor and a campaigner for women's rights. Their son John Christian Freund became a prominent editor and publisher.
