= Freunde (TV series) =

- Country of origin: Germany

Production
- Running time: 20 Minutes

Original release
- Release: 2003 – 2006

Freunde is a German television series.

== See also ==
- List of German television series
