= Maurice Freund =

French businessman and tourism personality (1943–2026)

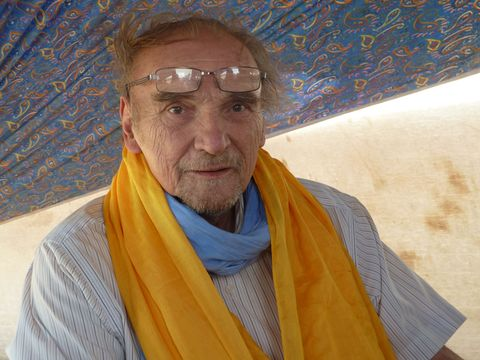
- Freund in 2010
- Born: 13 July 1943; Guebwiller, Gau Baden, Germany
- Died: 9 May 2026 (aged 82); Ardèche, France
- Occupation: Businessman

Maurice Freund (French: [moʁˈis fʁˈœnd]; 15 July 1943 – 9 May 2026) was a French businessman and tourism personality.

Freund often wrote of his travels and of sustainable development, notably developing charters to make air travel more affordable in the 1970s.

== Life and career ==
Born in Guebwiller on 15 July 1943, Freund was the only son of Auguste Freund, a Malgré-nous soldier who was forcefully conscripted into the German armed forces. His father passed away in 1957 just after his Camp 188, so Maurice was raised by his mother, who worked in the potash mines of Alsace. He was expelled from school at 14 and worked for the same mine as his mother until he trained as an electrician. In January 1963, he began his military service before joining the nonprofit Point Mulhouse, which promoted the construction of a youth chalet at Le Markstein. He then began work at a Peugeot factory and joined the French Confederation of Christian Workers. In 1969, Point Mulhouse began to charter flights to destinations such as London, New Delhi, and Naples, which arose his personal interest in aviation. In 1980, he founded Point Air alongside Point Mulhouse, a low-cost airline, which ran flights from Basel/Mulhouse and Marseille to Ouagadougou thanks to Freund's close friendship with President of Burkina Faso Thomas Sankara. The airline went bankrupt in 1987.

Freund died in Ardèche on 9 May 2026, at the age of 82.
