= The Dark Blue =

English literary magazine of the 1870s

The Dark Blue was a London-based literary magazine published monthly from 1871 to 1873 and sold for one shilling per issue.

== Foundation ==
The magazine was founded and edited by John Christian Freund, who was educated at the University of Oxford. The title was based upon a magazine Dark Blue: An Oxford University Magazine, which folded in 1867 after publishing one issue. The Dark Blue was published in London in 1871 by Sampson Low, Son, & Marston and then from 1871 to 1873 by British & Colonial Publishing.

== Literary contributors ==
The Dark Blue published essays, stories, poems, and illustrations. Literary contributors of essays or stories included Mathilde Blind, Sidney Colvin, W. Bodham Donne, W.S. Gilbert, G.A. Henty ("A Pipe of Opium"), Thomas Hughes, Andrew Lang and A.C. Swinburne. There were translations, such as The Story of Frithiof the Bold translated from the Icelandic by William Morris and The Story of Europa translated from the Latin of Horace by J.J. Sylvester. The illustrators included Ford Madox Brown, W.J. Hennessy, Cecil Lawson and Simeon Solomon. The contributors of poetry included Alfred Perceval Graves, Theo Marzials, Arthur O'Shaughnessy, William Michael Rossetti and George A. Simcox.

== Vampire fiction ==
The Dark Blue earned a footnote in the history of vampire fiction by its serial publication of Carmilla by Sheridan Le Fanu.
