= A History of American Magazines =

History book by Frank Luther Mott

- Title page for volume of A History of American Magazines posthumously published in 1968
- Author: Frank Luther Mott
- Language: English
- Genre: Non-fiction
- Publication place: United States

A History of American Magazines is a 5-volume set of nonfiction books by Frank Luther Mott. Volumes II and III of the set won the 1939 Pulitzer Prize for History. The first volume was published in 1930, and the fifth volume was published posthumously in 1968.

Mott laid out the case for studying American periodicals in the introduction to the first volume. He believed that magazines provide three services, including providing democratic literature of high quality, playing an important part in the economics of literature, and furnishing "an invaluable contemporaneous history of their times."

The volumes include:

- A History of American Magazines, Volume I, 1741-1850
- A History of American Magazines, Volume II, 1850-1865
- A History of American Magazines, Volume III, 1865-1885
- A History of American Magazines, Volume IV, 1885-1905
- A History of American Magazines, Volume V: Sketches of 21 Magazines, 1905-1930

Each volume includes sketches of individual magazines.

== Volume I ==
- The American Magazine, or A Monthly View
- The General Magazine
- The American Magazine and Historical Chronicle
- The American Magazine and Monthly Chronicle
- The Royal American Magazine
- The Pennsylvania Magazine
- The Worcester Magazine
- The Columbian Magazine and The Universal Asylum
- The American Museum
- The American Magazine
- The Massachusetts Magazine
- The Christian's, Scholar's, and Farmer's Magazine
- The New-York Magazine
- The Medical Repository
- The Monthly Magazine, and American Review
- The Port Folio
- The Boston Weekly Magazine; The Emerald
- The American Baptist Magazine
- The Monthly Anthology and Boston Review
- The Monthly Register and Review of the United States
- The Panoplist
- The American Mineralogical Journal
- Niles' Weekly Register
- The American Review, and The American Quarterly Review
- The Analectic Magazine, and The Literary Gazette
- Christian Disciple, and Christian Examiner
- The Portico
- The American Monthly Magazine and Critical Review
- The Methodist Review
- The American Journal of Science
- The Eclectic Magazine, and Its Progenitors
- The Christian Spectator
- The Western Review
- The Literary and Scientific Repository
- The Christian Advocate
- The New England Farmer
- The New York Mirror
- The United States Literary Gazette, and The United States Review and Literary Gazette
- The Atlantic Magazine, and The New-York Review, and Atheneum Magazine
- The Biblical Repertory, and The Princeton Review
- The New-Harmony Gazette, and The Free Enquirer
- The American Journal of Pharmacy
- The American Journal of Education
- Graham's Magazine, and The Casket
- Journal of the Franklin Institute
- The Western Monthly Review
- The Friend
- The American Journal of Medical Sciences
- The Spirit of the Pilgrims
- The Southern Review
- The American Monthly Magazine (Willis's)
- Godey's Lady's Book
- The Illinois Monthly; The Western Monthly
- The New-England Magazine
- The American Monthly Review
- The Knickerbocker Magazine
- The Select Journal of Foreign Periodical Literature
- The Ladies' Companion (Snowden's)
- The Southern Literary Magazine
- The Western Messenger
- The Southern Literary Journal
- The Christian Review
- The New York Review (Henry's)
- The Ladies' Garland
- Burton's Gentleman's Magazine
- The Democratic Review
- The Boston Quarterly Review, and Brownson's Quarterly Review
- The Hesperian
- The Connecticut Common School Journal
- The Merchant's Magazine and Commercial Review
- The Magnolia; or, Southern Apalachian
- The Dial (Boston)
- Arcturus
- Merry's Museum
- The United States Catholic Magazine
- The Boston Miscellany
- The Southern Quarterly Review
- The American Agriculturist
- Miss Leslie's Magazine and Arthur's Ladies' Magazine
- The Pioneer (Lowell's)
- The Bibliotheca Sacra
- The Columbian Lady's and Gentleman's Magazine
- The Christian Parlor Magazine
- Littell's Living Age
- The American Whig Review
- The Southern and Western Magazine
- The Broadway Journal
- The Harbinger
- The Literary World
- The Union Magazine
- Friends' Review
- The Massachusetts Quarterly Review
- The John-Donkey

== Volume V ==
- The American Mercury
- Appleton's Booklovers Magazine
- Fruit, Garden and Home
- Better Homes & Gardens
- Better Homes and Gardens
- Current History
- The Editor and Publisher
- The Editor & Publisher
- Everybody's Magazine
- The Golden Book of Magazines
- Good Housekeeping
- Broadway Magazine
- The House Beautiful
- House Beautiful
- The Little Review
- The Midland
- The New Republic
- Poetry
- The Smart Set
- The South Atlantic Quarterly
- Success Magazine
- Time
- The Yale Review
