= John C. Freund =

British-American magazine publisher

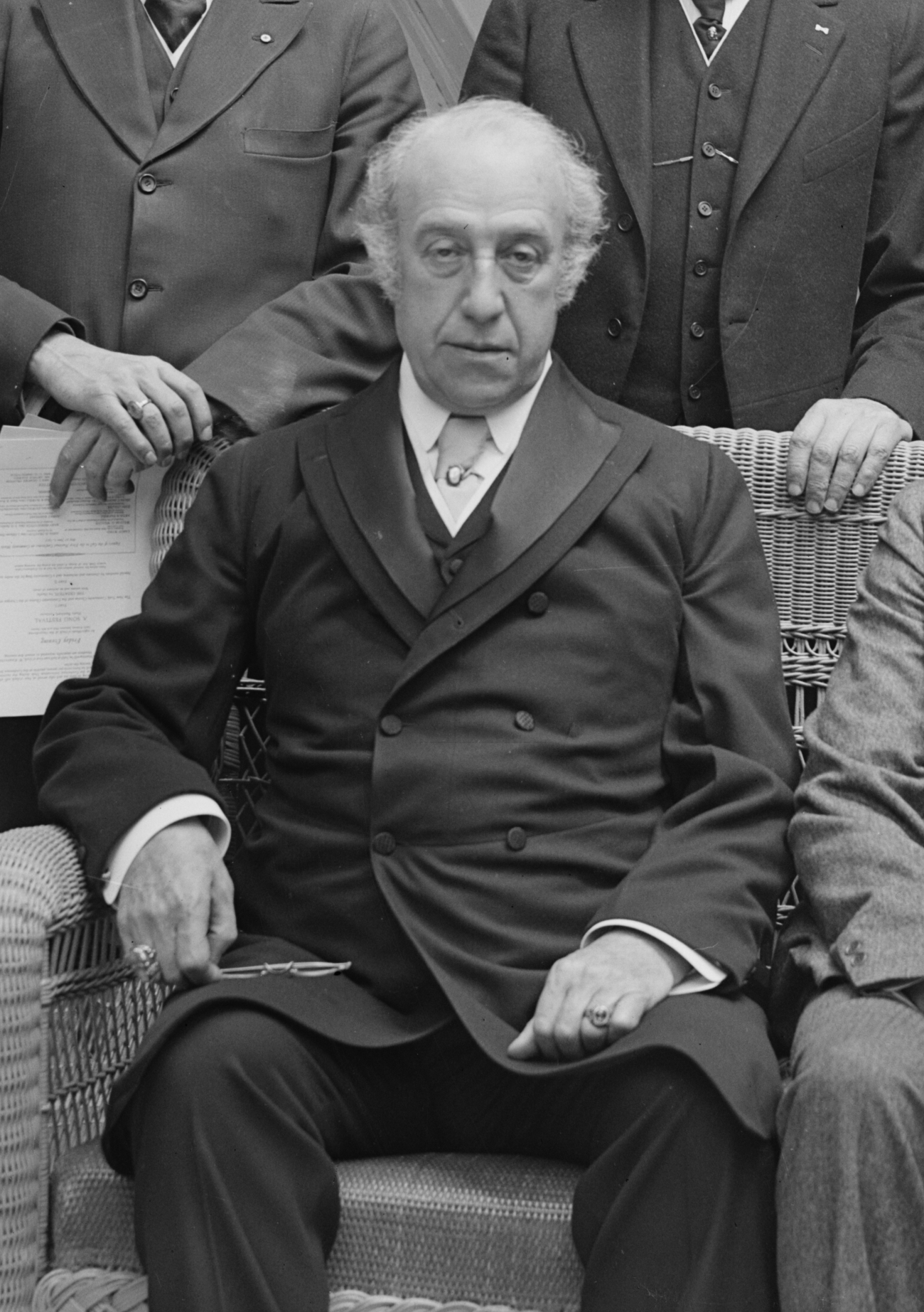
- Freund at the community chorus luncheon in Manhattan, 1917
- Born: November 22, 1848; London, England, U.K.
- Died: June 3, 1924 (aged 75); Mount Vernon, New York, U.S.
- Education: Exeter College, Oxford
- Occupations: Publisher, editor, playwright
- Known for: The Music Trades
- Spouses: Florence Smith (m. 1887; div. 1890) Anna C. Hughes (m. 1890)
- Parent(s): Jonas Charles Hermann Freund and Amelia Freund

John Christian Freund (November 23, 1848 – June 3, 1924) was a British-American magazine publisher, playwright, and music critic. He founded several magazines, including The Music Trades.

== Early life ==
Freund was born in London, England. He was one of the eight children of the physician Dr. Jonas Charles Hermann Freund and Amelia Louisa (née Rudiger) Freund, a writer on social economics under the name Amelia Lewis. His father was the deputy inspector of hospitals during the Crimean War, a surgeon in the British Army, and the founder and director of the German Hospital in Dalston, London.

In 1868 when he was nineteen years old, Freund attended Exeter College, Oxford where he studied music. He won both the Carpenter Scholarship and the Times (London) Scholarship in open competitions. He did not graduate, leaving after three years when he moved to the United States.

== Career ==
While he was still in college, Freund founded and edited The Dark Blue magazine. The Dark Blue was a literary journal that included essays, illustrations, poems, and stories by Ford Madox Brown, Sydney Colvin, Edward Dowden, W.S. Gilbert, Thomas Hughes, Andrew Lang, William Morris, Dante Gabriel Rossetti, William Michael Rossetti, Simeon Solomon, and A. C. Swinburne. Also while still at university in 1870, Freund wrote and produced a play, The Undergraduate, at the Queens Theatre in London.

Freund emigrated to the United States in 1871, fleeing his creditors after The Dark Blue went bankrupt. In New York City, he worked for trade papers, writing for The Wine and Spirit Gazette. He then founded and served as the editor of The Hat, Cap and Fur Trade Review. He purchased a critical weekly, the Arcadian, becoming its editor.

in 1873, Freund founded a music-specialty newspaper which became The Musical and Dramatic Times. After selling the music newspaper, he spent a year in Colorado and New Mexico. When he returned to New York, he founded the weekly publication Music. This became Music and Drama which was published daily. In late 1884, Freund became a partner in the fledgling The Journalist, generally considered to be the first successful American trade newspaper covering journalism.

His play, True Mobility, was produced in Chicago at the McVicker's Theatre in 1885. He played the leading role. He then joined Frank Mayo's theater company and performed leading roles in several plays through 1887.

Freund was the editor of American Musician from 1887 to 1890. In 1890, he founded The Music Trades with Milton Weil (1871–1935). He edited the Dolgeville Herald in Herkimer County, New York from 1891 to 1893. In 1898, he established and was editor of Musical America and was president of the related Musical America Co. He was also editor of The Piano and Organ Purchaser's Guide, an annual publication.

Freund was an investor in The Colored American Magazine, working with Booker T. Washington to control the editorial content and oust editor Pauline Hopkins in 1904.

== Personal life ==
In June 1872, John C Freund married Esther Barton Dewhurst in Chelsea, London, UK (source BDM UK). In 1887, Freund married Florence Smith of Boston, Massachusetts. They had one daughter, Florence Louise (born 1889). They divorced in 1890. He married Anna C. Hughes in 1890. Freud and Anna had two daughters: Annette (born 1896) and Marjorie (born 1904). The family lived at 760 West End Avenue in New York City.

He was a member of the National Geographic Society, National Civic Federation, the Pleiades Club, St. John's Guild, and the West End Association.

Freud died in Mount Vernon, New York in 1924 after a lingering illness.
