= Leopold Freund =

Leopold Freund (April 5, 1868 – January 7, 1943) was an Austrian-Jewish radiologist, considered the founder of medical radiology and radiotherapy.

Leopold Freund was born in Miskovice in Central Bohemia, then part of the Austro-Hungarian empire, now part of the Czech Republic. He died in Brussels in 1943.

Freund was a professor of radiology at the Medical University of Vienna and is considered the founder of medical radiology and radiotherapy. He is the first physician known to have used ionizing radiation for therapeutic purposes. In 1896, a year after the discovery of X-rays by Wilhelm Röntgen and in the same year that Antoine Henri Becquerel discovered radioactivity, Freund successfully treated a five-year-old patient in Vienna suffering from hairy moles covering her whole back. The case was published by the girl's local physician, Schiff, in 1901. In 1903, he published the first textbook on radiation therapy.

Freund also published fundamental work on the treatment occupational diseases with light and on the use of X-rays for testing construction materials.

Freund, who was a Jewish, emigrated to Belgium in 1938, following the annexation of Austria by Nazi Germany.
