= Michael Freund (historian) =

German historian and university teacher (1902–1972)

- Born: January 18, 1901; Weilheim in Oberbayern, Germany
- Died: June 15, 1972 (aged 71); Kiel, Germany
- Occupations: Historian, political scientist, and professor

Michael Freund (January 18, 1902 – June 15, 1972) was a German historian, political scientist, and professor at the Kiel University in Germany.

Freund's view was that Louis Napoleon was the only real revolutionist in 1848. Freund wrote, "After the solemn republican respectability of 1848 it seemed that only with the Napoleonic experiment did a great revolutionary élan appear on the stage of history". "The state created by Napoleon was anti-socialist, but it was not the laissez-faire state of capitalism. The social ideals of the disciples of Saint-Simon were given by Napoleon, for the first time, a military and authoritarian aspect."

== Biography ==
Freund was born in Weilheim, Upper Bavaria, in Germany. He studied history and sociology at the Kiel University in Germany.

He worked in Berlin and Freiburg before being dismissed. From 1951, he held a chair at the Kiel University, becoming full professor in 1956.

== Writings ==
- Die Idee der Toleranz im England der großen Revolution., PhD Halle 1927.
- Oliver Cromwell. Biographische Skizze, Lübeck 1933.
- Napoleon III. Eine Betrachtung zur Krise der Democratie in Frankreich, Deutsche Zeitschrift, XLVIII (October, 1934-September, 1935).
- Von Versailles zur Wehrfreiheit. Die Wiedererstehung Deutschlands als Großmacht, Essen 1936.
- Weltgeschichte der Gegenwart in Dokumenten 1934/35.
  - Vol. 1: Internationale Politik, Essen 1936.
  - Vol. 2: Staatsform und Wirtschaft der Nationen, Essen 1937.
- Die große Revolution in England. Anatomie eines Umsturzes, Hamburg 1951.
- Das Elitenproblem in der modernen Politik, Munich 1954.
- Deutsche Geschichte, Gütersloh 1960.
- Der zweite Weltkrieg, Gütersloh 1962.
- Das Dritte Reich 1933-1939, Gütersloh 1963.
- Deutschland unterm Hakenkreuz. Die Geschichte der Jahre 1933-1945, Gütersloh 1965.
- Das Drama der 99 Tage. Krankheit und Tod Friedrichs III., Cologne 1966.
- Napoleon und die Deutschen. Despot oder Held der Freiheit? Munich 1969.
- Georges Sorel. Der revolutionäre Konservatismus, 2nd ed. Frankfurt 1972.
