= Hairdressers Journal International =

Monthly glossy magazine for the hairdressing industry, published in the United Kingdom

- Cover of the October 2024 issue
- Editor: Charlotte Grant-West
- Deputy Editor: Sian Jones
- Content Writer: Chloe Weldon
- Categories: Hair, Beauty, Fashion
- Frequency: Monthly
- Founded: 1882
- First issue: May 6, 1882
- Company: Professional Beauty Group
- Country: United Kingdom
- Based in: London
- Language: English
- Website: hji.co.uk/magazine
- ISSN: 0143-6910

Hairdressers Journal International (sometimes referred to as Hairdressers' journal) is a monthly magazine for the hairdressing industry, published in the United Kingdom. The magazine has been in circulation since 1882. The magazine's executive director is Jayne Lewis-Orr and the magazine’s editor is Charlotte Grant-West.

== History ==
Hairdressers Journal International launched in 1882.

In 2005, publishing director Leon Clifford stepped down and Jayne Lewis-Orr, already editor-in-chief, also became publisher of Hairdressers Journal International.

During the early 2000, Reed Business Information (RBI) became a burdening asset in the new Reed-Elsevier organization. In 2015, RBI sold the Hairdressers Journal International to M Squared Media.

== Description ==
Hairdressers Journal International is a monthly magazine for the hairdressing industry published in the United Kingdom. The magazine provides trend features, salon business advice and coverage of news and events in the hairdressing industry. It also houses the HJ Gallery, which features hairdressing images that date back to the 1950s.

The magazine organizes the following events:

- British Hairdressing Awards: Launched in 1984 and hosted in association with Schwarzkopf Professional, the British Hairdressing Awards are sometimes considered the Oscars of the hairdressing industry.
- British Hairdressing Business Awards: Celebrates the business side of the hairdressing industry in the UK through 17 award categories including marketing, salon design, innovation, customer care and training.
- Salon International: Annual three-day exhibition launched in 1973 and held at ExCel London.

== British Hairdressing Awards Hall of Fame ==
Any stylist who wins three times in the same category at the British Hairdressing Awards is inducted to the Hall of Fame. This also means they can no longer enter in that same category. Past winners, and the category they were inducted for, are;

2022 – Caroline Sanderson (Scottish), Steven Smart (Wales & South West)
2021 – Sharon Malcolm (Northern Ireland), Shaun Hall (Midlands), Sylvestre Finold (Avant Garde), Rick Roberts (Afro)
2020 - Lisa Graham & Joseph I’Anson (Eastern), Julie Cherry (Northern Ireland), Andrea Giles & Terri Kay (Men’s), Dylan Brittain (Scottish)
2019 - Martin Crean (Wales and South West), Mark Leeson Art Team (Artistic Team)
2018 - Marcello Moccia (North Western), Michelle Thompson (Afro), Robert Eaton (Colour)
2017 - Charlotte Mensah (Afro)
2016 - Indira Shauwecker (Avant Garde)
2015 - Cos Sakkas (London)
2014 - Jamie Stevens (London), Philip Bell (Scottish), Bruno Marc Giamattei (Southern)
2013 - No new inductees
2012 - Ken Picton (Wales and Southwest), Kevin Kahan (Northern Ireland), Kay McIntyre (Scottish)
2011 - HOB Creative Team (Artistic Team), Terri Kay (Eastern), Christel Lundqvist (Schwarzkopf Professional British Colour Technician)
2010 - Sharon Peake (North Western)
2009 - Darren Ambrose (Avant Garde)
2008 - Tracey Devine (Scotland), Claire Rothstein (Afro)
2007 - Tim Scott-Wright (Midlands), Robert Eaton (North Eastern), Errol Douglas (Afro)
2006 - Mark Leeson (Eastern), Michael Young (North Western), Tina Farey (Southern), Jamie & Sally Brooks (London)
2005 - Charlie Taylor (Scottish), Robert Smith (Southern), Lisa Shepherd (Schwarzkopf Professional British Colour Technician)
2004 - Kathryn Longmuir (Afro), Charles & Karen Doods (North Western), Angelo Seminara (Avant Garde)
2003 - Lisa Shepherd (Midlands), Shane Bennett (Northern Ireland)
2002 - Jason and India Miller (Scottish), Desmond Murray (Afro)
2001 - Paul Stafford (Northern Ireland), Lawrence Anthony Cole (Midlands)
2000 - Tim Avory (Southern), Steven Goldsworthy (Wales and South West)
1999 - Phil Smith (Wales and South West)
1997 - Eugene Souleiman (Session), Keith Harris (Avant Garde), Mark Hill (North Western)
1996 - Umberto Giannini (Midlands)
1995 - Nicky Clarke (London), Gary Hooker (North Western)
1994 - Tom Mulrine (Northern Ireland), Sam McKnight (Session)
1993 - Terry Calvert (Eastern), TONI&GUY Artistic Team (Artistic Team)
1991 - Terry Jacques (Afro), Anthony Mascolo (British)
1990 - Guy Kremer (Southern), Jon Richardson (Eastern)
1989 - Trevor Sorbie (London), Charlie Miller (Northern)
1987 - Andrew Collinge (Midlands)
