= Timber Trades Journal =

UK trade magazine for the timber industry

Timber Trades Journal is a UK trade magazine for the timber industry, published by GlobalData. It was first published in 1873 and has been recognised as the leading journal for the timber industry.

Timber Trades Journal's annual TTJ Awards have been running for 13 years, and are held in association with UK timber industry trade association TRADA.
