= Musical Merchandise Review =

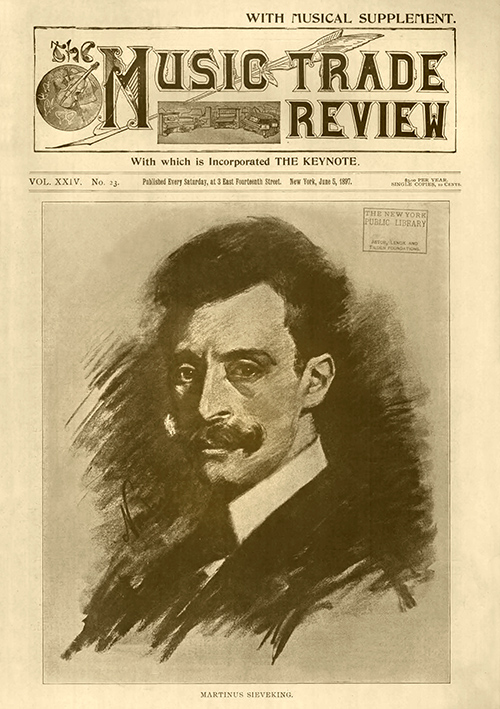
A June 1897 issue showing a portrait of the Dutch pianist Martinus Sieveking

Musical Merchandise Review is an American trade magazine "devoted to musical instrument retailing". MMR originates in a trade magazine called Music Trade Review, which was founded in 1879.

== History ==
The magazine was founded as the Music Trade Journal in 1879 in New York City by Charles Avery Welles (1848–1913), renamed Musical Critic and Trade Review, then renamed to Music Trade Review around 1883. In the late 1800s, it was owned by "Colonel" Edward Lyman Bill (1862–1916).

In March 1956, the magazine began to be issued as the Piano and Organ Review. In January 1958, that magazine merged with Musical Merchandise Magazine, and was published as Musical Merchandise Review.

Ownership of the magazine went, in August 2021, from Timeless Communications (which had acquired it from Symphony Publishing in 2013) to ArtistPro.
