= Gertrude Brown (disambiguation) =

Gertrude Brown may refer to:

- Gertrude Dorsey Brown (1876 or 1877–1963), American author and poet
- Gertrude Foster Brown (1867–1956), American concert pianist, teacher and suffragist
- Gertrude LeRoy Brown (1869–1934), American librarian and photographer
