= Of One Blood (novel) =

1902–1903 novel by Pauline Hopkins

Of One Blood: Or, The Hidden Self
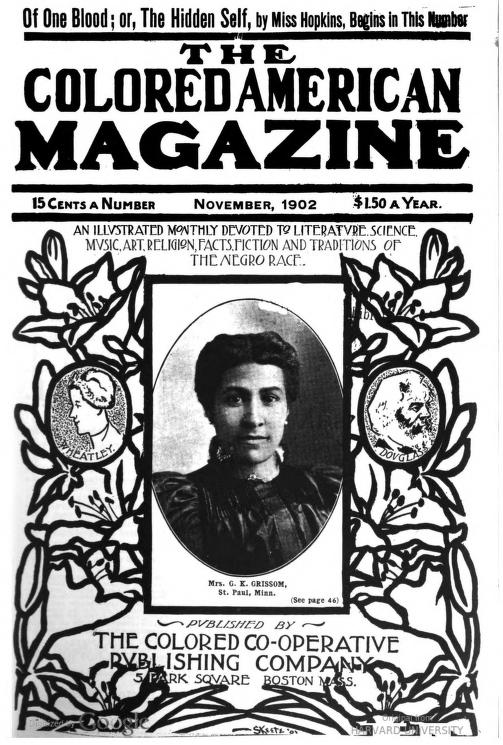
- Original cover of The Colored American Magazine, 1902
- Author: Pauline Hopkins
- Language: English
- Genre: Mystery, proto-science fiction
- Publisher: Washington Square Press
- Publication date: 1902–1903
- Publication place: United States
- Media type: Print (paperback)
- Pages: 224
- ISBN: 9780743467698

Of One Blood: Or, The Hidden Self is a novel by author Pauline Hopkins that was serialized in The Colored American Magazine from November 1902 to November 1903, during the four-year period in which Hopkins served as its editor. The novel follows the adventures of Reuel, a mixed-race American, as he travels to Nubia from America while treasure hunting. The novel explores issues of love, identity, trauma and spirituality through the perspective of the African-American community.

== Plot summary ==
The novel starts with Reuel Briggs in his apartment alone in Boston, Massachusetts, ruminating on his financial troubles as a medical student. Determined to improve his friend's mood, Aubrey persuades Reuel to attend a "Negro music" concert. There Reuel witnesses the talented Dianthe Lusk, a light-skinned "Negress" from the South, perform in the Fisk University Singers and becomes infatuated with her beautiful voice and appearance. They attend a house party hosted by Molly Vance, who is engaged to Aubrey, and her brother, Charlie. The group decides to visit the local Hyde House, which is rumored to be haunted, where Reuel encounters a spectral form of Dianthe, who requests Reuel's help.

That next morning, Reuel is called to treat the victims of a train accident. Among them is Dianthe, seemingly dead, but he revives her using a form of mesmerism. The revived Dianthe has no memory of her former self and Reuel's colleagues believe he has performed a miracle. Reuel and Aubrey persuade Dianthe to live with the Vance family under another name until she recovers and relearns her identity. Reuel falls in love with Dianthe during the stay and proposes to her. She accepts. Wanting to provide for his fiancée, he approaches Aubrey for work. Aubrey Introduces Reuel to a job on a dangerous but lucrative archaeological expedition to Nubia. Reuel, Charlie, and Aubrey's servant, Jim Titus, prepare for the expedition, and Aubrey stays in Boston with Molly and Dianthe. Charlie and Reuel frequently write back home, but eventually stop receiving correspondence.

They travel first to Egypt, and then via desert caravan to Nubia, where they seek the treasures of Meroe. They encounter many dangers on their journey. Soon after their arrive at the ruin, however, they receive news from America that Molly and Dianthe drowned in a boating accident on the Charles River near Boston. Mad with grief, Reuel disappears into the city's ruins to die. But he is kidnapped by unseen foes. He awakens in a luxurious palace within the hidden city of Telassar, built by the inhabitants of Meroe. A native man named Ai, who had passed as a local guide for the expedition, reveals his identity as a councilor and minister of Telassar. Ai introduces Reuel to Candace, the Queen of Telassar, and he begins to fall in love with her.

Meanwhile, Charlie and Titus search for Reuel, eventually discovering a secret passage beneath the ruins of Meroe. Telassar's soldiers capture them, but the two manage to escape into the city's tombs where they find a hoard of precious metals and gemstones guarded by serpents. Charlie is rescued by Ai and others, but Titus is mortally wounded. Before he dies, Titus confesses that Aubrey had ordered him to murder Reuel so that he would never return from Africa. To substantiate Titus's confession, Reuel commands Ai to use his people's magic to spy on Aubrey. They learn that Aubrey murdered Molly and faked Dianthe's death so as to marry her in secret. Enraged, Reuel and his companions return to America to seek revenge on Aubrey.

While being coerced by Aubrey to marry him, Dianthe gradually regains her memory and meets Hannah, an elderly former slave of the Livingstons. Hannah comforts Dianthe and teaches her that she, Aubrey, and Reuel are siblings, and that their mother—Hannah's daughter, Mira—is of Nubian descent enslaved by Aubrey's father. Distraught, Dianthe attempts to poison Aubrey in the night, but he thwarts her and forces Dianthe to drink the poison. Aubrey flees the estate that next morning and abandons Dianthe to her fate. She tries to cling to life, but Reuel arrives at the Livingston estate as Dianthe dies.

While traveling alone, Aubrey receives a vision that Dianthe still lives and quickly returns home, and is greeted by Reuel's men. They subdue Aubrey and condemn him. Their magic causes him to drown himself in a river. After Aubrey's death, Reuel learns they are all of one blood. Shocked by this news, Reuel returns to Telassar to serve as King and to teach his people about the new world.

== Main characters ==
- Reuel Briggs: The main protagonist of the novel, Reuel is a young man of mixed race and an accomplished medical student, even though he has a history of financial struggle without the support of his family. He does what he can to survive, which includes limiting his social life to school within the four walls of his apartment. Reuel is aware of his African American heritage, but he does not care to learn the history of African Americans. Instead, he merely passes as a white man because of his light skin tone. His romance with Dianthe Lusk becomes a keystone of the novel, but their relationship is fraught and comes to a bitter end. Only once he is bereaved of his love and realizes his royal lineage in Telassar does Reuel embrace his "inner self".
- Aubrey Livingston: Reuel's closest friend, Aubrey takes it upon himself to assist Reuel whenever possible. He is a southern white man who befriends Reuel and his attempts to make the protagonist socialize among their peers are endless. While Aubrey promises Reuel great fortune in an archaeological expedition to Nubia, he secretly plots to steal Reuel's love interest and later fiancée, Dianthe, for himself, even despite being engaged to another woman. His lust for Dianthe ultimately drives Aubrey to murder, betrayal, and his own undoing.
- Dianthe Lusk: A "Negress" from the South with a beautiful voice and talent for singing, Dianthe doesn't meet the protagonist until she is close to death after an accident. Reuel saves her life and soon believes that they are destined to be together, doing all that he can to shelter and tend to her. He and Aubrey even withhold the truth of Dianthe's identity when she loses her memory following the accident. Some would say she battles with hysteria following the traumatic events she suffers throughout the novel, especially after Aubrey seduces and manipulates Dianthe into marrying him.
- Charlie Vance: Introduced as a friend of Reuel and Aubrey, as well as brother to Aubrey's fiancée, Molly Vance, Charlie is a flamboyant young man from an upper-class background. Known as "Adonis" for his well-groomed appearance and fondness of high society life, he later accompanies Reuel to Nubia in search of fortune and adventure.
- Ai: The prime minister to a prophesied King destined to restore the Kush line to its former glory, Ai serves as Reuel's counsel upon his arrival to Telassar. He shares with Reuel the wonders of their city and offers him the choice of becoming their King.
- Queen Candace: A young woman that Reuel meets while in Telassar, Candace serves as the Queen of Telassar in the absence of a King. Her existence is almost metaphysical as she is reborn in a sense; Candace is the virgin queen who reigns in intervals of fifteen years while sharing the name of her successor. Reuel begins to fall in love with Candace upon learning of Dianthe's apparent death.
- Hannah: An elderly former slave belonging to the Livingstons, Hannah comforts Dianthe after she is coerced into marrying Aubrey. Hannah also informs Dianthe of her history and relationship with Aubrey and Reuel as half-siblings, having tended to them as infants. Hannah is the mother of Mira.
- Mira: The late mother of Dianthe, Reuel, and Aubrey, Mira was a royal citizen of Telassar who traveled the world before she was enslaved by Aubrey Livingston's father. During her enslavement at the Livingston estate, she entertained the family and their guests with parlor tricks and prophecies.

== Background ==
The novel's title was inspired by Acts 17:26 in the Bible: "Of one blood I made all nations of man to dwell upon the whole face of the earth (...) No man can draw the dividing line between the two races, for they are both of one blood!" Hopkins's main purpose in writing the novel was to expose and unravel the entangled genealogies of blacks and whites, the irrefutable evidence that they were literally, biologically, "of one blood". The text's collective argument, according to its introduction, is that blood has so effortlessly mixed between the two races that any attempt to disentangle them is rendered impossible. The novel is considered as a novel that "deals in no uncertain terms with both the temporal and spiritual solution of the greatest question of the age- The Negro."

According to Colleen O'Brien, critics often regard it as one of the earliest articulations of Black internationalism because it is the first African-American novel to both feature African characters and take place in Africa. The novel was published in the same year that W. E. B. Du Bois originated the famous phrase "the color line" in his 1903 collection of essays The Souls of Black Folk, in which the phrase describes the hypothetically dividing line between the white and black races. Hopkins's originating the text in Boston honed in on one of the epicenters of debate in the United States on "blood", bloodlines, and roots of "human family". The selection of "The Hidden Self" as the subtitle serves as a "metaphor for the suppressed history of oppressive social and familial relations under the institution of slavery."

Of One Blood was rereleased in 2022 as part of the Radium Age Series of classic science fiction from the MIT Press. This new edition includes an introduction by Minister Faust. Faust writes: "By interweaving fantastical delights with historical realities, Hopkins’ Afritopian novel dramatizes the glory not just of what could have been, but what could still be, if we find the power to free our civilization from a philosophy of exploitation, degradation, and death, and replace it with what one nineteenth-century Liberian poet demanded of a new African nation: liberty, 'proud science,' glories, and art, to 'Arise and now prevail/O’er all thy foes;/In truth and righteousness—/In all the arts of peace—/Advance, and still increase/Though hosts oppose.'"

== Themes ==
The novel drifts between two genres, romanticism and realism, as the protagonist, a Harvard medical student, moves from one country to the other. Focusing on Reuel's racial passing as a white man, Of One Blood; Or, The Hidden Self begins in The United States and slowly progresses to Africa with his discovery of the hidden city and advancement from "passer to prophet".

=== Haitian culture ===
Though recognized for its affiliation with twentieth-century Africanisms, the novel also employs concepts popularly associated to Haitian culture. According to Mary Grace Albanese, the matrilineality of the novel's female characters Hannah, Mira, and Dianthe Lusk resonates with historical and mythologized Haitian perceptions of womanhood, and the preternatural abilities and practices displayed throughout the novel are significant to Haitian Vodou.

=== The burden of royalty ===
In the story, scholar Melissa Asher Daniels has stated that by journeying into the hidden world, Reuel's royal bloodline not only makes him the heir to a long, rich history of African achievement, but also crowns him as king to a body of people that he previously rejected being a part of. This prophecy that his being there is fulfilling not only burdens him, but drags Reuel into a world that he may not have otherwise accepted.

=== Race ===
People were associated with a particular race by their physical features. In the United States, race stands as a dominant governing characteristic that dictates an individual's social standing. Moving to the African part of Hopkins's narrative of a Utopian world, it is presented as an important factor for cultural worth but otherwise meaningless. Even with the "one drop" rule, Reuel was able to pass as a white male even though he is African American. Physical features do not always define your race and that was a dominant message in the novel as race is a social construct.

=== Mysticism ===
Seen most prominently through the sages that serve the queen and the temple in which they meet, mysticism remains a strong underlying theme as Reuel ventures through the hidden city, blanketed over by the power of kings that were his forefathers. This can also be seen as Reuel tries to interpret various visions throughout the novel that depict upcoming events in his travels and Dianthe's resurrection.

=== Culture ===
Reuel leaves America with no knowledge or care for his ancestral history; he sees culture more as a crutch than a gift and it's this mindset of blissful ignorance that leads him towards a relationship he'll regret. He felt disconnected from his African American roots because of his persistence to identify himself as an Anglo-Saxon. He's comfortable passing for white because it means that the world must see him for everything else that he is. The resolution for many, if not all of his problems, is found while later embracing where he came from.

=== Love and trauma ===
The idea of love is one that is common throughout the novel, but the accuracy of saying these relationships stem from love is something that could be questioned. When it comes to Reuel and Dianthe, love only comes after major trauma. Reuel may have loved her (or at least lusted after her) but was she ever really in the mindset to return these feelings? Looking at Aubrey, everything between him and Dianthe was forced but he wanted a relationship because Reuel had her. It plays into society's ideology that as a "white" man, he had rights to everything and more that a black man could have, so why not just take it? Consent was never something he considered. Hopkins used Dianthe to portray the sexual abuse and trauma that many African-American women underwent during and after slavery.

=== Hysteria ===
Dianthe's character is used to depict that the diagnosis of hysteria that affected many women was not something that was only put upon white females. She portrays many of the symptoms that were used by physicians to diagnose patients and even goes through similar treatments.

=== Water ===
Water is the source of life, but it's also a means for travel (by boat and portal), a carrier of death in form of poison, the final resting place for two characters, and a mirror that reflects images that onlookers in the novel may not care to see. An ocean is what separates our protagonist from the hidden city but it's also what carries him back. Molly and Aubrey are both drowned at different points and both times, Reuel uses water to transport to or away from the bodies.

=== Memory ===
It's the loss of memory that not only stimulates a relationship between Reuel and Dianthe, but also causes a lot of conflict throughout the story line all together. The three siblings cross paths when they do but fail to remember their origins until the very end. These memories lead Reuel back to Africa.

=== Science vs. spirituality ===
Blood plays a major role in the novels main theme to describe that the human race, no matter origin or social class, stem from one birthplace, a scientific argument that Hopkins strongly supports. She also uses science to explain African spirituality that can be seen through the novel's mystic undertones by simplifying concepts of fate that a sceptic audience would otherwise not believe.

=== Incest ===
White-passing children of an enslaved woman, as seen through Reuel, Aubrey, and Dianthe. Incest is one of many common narratives buried beneath the nightmare that was American chattel slavery. Sometimes it happened by accident as white captors destroyed any information of their African lineage. In other scenarios, it was forced to increase numbers.

=== History ===
Although the novel is a work of fiction, Hopkins uses historical and literary sources, as well as travelogues, to construct a historical argument. Her argument, which ran counter to many histories of that time, was that the ancient cultures of the Nile Valley were African in origin, not imported to the area from elsewhere.
