= Richard Yarborough =

American academic

- Born: 1951 (age 74–75)
- Occupation: Professor
- Writing career
- Genre: African-American literature
- Notable work: The Heath Anthology of American Literature (editor)

Richard A. Yarborough (born 1951) is Professor of English and African-American literature and a Faculty Research Associate with the Ralph J. Bunche Center for African American Studies at the University of California, Los Angeles. He is also an editor of The Heath Anthology of American Literature.

== Background ==
Yarborough received his B.A. in English from Michigan State University in 1973 and his Ph.D. from Stanford University in 1980. He joined the English department at UCLA in 1979, his teaching and research focusing on issues relating to African-American literature, including pre-World War I African-American literature and the representation of slavery and race in American culture. At the time, he taught the only course offered in that field by UCLA, but in 2014 it was noted by King-Kok Cheung, a professor of English and Asian American studies: "Our English department is now considered one of the strongest—if not the strongest—in African American literature, with the richest selection of courses in the country."

The Heath Anthology of American Literature, with Yarborough as Associate General Editor, was launched in 1990, and he was also a founder of "The Library of Black Literature" series in which books by African-American authors are reprinted. He also worked with Henry Louis Gates Jr. on The Norton Anthology of African American Literature.

Yarborough has been a consultant on a number of films, including The Josephine Baker Story (1991) and The Life and Crimes of Doris Payne (2013).

In 2012, the Richard A. Yarborough Mentoring Award was set up by the American Studies Association's Minority Scholars' Committee to "honor a scholar who, like Richard Yarborough, demonstrates dedication to and excellence in mentoring."

In 2016 he was awarded the Darwin T. Turner Distinguished Scholar Award from the African American Literature and Culture Society.

== Selected publications ==
=== Books ===
Heath:

- Associate General Editor, with Paul Lauter (General Editor), Jackson Bryer, King-Kok Cheung, Anne Goodwyn Jones, Wendy Martin, Charles Molesworth, Raymund Paredes, Ivy Schweitzer, Linda Wagner-Martin, Andrew O. Wiget, and Sandy Zagarell. The Heath Anthology of American Literature. 5th edn, rev. Boston, Mass.: Houghton Mifflin, 2006.
- Associate General Editor, with Paul Lauter (General Editor), Juan Bruce-Novoa, Jackson Bryer, Elaine Hedges, Anne Goodwyn Jones, Amy Ling, Wendy Martin, Charles Molesworth, Carla Mulford, Raymund Paredes, Linda Wagner-Martin, and Andrew Wiget. The Heath Anthology of American Literature. 3rd edn, rev. 2 vols. Boston, Mass.: Houghton Mifflin, 1998.
- Associate General Editor, with Paul Lauter (General Editor), Juan Bruce-Novoa, Jackson Bryer, Elaine Hedges, Anne Goodwyn Jones, Amy Ling, Daniel Littlefield Jr., Wendy Martin, Charles Molesworth, Carla Mulford, Raymund Paredes, Linda Wagner-Martin, and Andrew Wiget. The Heath Anthology of American Literature. 2nd edn, rev. 2 vols. Lexington, Mass.: D. C. Heath, 1994.
- Co-editor, with Paul Lauter (General Editor), Juan Bruce-Novoa, Jackson Bryer, Elaine Hedges, Amy Ling, Daniel Littlefield, Wendy Martin, Charles Molesworth, Carla Mulford, Raymund Paredes, Hortense Spillers, Linda Wagner-Martin, and Andrew Wiget. The Heath Anthology of American Literature. 2 vols. Lexington, Mass.: D. C. Heath, 1990.

Norton:

- Co-editor, with Henry Louis Gates Jr. and Nellie Y. McKay (General Editors), William L. Andrews, Houston A. Baker Jr., Barbara T. Christian, Frances Smith Foster, Deborah E. McDowell, Robert G. O'Meally, Arnold Rampersad, and Hortense Spillers. The Norton Anthology of African American Literature. New York: W. W. Norton, 1997.

Reprint Series

- General Editor, The Library of Black Literature reprint series, University Press of New England (formerly published by Northeastern University Press), 1988–2008. Given the 2002 African American History Award by the Boston Museum of Afro-American History.

=== Essays ===
Introductions

- Uncle Tom's Children by Richard Wright. Harper Perennial Modern Classics, 2008.
- Sons Of Darkness, Sons Of Light: A Novel of Some Probability by John A. Williams. Northeastern; new edition, 1999.
- Contending Forces: A Romance Illustrative of Negro Life North and South by Pauline Hopkins. New York: Oxford University Press, 1988.

Articles

- "Race, Violence, and Manhood: The Masculine Ideal in Frederick Douglass's 'The Heroic Slave'" In Haunted Bodies: Gender and Southern Texts. Anne Jones and Susan Donaldson, eds. Charlottesville, VA: University of Virginia Press, 1997:159–84
- "Strategies of Black Characterization in Uncle Tom's Cabin and the Early Afro-American Novel." In Literary Influence and African-American Writers. Tracy Mishkin (ed.). New York: Garland, 1996: 23–64.
- "Black Authors, White Readers: Early Afro-American Fiction Writers and the Problem of Audience." In Lire en Amérique. Paris, France: Institut d'Etudes Anglophones, Université Paris VII-Denis Diderot, 1993: 33–46.
- "Race, Violence, and Manhood: The Masculine Ideal in Frederick Douglass's 'The Heroic Slave.'" In Frederick Douglass: New Literary and Historical Essays. Sundquist, Eric J. (ed.). Cambridge:Cambridge University Press, 1991: 166–88.
- "The First Person in Afro-American Fiction." In Afro-American Literary Study in the 1990s. Houston A. Baker Jr. and Patricia Redmond (eds.) Chicago: University of Chicago Press, 1989:105–134.
- "The Crisis in Afro-American Letters." College English, vol. 43, no. 8, pp. 773–78, December 1981
- "The Quest for the American Dream in Three Afro-American Novels: If He Hollers Let Him Go, The Street, and Invisible Man." MELUS, vol. 8, no. 4, pp. 33–59, January 1981.
