= Albreta Moore Smith =

American writer, clubwoman (c. 1875–1957)

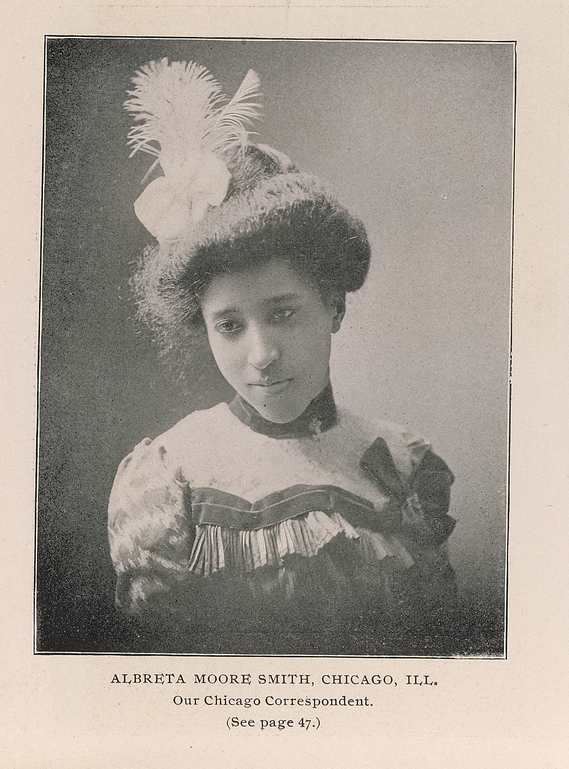
- Born: Albreta Moore c. 1875; Illinois, United States
- Died: September 7, 1957; Chicago, Illinois, U.S.
- Burial place: Oak Woods Cemetery, Chicago, Illinois, U.S.
- Other names: Alberta Moore Smith, Alberta Moore–Smith, Alberta Moore Covington, Alberta Covington
- Occupations: Writer, stenographer, club woman
- Spouse: Christopher C. Covington (m. 1922–)

Albreta Moore Smith (née Albreta Moore; c. 1875 – September 7, 1957) was an American writer, stenographer, and club woman. Smith founded the Colored Women's Business Club of Chicago, the first incorporated African American women's business club. She was also known as Albreta Moore–Smith, Alberta Moore Smith, Albreta Covington, and Alberta Covington.

== Life and career ==
Albreta Moore was born c. 1875 in Illinois. She was a correspondent in the early 20th century for The Colored American Magazine. She had also published work in Chicago newspapers.

Smith founded the first incorporated African American women's business club in 1900, the Colored Women's Business Club of Chicago. Smith served as an officer of the National Negro Business League, founded by Booker T. Washington. She was the president of the South End Children's Aid Society in Chicago; and also president of The Women's Service League.

In her later life, Smith worked as a probation officer, retiring in 1941.

== Publications ==
- Smith, Alberta M. (December 1900). "Chicago Notes" (PDF). The Colored American. Vol. 2, no. 2. pp. 147–148. Archived (PDF) from the original on September 19, 2025.
- Moore–Smith, Albreta (March 1902). "Woman's Development in Business" (PDF). The Colored American Magazine. Vol. 4, no. 4. pp. 323–326. Archived from the original (PDF) on February 24, 2025.
- Moore–Smith, Alberta (March 1903). "An Answer to "Mr. Roosevelt's Negro Policy"" (PDF). The Colored American. Vol. 6, no. 5. Archived from the original (PDF) on June 19, 2024.
- Moore–Smith, Albreta (July 1903). "Noted Business Women of Chicago: Mrs. Hattie Hicks" (PDF). The Colored American. Vol. 6, no. 7. pp. 507–509. Archived from the original (PDF) on September 19, 2025.
