= Marie Louise Burgess-Ware =

- Born: 1870
- Died: unknown
- Occupation: Nurse, Author
- Education: New England Hospital for Women and Children
- Subject: African American Literature
- Notable works: Bernice, The Octoroon, Ave Maria: A Tale

Marie Louise Burgess-Ware was an author of African-American literature, primarily on biracial people in both nonfiction and fiction.

== Life and career ==
Little is known about Marie Louise Burgess-Ware. She achieved further success in her writing career after appearing in Colored Magazine in 1903 with her fictional story "Bernice, The Octoroon".

== Known works ==
=== Nursing writings ===
Found in the Women's Era writings of 1894, Burgess-Ware contributed several pieces of work on nursing including:

- "The Nursing of Sick Children", June 1894
- "Notes on Nursing", July 1894
- "The Dixie Hospital and Hampton Training School for Nurses", August 1894
- "A Night Watch", September 1894
- "Typhoid Fever", September 1894
- African American Literature

=== Short stories ===
==== Ave Maria: A Tale. ====
Burgess-Ware was the author of "Ave Maria: A Tale," a short story written in 1895. The story focuses on Marguerite Earle, a faithful Catholic woman described as having blue eyes and "soft brown ringlets". The main plot of the story is the conflict Marguerite has when she falls in love with a man named Ronald Ives, who does not share her same religious beliefs as a Presbyterian. Marguerite decides to focus on her nursing career, and wills away the love she has for Ronald, but her feelings persist. It is revealed that Ronald is later married to a woman named Corrine Payne and has a child with her as Marguerite ends up being the nurse tasked with keeping the child alive. The child dies, but first Marguerite makes sure to bless it, as it was never baptized. They part ways once again, but Ronald is convinced by Corrine to be baptized, to which Marguerite ends up being present for. In the end, the two never reconcile, and Marguerite dies. The last scene pans to Ronald with gray hair weeping over her grave.

==== "Bernice, the Octoroon" ====
Burgess-Ware's African American literature is primarily based on the concept of the "tragic mulatta". The only piece of work written on race known by Burgess-Ware is "Bernice, the Octoroon". The story was published in Colored American Magazine volume six in 1903. It focuses on a wealthy woman (Bernice) discovering that she is in fact one-eighth black. Bernice is blonde-haired girl with blue eyes and comes from a wealthy family. She is living a privileged life and is engaged to her beloved fiancé Garret Purnello. Bernice is sympathetic towards African Americans and treats them with kindness, however, once Bernice discovers her ancestry, she becomes distressed. She knows that she can no longer continuing living her life as a white woman. Bernice is deeply saddened because she feels that her engagement will end once Garret discovers her ancestry; however, it turns out that Garrett, too, is one-eighth black. The two get married and Bernice ends up teaching at a school for black children. Burgess-Ware's work is influenced by that of George Eliot and that authors work The Spanish Gypsy . Both this work and "Bernice, the Octoroon" were published in Colored American Magazine and feature protagonists that are unaware that they are biracial, and thus live in white society. This work has been described as a racial uplift narrative, and an embodiment of the transracial movement. In addition to being printed in Colored American Magazine, this short story has been reprinted in Short Fiction by Black Women, 1900-1920 edited by Elizabeth Ammons. This book compiles the work of Burgess-Ware and other black women writing short fiction in this time period. "Bernice, the Octoroon" is the only work by Burgess-Ware to appear in this collection of stories.
