= Gertrude Dorsey Brown =

American author and poet

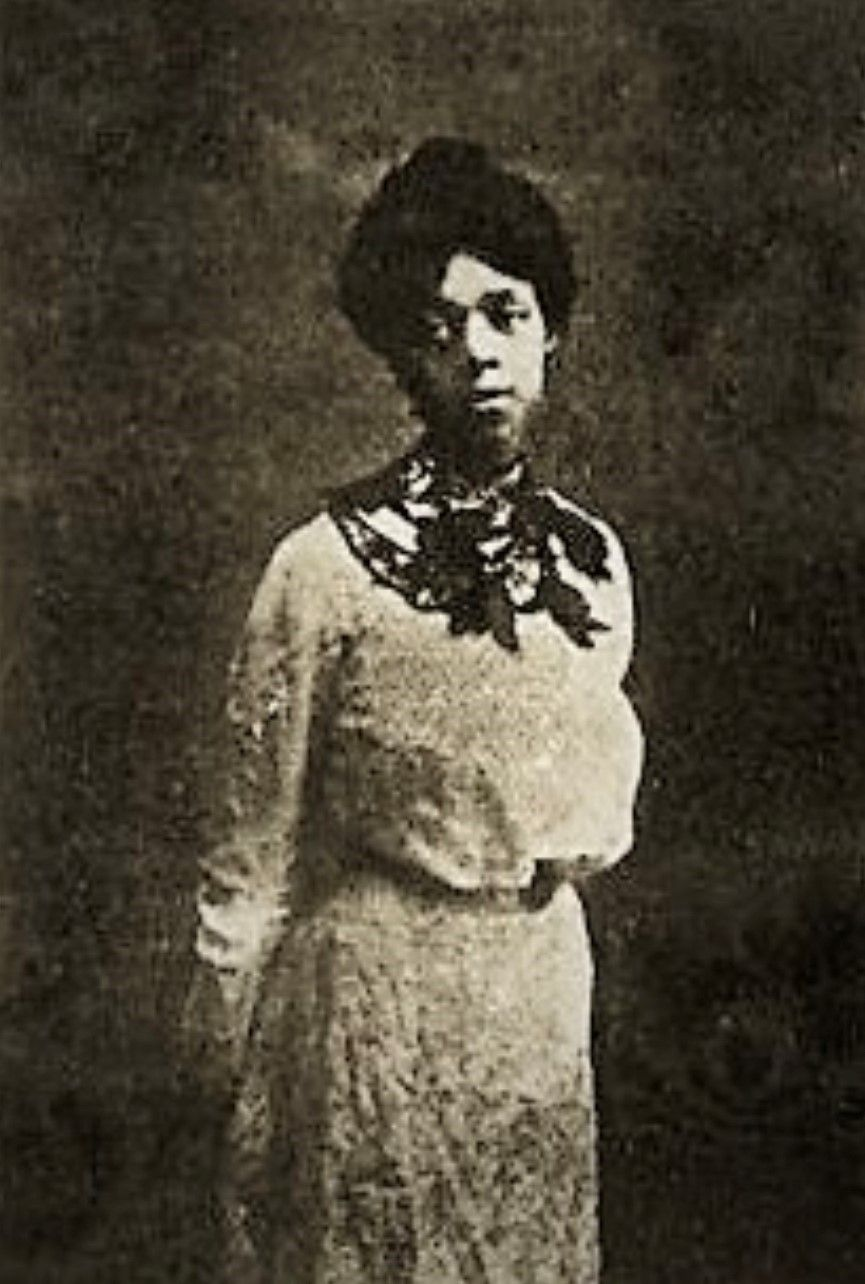
Portrait of Gertrude Dorsey Brown

Gertrude Dorsey Brown (August 1, 1876/77 – April 20, 1963) was an American author and poet who was born in Coshocton, Ohio. The majority of her career focused on writing columns for magazines, but she also published short stories and poems. Her printed works, which appeared from 1902 to 1907, were mainly fictional, twist-of-fate narratives. Her writings highlighted the racism experienced by African Americans in the 20th century, emphasizing themes of Black sisterhood and challenging the dominant culture of oppression. In addition to her literary successes, Brown is known for suing a Newark, Ohio, ice cream parlor for discrimination in 1914. Deeply involved in the Newark community where she spent most of her life, Brown dedicated her time to a variety of civic organizations and causes.

== Family and early life ==
=== Family ===
A decade before the birth of Gertrude Dorsey Brown, her father, Clement Dorsey, was one of the few survivors of a tragic collision of the Nannie Byers and C. E. Hillman steamboats on the Ohio River. He moved to Coshocton, Ohio, in 1868 and opened a barber shop, ultimately becoming a respected businessman within the community. He was the first African American juror of the county in 1875 and the first citizen of color to be nominated for a county office. Mr. Dorsey received a patent for fly paper that had advertisements on it in 1891.

On October 14, 1869, Clement Dorsey married Martha Johnson, a widow. Martha had one daughter from her first marriage, Dora. Together, the Dorseys had six children: Effie, Isaac, Jessie, Gertrude, and two boys who died during infancy. Martha Dorsey assisted with her husband's business and helped establish a Seventh Day Adventist Church in Coshocton. Gertrude Hayes Dorsey was born to Clement and Martha Dorsey on August 1, 1876.

=== Early life ===
Gertrude attended Coshocton High School and was the only African American student in her class. Her writing talents were apparent from an early age. During high school, Gertrude began publishing her writings for the first time in the Cleveland Gazette, America's longest-publishing African American newspaper, which was founded in 1883. This paper supplied news to the local Black community and had about 5,000 regular readers at the time she wrote for it. Gertrude wrote articles about local events in Coshocton and, on occasion, Newark, when she visited her sister Dora, who lived there. As a teenager, she was elected president of the Pope Literary Society at her high school. She maintained honor roll throughout all of high school and graduated with high honors in 1896.

=== Teaching ===
After graduating with honors from Coshocton High School in the fall of 1896, Gertrude Dorsey Brown took a job as a teacher at a school in Sutton, West Virginia, in January 1897. Brown's sister, Jessie Catherine Dorsey, was also an educator who cofounded a school for Black students in South Carolina that later became Voorhees University.

== Writing career ==
By the year 1900, Gertrude Dorsey had moved to Newark, Ohio, where she was living with her sister Dora and brother-in-law Daniel. While living there, she continued working as a teacher. She also started publishing in the Boston-based Colored American Magazine, a monthly magazine that covered African American culture, promoted Black literature, and highlighted Black women's issues. Between 1902 and 1907, Brown wrote several stories and poems for the magazine, exploring themes of racial identity, social justice, and the challenges faced by Black Americans.

Her first published short story for the magazine, entitled “An equation,” appeared in the August 1902 issue. The fictional story is about a romance between a 19-year-old young woman who obtains a position as assistant to the principal of her college and a 26-year-old school inspector. The couple's relationship almost doesn’t develop, due to missed communications and excessive attention to mathematical certainties and uncertainties. The romance examines the obstacles of misunderstanding, hesitation, and logic in relationships. While racial issues are evident, they appear as a background factor rather than the central theme in the story. “An equation” is an example of an early 20th-century African American short story that goes beyond mere protest or reportage to engage with universal themes, such as love, in a unique styles (in this case, using the language and metaphors of mathematics).

"Scrambled Eggs," a short story published in 1905, is set after the Civil War. In this story, a wealthy white man with racist beliefs discovers that his wife was unknowingly switched at birth. Her mother was part black, which means that his wife and children are all mixed race. Struggling with this new information, he shares the secret with his daughter Dora's fiancé, who decides that he still wants to marry her. However, the truth is revealed at their wedding, causing an uproar and scandal, since interracial marriage was illegal at the time. The rest of the story follows the family as they face conflicts and discover who truly cares for them. After deep reflection, Dora realizes they have been too focused on the shame that was brought upon the family, when in truth, their character and worth have not been changed. Moving forward, Dora decides to embrace her identity and live with pride and determination.

Brown also wrote poems, including "The Untold," which she composed when one of her sister's friends passed away.

=== Published works ===
- The Equation, a short story published in the Colored American Magazine, August 1902
- Scrambled Eggs, a short story published in the Colored American Magazine 8, January to February 1905
- The Better Looking, published in Colored American Magazine 8, March 1905
- Blood Money of La Petei, published in Colored American Magazine 9, October 1905
- A Case of Measure for Measure,1906
- The Voice of Rich Pudding, 1907

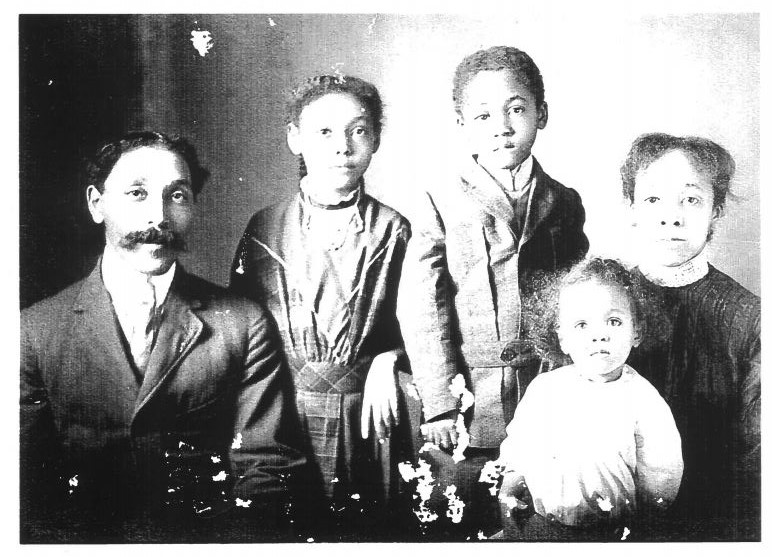
Hayes and Children Jessie, Marshall, and Guy on Gertrude's lap circa 1914

== Marriage and children ==
In June of 1903, Gertrude Dorsey married Orlando Hayes Brown of Zanesville, Ohio. Their wedding, which took place at one of her sisters' houses in Newark, Ohio, was considered a significant social event in the area's Black society circles. The Browns had three children, Jessie, Marshall, and Guy, and the family lived at 342 North 10th St. in Newark, Ohio.

== Discrimination lawsuit ==
In July of 1914, Brown and a friend, Clara Riggs, went downtown Newark to get ice cream. After the two women seated themselves and placed their order, the owner of the store approached them and informed them that they would have to pay double because they were Black. Brown and Riggs refused and left the store. Later, Brown sued the ice cream parlor for discrimination, seeking damages of $500 for public shame and humiliation. Since the legislation against discrimination only applied to places defined as restaurants, and the business was classified as an ice cream parlor, Brown lost the case.

== Civic involvement ==
Gertrude Dorsey Brown was an active member of her community throughout her life in more ways than just her writings. In 1908, she became a founding member of the Nimble Thimble Sewing Club.

Along with being the founder of the sewing club, she was active in many other organizations, such as the National Association of Colored Women’s Clubs (NACW), which she joined in 1916. The NACW (founded 1896) was a national federation that coordinated local Black women’s clubs around education, civil rights, child welfare, anti-lynching efforts, and civic programs. Local membership connected Brown to a nationwide network of Black women activists and reformers.

Brown was also a member of the Col. Charles Young Women’s Relief Corps, a women’s auxiliary named for Colonel Charles Young, who is a prominent early Black Army colonel and civic symbol. The relief corps typically supported veterans, sponsored patriotic ceremonies, and held local performances.

Brown and her family were active at Trinity A.M.E. Church in Newark, a Black congregation that served as both a spiritual center and a hub for social, educational, and political organizing in the community.

== Death and burial ==
Brown died on April 20, 1963, two months before her 60th wedding anniversary. She was 86 years old and was laid to rest at Cedar Hill Cemetery. Her husband, Hayes, died in 1969.

== Legacy and influence ==
Gertrude Dorsey Brown's life, her talents, contributions, and legacies have inspired many people over the course of the last century. One was Jessie Redmon Fauset, a writer and editor for W.E.B Du Bois’ The Crisis during the Harlem Renaissance. Fauset honored Getrude Dorsey Brown by naming a character "Gertrude Brown" in her 1931 novel, The Chinaberry Tree. Similar to Brown's stories, the novel's themes include racial prejudice, race-passing, and family tensions. Some experts theorize that Brown helped popularize this literary genre in the 20th century.

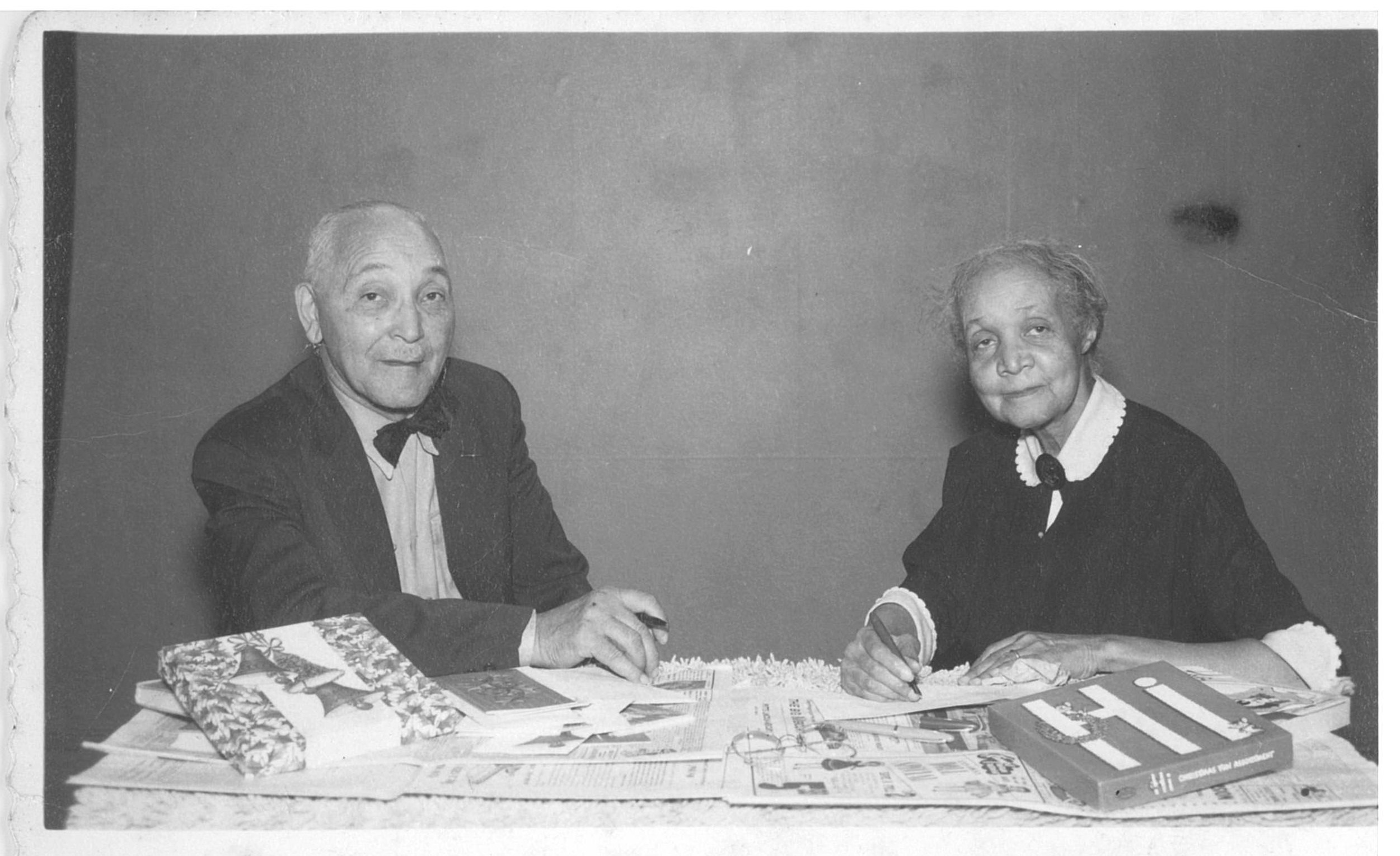
Hays and Gertrude Christmas Card

Browns works were later anthologized by Elizabeth Ammons in the collection Short Fiction by Black Women, 1900–1920, published in 1991 by Oxford University Press, USA.

In 2017, a book club in Licking County, Ohio, gathered to discuss Brown's story "The Equation." This sparked an investigation into the details of Brown's life and helped revive her memory among locals. The book club held a memorial service for Gertrude Dorsey Brown at the site of her unmarked grave in Cedar Hill Cemetery.

In 2022, artist Curtis Goldstein painted a mural on the east side of the Licking County Library that features writers, scientists, and others who contributed to the development of the region. A portrait of Brown is prominently featured in the mural.
