= The Colored American Magazine =

American early 20th-century publication

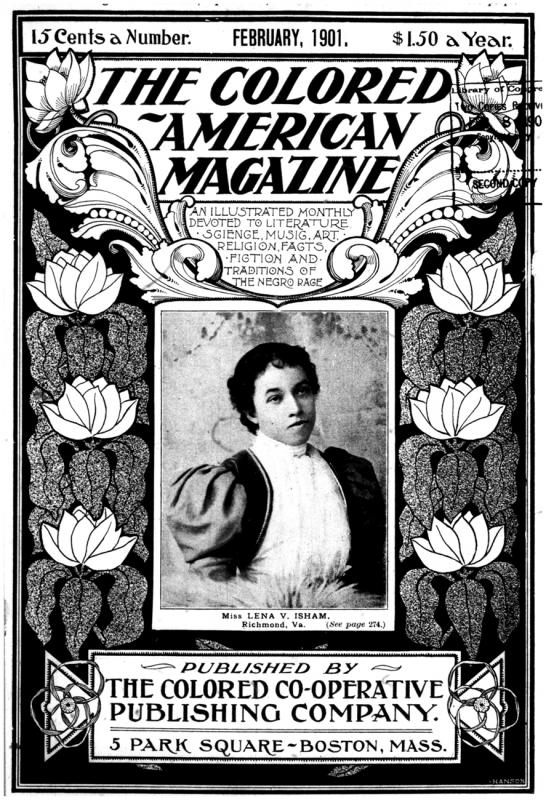
- The Colored American, February 1901
- Editor: Fred R. Moore (1904–1909)
- Former editors: Pauline Hopkins (1900–1904)
- Frequency: Monthly
- Format: Print
- Publisher: The Colored Co-Operative Publishing Company (1900–1903) The Colored American Publishing Company (1904–1903) Moore Publishing and Printing Company (1904–1909)
- Founder: Harper S. Fortune Walter Alexander Johnson; Walter Wallace Jesse W. Watkins
- Founded: 1900
- Final issue: 1909
- Country: United States
- Based in: Boston (1900–1904); New York (1904–1909)
- Language: en
- OCLC: 1564200

The Colored American Magazine was the first monthly publication in the United States that covered African-American culture. It ran from May 1900 to November 1909 and had a peak circulation of 17,000. The magazine was initially published out of Boston by the Colored Co-Operative Publishing Company, and from 1904 forward, by Moore Publishing and Printing Company in New York. The editorial staff included novelist Pauline Hopkins, who was also the main writer. In a 1904 hostile takeover involving Booker T. Washington, Fred Randolph Moore purchased the magazine and replaced Hopkins as editor.

== History ==
The Colored American Magazine was founded by Harper S. Fortune (1873–1903), Walter Alexander Johnson, Walter W. Wallace, and Jesse W. Watkins—all Virginians in their late twenties who had moved to Boston. Wallace was the managing editor, and Fortune was the treasurer.

The magazine was published by the Colored Co-Operative Publishing Company. A promotional piece declared, "This magazine shall be devoted to the higher culture of Religion, Literature, Science, Music, and Art of the Negro, universally. Acting as a stimulus to old and young, the old to higher achievements, the young to emulate their example." After its first year, the magazine had layout, prose, photography, and production values that were professional and indicated solid finances.

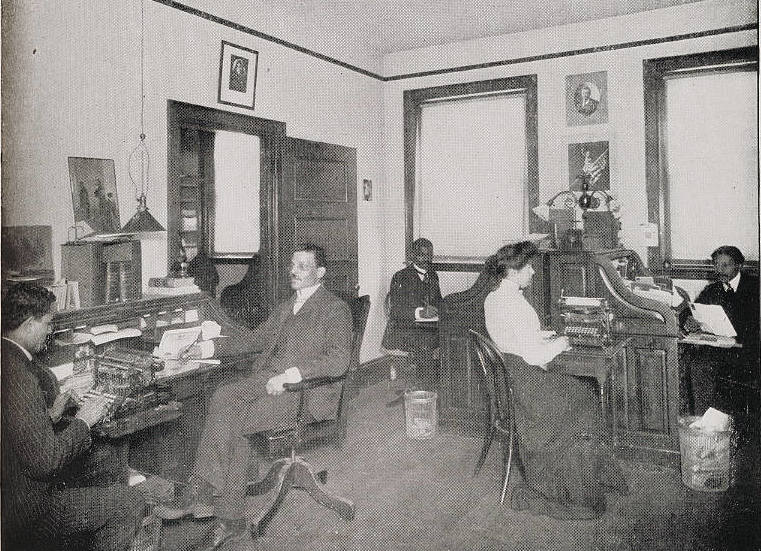
Park Square office, 1902

Originally, the magazine operated at 232 West Canton Street in Boston's South End; it moved to 5 Park Square in Boston by 1902. It had 15,000 subscriptions by 1901 at one dollar each; its national circulation peaked at 17,000. Although its target audience was African Americans, at least a third of its readers were White. Its inclusion of serialized novels, short stories, and poems turned it into a "quality journal" that appealed to "Boston's Smart Set."

Despite these successes, the magazine had financial problems as early as August 1900. These problems were linked to poverty in the African American community and an unwillingness of white banks to finance a risky project managed by an African American team. Wallace also cited the company's venture into book publishing as a constraint on its liquidity.

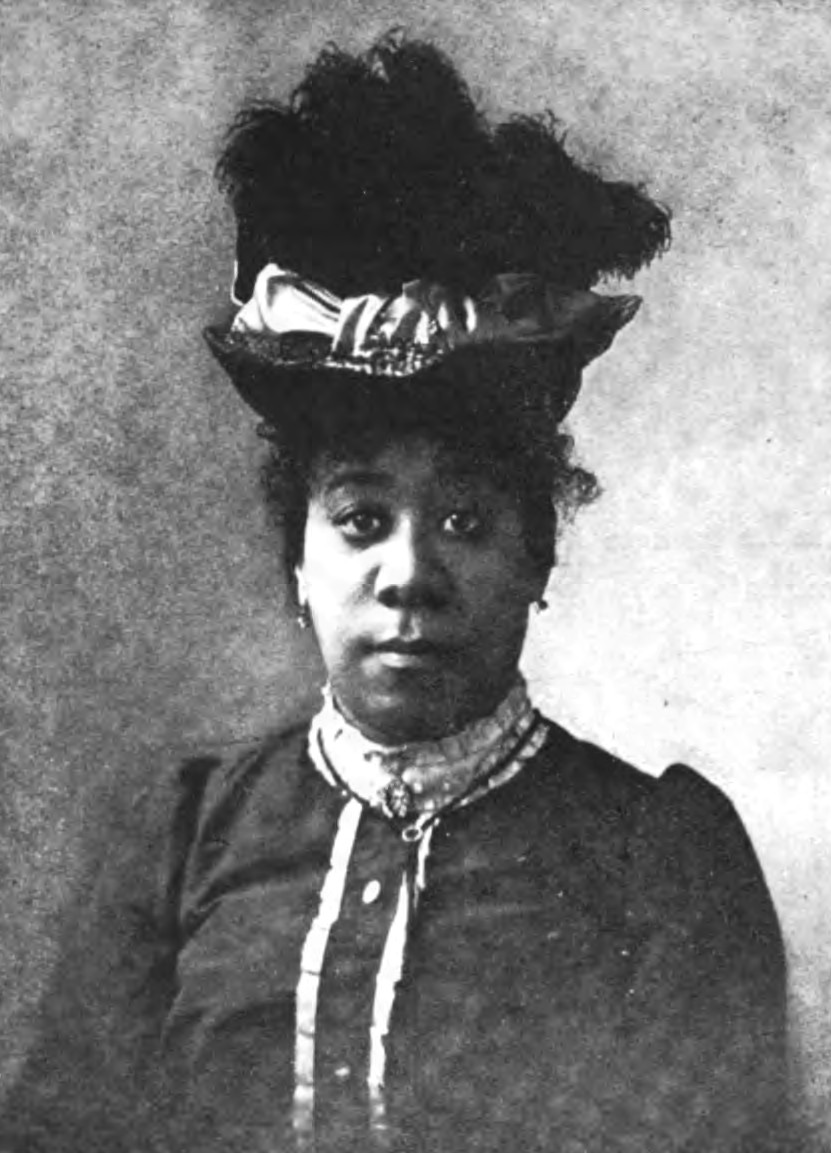
Pauline Hopkins. c. 1901

Novelist Pauline Hopkins was the magazine's most prolific contributor from 1900 to 1904. She used literary texts to advocate for African American equality, writing biographical essays, serialized novels, and short stories for the magazine. A modern historian notes, "Hopkins, in contrast to some other figures attached to the magazine, was uncompromising in her critique of racial oppression in Jim Crow America, as well as in what she perceived as the moral cowardice and racial paternalism of white Northern liberals."

Other contributors to The Colored American Magazine included Cyrus Field Adams, William Stanley Braithwaite, James D. Corrothers, W. E. B. Du Bois, Paul Laurence Dunbar, T. Thomas Fortune, William Lloyd Garrison, Angelina Grimké, Charles Winslow Hall, Fred R. Moore, Maitland Leroy Osborne, J. Alexandre Skeete, Albreta (Alberta) Moore Smith, Moorfield Storey, Marie Louise Burgess-Ware, Booker T. Washington, Gertrude Dorsey Brown and Ella Wheeler Wilcox. Hopkins became the women's section editor in 1901 and literary editor in May 1903. Braithwaite recalled that Hopkins introduced paying writers for their stories and poems to attract better writers.

In 1903, John Christian Freund became an outside investor in the magazine. London-born and Oxford-educated, Freund was the co-founder and editor of two magazines in New York City, The Music Trades and Musical America. At the time, his investment in the magazine was crucial. As a White man, Freund preferred Booker T. Washington's "racially conciliatory rhetoric" and pressured Hopkins to move away from what he considered to be a "militant political stance". Hopkins did not comply, refusing to change the magazine to please its backers.

=== Sale to Dupree, Watkins, and West ===
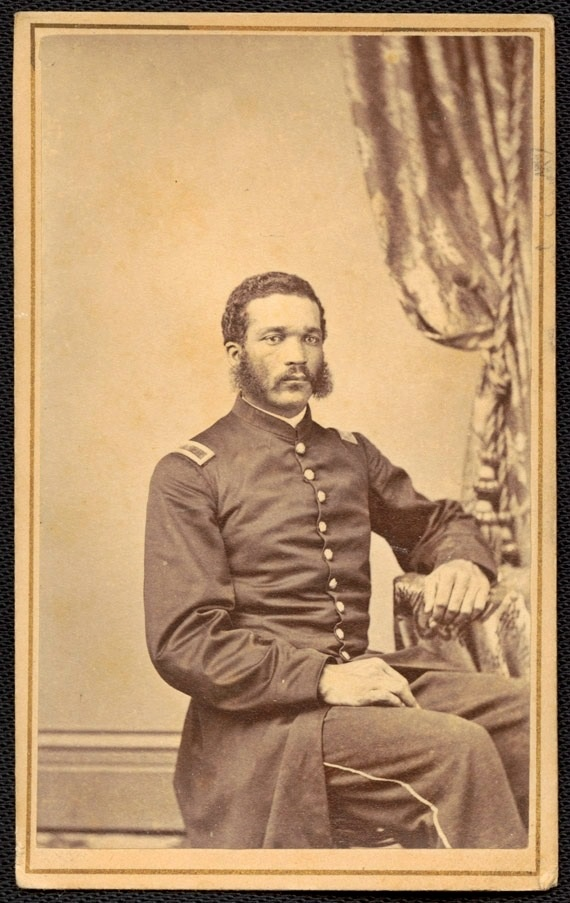
2nd Lt. William H. Dupree (April 1, 1865)

On May 15, 1903, William H. Dupree (1838–1934), Jesse W. Watkins, and William O. West purchased the magazine from The Colored Co-Operative Publishing Company and renamed the holding company The Colored American Publishing Company. Dupree was a member of the National Negro Business League and became a major investor. They aimed to financially redeem the magazine and secure its location in Boston with Pauline Hopkins as editor. This put Hopkins at the center of a national debate about racial activism and the women's movement. Hopkins called attention to social injustice by detailing rapes, lynchings, and Northern job discrimination.

=== Sale to Moore ===
In late April 1904, Fred R. Moore bought The Colored American Publishing Company and magazine, becoming general manager and editor. Moore was the recording secretary of the National Negro Business League, an organization financed and supported by Booker T. Washington. However, the extent of Washington's involvement in the transaction is unknown; he denied rumors in 1903 saying that he had invested a significant sum in an African American magazine. Later, Washington did admit to owning stock in the magazine; it was also revealed that he invested $3,000 in the company in 1904. Braithwaite, who was there at the time, wrote that Moore was under the control of Washington.

Moore moved the magazine's office to Pearl Street in New York City, where it was published by Moore Publishing and Printing Company. Although Hopkins moved to New York City where she earned $12 a week, she later learned about meetings and decisions made behind the scenes by Washington and his allies. She was soon "pushed out as editor" and was replaced by Moore. The May 1904 issue is the first that included no articles credited to Moore. In the next issue, her name is removed from the mast, leaving just Moore as editor. The November 1904 issue stated, "On account of ill-health, Miss Pauline Hopkins has found it necessary to sever her relations with this Magazine and has returned to her home in Boston. Miss Hopkins was a faithful and conscientious worker and did much toward the [sic] building up the Magazine. We take this means of expressing our appreciation of her services, and wish for her a speedy return to complete health”.

Without Hopkins as editor, the magazine was significantly different. The new editorial policy was announced in the May 1904 issue. Its articles were more middle-of-the-road politically, no longer focused on issues affecting women, and no longer used literature for political engagement. Hopkins's "genteel radicalism" was replaced by Washington's "conciliatory politics". Editorially, Moore devoted less space to racial injustice, favoring coverage of African American accomplishments, especially in business and education, and fraternal orders like the Elks and Masons. The magazine announced that it "is explicitly not focused on activism" and created a new motto, "Prejudice will be erased through education, character, and money."

Its circulation dropped; in New York, it went from 800–1,200 a month to 200 a month. W. E. B. Du Bois wrote in The Crisis magazine, a magazine that used Hopkins's model of literature and activism, that the Colored American, became “so conciliatory, innocuous, uninteresting that it died a peaceful death almost unnoticed by the public”. The Colored American Magazine ceased publication with the November 1909 issue.

== The hostile takeover ==
After the rediscovery of twenty letters in the Pauline Hopkins Collection at the Fisk University Library around 1996, scholars have suggested that Hopkins was aware that Freund had conspired with Booker T. Washington to replace her as editor. Hopkins documented her experiences with a letter she sent to William Monroe Trotter, writing:

Herewith, I send you a detailed account of my experiences with the Colored American Magazine as its editor and, incidentally, with Mr. Booker T. Washington in the taking over of the magazine to New York by his agents. It is necessarily long and perhaps tedious at the outset, but I trust that you will peruse it to the end. I have held these facts for a year, but as my rights are ignored in my own property, and I am persistently hedged about by the revengeful tactics of Mr. Washington's men, I feel I must ask the advice of some one who will give me a respectful hearing, and judgment as to the best way to deal with this complicated case.

At the time, discussions about racial discrimination were a prevailing taboo in the minds of many whites; Freund, a white man, prevailed against Hopkins. The letters reveal that Hopkins was a victim of sexism and nuanced racism masked by the enlisted cooperation of Washington. It is speculated that Freund believed, and perhaps Washington also believed, that directness about race issues and racial activism by the magazine would generate greater societal discord and harm the economic viability of the magazine by limiting its white readership

Strangely enough, in February 1904, Freund showered Hopkins with gifts, including flowers, furs, and books. Hopkins was uncomfortable with his attention and later said, "As I am not a woman who attracts the attention of the opposite sex in any way, Mr. Freund's philanthropy with regards to myself puzzled me, but knowing that he was aware of my burdens at home, I thought he was trying to help me in his way. I was so dense that I did not for a moment suspect that I was being politely bribed to give up my race work and principles and adopt the plans of the South for the domination of the Blacks."

In a letter to Dupree, Freund wrote, "I have also written to Miss Hopkins, urging her to do her utmost to keep out of the magazine anything that might be construed into antagonism of the whites. We must take a higher ground in order to disarm opposition and bring out the good will of the white people who are not only with you now, but have always been with you only you have not known it." Freud also noted that the magazine should include less literature and critical articles and more "news and essays about famous men and women, organizations, and universities." He also wanted more articles that showed what African Americans "were doing for themselves; how they are raising themselves up...." In another letter, Freund admits his dislike of literature. He also told Hopkins, "There must not be a word on lynching, no mentions of our wrongs as a race, nothing that would be of offense to the South."

Freund felt that the goal of the magazine was to "first—record the work the colored people are doing; second—to make the whites acquainted with it." Freund opposed writers who felt that advancement required historic retrospection. In a letter dated April 6, 1904, he writes, "Either Miss Hopkins will follow our suggestions...and put live matter into the magazine, eliminating anything, which may create offense, stop talking about wrongs and a proscribed race, or you must count me out absolutely from this day forth. I will neither personally endorse nor help a business proposition, which my common sense tells me is foredoomed to failure. Every person I have spoken to on the subject is with me. It is Mr. Booker T. Washington's idea."

At a January 1904 dinner of African American business leaders including Hopkins and Dupree present, Freud made a speech saying, "I took an ever increasing interest in what is called the colored race problem, not because, let me be frank, I have any particular interest in the colored people as such, but because of the principles that have appealed to me, and because I believed a man should be what he makes himself, whether his face be white or black, his hair straight or kinky, his eyes blue or brown, whether his nose curves one way or the other." Hopkins believed that Freund's altruistic gestures towards her and the magazine were a ploy to oust her and take control of the magazine's political content, partly because she published William Lloyd Garrison's critique of industrialized education and an article against President Theodore Roosevelt's Philippines policy in April 1904. This belief seems confirmed when Freud tells her to stop covering international news and stick to the successes of the people of the United States. In addition, Washington had a solid political relationship with Roosevelt, including advising him on appointments of African Americans. She also said that Freud "held with each one of us the patriarchal relation of ancient days"; or as she more bluntly stated "paternalism."

Ultimately, Hopkins blamed Washington for the situation, writing, "With the knowledge with which we possess, can we be expected to worship Mr. Washington as a pure and noble soul? Can we be expected to join in paeans of praise to his spotless character and high principles? One cannot help a feeling of honest indignation and contempt for a man who would be party to defraud a helpless race of an organ of free speech, a band of men their legal property and a woman of her means of earning a living."

== Impact and legacy ==
By publishing poetry and fiction written by African Americans and biographies and news reports about successful African Americans, The Colored American Magazine countered negative stereotypes. It also covered aspects of history that were overlooked by other publications and put African American women's issues in the foreground. Even the magazine's advertising pages were influential, "reflecting and constructing an aspirational Black middle-class identity." The Colored American Magazine built a market and was a model for other magazines such as The Crisis and Ebony.

The magazine was one of the few voices in America that stood up against lynching and called out liberal Northerners for not doing more. It denounced the South's racist laws and the Supreme Court for its actions regarding the Fourteenth and Fifteenth Amendments.
