= Gertrude LeRoy Brown =

American librarian and photographer (1870–1934)

- Born: December 28, 1869
- Died: September 29, 1934 (aged 64)
- Education: Northwestern University
- Occupations: Librarian and photographer
- Movement: Pictorialism

Gertrude LeRoy Brown (28 December 1869 – 29 September 1934) was an American librarian and photographer.

== Early life and career ==
Gertrude LeRoy Brown was born on 28 December 1869. Her parents died shortly after her birth, and she was adopted by Charles and Celia F. Brown of Evanston, Illinois. She did not know this until Celia Brown was nearing her own death in 1896, and never knew the names of her parents.

She was educated in Evanston, before studying philosophy, political economy, and English literature at Northwestern University, earning her bachelor's degree in 1892. She stayed at Northwestern for graduate study until 1895, after which she took on the role of librarian at Evanston Free Library. She worked there until her death at 64, focusing particularly on music, a personal passion.

One major project completed by Brown while at the library was cataloguing the Sadie Knowland Coe Memorial Music Collection.

== Photography ==
Clarence H. White, Gertrude Käsebier, and students at the Summer School of Photography, Five Islands, Maine by Gertrude L. Brown

Brown studied photography with the influential pictorialist photographer Clarence Hudson White. The connection to White, and decision to study at his School of Photography, might have arisen through George Coe (husband of Sadie Coe), who knew White. She may have attended the School's summer session in Maine in 1914, a year Max Weber attended, and enrolled in the New York-based school that fall. She was a student of White's in 1915, when she was 45, and one of her works was featured in an exhibition of pictorial photographs White organized at the Print Gallery, 707 Fifth Avenue. A portrait of Weber created by Brown, a "daring" work which "combines a full-length view of Weber standing in a doorway with a near-profile close-up of his face" in is the collection of the Museum of Modern Art.

Describing work of Brown's featured in the Pittsburgh Salon in 1916, W. Н. Porterfield wrote: "The six prints by Gertrude LeRoy Brown possess good quality and are well composed and convey perfectly the message of the artist." At the Pittsburgh Salon of 1924, two platinum prints of Brown's were described as "worthy representatives of that beautiful printing-medium".

In 1917, a work by Brown called 'By the Sea' was exhibited in a White School alumni association exhibition. The following year, she joined the newly formed Pictorial Photographers of America (PPA). In 1920, 'A Moment's Rest' (possibly a self-portrait) was shown as part of the PPA's first annual exhibition.

Brown's work has been featured in two exhibitions at MOMA: Modern Photographs from the Thomas Walther Collection, 1909–1949 (2014–2015), and Pictures by Women: A History of Modern Photography (2010–2011).

== Legacy ==
Gertrude LeRoy Brown was killed in a car accident in September 1934. Although prior to hear death she had indicated a wish to leave her property to the library, she had not made a will.

Her obituary in the Evanston News described “the art of photography” as Brown's “avocation.” Bonnie Yochelson, in an biography for MOMA, described her as "a conventional amateur who found personal expression in Pictorial photography."
