= Houston A. Baker Jr. =

American scholar and professor (born 1943)

- Born: March 22, 1943 (age 83); Louisville, Kentucky, U.S.
- Occupations: Writer, academic

Academic background
- Education: Howard University (A.B.); University of California, Los Angeles (M.A.), (Ph.D.)

Academic work
- Institutions: Vanderbilt University; Duke University; University of Pennsylvania; University of Virginia; Yale University

Houston Alfred Baker Jr. (born March 22, 1943), an American scholar specializing in African-American literature, is Professor Emeritus Distinguished University Professor of English at Vanderbilt University. Baker served as president of the Modern Language Association and editor of the journal American Literature, along with authoring several books, including The Journey Back: Issues in Black Literature and Criticism, Modernism and the Harlem Renaissance (1987), Blues, Ideology, and Afro-American Literature (1984), and Workings of the Spirit: The Poetics of Afro-American Women's Writing (1993), and editing literary collections. Baker was included in the 2006 textbook Fifty Key Literary Theorists, by Richard J. Lane.

== Early life ==
Baker was born and raised in Louisville, Kentucky, a city he later described as "racist" and "stultifying". The racism and violence he claims to have experienced as a youth would later prompt him to conclude: "I had been discriminated against and called 'Nigger' enough to think that what America needed was a good Black Revolution." He more recently revised that judgment in his 2007 book combining memoir and critique titled I Don't Hate the South (Oxford University Press).

== Academic career ==
Baker's academic career initially progressed along traditional lines. He earned a B.A. in English literature from Howard University and an M.A. and Ph.D. in Victorian literature from the UCLA. He began teaching at Yale University and intended to write a biography of Oscar Wilde. In 1970, Baker joined the University of Virginia's Center for Advanced Studies, and from 1974 to 1977 he directed the University of Pennsylvania's Afro-American Studies Program.

From 1977 to 1999, Baker was a professor of English at the University of Pennsylvania. Starting in 1982, he was the Albert M. Greenfield Professor of Human Relations, and in 1987 he founded the university's Center for the Study of Black Literature and Culture, serving as the center's director until 1999.

From 1999 to 2006, Baker was the Susan Fox and George D. Beischer Professor of English and editor of American Literature at Duke University. In 2006, after controversy surrounding his comments on the Duke lacrosse case, he became a Distinguished University Professor at Vanderbilt University.

== Literary scholarship ==
Baker's work in African-American literary studies has been called "groundbreaking" for his ability to connect theory about the texts with the historical conditions of the beginning of the African-American community, namely, both their uprooting from Africa and their ability to maintain their African heritage through an emphasis on spirituality and on autobiography, which allowed them to "reinforce and reinvent self-worth in the midst of their debasement". His work in the 1970s focused on locating and mapping the origins of the "black aesthetic", such as found in the Black Arts Movement and the attendant development of anthologies, journals and monographs about African-American literature.

Baker's breakthrough work was 1980's The Journey Back: Issues in Black Literature and Criticism, in which he critiques earlier discussions of the black aesthetic and calls for an interdisciplinary approach that would focus on the context of the literary works, which he claims are always "in motion".

Baker argues that the attempts to forge a black aesthetic in the 1960s were not simply descriptive, but actively creative and thus based on—and distorted by—the writers' idealism. Baker offers history as a corrective, arguing that the black community has always created art forms in the face of oppression and that black artists need to "journey back" in order to "re-affirm the richness and complexity" of black aesthetic history and to recuperate lost aesthetic forms.

Baker used this approach in his 1987 study, Modernism and the Harlem Renaissance, in which he takes black critics to task for accepting the common notion that the Harlem Renaissance was a failure and then shows how notions of modernism based on European and Angloamerican texts are "inappropriate for understanding Afro-American modernism". He argues that by examining the literature of the Harlem Renaissance in conversation with contemporaneous developments in African-American music, art and philosophy, we can identify the development of "new modes of production" that lead to a rebirth; Baker calls these modes "blues geographies". Baker points to Booker T. Washington's 1895 Exposition address as the beginning of African-American modernist concerns, in that Washington both adopted and subverted a minstrel mask, thus creating a post-slavery African-American trope that is both useful and restrictive.

In Modernism and the Harlem Renaissance, Baker argued for the importance of oral culture in the black aesthetic tradition, an idea he develops in his work on African-American feminists in the essay "There Is No More Beautiful Way: Theory and the Poetics of Afro-American Women's Writing", which stresses the connection between oral culture and autobiography.

Baker's 1984 book, Blues, Ideology, and Afro-American Literature: A Vernacular Theory, had also developed his ideas about blues geographies and about orality, but had joined these ideas with developments in post-structuralism, borrowing from the work of Hegel and Derrida to argue that blues music is a "matrix", a code that acts as the foundation for African-American artistic production insofar as blues music synthesizes numerous types of early African-American oral genres; he develops this notion of "blues geography" through his reading of key works by Frederick Douglass, Zora Neale Hurston, Richard Wright, Ralph Ellison, Amiri Baraka, and Toni Morrison.

Richard J. Lane claims, in his analysis of Baker's contributions, that Baker's ability to connect literary theory with vernacular literature and to keep that combination connected to the material conditions of black life in the USA "provides a pedagogical model for [...] new ways of reading literature in general".

== Views on race ==
Holding "an exceedingly pessimistic view of American social progress where race is concerned," Baker has written many books on African Americans in modern American society. In Turning South Again: Rethinking Modernism/Rereading Booker T (2001), Baker suggests that being a black American, even a successful one, amounts to a kind of prison sentence.

Baker also harshly criticized then-Senator Barack Obama's widely praised race-centered speech ("A More Perfect Union") stemming from controversial remarks given by his pastor: "Sen. Obama's 'race speech' at the National Constitution Center, draped in American flags, was reminiscent of the Parthenon concluding scene of Robert Altman's Nashville: a bizarre moment of mimicry, aping Martin Luther King Jr., while even further distancing himself from the real, economic, religious and political issues so courageously articulated by King from a Birmingham jail. In brief, Obama's speech was a pandering disaster that threw, once again, his pastor under the bus."

== 2006 Duke University lacrosse case ==
During the 2006 Duke University lacrosse case, Baker published an open letter calling for Duke to dismiss the team and its players. Baker claimed that "white, male, athletic privilege" was responsible for the alleged rape. Baker suggested that the Duke administration was "sweeping things under the rug". More generally, Baker's letter criticized colleges and universities for the "blind-eyeing of male athletes, veritably given license to rape, maraud, deploy hate speech, and feel proud of themselves in the bargain."

Duke Provost Peter Lange responded to Baker's letter a few days later, criticizing Baker for prejudging the team based on their race and gender, citing this as a classic tactic of racism.

In 2007, charges against the players were dropped and the state's Attorney General took the extraordinary step of declaring the students innocent.

Following the exoneration of the players, one of the parents of a Duke lacrosse player emailed Baker and reported that he responded by writing that, despite exoneration, and Mangums' arrest, she was "quite sadly, mother of a 'farm animal'".

== Works ==
- Long Black Song: Essays in Black American Literature and Culture, Charlottesville: University Press of Virginia, 1972.
- Singers of Daybreak: Studies in Black American Literature, Washington: Howard University Press, 1974.
- A Many-Colored Coat of Dreams: The Poetry of Countee Cullen, Detroit: Broadside Press, 1974.
- (With Charlotte Pierce-Baker), Renewal: A Volume of Black Poems, Philadelphia: Afro-American Studies Program, University of Pennsylvania, 1977.
- No Matter Where You Travel, You Still Be Black (Poems), Detroit: Lotus Press, 1979.
- The Journey Back: Issues in Black Literature and Criticism. University of Chicago Press, 1980.
- Spirit Run (poems), Detroit: Lotus Press, 1982.
- Blues, Ideology, and Afro-American Literature: A Vernacular Theory. University of Chicago Press, 1984.
- Modernism and the Harlem Renaissance. University of Chicago Press, 1987.
- Workings of the Spirit: The Poetics of Afro-American Women's Writing. University of Chicago Press, 1993.
- Black Studies, Rap, and the Academy. University of Chicago Press, 1993.
- Turning South Again: Re-Thinking Modernism/Re-Reading Booker T. Duke University Press, 2001.
- Betrayal: How Black Intellectuals Have Abandoned the Ideals of the Civil Right Era (American Book Award), 2009.
- The Trouble with Post-Blackness Columbia University Press, 2015.

=== As editor ===
- Black Literature in America, New York: McGraw-Hill, 1971.
- Twentieth-Century Interpretations of Native Son, Englewood Cliffs, NJ: Prentice-Hall, 1972.
- Reading Black: Essays in the Criticism of African, Caribbean, and Black American Literature, Ithaca, NY: Cornell University (Africana Studies and Research Center Monograph Series, no. 4), 1976.
- A Dark and Sudden Beauty: Two Essays in Black American Poetry by George Kent and Stephen Henderson, Philadelphia: Afro-American Studies Program, University of Pennsylvania, 1977.
- (With Leslie Fiedler) English Literature: Opening Up the Canon, Baltimore: The Johns Hopkins University Press, 1981.
- Three American Literatures: Essays in Chicano, Native American, and Asian American Literature for Teachers of American Literature, New York: Modern Language Association of American, 1982; paper edition from MLA, 1983.
- Narrative of the Life of Frederick Douglass, An Americana Slave, New York: Penguin, 1982; Ebook 2013.
- (With Patricia Redmond) Afro-American Literary Study in the 1990s, Chicago: University of Chicago Press, 1989.
- Unsettling Blackness, Special Issue of American Literature devoted to Afro-American Literary Studies, 2000.
- (With Dana Nelson) Violence, the Body, and the South, Special Issue of American Literature, 2001.
- Erasing the Commas: RaceGenderClassSexualityRegion, Special Issue of American Literature (March, 2005).
- The Trouble with Post-Blackness, Columbia University Press, 2015.
