= David Hurwitz (music critic) =

American music critic (born 1961)

- Born: August 29, 1961 (age 64); Wilmington, Delaware, US
- Occupations: Music critic; author

YouTube information
- Channel: The Ultimate Classical Music Guide by Dave Hurwitz
- Subscribers: 75.3 thousand
- Views: 41.6 million
- Last updated: 9 June 2026
- Website: classicstoday.com

David Hurwitz (born 29 August 1961) is an American music critic and author who specializes in classical music. Based in New York, Hurwitz is the founder and executive editor of ClassicsToday.com and frequently reviews recordings there. He was the chairman of the Cannes Classical Awards, while they existed, from 1994 to 2010.

Hurwitz has published numerous books, primarily guides on specific composers for the Amadeus Press "Unlocking the Masters" series, namely Mahler, Mozart, Dvořák, Haydn, Shostakovich, Sibelius, Bernstein, Strauss, C. P. E. Bach, and Handel. Other publications include an introduction to classical music, two articles on the 19th-century use of vibrato as well as surveys on the symphonies of Beethoven (the 5th and 7th) and Brahms (all four).

== Life and career ==
David Hurwitz was born on 29 August 1961, in Wilmington, Delaware, United States. Raised in Connecticut, Hurwitz attended Johns Hopkins University and Stanford University, receiving graduate degrees in Modern European History from both. He has, at various times, studied piano, clarinet, viola, and percussion. He was an orchestral percussionist, with performing credits that include "all of [Mahler's] symphonies except for the Eighth".

Hurwitz is the founder and executive editor of ClassicsToday.com, a daily review site for classical music recordings. In addition to a written review, the site gives each recording two rankings from 1–10 in "Artistic Quality" and "Sound Quality; a 1 is defined as "unacceptable, no redeeming qualities", while a 10 represents "superior, qualities of unusual merit". Apart from frequent contributions on ClassicsToday.com, Hurwitz has published articles in CD Review, Classical Pulse!, High Fidelity, In Tune Monthly, Musical America, Opus, Stereo Review, The New York Observer, among other magazines. He was the chairman and founder of the Cannes Classical Awards (CCA), awarded at the Marché International du Disque et de l'Edition Musicale by a multinational jury of critics from around the world. The CCA existed from 1994 to 2010, until it was replaced by the Midem Classical Awards and presently, the International Classical Music Awards; Hurwitz left after 2010.

In 2020 Hurwitz launched a YouTube channel on which he regularly posts video reviews, discographical surveys and commentary about the classical music community.

== Selected writings ==
Books

- Hurwitz, David (1992). Beethoven or Bust: A Practical Guide to Understanding and Listening to Great Music. New York: Anchor Books. ISBN 978-0-385-42054-9.
- —— (2004). The Mahler Symphonies: An Owner's Manual. Unlocking the masters. Vol. 2. Pompton Plains: Amadeus Press. ISBN 978-1-57467-099-8.
- —— (2005a). Getting the Most Out of Mozart: The Instrumental Works. Unlocking the masters. Vol. 3. Pompton Plains: Amadeus Press. ISBN 978-1-57467-096-7.
- —— (2005b). Getting the Most Out of Mozart: The Vocal Works. Unlocking the masters. Vol. 4. Pompton Plains: Amadeus Press. ISBN 978-1-57467-106-3.
- —— (2005c). Dvořák: Romantic Music's Most Versatile Genius. Unlocking the masters. Vol. 5. Pompton Plains: Amadeus Press. ISBN 978-1-57467-107-0.
- —— (2005d). Exploring Haydn: A Listener's Guide to Music's Boldest Innovator. Unlocking the masters. Vol. 6. Pompton Plains: Amadeus Press. ISBN 978-1-57467-116-2.
- —— (2006). Shostakovich Symphonies and Concertos: An Owner's Manual. Unlocking the masters. Vol. 9. Pompton Plains: Amadeus Press. ISBN 978-1-57467-131-5.
- —— (2007). Sibelius: The Orchestral Works: An Owner's Manual. Unlocking the masters. Vol. 12. Pompton Plains: Amadeus Press. ISBN 978-1-57467-131-5.
- —— (2008). Beethoven's Fifth and Seventh Symphonies: A Closer Look. New York: Continuum. ISBN 978-0-8264-2944-5.
- —— (2009). Brahms' Symphonies: A Closer Look. New York: Continuum. ISBN 978-0-8264-3164-6.
- —— (2011). Bernstein's Orchestral Music: An Owner's Manual. Unlocking the masters. Vol. 22. Montclair: Amadeus Press. ISBN 978-1-57467-193-3.
- —— (2014). Richard Strauss: An Owner's Manual. Unlocking the masters. Vol. 25. Montclair: Amadeus Press. ISBN 978-1-57467-442-2.
- —— (2016). C.P.E.: A Listener's Guide to the Other Bach. Unlocking the masters. Vol. 28. Pompton Plains: Amadeus Press. ISBN 978-1-57467-467-5.
- —— (2019). Handel: An Owner's Manual. Unlocking the masters. Pompton Plains: Amadeus Press. ISBN 978-1-57467-487-3.

Articles

- Hurwitz, David (February 2012). "'So klingt Wien': Conductors, Orchestras, and Vibrato in the Nineteenth and Early Twentieth Centuries". Music and Letters. 93 (1): 29–60. doi:10.1093/ml/gcr125.
- —— (June 2014). "Vibrato, the Orchestral Organ and the 'Prevailing Aesthetic' in Nineteenth-Century Symphonic Music". Nineteenth-Century Music Review. 11 (1). Cambridge University Press: 93–112. doi:10.1017/S1479409814000160. S2CID 191397435.
