= Edna Michell =

Israeli musician

Edna Michell (Hebrew: עדנה מישל) is an Israeli-American violinist, pedagogue, and founder and director of music festivals, institutes, and concert series, known for her versatility and her efforts to expand the violin and chamber music repertoire.

== Early career ==
Michell was born in Tel Aviv, and began violin studies at the age of four with Moshe Hopenko, a pupil of Leopold Auer. She continued her studies at the Rubin Academy in Tel Aviv with Alice and Lorand Fenyves and Ödön Pártos, who were students of Jenő Hubay. At a very young age, she was awarded the Yehudi Menuhin special scholarship to continue her studies in London with Menuhin and Max Rostal (a disciple of Carl Flesch). In London, she was reportedly the youngest graduate ever of the Guildhall School of Music, and won the Academy Prize for Chamber Music. Michell later studied with Ivan Galamian in the United States, and worked with Zino Francescatti and Henryk Szeryng. Michell's integration of the Auer, Hubay, Flesch, and Galamian schools of violin methods became a decisive influence in her life of performance and teaching.

In her teens, Michell began touring internationally, performing in recitals and with orchestras in Great Britain, Europe and Central and South America. Following Michell's London debut at Wigmore Hall, Menuhin presented her with a Vincenzo Rugeri violin. Claudio Arrau, upon hearing her, wrote that "She is a splendid musician and has the approach of a serious dedicated artist. Hers is a natural gift for the instrument..." Arrau's efforts enabled Michell to make her New York debut at Town Hall. Michell has performed as a duo with harpsichordist Fernando Valenti and with classical guitarist Rey de la Torré.

== Adirondack–Champlain Festival ==
Michell was artistic director of the Adirondack–Champlain Festival. The festival began as a weekend of concerts and expanded into a summer-long lineup of events and programs throughout the region. Festival performers included Michael Rabin, Julius Katchen, Gary Graffman, Claude Frank, János Starker, Aldo Parisot, Ivan Moravec, and Valenti. String quartets that performed included the Amadeus, Guarneri, Hungarian, and Emerson, and other groups that performed included the Cantilena Chamber Players/Cantilena Piano Quartet, and the Beaux Arts Trio. Other performing artists included the dancers Melissa Hayden, Patricia McBride, Jacques D' Amboise and Edward Villella, and folk singers Odetta and Pete Seeger.

The Festival included an Institute of Advanced Musical Studies with Michell, Starker, Parisot, Roman Totenberg, György Sebők and Walter Trampler, and Symposia on Music Criticism and New Music led by Virgil Thomson, George Crumb, Lukas Foss, and Alfred Frankenstein, among others. Of the symposia, Frankenstein wrote in Musical America that "both programs bore the same rubric: the contemporary musical experience. They may not have defined all the contemporary musical experience, but what they did define was so beautiful and so magnificently brought of that one wished for nothing else. Modern music was superlatively well served." Newsweek described the festival as "informal but highly sophisticated".

== Cantilena Chamber Players/Cantilena Piano Quartet ==
Michell was the founder and guiding spirit of the Cantilena Chamber Players/Cantilena Piano Quartet, an ensemble known for performing well-known masterworks, premiering new compositions, and reviving forgotten or lesser-known masterworks from the 19th century re-discovered by Michell. She inspired over twenty composers to write new compositions for the ensemble. The Cantilena Chamber Players/ Cantilena Piano Quartet has performed around the world, including the Helena Rubinstein Concerts, a series founded by Michell. Cantilena, with Menuhin, was invited to perform a special concert at the Lake Placid Winter Olympics.

== Reception ==
Michell has received outstanding reviews throughout her career. Music and Musicians described her as "a violinist of rare gifts", and the Montreal Star wrote that "her thrilling tone has a vibrancy which sends chills down one's back and she is in possession of a technique which is quite stunning in its virtuosity." The Strad wrote that "Michell, in particular, has the same ability to soar rasphodically above the bar lines that made Menuhin's own violin playing so eloquent and memorable." Of a performance in Mexico, Novadades wrote that "[She] captivated the audience. Edna Michell's violin sings, translating deep sorrow and great happiness."

== Collaboration ==
Michell maintained a collaborative relationship with her mentor Menuhin, which included a wide variety of musical projects, performances in concert halls, television programs, and recordings. Their recordings included Orpheus and Euridice by Foss, dedicated to Michell and Menuhin, and La muse et le poète by Camille Saint-Saëns, and Concertino for Piano Trio and String Orchestra by Bohuslav Martinů.

== Compassion Through Music ==
Michell's recent activities include Compassion Through Music, an ongoing project she created with Menuhin. Leading composers from around the world have written new works inspired by the theme of universal compassion. The project reflects Michell and Menuhin's belief that compassion is critical to the fate of humanity and that through music, listeners may be moved to connect more deeply with others.

Twenty-five composers have contributed pieces to the project, including Foss, Steve Reich, Philip Glass, John Tavener, Chen Yi, Somei Satoh, Wolfgang Rihm, Hans Werner Henze, Boris Tishchenko, Poul Ruders, Kaija Saariaho, Petr Eben, Josef Tal, Iannis Xenakis, György Kurtág, Yinam Leef, Shulamit Ran, and Karel Husa.

A CD of the first fifteen pieces composed for the project, entitled Compassion, was released by EMI. It was praised by critics, with Edward Greenfield writing in Gramophone that "It is due to the energy and application of the violinist Edna Michell that this impressive collection of pieces was written by leading composers ... With excellent playing from Michell and all the contributors, it is a memorable, very well-recorded disc." A second CD is forthcoming.

== Other activities ==
Michell has taught at the Yehudi Menuhin Schools in England and Switzerland, Manhattan School of Music, SUNY Purchase, and is on the faculty of the Mannes College of Music. She has conducted master classes around the world, and has frequently served as a jury member of international violin competitions. Michell and the Cantilena Chamber Players / Cantilena Piano Quartet recorded for Arabesque, EMI/Angel, Grenadilla, Musical Heritage, New World Records, Point, Pro Arte and Supraphon. Michell plays J.B. Guadagnini 1769 and Samuel Zygmuntowicz 1996 violins.
