= Cantilena Chamber Players =

The Cantilena Chamber Players/Cantilena Piano Quartet was an ensemble founded and led by Edna Michell that included pianist Frank Glazer, violist Harry Zaratzian (later Jessie Levine and Phillip Naegele), cellist Paul Olefsky (later Stephen Kates, Marcy Rosen, Hakuro Mori, and Steven Thomas), and mezzo-soprano Elaine Bonazzi.

The ensemble was known for performing well-known masterworks and new music, and reviving lesser-known and forgotten masterworks rediscovered by Michell in libraries, shops, and private collections in Europe and America. These rediscovered works included piano quartets by Sergei Taneyev, Gustav Mahler, Alfred Schnittke, Camille Saint-Saëns, and Vincent d’Indy, among others. Michell inspired over twenty compositions to be written, premiered and recorded by the ensemble including works by Josef Tal, Morton Feldman, Lukas Foss, Yehudi Wyner, Herman D. Koppel, Robert Starer, Tzvi Avni, Ben-Zion Orgad and Ödön Pártos. Partos’ was inspired after he and Michell were sitting on a balcony overlooking the Old City of Jerusalem when both were struck by the six o’clock toll of the Christian Church bells and the call of the muezzin. Partos asked Michell what the notes were, and Michell identified them and suggested that Partos begin his new piece with the very same notes. A few months later, Michell received the “Balada for Piano Quartet,” which begins and ends with the notes of the bells. She called Partos to thank him only to learn that he had died three days earlier, just after completing the composition. With a special grant from the Helena Rubinstein Foundation, Michell founded the Helena Rubinstein concerts for performances of contemporary music by Cantilena at major art museums, including the Corcoran Gallery, and the Guggenheim, Hirshhorn, and Tel Aviv Museums. Foss composed “Round A Common Center” for the Cantilena Chamber Players and Yehudi Menuhin for the opening of the Winter Olympics at Lake Placid. A documentary film, “Olympic Overture,” was produced and broadcast on PBS. “Round A Common Center” was later recorded with narration by Orson Welles.

The Cantilena Chamber Players/Cantilena Piano Quartet received major acclaim from critics the world over. They were featured in articles including pieces by Shirley Fleming in Musical America and Harold Schonberg in The New York Times, and were described by Stereo Review as “a first-rate piano quartet.” Politiken praised Cantilena’s “splendid, wonderfully stirring, passionate performances,” and the London Sunday Times described them as “a piano quartet of outstanding quality,” that gave a “breathlessly exhilarating performance.” The Washington Post wrote that “Among the excellent chamber music performances at the Library of Congress, an occasional one positively glitters. Last night’s concert by the Cantilena Chamber Players did just that!”
