= James R. Oestreich =

American music critic

James Ruben Oestreich (born 1943) is a classical music critic for The New York Times, where he has written about music since 1989. He grew up in Wisconsin.

== Career ==
Oestreich has held earlier posts as music critic at American Record Guide, editor of High Fidelity (1979–1983), and founder-editor of Opus, a magazine of classical music record reviews.

=== Music Critics Association ===
In November 1981, while working at High Fidelity magazine, Oestreich served on the faculty of the Music Critics Association's summer institute in Pittsburgh held in conjunction with a three-program British music festival given by the Pittsburgh Orchestra under André Previn. He has since served as a panelist at annual conferences held by the association.

=== Departure from High Fidelity ===
In 1983, most of the senior music critics at High Fidelity and Musical America – including Harris Goldsmith (born 1936), Dale Harris (1928–1996), Andrew Porter, Will Crutchfield, Paul Henry Lang, Allan Kozinn, Peter G. Davis (1936–2021), Kenneth Furie (born 1949), David Peter Hamilton (born 1935), Robert P. Morgan (born 1934), and Conrad L. Osborne (born 1934) – resigned in protest over a reduction of autonomy for Oestreich, their music editor, who had been informed by the parent company that the classical music section was going to be reduced from an average of 18 pages per issue to 8 pages by January 1984, and further reduced to 1 or 2 pages by December 1984.

On behalf of the parent company, ABC Leisure Magazines of ABC Publishing, William Tynan explained that they were going to "blend lengthy classical features into its highly acclaimed Musical America," a slim magazine sewn into the centerfold of selected issues of High Fidelity and available only by subscription. Musical America, at the time, had a circulation of about 20,000 subscribers. High Fidelity had a circulation of nearly 400,000. Tynan said that High Fidelity's average reader "no longer prefers the lengthy classical music articles that have appeared as part of the previous format."

=== Founding of Opus ===
A year later (1984), many of those critics became the core review staff for a start-up classical record magazine Opus, with Oestreich as editor. The magazine, a bi-monthly, ran for four years. Historical Times, Inc., of Harrisburg, Pennsylvania, was the publisher. Warren B. Syer (1923–2007), who had published High Fidelity for 30 years, was president of Historical Times.

=== Program annotator for the Cleveland Orchestra ===
While filling in as interim editor of the Arts and Leisure section of The New York Times in September 1988, Oestreich accepted a position as program annotator for the Cleveland Orchestra. He succeeded Klaus George Roy (1924–2010), who had held the post for 30 years, and was succeeded by Peter G. Laki (born 1954), a musicologist, teacher, and singer.

=== The New York Times ===
Oestreich left his post with the Cleveland Orchestra in March 1989 to accept a permanent position as editor of arts and leisure for The New York Times. He served in this position until accepting a buyout offer in January 2013, reported as retirement from full-time work for the paper. He occasionally contributes pieces to the Times as of April 2020.

== Education ==
- 1965 – University of Wisconsin – philosophy, Phi Beta Kappa
- 1970s – 9 1/2 years of non-performance coursework at Juilliard and the Mannes School of Music
