= Isler =

Isler or İşler may refer to:

- Alan Isler, American novelist and educator
- Connie Isler, American golfer
- Cenk İşler, Turkish footballer
- Donald Isler, American pianist and music educator
- Heinz Isler, Swiss structural engineer famous for thin-shell structures
- J. J. Isler, American yachtswoman
- Gabriela Isler, Miss Venezuela 2012 and Miss Universe 2013
- Marie Anne Isler Béguin, French politician
- Nejat İşler, Turkish actor
- Samantha Isler, American actress

== See also ==
- Organize İşler, Turkish satirical black comedy movie
