= Harris Goldsmith =

American pianist, music teacher and classical music critic

Harris Goldsmith (November 23, 1935 – April 2, 2014 in New York City) was an American pianist, music teacher and classical music critic.

== Biography ==
Born in New York City, Goldsmith's family moved to Cuba for a year in 1938, to aid European Jews seeking to escape antisemitic persecution. Goldsmith studied at the Manhattan School of Music under Robert Goldsand. He earned his bachelor's and master's degrees in music from the Manhattan School of Music, where he studied with Robert Goldsand as a piano student. His early musical influences included conductors Arturo Toscanini and Guido Cantelli, and he was deeply affected by Cantelli's death in 1956.

Goldsmith, known among his peers as an opinionated musician, was recommended by one of his instructors to become a music critic. Goldsmith began writing music criticism as a record reviewer for High Fidelity in 1960, where he became an influential voice during the "heyday of the classical LP". His friends claimed that he could remember "every note of music he's ever heard". In a 2013 interview with New York City culture critic Sara Fishko, he recalled a performance by Toscanini 60 years earlier: "The one that really blew me away is the Eroica he did on December 6, 1953, because I already was well familiar with the piece from his 1949 recording". While Goldsmith could be effusive over performances, he became well known early in his criticism career for his barbed reviews. Remembering a review of Chopin preludes performed by Alexander Brailowsky, he said, "I really roasted it... I said, 'Alexander Brailowsky indulges in cliches and vagaries of taste. His performance is grotesque, fragmentary and clumsy.'" He went on to write for High Fidelity's successor publication, Musical America, as well as contributing to Opus, the New York Post, The New York Times and New York Concert Review from 1993-2014 (nyconcertreview.com). He also provided liner notes for many re-releases of classical music recordings, and organized a 12 disc set recordings by Guido Cantelli, which he annotated. He shared a 1995 Grammy Award for Best Historical Album for his liner notes accompanying The Heifetz Collection.

Goldsmith played his debut piano performance in April 1965 at New York City's Town Hall. He made a number of recordings for various record labels in the 1970s, including a collection of Beethoven sonatas, and other releases of works by Johannes Brahms, Franz Schubert and Robert Schumann.

Goldsmith was also a music teacher himself. He was a visiting professor at Binghamton University, gave classes at the Eastman School of Music, and coached students at the Yale Summer School of Music. He was a professor of music literature and chamber music at Mannes College from 1994 until his death. Students he has worked with include noted pianists Cecile Licad and Jenny Lin.
