= Compassion Through Music =

Music composition and performance project

Compassion Through Music is an ongoing project created by violinists Edna Michell and Yehudi Menuhin, in which leading composers write works inspired by the theme of universal compassion. The project reflects Michell and Menuhin’s belief that compassion is critical to the fate of humanity and that through music, listeners may be moved to connect more deeply with others.

== Origin and contributors ==
The project began with a conversation between Michell and Menuhin following a concert in Prague. Menuhin spoke with dismay about atrocities and human suffering worldwide. Michell responded by suggesting that they ask composers around the world to write works inspired by the theme of universal compassion.

Many of the world’s leading composers have contributed pieces to the project, including Lukas Foss, Steve Reich, Philip Glass, György Kurtág, Chen Yi, Somei Satoh, Wolfgang Rihm, Hans Werner Henze, Boris Tishchenko, Shulamit Ran, Yinam Leef, David Del Tredici, Foday Musa Suso, Karel Husa, Betty Olivero, Gennady Banshchikov, Oldric F. Korte, Viktor Kalabis, Poul Ruders, Kaija Saariaho, Petr Eben, Josef Tal, Iannis Xenakis, and John Tavener. Tavener, after initially telling Michell that he would need a year to compose his piece, ultimately wrote it later that night, and called Michell at 3 A.M. to review it with her.

A piece by Luciano Berio has been released by the composer's heirs as a tribute to the Compassion Project and to Berio's friendship with Menuhin and Michell.

== Performances and releases ==
Concerts of Compassion Through Music have been performed worldwide, including as the closing concert of New York’s Lincoln Center Festival at Avery Fisher Hall. Fourteen compositions were premiered with Menuhin conducting the Orchestra of St. Luke’s. Soloists included Michell, Barbara Hendricks, Ole Akahoshi, Ko Ishikawa, Richard Stoltzman, Elmar Oliveira, Shlomo Mintz, and the poet Allen Ginsberg. The concert coincided with Menuhin's 80th birthday and was his last in the United States.

Compassion Through Music was the closing concert of the cultural celebrations of the founding of St. Petersburg, Russia, and was broadcast on Russian TV from the Hermitage Museum. Other concerts included a televised memorial on the first anniversary of 9/11 in Helsinki’s Temppeliaukio Church, a highlighted concert in Israel’s Biennale for New Music, and a benefit for the Royal Academy of Music in London.

After Menuhin's death in 1999, a CD entitled Compassion: A Journey of the Spirit featuring fifteen of the first compositions was released by EMI in 2001. In the liner notes, Shirley Fleming described the music as “[communicating] directly with the listener through a spacious, meditative, transparent quality, with a sense of timelessness.”

The CD was praised by critics, with Edward Greenfield writing in Gramophone that “It is due to the energy and application of the violinist Edna Michell that this impressive collection of pieces was written by leading composers...With excellent playing from Michell and all the contributors, it is a memorable, very well-recorded disc.” Fanfare wrote that "The diversity of mood and style among these pieces reflects the inclusiveness of Menuhin’s musical taste, in addition to bringing together a group of musicians from all around the world for a common purpose. Edna Michell and her musical friends perform the music with great heart and commitment." Musicweb International wrote that "Unsurprisingly the performances are dominated by the violin playing of Michell with or without her colleagues (and these too are of the highest calibre with the likes of Hoelscher and Mintz among them)." The Los Angeles Times wrote that “...these little pieces do fit uncannily well together, with each seemingly growing out of its often unrelated predecessor," and Audiophile wrote that "All the pieces have a strongly calming and spiritual quality about them and those with lyrics are very moving.”

An anthology album called The Compassion Project was released by Innova Recordings in 2018.
