= Gathering Paradise =

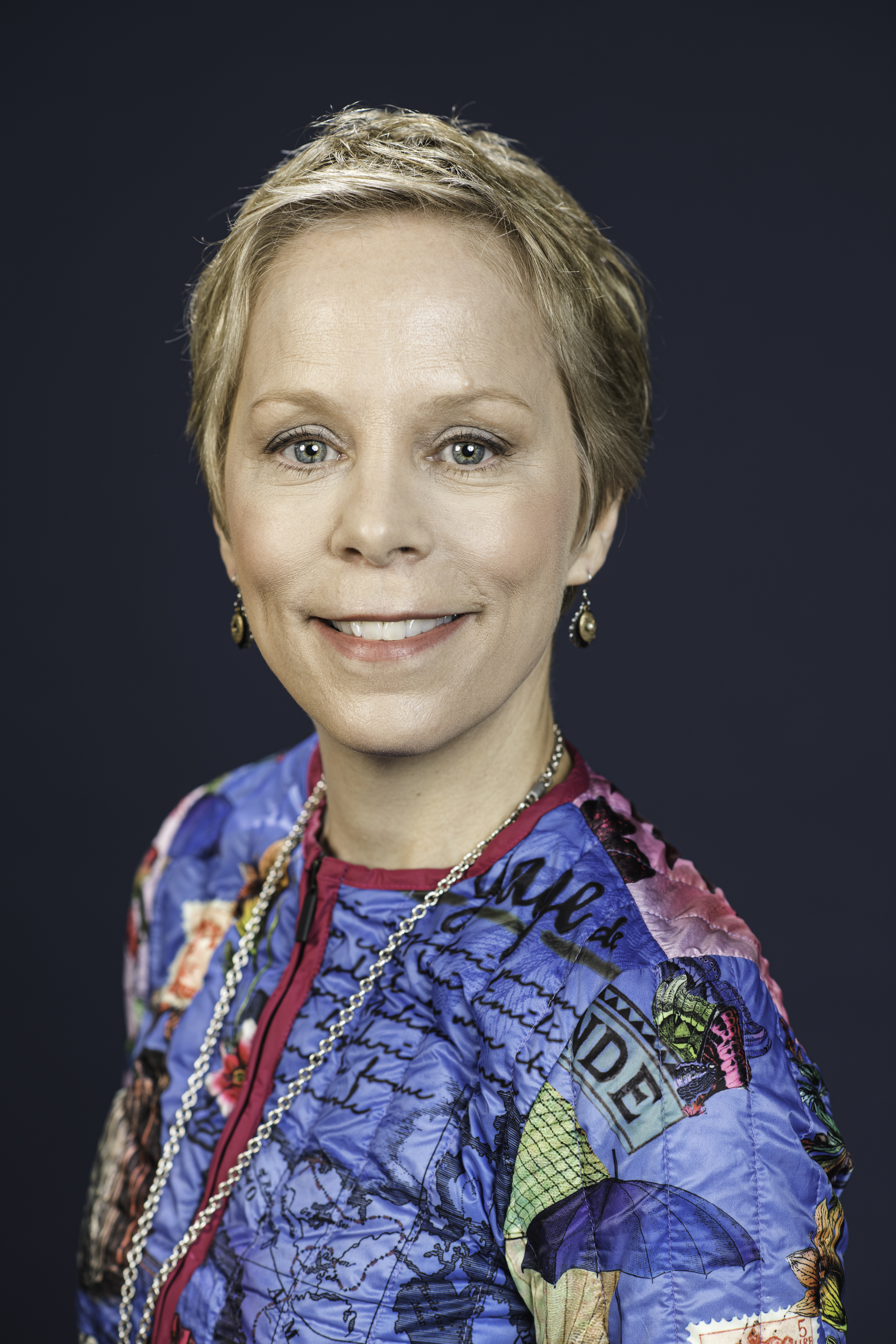
Augusta Read Thomas in 2020

Gathering Paradise is a song cycle for soprano and orchestra set to the poetry of Emily Dickinson by the American composer Augusta Read Thomas. It was written in 2004 on a commission by the New York Philharmonic under the direction of Lorin Maazel, both to which the piece is dedicated "with admiration and gratitude." Its world premiere was performed by the soprano Heidi Grant Murphy and the New York Philharmonic conducted by Maazel in Avery Fisher Hall, New York City, on September 29, 2004.

== Composition ==
Gathering Paradise is cast in one continuous movement, lasting approximately 25 minutes. The text of the piece is composed of lines from six poems by Emily Dickinson, including "The gleam of an heroic Act," "How still the Bells in Steeples stand," "It's like the Light," "The longest day that God appoints," "I dwell in Possibility," and "Image of Light, Adieu." In the score program note, Thomas described Dickinson's poems as "intensely personal, intellectual, introspective, and [offering] a meditation on life, death, and poetic creation; her poems share a close observation of nature as well as consideration of religious and philosophical issues." The composer added that she selected these poems because they share "the intimate recollection of inspirational moments which are suggestive of hope and the possibility of happiness found in art and in the observation of the natural world."

=== Instrumentation ===
The piece is scored for solo soprano and a large orchestra comprising piccolo, three flutes, two oboes, English horn, four clarinets (3rd doubling E♭ clarinet, 4th doubling bass clarinet), two bassoons (2nd doubling contrabassoon), four horns, three trumpets (1st doubling piccolo trumpet), two trombones, bass trombone, tuba, three percussionists, piano (doubling celesta), harp, and strings.

== Reception ==
Reviewing the world premiere, Anthony Tommasini of The New York Times described the music as "challenging," "notwithstanding its alluring colors, striking orchestral effects and organic energy." He elaborated, "Her musical language is unabashedly atonal, though lulling diatonic elements leaven the astringent harmonies. Still, Ms. Thomas has an acute ear. When some eerie, atmospheric chord in quiet strings and winds lingers, you can almost hear her saying, 'Just listen to that wonderful dissonance!'" Peter G. Davis of New York Magazine similarly wrote that the piece "[captures] the restless fever of this poet's style in a way that few composers ever have," adding, "The 30-minute piece deals mainly in light images, suggesting a day-to-night journey in freshly minted orchestral colors and lyrical vocal lines that make the trip compulsively listenable. To my ears, the score strongly recalls the spicy neo-impressionistic music of Thomas's husband, Bernard Rands, whose compendiums for voice and orchestra are cast in a similar style. Clearly this is a family that thinks alike."
