= Berry Fleming =

American writer

- Born: March 19, 1899; Augusta, Georgia
- Died: September 15, 1989 (aged 90); Augusta
- Resting place: Summerville Cemetery
- Education: Harvard University
- Occupations: Novelist, writer
- Children: Shirley Fleming (daughter)
- Writing career
- Years active: 1924 – 1951; 1973 – death
- Notable works: Colonel Effingham's Raid; Captain Bennett's Folly

Berry Fleming (19 March 1899 – 15 September 1989) was an American novelist. He is best known for his 1943 novel Colonel Effingham's Raid.

== Life and career ==
Fleming was born in Augusta, Georgia, and lived in that city for most of his life. In 1922 he graduated from Harvard University and in 1923 he worked as a reporter for an Augusta newspaper. In 1924 he moved to New York City to pursue his career as a writer.

His first novel, The Conqueror's Stone, was published in 1927. In the early 1930s Fleming and his wife spent 18 months living in France. They then returned to New York for a few years before returning to Augusta in 1938 where Fleming lived for the rest of his life. He enjoyed a considerable amount of success with a series of novels in the 1930s and 1940s which culminated in his 1943 work Colonel Effingham's Raid, which was made into a film. Afterward, his popularity dwindled (along with him firing of his publicist), and he abandoned writing for nearly two decades after the publication of The Fortune Tellers in 1951.

He resumed his work as a novelist with 1973's The Make Believers but struggled to regain an audience. He received a resurgence in popularity with the publication of his last novel Captain Bennett's Folly in 1989 just months before his death. The work was favorably reviewed in The New York Times among other publications, and since then many of his earlier neglected novels have been republished with more successful sales than during his lifetime.

For several years he maintained a weekly column in a Georgia newspaper. He also contributed articles to several magazines during his career, including the British satirical magazine Punch.

Fleming died of cancer in Augusta at the age of 90 and is buried in the Summerville Cemetery. His daughter was the late music critic and editor Shirley Fleming. His papers are held by the University of Georgia's Hargett Rare Book and Manuscript Library.
