= Colonel Effingham's Raid =

1946 film by Irving Pichel

- Directed by: Irving Pichel
- Written by: Kathryn Scola (writer); Berry Fleming (novel)
- Produced by: Lamar Trotti
- Starring: Charles Coburn; Joan Bennett; William Eythe
- Cinematography: Edward Cronjager
- Edited by: Harmon Jones
- Music by: Cyril J. Mockridge
- Color process: Black and white
- Production company: 20th Century Fox
- Distributed by: 20th Century Fox
- Release date: January 24, 1946
- Running time: 72 minutes
- Country: United States
- Language: English

Colonel Effingham's Raid

Colonel Effingham's Raid (UK title: Man of the Hour) is a 1946 American comedy film directed by Irving Pichel. It is also known as Berry Fleming's Colonel Effingham's Raid, Everything's Peaches Down in Georgia and Rebel Yell. The screenplay was written by Kathryn Scola, based on a 1943 novel by Berry Fleming. The music score is by Cyril J. Mockridge. The film stars Charles Coburn, Joan Bennett and William Eythe. The plot involves a retired career Army colonel who returns to his hometown, starts writing a column in a local newspaper and takes on the corrupt local politicians to not replace the historic county courthouse.

Fleming based his novel on the Cracker Party and political corruption in Richmond County, Georgia.

== Plot ==
Newly retired United States Army Colonel William Seaborn Effingham returns to his home town of Fredericksville, Georgia, in 1940. He meets his second cousin, once removed, Albert Marbury, a reporter for the Leader newspaper.

The next day, Confederate Memorial Day, Mayor Bill Silk announces he intends to rename the town Confederate Monument Square after an undistinguished deceased politician named Pud Toolen. Effingham persuades a reluctant Earl Hoats, the editor of the Leader, to let him write a war column (for free). Effingham soon attacks the mayor's plan in his column, much to Hoats' dismay. The rival News is getting most of the advertising revenue due to its friendly attitude toward the complacent local government, and Hoats had been trying to combat that.

Silk decides to use Effingham, agreeing to the latter's beautification scheme for the square, but also deciding to tear down the old courthouse (and giving his brother-in-law Bill the contract to erect the new one). When Effingham learns about the plan, he fights for the courthouse's restoration. He brings in expert Major Hickock to evaluate the condition of the building.

The mayor responds by calling a town meeting, hoping that no one will show up. But Effingham alerts residents about the meeting in his column, and many townsfolk attend. The mayor claims the town will get 1/3 of the cost paid for by the Works Progress Administration if a new courthouse is built, but nothing for repairs. When uncomfortable questions are still asked, the mayor hastily adjourns the meeting. Effingham checks out the claims, and finds out that none of what the mayor said is true. Silk, however, refuses to call a second meeting.

Despite the lack of support from the newspaper's staff, with the sole exception of Ella Sue Dozier, Effingham is undeterred. He talks to the key townspeople, but they refuse to help him, and his spirit is finally broken.

Cousin Albert, who has enlisted in the National Guard (in an effort to impress Ella Sue), realizes that Effingham is right. When the local Guard unit is called up by the federal government, the mayor starts to make an empty speech, but the crowd is hostile. Albert lashes out, demanding that the courthouse be repaired and the square left alone. With the townsfolk solidly behind him, he forces the mayor to give in to his demands, and Effingham's old friends admit he was right after all.

== Cast ==
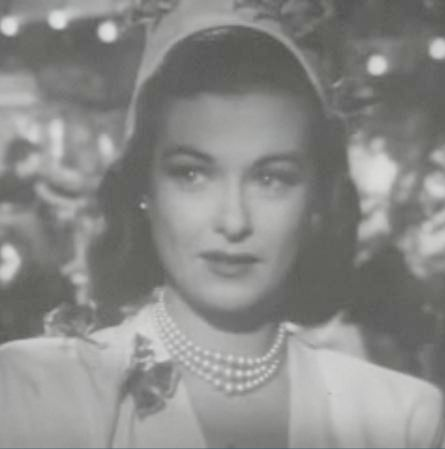
Joan Bennett as Ella Sue Dozier

- Charles Coburn as Col. Will Seaborn Effingham
- Joan Bennett as Ella Sue Dozier
- William Eythe as Albert 'Al' Marbury
- Allyn Joslyn as Earl Hoats
- Elizabeth Patterson as Cousin Emma
- Donald Meek as Doc Buden
- Frank Craven as Dewey
- Thurston Hall as Ed, the Mayor
- Cora Witherspoon as Mrs. Clara Meigs
- Emory Parnell as Joe Alsobrook
- Henry Armetta as Jimmy Economy
- Stephen Dunne as Prof. Edward 'Ed' Bland
- Roy Roberts as Army Capt. Rampey
