= Thomas Schumacher (pianist) =

Thomas Schumacher (December 8, 1935 — May 31, 2024) was an American classical pianist and music educator.

== Life and career ==
Born in Butte, Montana, Schumacher's early studies were with Fisher Thompson, with whom he worked for 15 years. Thompson was a former Vaudeville conductor and church musician who also wrote several 1920s song hits, "Rio Nights" and "You, Just You." Schumacher later credited Thompson for providing him with a "sense of curiosity" and an "analytic mind."

After graduating from high school, Schumacher studied with Robert Goldsand at the Manhattan School of Music and with Beveridge Webster and Adele Marcus at Juilliard. He gave his NYC debut recital at Town Hall in April 1963, playing Schubert, Prokofiev, and Chopin. The New York Herald Tribune was quoted as writing afterwards, "A superb young pianist made his New York solo debut yesterday evening at Town Hall. Thomas Schumacher was electrifying in every respect. With the power of a Gilels and the analytical intelligence of a Horowitz, he strode almost flawlessly through a finger-breaking program consisting of Schubert's G Major Fantasy, Op. 78, Prokofieff's Sonata No. 6, Op. 82, and Chopin's B Minor Sonata, Op. 58. The Prokofieff was a powerhouse of sound and technical vigor, brilliantly interpreted and quite awe-inspiring. There was charm, too, in the idiomatic Schubert and lyrical grandeur in the Chopin. If Mr. Schumacher has any fault worth noting, it is that he comes close to overwhelming the music by the force of his technique and the wealth of his interpretative ideas."

In 1962, Schumacher participated in the Ferruccio Busoni International Piano Competition. The American composer David Diamond was one of the judges, and asked Schumacher if he would premiere his Piano Concerto. Schumacher eventually premiered the work with the New York Philharmonic conducted by Leonard Bernstein on April 28, 1966.

Schumacher's only commercial recording, featuring the Scriabin 5th and 9th Piano Sonatas and Prokofiev 6th and 9th Sonatas, was released on Elan Recordings in 1994. In 2005, with the help of two assistants, Schumacher published an edition of Isaac Albeniz's Iberia suite for Zen-On Music in Japan.

Schumacher taught at the University of Maryland from 1969 until 1995, and then at the Eastman School of Music from 1995 until his retirement in 2008.

He passed away in La Jolla, San Diego, California, at the age of 88.
