= Robert Goldsand =

Austrian-American classical pianist

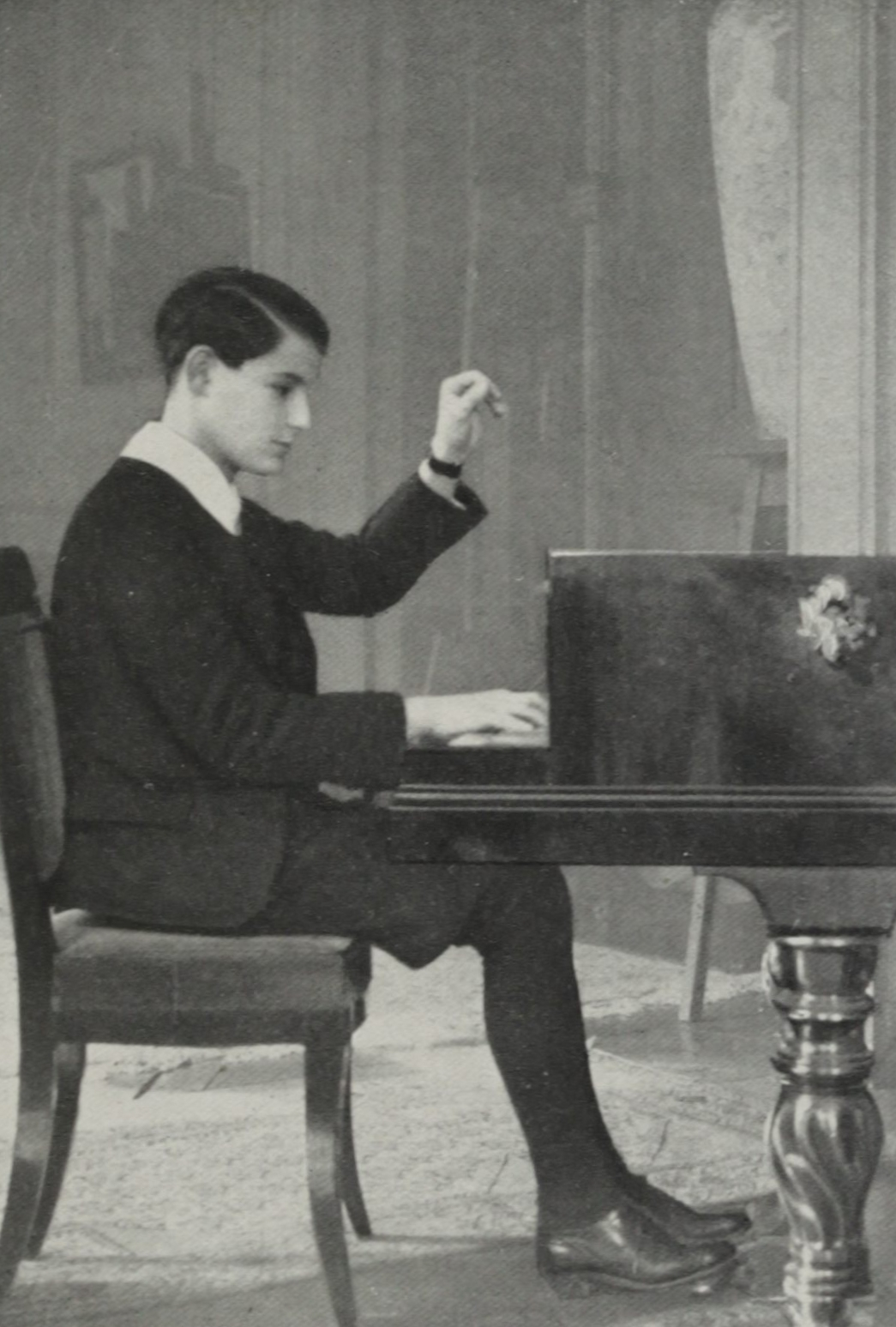
Robert Goldsand (1926)

Robert Goldsand (March 17, 1911 – September 16, 1991) was an Austrian-American classical pianist.

== Life ==
Goldsand was born in Vienna, Austria-Hungary, in 1911, the son of artisan Jakob Goldsand and his wife Helene. He began musical studies at age four on the violin, but discovery of his talent for the piano, and consequent concentration on that instrument, began within a year. A student of Camella Horn, Joseph Marx, Emil von Sauer, and Moriz Rosenthal, Goldsand launched his performing career at age 10, in November 1921, with a concert in Vienna. Thereafter, he engaged in European and South American tours. His US debut came in 1927 at Town Hall in New York City.

The pianist and critic Samuel Chotzinoff was present at Goldsand's debut recital, and wrote the following for the New York World:

A slight youth, nervous and ill at ease, walked hurriedly across the stage, sat down at the piano and without any preliminaries flung himself upon the two books of variations Brahms wrote around the theme of one of Paganini's caprices. Before Master Robert had raced through the first batch of the finger-breaking variations I felt that I was listening to one of the rarest of birds—an authentic pianistic prodigy. In these great days everybody has so much technique that one hardly ever mentions digital facility. But this Viennese phenomenon has acquired, or more probably was born with, more technique than ought properly to fall to the share of one person. Everything contained in the best equipped pianistic bag of tricks extant is Mr. Goldsand's inheritance. Along with these the lad has most of the musical refinements—a good tone, an uncanny pianissimo, sonority when needed and passion, loads of it. He can turn a phrase charmingly and invoke thunder when he finds it necessary to ease his young soul of Byronic emotions.

Goldsand returned to Europe to study in the 1930s, but escaped to the United States when the war broke out in 1939. After two successful performances at Town Hall, Goldsand received the Town Hall Award in 1941; the award committee consisted of music critics who submitted their choice for most successful Town Hall recitals in the previous year. In 1943, he played a complete Beethoven piano sonata series at Carnegie Hall.

In 1944, he took a teaching position at the Cincinnati Conservatory, filling a position vacated by Severin Eisenberger. In 1949, at the invitation of the Kosciuszko Foundation's Chopin Centennial Committee, he performed a complete cycle of that composer's recital repertoire in six concerts. Several years later, Goldsand joined the faculty at the Manhattan School of Music, where he taught from 1951 to teach until 1990.

Goldsand's concert repertoire was vast and included music ranging from the Baroque period with J.S. Bach's Goldberg Variations through works of major 19th-century composers such as Beethoven, Liszt, Chopin, Schumann, and Schubert. He also performed music of virtuoso performer-composers like Godowsky and Schulz-Evler; and such 20th-century composers as Hindemith.

== Pedagogy ==
Goldsand taught many students during his long tenure at the Manhattan School including Suezenne Fordham , Harris Goldsmith , Donald Isler, Anne Koscielny , Thomas Schumacher , Ralph Votapek , and Neil Galanter. According to Henry Edmundson, a student for one year not long before Goldsand's death, Goldsand was "a stickler for tradition" and demanded that the student adhere to Goldsand's way of playing a piece. Harris Goldsmith recalls Goldsand as a "pianistic charmer" with "debonair technical ease," citing an instance when Goldsand demonstrated with his left hand how to obtain the desired legato in the coda of Chopin's fourth ballade.

== Recordings ==
Most of Goldsand's recordings appeared on the American Concert Hall Society label. Later, Goldsand recorded for the American Desto and Decca labels. Very few of these LP issues have reappeared on compact disc, although in recent years there have been some recordings which have been uploaded to YouTube. A three-compact-disc-set of live recordings from Goldsand's own collection and a selection of studio recordings was released by Marston Records in 2023.

== Death ==
He died of diabetes in a Danbury, Connecticut nursing home, in 1991.

== Sources ==
- Album notes to Franz Schubert: Sonata in A Major, opus 120; Moments Musicaux, Concert Hall Society CHS 1148, 12" mono LP
- Biographical sketch at International Piano Archives at Maryland. Retrieved 26 Jul 2013.
- Dubal, David, program notes for Nimbus Records, The New Golden Era—Vladimir Horowitz, Shura Cherkassky, Abram Chasins, Robert Goldsand
- Ivry, Benjamin, A Music Critic Performs, Practices What He Preaches, published in The New York Observer on September 10, 2006
- Koscielny, Anne, recitalist biography for Matthay Festival 2002 at Columbus State University, Columbus, Georgia
- Manhattan School of Music chronology
- "Robert Goldsand, 80, Pianist and Teacher". The New York Times. September 17, 1991.
- Schumacher, Thomas, faculty biography at Eastman School of Music
- Votapek, Ralph, artist biography for Ivory Classics CD-72007 Ralph Votapek: Fire and Passion
