= Opus (classical record magazine) =

- Editor: James R. Oestreich
- Categories: Discography; Music journalism Classical music Music criticism
- Frequency: Bimonthly
- Publisher: Warren Bertram Syer (1923–2007)
- Founded: 1984
- Final issue: 1988
- Country: United States
- Based in: Harrisburg, Pennsylvania
- Language: English
- ISSN: 8750-488X

Opus was an American magazine that featured critical reviews of classical music recordings. Based in Harrisburg, Pennsylvania, the magazine ran bimonthly from November/December 1984 to March/April 1988, publishing 21 issues. James R. Oestreich was its editor-in-chief. Historical Times, Inc., of Harrisburg was its owner. Warren Bertram Syer (1923–2007), who had published High Fidelity for 30 years, was then the president of Historical Times.

== History ==
Music critics depart from High Fidelity

In 1983, most of the senior music critics at High Fidelity and Musical America — including Harris Goldsmith (1935-2014), (Stanley) Dale Harris (1928–1996), Andrew Porter, Will Crutchfield, Paul Henry Lang, Allan Kozinn, Peter G. Davis (born 1936), Kenneth (A.) Furie (born 1949), David Peter Hamilton (born 1935), Robert P. Morgan (born 1934), and Conrad L. Osborne (born 1934) — resigned in protest over a reduction of autonomy for their music editor, James Oestreich, who had been informed by the parent that the classical music section was going to be reduced to eight pages by January 1984, and further reduced to one or two pages by December 1984. In 1983, the average issue devoted 18 pages to classical music.

On behalf of the parent company, ABC Leisure Magazines of ABC Publishing, William (Bill) Tynan explained that they were going to "blend lengthy classical features into its highly acclaimed Musical America," a slim magazine sewn into the centerfold of selected issues of High Fidelity and available only by subscription. Musical America, at the time, had a circulation of about 20,000 subscribers. High Fidelity had a circulation of nearly 400,000. Tynan said that High Fidelity's average reader "no longer prefers the lengthy classical music articles that have appeared as part of the previous format."

Founding of Opus

A year later (1984), many of those critics became the core review staff for a start-up classical record magazine Opus, with Jim Oestreich as editor. Historical Times, Inc., of Harrisburg, Pennsylvania, was the parent.

Success of Opus

During the planning stage, Warren Bertram Syer, its publisher, designed a five-year business strategy, projecting non-profitability in years one through three, breakeven in year four, and profit in year five. It turned out that Opus became profitable in its fourth year.

Opus is acquired by Cowles Media

In December 1987, Historical Times – the company that published Opus – was acquired by larger firm, Cowles Media Company.

Cowles Media sells Opus to ABC Publishing — critical staff resigns, again

Despite being marginally profitable, Cowles regarded Opus as too marginal to maintain. James Gordon Keough (born 1946), who was appointed president of Cowles Media in 1987, made the decision to put Opus up for sale. He said that, while Opus was probably the best-written of the company's magazines, it "didn't fit strategically with the rest of our publications." Historical Times had been printing mostly history and outdoor magazines. In December 1987, Opus had a circulation of 25,000, one-fourth of corporation's next smallest magazine, British Heritage.

In June 1988, Cowles Media sold Opus to Capital Cities/ABC — which was still the parent of High Fidelity as well as Musical America. The critics and editors of Opus, including James Oestreich, all of whom had broken away from High Fidelity in 1983, resigned again.

Cessation as a free-standing publication

The 21st issue (March/April 1988) was the final free-standing publication of Opus. Following the acquisition, Opus was absorbed by Musical America, debuting in its July 1988 issue. Theodore (Ted) W. Libbey, Jr. (born 1951), then the classical music editor of High Fidelity, became senior editor of the new Opus section. Patricia Reilly, who formerly edited Musical America's Recordings in Review, became the associate editor of the new Opus section. Shirley Fleming (1929–2005) continued as editor-in-chief of Musical America.

The words "incorporating Opus" added to Musical America's masthead was, according to Allan Kozinn, somewhat misleading, given the resignation of its core staff and editors.

== Purpose: classical music advocacy ==
Because Opus was founded by classical music journalists, it was a cause as much as it was a magazine. Besides shorter reviews, Richard Taruskin freely wrote as many as 60 pages on Beethoven symphony recordings, and Allan Kozinn wrote 82 pages on the state of the classical record business. Will Crutchfield and Conrad Osborne published a running debate about vocal style.
