= Peter G. Davis =

American classical music critic (1936–2021)

Peter Graffam Davis (March 3, 1936 – February 13, 2021) was an American opera and classical music critic. He was the classical music critic for the magazine New York from 1980 until 2007. He also wrote for The New York Times, Musical America, and Opera News among other publications. He previously worked for The New York Times and authored the book, The American Opera Singer.

== Early life ==
Davis was born in Concord, Massachusetts, on March 3, 1936. His father, E. Russell Davis, worked as a vice president for the Bank of Boston; his mother, Susan (Graffam) Davis, was a housewife. Davis was raised in nearby Lincoln. He developed a keen interest in opera during his teenage years, compiling a record collection and attending concerts held in Boston.

Davis studied music at Harvard College, graduating with a bachelor's degree in 1958. Several months before his third year, he did a tour of the summer music festivals in Europe. He subsequently spent one year at the Stuttgart Hochschule für Musik, before undertaking postgraduate studies at Columbia University. There, he studied under Jack Beeson and Otto Luening, and earned a master's degree in composition in 1962. By 1967, Davis was the music editor of High Fidelity and Musical America as well as the New York music correspondent for The Times of London.

== Career ==
Davis first worked as a music critic for The New York Times in 1967. He started off authoring freelance articles, before becoming the paper's Sunday music editor seven years later. This enabled him to commission other writers for articles, in addition to his everyday reviews of recordings, concerts, and first recitals. He subsequently became critic for New York magazine in 1981. He critiqued all genres of classical music; his specialty and passion lay with opera and vocal music. He was also noted for writing disapprovingly of up-and-coming music and composers who he believed were overrated, such as Philip Glass and Beverly Sills. Davis published the book The American Opera Singer in 1997. It chronicled modern American performers, applauding their versatility while criticizing many for being "superficial workhorses".

After over a quarter of a century with New York, Davis was requested to sign an "agreement of separation" in June 2007. The magazine decided to abolish the full-time position of classical music critic. Davis stated that this was "euphemistic for being fired", and lamented how "classical music is of less and less interest to [the editorial leadership]". Consequently, he returned to The New York Times as a freelancer and was a regular contributor to Opera News and Musical America.

== Later life ==
Davis married Scott Parris in 2009. They remained married until the former's death. Davis suffered a stroke in 2018. He died on February 13, 2021, at Mount Sinai West in New York City. He was 84, and suffered a brief illness prior to his death.
