= Donald Isler =

American classical pianist and music educator

- Born: January 14, 1952 (age 74); Paterson, New Jersey, USA
- Origin: Westchester County, New York
- Education: Manhattan School of Music
- Genres: Classical
- Occupations: Musician, teacher
- Instrument: Piano
- Years active: 1980–present
- Label: KASP

Donald Isler (born January 14, 1952, in Paterson, New Jersey) is an American classical pianist and music educator based in Westchester County near New York.

== Biography ==
Donald Isler grew up in New York in a music-loving family. Both his father Werner and his mother Charlotte, née Nussbaum, were good amateur pianists. His maternal grandfather was the conductor Manfred Nussbaum from Hammelburg in Germany, who in 1939 fled to the US, and after whom the Manfred Nussbaum Memorial Music Award at Fiorello H. LaGuardia High School is named.

== Education ==
Donald Isler began piano lessons at the age of eight with Sina Berlinski. His other teachers included chamber musicians Artur Balsam and Eleanor Hancock, and solo pianists Bruce Hungerford, Constance Keene, Robert Goldsand, Lilian Kallir, and Zenon Fishbein.

Isler holds Bachelor's and Master's degrees from Manhattan School of Music with a major in piano. He has attended pedagogy courses at the Diller-Quaile School of Music in New York and the Summer Seminar in Piano Technique at the Taubman Institute in Amherst, Massachusetts, among others.

== Teaching ==
Isler has taught at several music schools including Brooklyn College Preparatory Center, Diller-Quaile School of Music in New York, and Bennett Conservatory of Music in Westchester County. In addition to his work with his private students, he teaches at the Hackley School Music Institute in Tarrytown and is a faculty member of the Summit Music Festival and Institute in Purchase, New York.

He is a board member of the Associated Music Teachers League.

== Career ==
Donald Isler made his debut in Carnegie Recital Hall (now Joan and Sanford L. Weill Recital Hall) in 1980 performing Handel's Chaconne in G major, Mozart's Piano Sonata No. 10 in C major, Beethoven's Bagatelles Op. 126, Bártok's Romanian Folk Dances for piano, and Chopin's Piano Sonata No. 3 in B minor, Op. 58. He has gone on to perform at Alice Tully Hall at Lincoln Center in New York, at the Dame Myra Hess Memorial Concert Series in Chicago, and many other concert halls in the United States, as well as in England. His concert appearances have been well received by critics, such as the April 22, 1986, concert of Schnabel's works and piano sonatas by Franz Schubert and Ludwig van Beethoven at Symphony Space in New York, performed as a tribute to Artur Schnabel.

His CDs have been featured several times on the prestigious radio program "Reflections from the Keyboard" of NYPR's classical music station WQXR-FM, as well as on "The Piano Matters" of WWFM – The Classical Network. In 2017, he appeared on another WWFM program, "Between the Keys", where he was interviewed about his teacher, Bruce Hungerford, who died in a car accident. He has lectured on the music of Artur Schnabel at the International Keyboard Institute and Festival and at Mannes College of Music, wrote the foreword for a new edition of Schnabel's Dance Suite for Piano, and was interviewed about it on the blog "New York Pianist".

Isler is the founder of the KASP Records label, which has produced fourteen CDs (as of 2021). Among them are his recordings of Ludwig van Beethoven, Franz Schubert, Robert Schumann, and Johannes Brahms, as well as lesser known but significant works by Louis Spohr (1784–1859) and Artur Schnabel (1882–1951), such as the premiere recordings of Spohr's Piano Sonata in A-flat major Op. 125 and Schnabel's Dance Suite for Piano, as well as Schnabel's Seven Piano Pieces from 1947. Another CD with Donald Isler contains a recording of the important piano works of the American composer Louis Pelosi: 37 Canons, Inventions and Fugues. A DVD released by KASP contains the only known videotaped performance by Bruce Hungerford (with Beethoven's Piano Concerto No. 4).

Isler writes concert reviews regularly, primarily in the "Classical Music Guide" and "New York Concert Review. He also writes a blog on Facebook entitled "Isler's Insights" which features articles on music and musicians, the piano, and teaching.

== Recordings ==
- Louis Pelosi: Inventions, Canons and Fugues: Thirty-Seven Variations on a Single Motif; KASP 2004–2008
- Schubert: Piano Sonata in E major D 568; Schumann: Waldszenen Op. 82; Brahms: Ballade in D minor Op. 10 No. 1 ("Edward"), Intermezzo in E major Op. 116 No. 6, Four Piano Pieces Op. 119; KASP 2004
- Beethoven: Six Bagatelles for piano Op. 126, Piano Sonata No. 31 in A major Op. 110, Piano Sonata No. 32 in C minor Op. 111; KASP 2001
- Spohr: Piano Sonata in A-flat major Op. 125 (premiere recording), Rondoletto in G major Op. 149; Schubert: Piano Sonata in D major D 850; KASP 1998
- Beethoven: Piano Sonata No. 5 in C minor Op. 10 No. 1, Piano Sonata No. 30 in E major Op. 109; Schnabel: Seven Piano Pieces (1947), Dance Suite for Piano (1920–1921) (premiere recording); KASP 1997

== Publications ==
- Afterthoughts of a Pianist/Teacher. A Collection of Essays and Interviews, iUniverse, 2022, ISBN 978-1-66323-430-8
