= List of compositions by Lukas Foss =

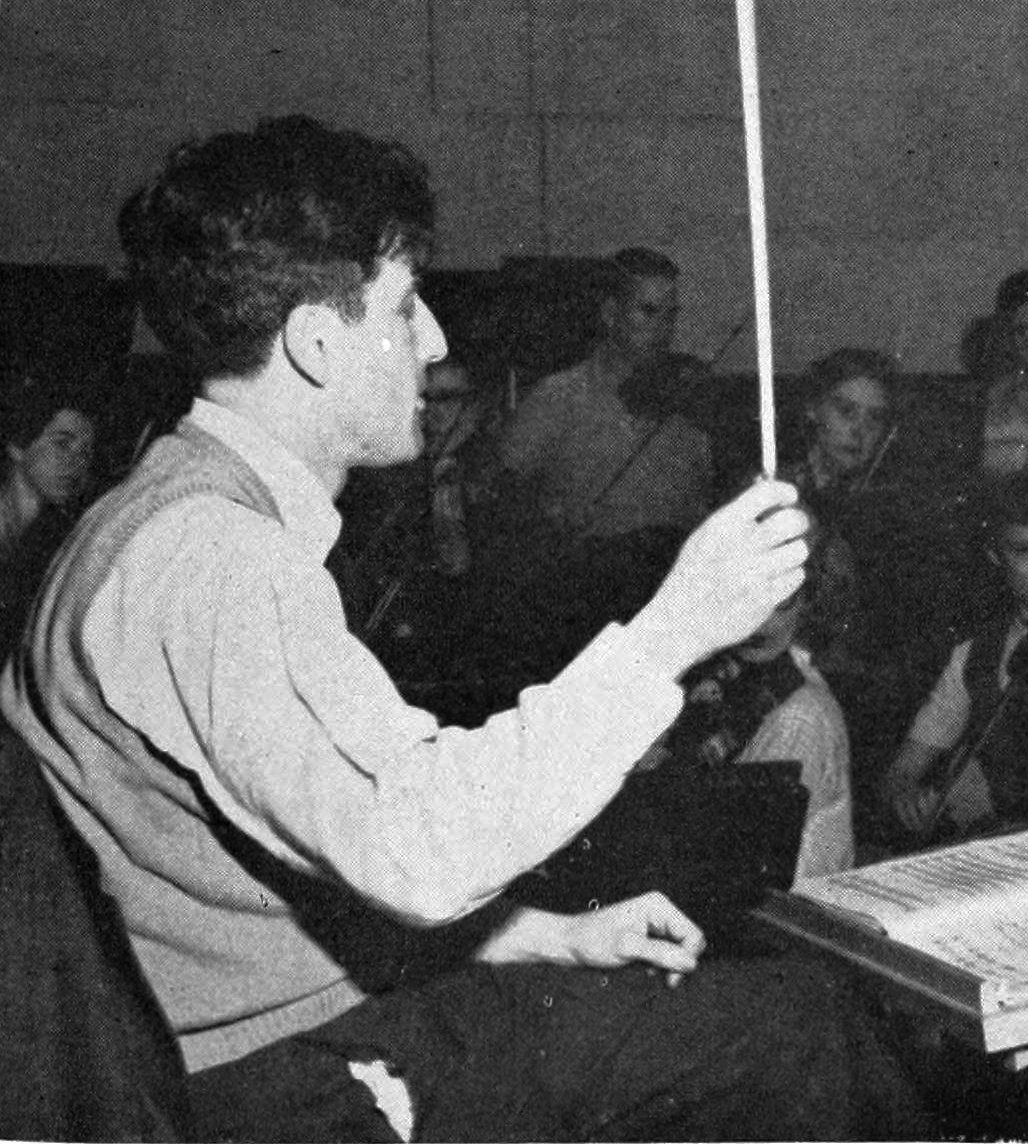
Foss in 1960

The early works of Lukas Foss are neoclassical in style, using controlled improvisation and chance procedures with the twelve-tone technique and serialism, while his later works are polystylistic.

== Stage ==
- The Tempest (1939–1940); incidental music to the play by William Shakespeare
- The Heart Remembers, ballet for piano (1944)
- Within These Walls, ballet for piano (1944)
- Gift of the Magi, ballet (1944)
- Capriccio, ballet for cello and piano (1946)
- The Jumping Frog of Calaveras County, opera in two scenes (1949); libretto by Jean Karsavina, after the short story by Mark Twain; premiere May 18, 1950, Indiana University
- Griffelkin, opera in 3 acts (1953–1955); libretto by Alastair Reid after H. Foss; November 6, 1955, premiere on NBC television
- Introductions and Good-byes, a nine-minute opera (1959); libretto by Gian Carlo Menotti

== Orchestra ==
- Two Pieces (1941)
- The Prairie (1944); orchestral suite from the cantata
- Ode (1944, revised 1958)
- Symphony No. 1 in G major (1944)
- Pantomime (1945); concert suite from the ballet Gift of the Magi
- Recordare (1948)
- Parade (1955); from the opera Griffelkin
- Symphony No. 2 "Symphony of Chorales" (1955–1958)
- For 24 Winds (1966); 2 versions
- Baroque Variations (1967)
  1. On a Handel Larghetto
  2. On a Scarlatti Sonata
  3. On a Bach Prelude: Phorion (see also 2nd version from 1994 below)
- Geod for large orchestra in four groups with optional chorus (1969)
- Fanfare (1973)
- Salomon Rossi Suite (1974)
- Folksong (1975–1976, revised 1978)
- Quintets for orchestra (1979); composer's transcription of Brass Quintet (1978)
- Exeunt (1982)
- For 200 Cellos (A Celebration) (1982)
- Griffelkin (1986); concert suite from the opera
- March for small orchestra (1989); from the opera Griffelkin
- American Fanfare (1990); also version for amplified harp or electric guitar, double bass, amplified piano, synthesizer or electronic organ and symphonic band (1990)
- Symphony No. 3 "Symphony of Sorrows" for speaker ad libitum, obbligato piano and large orchestra (1989–1991)
- Phorion (1994); version of On a Bach Prelude from Baroque Variations (1967)
- Symphony No. 4 "Window to the Past" (1995)
- Symphonic Fantasy (2001)
- For Aaron for flute, oboe, clarinet, bassoon, horn, trumpet, trombone, percussion (optional), violin, viola, cello, double bass (2002), arrangement of Gift of the Magi (1944)

== Concert Band ==
- American Fanfare for amplified harp or electric guitar, double bass, amplified piano, synthesizer or electronic organ and symphonic band (1990); also version for orchestra
- Concerto for Band (2002)

== Concertante ==
- Concerto No. 1 for clarinet and orchestra (1941); version for piano and orchestra (1943)
- Three American Pieces for flute or violin and small orchestra (1944); also for violin and piano
- Concerto for oboe and orchestra (1947–1948)
- Elegy for clarinet and orchestra (1949)
- Concerto No. 2 for piano and orchestra (1949–1951, revised 1953); modeled after Beethoven's Emperor Concerto
- Cello Concert for solo cello and orchestra (1966)
- Concerto for solo percussion and large or small orchestra (1974)
- Orpheus for cello or viola or violin and chamber orchestra (1972); also version titled Orpheus and Euridice (1983)
- Night Music for John Lennon (Prelude, Fugue and Chorale) for brass quintet and orchestra (1980–1981)
- Orpheus and Euridice for 2 violins, chamber orchestra and tape (1983); 2nd version of Orpheus (1972)
- Renaissance Concerto for flute and orchestra (1985)
- Concerto No. 2 for clarinet and small orchestra (1988); arrangement of chamber work, Tashi
- For Lenny, Variation on "New York, New York" for obbligato piano and orchestra (1988); also version for solo piano
- American Landscapes, concerto for guitar and small orchestra (1989)
- Elegy for Anne Frank for chamber orchestra and piano solo, speaker ad libitum (1989); portion from Symphony No. 3; composed to commemorate 60th birthday anniversary of Anne Frank
- Concerto for the Left Hand for piano left hand and orchestra (1993)
- For Tōru for flute and string orchestra or string quintet (1996)
- Capriccio for cello and small orchestra (1999)
- Celebration for brass quintet and orchestra (1999)
- Solo Transformed for piano and small orchestra (2000); original version for solo piano; also version titled Solo Observed for piano and small ensemble (1982)

== Chamber music ==
- Sonata for violin and piano (1937)
- Four Preludes for flute, clarinet and bassoon (1940)
- Intermezzo for cello and piano (1940); composer's transcription from the incidental music The Tempest
- Duo (Fantasia) for cello and piano (1941)
- Three Pieces for violin and piano (1944); orchestrated as Three American Pieces; also version titled Three Early Pieces for flute and piano (1986)
  1. Early Song
  2. Dedication
  3. Composer's Holiday
- String Quartet No. 1 in G major (1947)
- Capriccio for cello and piano (1948)
- Studies in Improvisation for clarinet, horn, cello, piano and percussion (1959)
- Echoi for clarinet, cello, percussion and piano (1961–1963)
- Elytres for flute, 2 violins and chamber ensemble (1964)
- Non-Improvisation for clarinet, cello, piano or harpsichord, electronic organ, percussion ad libitum (1967)
- Paradigm for percussionist-conductor, electric guitar or electric sitar and three other instruments capable of sustaining a sound (1968, revised 1969)
- MAP (Musicians at Play), musical game for 4 virtuoso performers and electronic tapes (1970)
- Ni bruit ni vitesse for 2 pianos and 2 percussionist (to play on the piano strings) (1971)
- La Grotte des Vents (The Cave of the Winds) for wind quintet (1972)
- String Quartet No. 2 "Divertissement pour Mica" (1973)
- String Quartet No. 3 (1975)
- Curriculum Vitae for accordion (1977); also version titled Curriculum Vitae with Time-Bomb (1980)
- Music for Six for any 6 treble-clef instruments (1977, revised 1978)
- Brass Quintet (1978); composer's orchestral transcription Quintets (1979)
- Round a Common Centre for 1 or 2 violins, viola, cello, piano, mezzo-soprano ad libitum, speaker ad libitum (1979); commissioned for the 1980 Olympic Games
- Curriculum Vitae with Time-Bomb for percussion solo and taped or live accordion (1980); 2nd version of Curriculum Vitae for accordion (1977)
- Solo Observed for piano and small ensemble (vibraphone or marimba, cello or harp, electronic organ or accordion) (1982); original version for solo piano; also version titled Solo Transformed (2000)
- Percussion Quartet (1983)
- Trio for horn, violin and piano (1983)
- Saxophone Quartet (1985)
- Tashi for clarinet, piano and string quartet (1986)
- Chaconne for guitar (1987)
- Central Park Reel for violin and piano (1989)
- For Toru for flute and string quintet (1996) (version of orchestral work)
- String Quartet No. 4 (1998); commissioned by the Buffalo Chamber Music Society for their 75th season
- String Quartet No. 5 (2000)
- Anniversary Fanfare for Aaron Copland for 3 trumpets, 2 horns, 2 trombones, tuba and 2 percussionists (2000)
- Today for 2 or more performers

== Organ ==
- Four Études (1967)
- War and Peace (1995)

== Piano ==
Foss's solo piano music forms a relatively small part of his compositional output. Still, it demonstrates, as a whole, his lighter, neoclassical stylistic practice and associated techniques. This repertoire spans a 50-year period from 1938 to 1988 and includes:

- Four Two-Part Inventions (1938)
- Grotesque Dance (1938)
- Sonatina (1939)
- Set of Three Pieces for 2 pianos (1940)
- Passacaglia (1941)
- Fantasy Rondo (1944)
- Prelude in D (1949)
- Scherzo Ricercato (1953)
- Solo (1981); also versions titled Solo Observed and Solo Transformed
- For Lenny (1988), variation for solo piano on Bernstein's song "New York, New York"; also version for obbligato piano and orchestra

The piece that stands apart from this largely neoclassical repertoire is Solo (1981), a hybrid minimalist and twelve-tone work employing as a guiding technical principle the gradual transformation of several pitch collections. At the conclusion of Solo, these pitch collections change from serial to tonal, effecting a remarkable surprise. Of For Lenny, the opera composer Daniel Felsenfeld has written that Foss "is loving and careful with his treatment, avoiding vulgarity or navel gazing and offering instead a calm (yet not un-bouncy) treatment of this famous tune".

The world-premiere recording of Foss's complete extant piano works was released in 2002 by the Sonatabop.com recording label based in Milwaukee. This recording was completed in honor of Foss's 80th birthday; the project was conceived by pianist Daniel Beliavsky (b. 1978), who in collaboration with producers Donald Sipe (the owner and head of Sonatabop.com as well as Omicronarts.com) and Yuri Beliavsky recorded the repertoire in the summer of 2002. Naxos's release of Foss's complete piano works dates from early 2005, over two years after Sonatabop's recording. Despite this chronology, Naxos inserted a false claim into the CD materials that its release is the first. Several reviews make note of this discrepancy, including one by John France on the British music site MusicWeb-International, and one by Peter Grahame Woolf on another British site, Musical Pointers.

== Choral ==
- The Prairie, cantata for soprano, alto, tenor, bass, mixed chorus and orchestra (1943); text by Carl Sandburg
- Tell This Blood for mixed chorus (1945); text by Aaron Kramer
- Adon Olom (The Lord of All), psalm for mixed chorus, cantor and organ (1948)
- Behold, I Build an House, cantata for chorus and organ (1950); Biblical text
- A Parable of Death for tenor, narrator, chorus and orchestra (1952); text by Rainer Maria Rilke
- Psalms for mixed chorus and small orchestra (or 2 pianos) (1955–1956)
- The Fragments of Archilochos for countertenor, male and female speakers, 4 small choirs, optional mixed chorus, guitar, mandolin and percussion (1965); text by Archilochus
- Three Airs for Frank O'Hara's Angel for soprano, male speaker, female chorus, flute, piano and percussion (1972); text by Frank O'Hara, V. R. Lang
- Lamdeni (Teach Me) for mixed chorus and plucked and beaten sounds (1973); text from Hebrew sources
- American Cantata for soprano, tenor, female speaker, male speaker, double chorus, orchestra (1976, revised 1977); texts by the composer and Arieh Sachs
- "Then the Rocks on the Mountain Began to Shout," Charles Ives for 5 mixed voices or a cappella chorus (1977–1978); text by Walt Whitman
- With Music Strong for mixed chorus and orchestra (1979); text by Walt Whitman
- De Profundis for mixed chorus (1983)
- Sanctus for mixed chorus and orchestra (1994)

== Vocal ==
- Wanderers Gemütsruhe (Song for a Wanderer) for soprano (or tenor) and piano (1938, revised 1948); text by Johann Wolfgang von Goethe
- Where the Bee Sucks for medium voice and piano (1940); Ariel's song from the incidental music The Tempest; text by William Shakespeare
- Melodrama and Dramatic Song for Michelangelo for voice and orchestra (1940)
- Tanglewood Song for voice (unison voices) with accompaniment of 3 trumpets, 3 trombones, and bass tuba
- Song of Anguish, cantata for baritone or bass and large orchestra (1945); Biblical text
- Song of Songs, cantata for soprano or mezzo-soprano and orchestra (1946); Biblical text
- For Cornelia, song for voice and piano (1955); text by William Butler Yeats
- Time Cycle, 4 songs for soprano and orchestra (1959–1960); version for soprano, clarinet, cello, celesta, percussion (1960); texts by W. H. Auden, A. E. Housman, Franz Kafka, Friedrich Nietzsche
- Thirteen Ways of Looking at a Blackbird for voice, flute, piano, percussion and tape (1978); text by Wallace Stevens
- Measure for Measure for tenor and small orchestra (1980); text by William Shakespeare
