= Shirley Fleming =

American journalist

- Born: 1929; New York City
- Died: March 10, 2005 (aged 75)
- Education: Smith College (B.A., M.A.)
- Occupations: Music critic, editor
- Father: Berry Fleming

Shirley Fleming (1929 in New York City – 10 March 2005) was an American music critic and editor.

== Biography ==
Born in New York City in 1929, she was the daughter of novelist Berry Fleming, who enjoyed popularity during the 1930s and 1940s with a series of successful works, and later in the 1980s with his Captain Bennett's Folly. Shirley grew up in Augusta, Georgia, and maintained a home there throughout her life. She earned both bachelor's and master's degrees from Smith College and was a classically trained violist. From 1967 to 1991, she was the editor of the magazine Musical America. She also served as editor for the publications High Fidelity, Hi-Fi Music at Home, and the American Record Guide. In 1965 she worked as a freelance writer for The New York Times and later was on that paper's music criticism staff from 1975 to 1978.

From 1978 until her death of a stroke on 10 March 2005 she wrote music criticism for the New York Post.
