= High Fidelity (magazine) =

1951-1989 American magazine

- Categories: Audio
- Frequency: Monthly
- Circulation: 327,000 at closure in 1989
- Founder: Milton B. Sleeper
- Founded: 1951
- First issue: April 1951
- Final issue: July 1989
- Company: Audiocom, Inc. (1951–1957); Billboard Publications, Inc. (1957–1974); ABC Consumer Magazines (1974–1989)
- Country: United States
- Based in: Great Barrington, Massachusetts
- Language: English
- ISSN: 0018-1455

High Fidelity — often abbreviated HiFi — was an American magazine that was published from April 1951 until July 1989 and was a source of information about high fidelity audio equipment, video equipment, audio recordings, and other aspects of the musical world, such as music history, biographies, and anecdotal stories by or about noted performers.

Great Barrington, Massachusetts-based High Fidelity magazine was originally founded as a quarterly publication in 1951 by audiophile Milton B. Sleeper. One of the first editors was Charles Fowler. Later, the publication became a monthly and Fowler became the publisher.

In 1957, High Fidelity and its sister publication Audiocraft were acquired by Billboard Publications, Inc., when it purchased High Fidelity's parent company, Audiocom, Inc. from Audiocom's president and publisher Charles Fowler.

After 16 years of ownership, Billboard sold High Fidelity in 1974, along with its sister publication Modern Photography, to the magazine division of the American Broadcasting Companies for $9 million. At the time of the sale, High Fidelity and Modern Photography had circulations of 260,000 and 470,000 respectively.

Until 1981, its editorial offices were located in Great Barrington, Massachusetts. In January of that year, its parent company, ABC Consumer Magazines, began moving the publication's operations to New York City, a process that was completed in about a year. In 1989, ABC sold High Fidelity and its sister publication Modern Photography to Diamandis Communications (now Hachette Filipacchi Media), which merged its subscriber list with that of Stereo Review magazine. (Stereo Review transformed into the present Sound and Vision magazine in 2000.) High Fidelity and Modern Photography had circulations of 327,000 and 689,000 respectively by the time these magazines were shut down by Diamandis.

== Musical America ==
During the period in which it was a subsidiary of Billboard Publications, High Fidelity purchased Musical America in 1964 and incorporated the newly acquired publication as an additional insert to selected editions of High Fidelity that were mailed to subscribers who had paid an additional fee. During this time, the Musical America was not available in the copies of High Fidelity that were sold at newsstands, but only in certain copies available only by subscription. This business arrangement continued after High Fidelity was sold to ABC Consumer Magazines in 1974.

ABC continued this publishing arrangement until 1986 when ABC decided it needed to revive Musical America as a separate monthly publication (which later became bimonthly) to fight back against the loss of readership caused by the foundation of a new competing classic music publication by James R. Oestreich called Opus. Oestreich was a former High Fidelity classic music editor who was fired in 1983 for protesting the cutbacks in classic music coverage in the joint High Fidelity/Musical America publication. In protest to Oestreich dismissal, several noted classic music editors resigned in mass to eventually join Oestreich at his new publication.

The reintroduction of the first separate issue of Musical America in 1987 was mishandled by ABC since ABC did not provide copies for distribution at newsstands in many major cities. Although Musical America's tenure at ABC was not very impressive, it avoided High Fidelity's fate of being sold to Diamandis and remained with ABC until 1991 when it was sold to media investor Gerry M. Ritterman.

== See also ==
- Audio (magazine)
