= Musical America =

Classical music magazine

- Categories: music magazine
- Frequency: Annual (directory)
- Founder: John Christian Freund
- First issue: October 8, 1898 (magazine); 1960 (directory)
- Final issue: January–February 1992 (magazine)
- Company: Performing Arts Resources LLC
- Country: United States
- Language: English
- Website: musicalamerica.com
- ISSN: 0735-7788

Musical America is the oldest American magazine on classical music, first appearing in 1898 in print and in 1999 online, at musicalamerica.com. It is published by Performing Arts Resources, LLC, of East Windsor, New Jersey.

== History ==
=== 1898–1964 ===
Musical America's first issue was on October 8, 1898. Its founder was John Christian Freund (1848–1924), who with Milton Weil, also founded The Music Trades magazine in 1893. Thirty-six issues appeared until June 24, 1899, covering music, drama, and the arts. In 1899 the publication was discontinued for six years due to a lack of financial resources. It reappeared as a weekly from November 18, 1905, until 1929, solely focusing on classical music. In 1921 Musical America published the first "Guide," which later evolved into the International Directory of the Performing Arts, now the Musical America Directory.

After John Freund died in 1924, Milton Weil who had been Freund's business partner continued the publication. In June 1927, Musical America consolidated with five other prominent trade publications to form a new company named Trade Publications, Inc., headed by Walter Howey and Verne Hardin Porter (1888–1942). Included were its sister publication, The Music Trades, and The American Architect, The Barbers' Journal, Beauty Culture, and Perfumers' Journal. Shields & Company was the investment banking firm that handled the consolidation. Musical America subsequently began diversifying with articles about jazz, dance, radio, and records.

Trade Publications, Inc., filed for bankruptcy in 1929; and, in a bankruptcy sale on July 19, 1929, John Majeski, Weil's former assistant, purchased four of the six magazines for $45,200: (i) Musical America, (ii) The Music Trades, (iii) The Barbers' Journal, and (iv) Beauty Culture.

After some 30 years of relative stability, effective January 1, 1960, John Majeski retired and sold Musical America and The Music Trades to Music Publications, Ltd., a newly formed corporation headed by two editors from Musical America, Theodate Johnson (1907–2002) and Ronald Eyer. Johnson, sister of the architect, Philip Johnson, continued as director of artists relations and Eyer continued as editor-in-chief.

=== 1964–1992 ===
In 1964, Music Publications, Ltd. sold the magazine and the annual directory to High Fidelity magazine, a subsidiary of Billboard Publications, the owners of Billboard magazine. High Fidelity incorporated the newly acquired publication as an additional insert inside certain editions of High Fidelity that were mailed to subscribers who had paid an additional fee. During this time, the Musical America was not available in the copies of High Fidelity that were sold at newsstands, but only in certain copies available only by subscription. This business arrangement continued after High Fidelity was sold to ABC Consumer Magazines in 1974.

ABC continued this publishing arrangement until 1986 when ABC decided it needed to revive Musical America as a separate monthly publication (which later became bimonthly) to fight back against the loss of readership caused by the founding of a new competing classic music publication by a James R. Oestreich called Opus. Oestreich was a former High Fidelity classic music editor who was fired in 1983 for protesting the cutbacks in classic music coverage in High Fidelity/Musical America. In protest to Oestreich dismissal, several noted classic music editors resigned in mass to eventually join Oestreich at his new publication.

The reintroduction of the first separate issue of Musical America in 1987 was mishandled by ABC since ABC did not provide copies for distribution at newsstands in many major cities. Although Musical America's tenure at ABC was not very impressive, it avoided High Fidelity's fate of being sold to Diamandis and remained with ABC until 1991 when it was sold to media investor Gerry M. Ritterman. During most of this time, Shirley Fleming served as the magazine's editor from 1967 to 1991.

Faced with declining sales and rising costs, Ritterman tried to turn the magazine around by firing the entire editorial staff and implementing cost saving measures, but was unsuccessful. A few months later, he announced that he was shutting down the magazine with the publication of the January/February 1992 issue being the last. However, Ritterman said he was going to continue to publish the lucrative Annual Directory, a separate publication that followed the magazine in its journey through several change of ownership.

=== 1992–2013 ===
Ritterman kept the Annual Directory for two more years before selling it, along with the entire directory division, in 1994 to K-III Communications (now Rent Group). Under Primedia, the Annual Directory announced in December 1998 the launch the following year of website MusicalAmerica.com. This publishes 25 news stories per week and since April 2004 has also been issuing a weekly newsletter.

Primedia sold Musical America as part of its directories division to Commonwealth Business Media, Inc. in October 2000. Commonwealth Business Media was itself acquired for $152 million in 2006 by United Business Media plc.

=== 2013 to present ===
Musical America has been owned and published by Performing Arts Resources, LLC, of New Jersey, since February 2013.

== Musical America's impact on American composers ==
Freund and Weil were exponents of American music and used Musical America to promote it. After Freund's death, Weil took over Musical America as editor. On December 11, 1925, Weil, on behalf of Musical America, announced a $3,000 prize for the best symphonic work, with a contest closing date, initially December 31, 1926, but extended to April 1, 1927. The contest was open to American citizens, native or naturalized. The contest elevated its winner, Ernest Bloch, a Swiss-born American, into the international spotlight and raised international acclaim for American music and its composers. Bloch's work, America, an Epic Rhapsody, was premiered simultaneously on December 20, 1928, in six American cities: San Francisco, Ann Arbor, Providence, New York, Cincinnati, and Los Angeles. Bloch's composition was selected among nine-two anonymous submissions. The judges were conductors of five major orchestras: Walter Damrosch of the New York Symphony, Serge Koussevitzky of the Boston Symphony, Leopold Stokowski of the Philadelphia Orchestra, Frederick Stock of the Chicago Symphony, and Alfred Hertz of the San Francisco Symphony. On July 29, 1929, seven months after the spectacular success of the premier, Musical America was sold in a bankruptcy sale to John Majeski.

== Editors ==
- 1898–1924: John Christian Freund (Milton Weil, asst editor)
- 1924–1927: Milton Weil
- 1927–1929: Deems Taylor

1929: Metronome Corporation acquired Musical America

- 1929–1936: A. Walter Kramer (1890–1969)
- 1936–1943: Oscar Thompson (1887–1945), executive editor
- 1943–1947: Ronald F. Eyer
- 1947: John F. Majeski, Jr.
- 1948–1952: Cecil Michener Smith (1906–1956)
- 1952–1960: Ronald F. Eyer

Music Publications, Ltd.

- 1960–1962: Robert Sabin (1912–1969)
- 1962–1963: Everett Helm
- 1963–1964: Jay S. Harrison

High Fidelity Magazine

- 1965–1967: Roland Gelatt

Under other publishers

- 1967–1991 Shirley Fleming

February 1991: Gerry M. Ritterman acquired Musical America from Capital Cities/ABC

- March 1991–January 1992: Charles I. Passy (born 1964)

1999: launch of MusicalAmerica.com

- 1999–2017: Susan Elliott

== Notable covers ==
- Alexander Kipnis — March 10, 1940

== See also ==
- Opus, classical record magazine

== Archives and access ==
Library of Congress Control Numbers

LCCN ca07-4415 (High Fidelity → Oct. 8, 1898: Vol. 1, no. 1 – Dec. 1964: Vol. 84, no. 10)
LCCN 2019-210558 (High Fidelity incorporating Musical America → Feb. 1965: Vol. 15, no. 2 – Dec. 1969: Vol. 19, no. 12)
LCCN sn78-6282 (Musical America and High Fidelity → Jan. 1970: Vol. 20, no. 1 – Jun. 1979: Vol. 29, no. 6)
LCCN sn87-17408 (Musical America and High Fidelity → Jan. 1970: Vol. 20, no. 1 – Jun. 1979: Vol. 29, no. 6)
LCCN sc83-7484 (High Fidelity & Musical America → Oct. 1979: Vol. 29, no. 9 – Jul. 1980: Vol. 30, no. 7)
LCCN 83-640343 (High Fidelity, Musical America edition → 1980–1986)
LCCN 87-640738 (Musical America → Mar. 1987: Vol. 107, no. 1 – Jan./Feb. 1992: Vol. 112, no. 1)
LCCN 2006-233161 (Musical America Worldwide → 2005–2012)

International Standard Serial Numbers

ISSN 0735-7788 (High Fidelity → Oct. 8, 1898: Vol. 1 – Dec. 1964: Vol. 84, no. 10)
ISSN 0735-9241 (High Fidelity incorporating Musical America → Feb. 1965: Vol. 15, no. 2 – Dec. 1969: Vol. 19, no. 12)
ISSN 0018-1463 (Musical America and High Fidelity → Jan. 1970: Vol. 20, no. 1 – Jun. 1979: Vol. 29, no. 6)
ISSN 0735-9268 (High Fidelity & Musical America → Oct. 1979: Vol. 29, no. 9 – Jul. 1980: Vol. 30, no. 7)
ISSN 0735-777X (High Fidelity, Musical America edition → 1980–1986)
ISSN 1042-3443 (High Fidelity → 1987: Vol. 107 – Jan./Feb. 1992: Vol. 112, no. 1)
ISSN 1933-3250 (Musical America Worldwide → 2005–2012)
ISSN 0735-6692
ISSN 2994-0508

WorldCat

OCLC 1642199 (all editions) (High Fidelity → Oct. 8, 1898: Vol. 1 – Dec. 1964: Vol. 84, no. 10)
OCLC 8054877 (all editions) (High Fidelity incorporating Musical America → Feb. 1965: Vol. 15, no. 2 – Dec. 1969: Vol. 19, no. 12)
OCLC 2336463 (all editions) (Musical America and High Fidelity → Jan. 1970: Vol. 20, no. 1 – Jun. 1979: Vol. 29, no. 6)
OCLC 9505544 (all editions) (High Fidelity & Musical America → Oct. 1979: Vol. 29, no. 9 – Jul. 1980: Vol. 30, no. 7)
OCLC 7081128 (all editions) (High Fidelity, Musical America edition → 1980–1986)
OCLC 15189010 (all editions) (Musical America → Mar. 1987: Vol. 107, no. 1 – Jan./Feb. 1992: Vol. 112, no. 1)
OCLC 62706541 (all editions) (Musical America Worldwide → 2005–2012)

Musical America, issues published from 1898 through 1922, is Accessible via RIPM → Répertoire international de la presse musicale [Retrospective Index to Music Periodicals].
Digitized issues are also available online via Internet Archive. Also, various digitized early issues – from as early as August 12, 1916. Vol. 24, no. 15, through about June 10, 1929. Vol. 49, no. 14. – are available online via Google Books.
