= List of symphony composers =

This is a list of composers who have written symphonies, listed in chronological order by year of birth, alphabetical within year. It includes only composers of significant fame, notability or importance who have Wikipedia articles. For lists of music composers by other classifications, see Lists of composers.

== 1600–1699 ==
- Lodovico Grossi da Viadana (c. 1560-1627), Italian composer of 18 sinfonias scored for eight unspecified instruments which were published in 1610 in his opus 18 collection Sinfonie musicali.
- Leonora Duarte (1610-c. 1678), Flemish composer from a Portuguese Jewish family who composed 7 sinfonias scored for five viols sometime between 1625 and 1650 which survive in a manuscript held at the Christ Church College Library at Oxford University.
- Antonio Caldara (1670–1736), Italian composer of a dozen sinfonie.
- Tomaso Albinoni (1671–1751), Italian violinist, singer, and composer of eight sinfonie
- Giovanni Porta (c. 1675–1755), Italian composer of a sinfonia in D.
- Antonio Vivaldi (1678–1741), Italian violinist, teacher, cleric, and composer of 21 string sinfonie
- Christoph Graupner (1683–1760), German composer of at least 113 symphonies
- Giuseppe Matteo Alberti (1684–1751), Italian composer of the Sinfonia Teatrale.
- Francesco Manfredini (1684–1762), Italian composer of numerous sinfonie.
- Domenico Scarlatti (1685–1757), Italian composer famous for keyboard sonatas but also a writer of sinfonie for strings.
- Benedetto Marcello (1686–1739), Italian composer of 7 sinfonie
- Johann Friedrich Fasch (1688–1758), German violinist and composer of at least 19 symphonies for strings
- Giuseppe Antonio Brescianello (c. 1690–1758), Italian composer of at least 6 symphonies
- Giovanni Antonio Giay (1690–1764), Italian composer of 5 symphonies
- Leonardo Vinci (1690–1730), Italian composer known for opera, but writer of a sinfonia for strings.
- Giuseppe Tartini (1692–1770), Italian composer of a sinfonia in A.
- Christoph Förster (1693–1745), German composer of at least 15 symphonies
- Johan Helmich Roman (1694–1758), Swedish composer of at least 21 symphonies
- Johann Melchior Molter (1696–1765), German composer of more than 140 symphonies
- Andrea Zani (1696–1757), Italian violinist and composer of the earliest securely dated symphonies (part of his Op. 2, published in 1729)
- Johann Adolph Hasse (1699–1783), German singer, teacher, and composer of six symphonies

== 1700–1749 ==
- Giovanni Battista Sammartini (c. 1701–1775), Italian oboist, organist, choirmaster, teacher, and composer of at least 67 symphonies (often confused with his brother, Giuseppe Sammartini, who did not compose any symphonies)
- Johan Agrell (1701–1765), German-Swedish composer of at least 22 symphonies
- Johann Gottlieb Graun (1703–1771), German violinist and composer of about 100 symphonies
- Carl Heinrich Graun (1704–1759), German composer of 1 symphony
- Carlos Seixas (1704–1742), Portuguese composer of at least 3 symphonies
- Andrea Bernasconi (1706–1784), Italian composer of about 20 symphonies
- Antonio Brioschi (fl. c. 1725–1750), Italian composer of at least 26 symphonies
- Carl Höckh (1707–1773), German composer of 11 symphonies
- Giovanni Battista Martini (1707–1784), Italian composer of 24 symphonies
- Johann Gottlieb Janitsch (1708 – c. 1763), Silesian composer of at least 7 symphonies
- Johann Adolf Scheibe (1708–1760), German-Danish composer of more than 70 symphonies
- Franz Benda (1709–1786), Bohemian composer of 17 symphonies
- Franz Xaver Richter (1709–1789), Austro-Moravian singer, violinist, composer, conductor, music theoretician, and composer of at least 69 symphonies
- Christoph Schaffrath (1709–1763), German composer of at least 5 symphonies
- Thomas Arne (1710–1778), British composer of roughly a dozen symphonies originally written as overtures to stage works
- Wilhelm Friedemann Bach (1710–1784), Eldest son of Johann Sebastian Bach, and a German composer of 8 symphonies
- Giuseppe Bonno (1711–1788), Austrian composer of at least 3 symphonies
- William Boyce (1711–1779), English composer whose Op. 2 is a set of 8 "symphonies", although they started life as overtures to other works
- Jean-Joseph Cassanéa de Mondonville (1711–1772), French composer of 6 symphonies
- Ignaz Holzbauer (1711–1783), Austro-German composer of 69 symphonies
- Frederick the Great (1712–1786), King of Prussia, composer of 4 symphonies
- Antoine Dauvergne (1713–1797), French composer of 4 symphonies
- Johann Ludwig Krebs (1713–1780), German composer of 2 symphonies
- Carl Philipp Emanuel Bach (1714–1788), German composer of 17 symphonies, with several more being also attributed to him
- Christoph Willibald Gluck (1714–1787), German opera reformer of at least several symphonies
- Georg Christoph Wagenseil (1715–1777), Austrian composer of several symphonies
- Georg Matthias Monn (1717–1750), composer of the first symphony (1740) with a minuet as the third movement
- Johann Stamitz (1717–1757), Czech composer of 58 symphonies, and the first composer to regularly include a minuet as the third movement
- Wenzel Raimund Birck (1718–1763), Austrian composer of pre-Classical "sinfonie", as well as a few symphonies of the evolved form
- Leopold Mozart (1719–1787), Austrian violinist and composer who wrote symphonies in which he included (natural) French horns
- Georg Benda (1722–1795), Czech composer of about 30 symphonies
- Carl Friedrich Abel (1723–1787), German viola da gamba virtuoso and composer, later active in London, wrote 43 symphonies, one of which was misattributed in the 19th century to Wolfgang Amadeus Mozart as his Symphony No. 3
- Johann Hartmann (1726–1793), Danish composer of 4 symphonies, grandfather of Johan Peter Emilius Hartmann
- Johann Wilhelm Hertel (1727–1789), German composer of many symphonies
- Florian Leopold Gassmann (1729–1774), German-speaking Bohemian composer of 32 symphonies
- Pierre van Maldere (1729–1768), Belgian composer of about 45 symphonies
- František Xaver Pokorný (1729–1794), Bohemian composer of about 140 symphonies, 104 of which were deliberately misattributed to other composers in 1796 by Theodor von Schacht
- Jean-Baptiste Cardonne (1730–1792), French composer of at least 2 symphonies
- John Valentine (1730–1791), English composer of Eight Easy Symphonies (1782)
- Christian Cannabich (1731–1798), German composer of the Mannheim school, who wrote about 70 symphonies
- František Xaver Dušek (1731–1799), Czech composer of 37 symphonies
- Gaetano Pugnani (1731–1798), Italian violinist and composer of at least 12 symphonies
- Johann Christoph Friedrich Bach (1732–1795), of German composer of 28 symphonies, most of which are lost. He was the fifth son of Johann Sebastian Bach.
- Joseph Haydn (1732–1809), Austrian composer, one of the best-known Classical composers of symphonies, he wrote 106 examples, combining wit and structural clarity (see the List of symphonies by Joseph Haydn and the Category of Haydn symphonies)
- Franz Ignaz von Beecke (1733–1803), German composer of at least 33 symphonies
- Anton Fils (1733–1760), German composer who wrote at least 40 symphonies for the Mannheim orchestra
- Franz Ignaz Beck (1734–1809), German composer of about 25 symphonies
- François-Joseph Gossec (1734–1829), French composer of over 60 symphonies
- Karl von Ordoñez (1734–1786), Austrian composer of some 73 symphonies
- Luka Sorkočević (1734–1789), Croatian composer of 8 symphonies
- Johann Christian Bach (1735–1782), German composer, son of Johann Sebastian Bach, wrote at least 28 symphonies
- John Collett, British composer of 6 symphonies (1767)
- Ernst Wilhelm Wolf (1735–1792), German composer of at least 12 symphonies
- Ignaz Fränzl (1736–1811), German composer of 2 symphonies
- Michael Haydn (1737–1806), Austrian composer of 41 symphonies (brother of the more famous Joseph Haydn).
- Josef Mysliveček (1737–1781), Czech composer of over 45 symphonies
- Antonio Boroni (1738–1792), Italian composer of 1 symphony
- William Herschel (1738–1822), German-born British astronomer, and composer of 18 symphonies for small orchestra and 6 symphonies for large orchestra
- Leopold Hofmann (1738–1793), Austrian composer of several symphonies
- Carl Ditters von Dittersdorf (1739–1799), Austrian composer of at least 120 symphonies
- Johann Baptist Wanhal (1739–1813), Bohemian composer of 51 published symphonies
- Ernst Eichner (1740–1777), German composer of 31 symphonies
- Andrea Luchesi (1741–1801), Italian composer of at least 8 surviving symphonies
- Johann Gottlieb Naumann (1741–1801), German composer of 12 symphonies
- Wenzel Pichl (1741–1805), Austrian composer of about 89 symphonies
- Henri-Joseph Rigel (1741–1799), German–French composer of at least 15 symphonies
- Simon Le Duc (1742–1777), French composer of at least 4 surviving symphonies
- Anton Ferdinand Titz (1742–1811), German composer of symphonies
- Luigi Boccherini (1743–1805), Italian composer of about 30 symphonies
- Marianna Martines (1744-1812), Spanish-descended Austrian composer of a Sinfonia in C major in three movements (c. 1770)
- John Abraham Fisher (1744–1806), English composer of 6 symphonies (1772)
- Maxim Berezovsky (c. 1745–1777), Ukrainian composer of at least 1 symphony
- Gaetano Brunetti (1745–1798), Italian composer of at least 29 symphonies
- Chevalier de Saint-Georges (1745–1799), French composer of 2 symphonies and 8 Symphonies concertantes
- Georg Druschetzky (1745–1819), Czech composer of at least 27 symphonies
- Carl Stamitz (1745–1801), composer of over 50 symphonies
- Josef Bárta (c. 1746–1787), Czech composer of 13 symphonies
- Giuseppe Cambini (1746–1825), Italian violinist and composer of about 90 symphonies
- Felice Alessandri (1747–1798), Italian composer of 6 symphonies
- Leopold Koželuch (1747–1818), Czech composer of about 30 symphonies
- Josef Fiala (1748–1816), Bohemian composer of several symphonies
- Theodor von Schacht (1748–1823), German composer of at least 33 symphonies
- Georg Joseph Vogler (1749–1814), German composer of 1 symphony

== 1750–1799 ==
- Antonio Rosetti (c. 1750–1792), Bohemian composer, wrote about 50 symphonies
- Johann Franz Xaver Sterkel (1750–1817), German composer of at least 24 symphonies
- William Smethergell (1751-c1836), English composer of two sets of six overture-symphonies (Op. 2, 1778 and Op. 5, 1880)
- Muzio Clementi (1752–1832), Italian-British composer of as many as twenty symphonies of which only six survive, 2 with opus numbers and 4 without.
- Justin Heinrich Knecht (1752–1817), German composer of 1 symphony
- John Marsh (1752–1828), English composer of at least 39 symphonies
- Ambrogio Minoja (1752–1825), Italian composer of 1 symphony
- Jean-Baptiste Bréval (1753–1823), French composer of at least 9 concertante symphonies (of which two are lost) for several instruments
- Franz Anton Hoffmeister (1754–1812), German composer of over 50 symphonies
- Peter Winter (1754–1825), German composer of 3 symphonies
- Antoine-Frédéric Gresnick (1755–1799), Belgian composer of 1 symphony and 1 concertante symphony for clarinet, bassoon and orchestra
- Joseph Martin Kraus (1756–1792), German-Swedish composer of over 20 symphonies, not all of which survive
- Wolfgang Amadeus Mozart (1756–1791), Austrian composer, one of the best-known Classical symphonists. Wrote around 50 symphonies, 41 of which are numbered (see the List of symphonies by Wolfgang Amadeus Mozart and the Category of Mozart symphonies)
- Johann Vogel (1756–1788), German composer of 3 symphonies
- Pavel Vranický (1756–1808), Bohemian composer of about 50 symphonies
- Ignaz Pleyel (1757–1831), Austrian composer, publisher, and piano maker, wrote 41 symphonies
- Alessandro Rolla (1757–1841), Italian composer of symphonies
- António Leal Moreira (1758–1819), Portuguese composer of 3 orchestral symphonies and 1 for six organs
- François Devienne (1759–1803), French flautist and composer of 1 symphony and 8 concertante symphonies
- Franz Krommer (1759–1831), Czech composer of at least 10 symphonies
- Luigi Cherubini (1760–1842), Italian composer (active in France) of the Symphony in D major (1815).
- Friedrich Ludwig Aemilius Kunzen (1761–1817), German-born Danish composer of 1 symphony
- Antonín Vranický (1761–1820), Czech composer of at least 15 symphonies, half-brother of Pavel Vranický
- Paul Alday (1763–1835), French-Irish composer of 2 symphonies written in Dublin, circa 1819.
- Franz Danzi (1763–1826), German composer of at least 6 symphonies, plus several sinfonie concertante
- Adalbert Gyrowetz (1763–1850), Bohemian composer of around 60 symphonies, many of them commissioned by Johann Peter Salomon in London.
- Étienne Méhul (1763–1817), French composer of at least 4 symphonies
- Anton Eberl (1765–1807), Austrian composer of 5 symphonies
- Joseph Leopold Eybler (1765–1846), Austrian composer of 2 symphonies
- Samuel Wesley (1766–1837), English composer of 6 symphonies
- Francesco Basili (1767–1850), Italian composer of at least 1 symphony (Sinfonia a piena orchestra sullo stile d'Haydn, 1841)
- Andreas Romberg (1767–1821), German composer of 10 symphonies of which only 6 survive, 4 with opus numbers and 2 without.
- Bernhard Romberg (1767–1841), German composer of 4 symphonies
- Carlos Baguer (1768–1808), Spanish composer of 19 symphonies
- Carl Andreas Göpfert (1768–1818), German composer of 3 symphonies
- Józef Elsner (1769–1854), Polish composer of 8 symphonies
- Ferdinando Carulli (1770-1841), Italian guitarist and composer of 4 symphonies featuring guitar
- Ludwig van Beethoven (1770–1827), German composer (often considered the greatest of all symphonists) of 9 symphonies, of which the ninth (Choral, 1824) includes mixed chorus and parts for soprano, alto, tenor, and baritone in its finale; in addition, the composer also left sketches for a tenth symphony, later elaborated by Barry Cooper in 1988—see Category of Beethoven symphonies. Finally, the orchestral work Wellington's Victory, Op. 91 (1813) is sometimes referred to as the "Battle Symphony."
- Anton Reicha (1770–1836), Czech–French composer of at least 12 symphonies
- Friedrich Witt (1770–1836), German composer of 23 symphonies
- Ferdinando Paer (1771–1839), Italian composer of 3 symphonies
- Antonio Casimir Cartellieri (1772–1807), Polish–Austrian composer of 4 symphonies
- Johann Wilhelm Wilms (1772–1847), German-born Dutch composer of 7 symphonies
- William Horsley (1774–1858), English composer of 3 symphonies (1801)
- Václav Jan Tomášek (1774–1850), Czech composer of 3 symphonies
- Christoph Ernst Friedrich Weyse (1774–1842), German-born Danish composer of 7 symphonies
- João Domingos Bomtempo (1775–1842), Portuguese composer of 2 symphonies
- William Crotch (1775–1847), English composer of 2 symphonies (1814, 1817, the second unfinished)
- E. T. A. Hoffmann (1776–1822), German writer and composer of 1 symphony
- Joseph Küffner (1776–1856), German composer of 7 symphonies
- Sigismund von Neukomm (1778–1858), Austrian composer of 2 symphonies
- Fernando Sor (1778–1839), Spanish composer of 3 symphonies
- Joachim Nicolas Eggert (1779–1813), Swedish composer of 4 finished and 1 unfinished symphonies
- José Eulalio Samayoa (1780–1866), Guatemalan composer of 3 extant symphonies
- François-Joseph Fétis (1784–1871), Belgian musicologist and composer of 2 symphonies
- George Onslow (1784–1853), French composer of 4 symphonies in a style combining echoes of Beethoven and Schubert
- Ferdinand Ries (1784–1838), German composer of 8 symphonies, 1 of which is unpublished
- Louis Spohr (1784–1859), German composer of 10 symphonies
- Karol Kurpiński (1785–1857), Polish composer of 1 symphony
- Henry Bishop (1786–1855), English composer of 1 symphony
- Friedrich Schneider (1786–1853), German composer of 23 symphonies
- Carl Maria von Weber (1786–1826), German composer of 2 symphonies, both in C major.
- Johann Peter Pixis (1788–1874), German pianist and composer of 1 symphony
- Friedrich Ernst Fesca (1789–1826), German composer of 3 symphonies
- Ludwig Wilhelm Maurer (1789–1878), German composer of 1 symphony plus a Sinfonia concertante for four violins and orchestra
- Karol Lipiński (1790–1861), Polish violinist and composer of 3 symphonies
- Carl Czerny (1791–1857), Austrian composer of 7 symphonies
- Ferdinand Hérold (1791–1833), French composer of 2 symphonies
- Franz Xaver Wolfgang Mozart (1791–1844), Austrian composer of 1 symphony
- Jan Václav Voříšek (1791–1825), Czech composer of 1 symphony
- Cipriani Potter (1792–1871), English composer of 9 symphonies
- Anselm Hüttenbrenner (1794–1868), Austrian composer of 2 symphonies
- Ignaz Moscheles (1794–1870), Czech composer of 1 symphony
- Franz Berwald (1796–1868), Swedish composer of 4 numbered symphonies, preceded by a Symphony in A major (1820), of which only a fragment of the first movement is extant—see Category of Berwald symphonies.
- Carl Loewe (1796–1869), German composer of 2 symphonies
- Giovanni Pacini (1796–1867), Italian composer of 1 symphony (Dante Symphony, 1863, first performance in 1865 for the 6th centenary of the birth of the poet)
- Gaetano Donizetti (1797–1848), Italian composer of at least 15 symphonies
- Franz Schubert (1797–1828), Austrian composer of 7 complete symphonies (Nos. 1–6, 9); two completed movements from the (incomplete) eighth (Unfinished, 1822) are regularly performed. In addition to No. 8, sketches for 5 other incomplete symphonies survive, a number of which have been elaborated by other composers, in particular Brian Newbould—see Schubert's symphonies and Category of Schubert symphonies.
- John Griesbach (1798–1875), English composer of 2 symphonies
- Carl Gottlieb Reissiger (1798–1859), German composer of one symphony

== 1800–1849 ==
- Vincenzo Bellini (1801–1835), Italian composer of 8 symphonies
- John Lodge Ellerton (1801–1873), English composer of 6 symphonies
- Jan Křtitel Václav Kalivoda or Johann Baptist Wenzel Kalliwoda (1801–1866), Czech composer of 7 symphonies
- Adolf Fredrik Lindblad (1801–1878), Swedish composer of 2 symphonies
- Bernhard Molique (1802–1869), German composer of 1 symphony
- Hector Berlioz (1803–1869), French composer of 4 unnumbered, programmatic symphonies: Symphonie fantastique (1830), perhaps the first true programmatic symphony; Harold en Italie (1834), for viola obbligato and orchestra; Roméo et Juliette (1839), a choral symphony with parts for contralto and tenor soloists; and, Grande symphonie funèbre et triomphale (1840), scored for concert band, solo trombone, and (optional) chorus and strings.
- Franz Lachner (1803–1890), German composer of 8 symphonies
- Mikhail Glinka (1804–1857), Russian composer of 2 unfinished symphonies, the first completed by Petr Klimov and the second On Two Russian Themes by Vissarion Shebalin
- Sir Julius Benedict (1804–1885), German–British composer of 2 symphonies
- Louise Farrenc (1804–1875), French composer of 3 symphonies
- Johan Peter Emilius Hartmann (1805–1900), Danish composer of 2 symphonies
- Juan Crisóstomo Arriaga (1806–1826), Spanish composer of 1 symphony
- Johannes Frederik Fröhlich (1806–1860), Danish composer of 1 symphony
- Ignacy Feliks Dobrzyński (1807–1867), Polish composer of 2 symphonies
- Hilarión Eslava (1807–1878), Spanish composer of 1 symphony
- Gottfried von Preyer (1807–1901), Austrian composer of 2 symphonies
- Napoléon Henri Reber (1807–1880), French composer of 4 symphonies
- Michael William Balfe (1808–1870), Irish composer of 1 symphony
- Charles Lucas (1808–1869), English composer of 3 symphonies (1826, 1829, 1830)
- Felix Mendelssohn (1809–1847), German composer of 5 numbered symphonies, the second (Lobgesang, 1840) of which is a "symphony-cantata" that includes parts for chorus, two sopranos, and tenor in the final ten of its thirteen movements—see Category of Mendelssohn symphonies. In addition, he completed 13 symphonies for strings.
- Thomas Molleson Mudie (1809–1876), English composer of 6 symphonies
- Fredrik Pacius (1809–1891), German–Finnish composer a Symphony in D minor (1850)
- Norbert Burgmüller (1810–1836), German composer of 2 symphonies
- Otto Nicolai (1810–1849), German composer of 2 symphonies
- Robert Schumann (1810–1856), German composer of 4 symphonies, as well as an earlier incomplete Symphony in G minor (Zwickau, WoO 29, 1832–33)—see Category of Schumann symphonies.
- Félicien David (1810–1876), French composer of 3 symphonies, as well as the choral symphony Le désert (1844), which includes parts for speaker, tenor soloist, and male chorus.
- Ferdinand Hiller (1811–1885), German composer of 4 symphonies
- Franz Liszt (1811–1886), Hungarian composer of 2 unnumbered, programmatic symphonies, of which the Faust Symphony (1854, r. 1857–61 and 1880) includes male chorus and parts for organ and tenor soloist, while the Dante Symphony (1855–56) includes women's chorus and a soprano soloist.
- Wilhelm Taubert (1811–1891), German composer of 4 symphonies
- Karl Graedener (1812–1883), German composer of 2 symphonies
- Emilie Mayer (1812–1883), German composer of 8 symphonies
- Julius Rietz (1812–1877), German composer of 3 symphonies
- Johann Rufinatscha (1812–1893), Austrian composer of 5 symphonies
- William Henry Fry (1813–1864), American composer of 7 symphonies
- George Alexander Macfarren (1813–1887), English composer of 9 symphonies
- Richard Wagner (1813–1883), German composer of the Symphony in C major (1832, r. 1882), as well as sketches for a (incomplete) Symphony in E major (1834, WWV 35)
- Mihály Mosonyi (1815–1870), Hungarian composer of 2 symphonies
- Robert Volkmann (1815–1883), German composer of 2 symphonies
- August Wilhelm Ambros (1816–1876), Austrian composer of 2 symphonies
- Franz Krenn (1816–1897), Austrian composer of 1 symphony
- Sir William Sterndale Bennett (1816–1875), English composer of 5 symphonies
- Johannes Verhulst (1816–1891), Dutch composer of 1 symphony
- Édouard Deldevez (1817–1897), French composer of at least 3 symphonies
- Eduard Franck (1817–1893), German composer of 4 symphonies, of which Nos. 1 and 2 are lost
- Niels Gade (1817–1890), Danish composer of 8 symphonies
- Fritz Spindler (1817–1905), German composer of 2 symphonies
- Charles Gounod (1818–1893), French composer of 2 numbered symphonies (a third was unfinished on his death) as well as a Petite symphonie for nine wind instruments.
- Carl Helsted (1818–1904), Danish composer of 1 symphony
- Théodore Gouvy (1819–1898), French composer of 9 symphonies
- Laura Wilson Barker (1819–1905), English composer of 1 symphony (1845)
- Oscar Byström (1821–1909), Swedish composer of 1 symphony
- August Conradi (1821–1873), German composer of 5 symphonies
- César Franck (1822–1890), Belgian composer of the Symphony in D minor (1888), known for its use of cyclic form.
- Joachim Raff (1822–1882), Swiss-born German composer of 11 numbered symphonies, of which the eleventh (Der Winter, 1876) is unfinished (completion by Max Erdmannsdörfer). Also symphonic is the Grand Symphony in E minor (WoO 18, 1854), of which only two of the five movements are extant—see Category of Raff symphonies— and the Sinfonietta (Op. 188) for wind band of 1873, believed to be the earliest work to be designated a Sinfonietta
- Carl Martin Reinthaler (1822–1896), German composer of 1 symphony
- Édouard Lalo (1823–1892), French composer of the Symphony in G minor (1886), as well as the concertante work Symphonie espagnole, for violin and orchestra, Op. 21 (1874)
- Emanuel Abraham Aguilar, English composer of 3 symphonies (1844, 1851, 1854)
- Anton Bruckner (1824–1896), Austrian composer of 9 numbered symphonies, many of which—due to edits, cuts, and revisions—exist in multiple editions. The ninth (1887–96) is only partially complete, Bruckner having left the finale unfinished (a number of composers subsequently have made completions). In addition, two completed, unnumbered symphonies survive: the Study Symphony in F minor (WAB 99, 1863; often called Symphony No. 00) and the Symphony in D minor (WAB 100, 1869; often called Symphony No. 0 or Die Nullte). Finally, sketches for a (unfinished) Symphony in B♭ major (WAB 142, 1869) also survive—see List of symphonies by Anton Bruckner and Category of Bruckner symphonies.
- Carl Reinecke (1824–1910), German composer of 3 numbered symphonies plus a symphony in G major (probably lost) and a Kinder–Sinfonie (op. 239).
- Adolphe Samuel (1824–1898), Belgian composer of 7 symphonies
- Bedřich Smetana (1824–1884), Czech composer of the Triumphal Symphony (1854, r. c. 1882; sometimes called the Festive Symphony)
- Richard Wüerst (1824–1881), German composer of 3 symphonies
- George Frederick Bristow (1825–1898), American composer of 6 symphonies
- Richard Hol (1825–1904), Dutch composer of 4 symphonies
- Walter Cecil Macfarren (1826–1905), English composer of 1 symphony
- Ernst Pauer (1826–1905), Austrian composer of 1 symphony
- Hugo Staehle (1826–1848), German composer of 1 symphony
- Julius Otto Grimm (1827–1903), German composer of 1 symphony
- Hugo Ulrich (1827–1872), German composer of two symphonies (op. 6 in B minor, 1852 and op. 9 “Triomphale” in C major, premiered 1853)
- Ludwig Meinardus (1827–1896), German composer of 2 symphonies
- Woldemar Bargiel (1828–1897), German composer of 1 symphony
- Pietro Platania (1828–1907), Italian composer of 3 symphonies
- Albert Dietrich (1829–1908), German composer of 1 symphony
- Louis Moreau Gottschalk (1829–1869), American composer of 2 symphonies: Symphonie romantique "A Night in the Tropics" and "À Montevideo"
- Anton Rubinstein (1829–1894), Russian composer of 6 symphonies
- Hans Bronsart von Schellendorff (1830–1913), German composer of 2 symphonies (both lost)
- Karl Goldmark (1830–1915), Hungarian composer of 2 symphonies
- Eduard Lassen (1830–1904), Danish–Belgian composer of 2 symphonies
- Robert Radecke (1830–1911), German composer of 1 symphony
- Henry Charles Banister (1831–1897), English composer of 4 symphonies
- Johann von Herbeck (1831–1877), Austrian composer of 4 symphonies
- Salomon Jadassohn (1831–1902), German composer of 4 symphonies
- Ludvig Norman (1831–1885), Swedish composer, conductor, pianist who wrote 3 symphonies
- Johann Joseph Abert (1832–1915), German composer of 7 symphonies
- Leopold Damrosch (1832–1885), German–American conductor and composer of 1 symphony
- Alexander Borodin (1833–1887), Russian composer of 2 symphonies, as well as sketches for two movements to a (incomplete) third symphony—subsequently orchestrated by Alexander Glazunov.
- Johannes Brahms (1833–1897), German composer—considered by Eduard Hanslick to be the artistic heir of Beethoven—of 4 symphonies, of which the first (1854–76) is sometimes referred to as "Beethoven's Tenth" (for example, by conductor Hans von Bülow)—see Category of Brahms symphonies.
- Albert Becker (1834–1899), German composer of 1 symphony
- Vilém Blodek (1834–1874), Czech composer of 1 symphony
- Amilcare Ponchielli (1834–1886), Italian composer of 2 symphonies
- Felix Draeseke (1835–1913), German composer of 4 symphonies
- Ebenezer Prout (1835–1909), English composer of 4 symphonies
- Camille Saint-Saëns (1835–1921), French composer of 3 numbered symphonies, of which the third (1886) includes a part for organ; he also completed two unnumbered symphonies, in A major (1850) and F major (Urbs Roma; 1856), respectively.
- Bernhard Scholz (1835–1916), German composer of 2 symphonies
- August Winding (1835–1899), Danish composer of 1 symphony
- Emil Hartmann (1836–1898), Danish composer of 7 symphonies
- Mily Balakirev (1837–1910), Russian composer of 2 symphonies
- John Francis Barnett (1837–1916), English composer of 1 symphony
- Théodore Dubois (1837–1924), French composer of 3 symphonies
- Alexandre Guilmant (1837–1911), French composer of 2 symphonies for organ and orchestra, which are versions of his 1st and the 8th organ sonatas, respectively
- Alfred Holmes (1837–1876), English composer of 6 symphonies (now lost)
- Karl Adolf Lorenz (1837–1923), German composer of 1 symphony
- Heinrich Urban (1837–1901), German composer of 1 symphony
- Józef Wieniawski (1837–1912), Polish pianist and composer of 1 symphony
- Georges Bizet (1838–1875), French composer of 2 symphonies. The composer referred to the second as Roma (1861–71), although it is classified often as a suite.
- Max Bruch (1838–1920), German composer of 3 symphonies
- Alexis de Castillon (1838–1873), French composer of 2 symphonies
- Heinrich Schulz-Beuthen (1838–1915), German composer of 8 symphonies (2 others are incomplete)
- Ferdinand Thieriot (1838–1919), German composer of 9 symphonies plus a sinfonietta
- Friedrich Gernsheim (1839–1916), German composer of 4 symphonies (and a fifth that survives in manuscript from his late teens)
- Henry Holmes (1839–1905), English composer of 5 symphonies (the first three lost)
- Victorin de Joncières (1839–1903), French composer of 1 symphony (Symphonie romantique)
- Eduard Nápravník (1839–1916), Czech–Russian composer of 4 symphonies
- John Knowles Paine (1839–1906), American composer of 2 symphonies
- Josef Rheinberger (1839–1901), Liechtensteiner composer of 2 symphonies
- Alice Mary Smith (1839–1884), English composer of 3 symphonies
- Louis-Albert Bourgault-Ducoudray (1840–1910), French composer of 2 symphonies (the second, Symphonie religieuse for choir and orchestra)
- Samuel de Lange jr. (1840–1911), Dutch composer of 5 symphonies
- Hermann Goetz (1840–1876), German composer of 1 symphony (1 other is incomplete)
- Ernst Rudorff (1840–1916), German composer of 3 symphonies
- Johan Svendsen (1840–1911), Norwegian composer of 2 symphonies (A third symphony allegedly was destroyed during an 1883 domestic dispute.)
- Pyotr Ilyich Tchaikovsky (1840–1893), Russian composer of 6 numbered symphonies; the programmatic Manfred Symphony, Op. 58 (1885) is unnumbered; a seventh symphony, in E♭, was abandoned in 1892 (Bogatyrev completion c. 1955), with the first movement re-scored in 1894 by the composer as Allegro Brillante for piano and orchestra—see Category of Tchaikovsky symphonies.
- Elfrida Andrée (1841–1929), Swedish composer of 2 orchestral and 2 organ symphonies
- Giovanni Bolzoni (1841–1919), Italian composer of 1 symphony
- Antonín Dvořák (1841–1904), Czech composer of 9 symphonies; many of his symphonies utilize Bohemian folk elements, while the ninth (From the New World, 1893) was inspired by Native American music and African-American spirituals—see Category of Dvořák symphonies.
- Giovanni Sgambati (1841–1914), Italian composer of 2 numbered symphonies plus "Sinfonia-Epitalamio" and "Sinfonia Festosa"
- Arrigo Boito (1842–1918), Italian composer of 1 symphony
- Heinrich Hofmann (1842–1902), German composer of 1 symphony
- Ödön Mihalovich (1842–1929), Hungarian composer of 4 symphonies
- Arthur Sullivan (1842–1900), British composer of 1 symphony
- Edvard Grieg (1843–1907), Norwegian composer of the Symphony in C minor (1864), as well as sketches for a second.
- Asger Hamerik (1843–1923), Danish conductor and composer of 8 symphonies
- Heinrich von Herzogenberg (1843–1900), Austrian composer of 8 symphonies
- Charles Lefebvre (1843–1917), French composer of 1 symphony
- Miguel Marqués (1843–1918), Spanish composer of 5 symphonies
- Hermann Graedener (1844–1929), German composer of 2 symphonies
- Émile Paladilhe (1844–1926), French composer of 1 symphony
- Nikolai Rimsky-Korsakov (1844–1908), Russian composer of 3 symphonies, the second of which (Antar, Op. 9; 1868, r. 1897 and 1903) the composer later reclassified as a symphonic suite; in addition, he left sketches for two other symphonies.
- Charles-Marie Widor (1844–1937), French composer of 6 orchestral symphonies and 10 symphonies for organ
- August Bungert (1845–1915), German composer of 1 symphony (Sinfonia Vietrix op. 70 for choir, solo voices and orchestra)
- Anastazy Wilhelm Dreszer (1845–1907), Polish composer of 2 symphonies
- Gabriel Fauré (1845–1924), French composer of 1 symphony (Op. 40, unpublished, the manuscript was destroyed; material was re-used in the late violin sonata n. 2 Op.108 and cello sonata n. 1 Op.109)
- Ignaz Brüll (1846–1907), Austrian composer of 1 symphony
- William W. Gilchrist (1846–1916), American composer of at least one symphony
- Zygmunt Noskowski (1846–1909), Polish composer of 3 symphonies
- Thomas Wingham (1846–1893), English composer of 4 symphonies
- Robert Fuchs (1847–1927), Austrian composer of 3 symphonies
- Johannes Haarklou (1847–1925), Norwegian composer of 4 symphonies
- August Klughardt (1847–1902), German composer of 6 symphonies. The first one, titled Waldleben (Life in the forest) was withdrawn
- Otto Malling (1848–1915), Danish composer of 1 symphony
- Hubert Parry (1848–1918), British composer of 5 symphonies
- Henri Dallier (1849–1934), French organist and composer of 1 symphony
- Benjamin Godard (1849–1895), French composer of 5 symphonies
- Arnold Krug (1849–1904), German composer of 2 symphonies

== 1850–1899 ==
- Tomás Bretón (1850–1923), Spanish composer of 3 symphonies (No. 1, F major, 1872; No. 2, E♭ major, 1883; and No. 3, G major, 1905)
- Zdeněk Fibich (1850–1900), Czech composer of 3 symphonies (No. 1, F major, 1883; No. 2, E♭ major, 1893; and No. 3, E minor, 1899); sketches for three other symphonic projects are also extant: two symphonies from his student years (c. 1860s), in E♭ major (two movements survive scored for string quartet) and G minor (a Scherzo survives for piano duet); and, one symphonic fragment from the year of his death
- Jacob Adolf Hägg (1850–1928), Swedish composer of 4 symphonies
- Iver Holter (1850–1941), Norwegian composer of a Symphony in F major (c. 1878–84)
- Peter Lange-Müller (1850–1926), Danish composer of 2 symphonies (No. 1, D minor, Autumn, 1879; and No. 2, D minor, 1889, r. 1915)
- Luise Adolpha Le Beau (1850–1927), German composer of 1 symphony
- Ole Olsen (1850–1927), Norwegian composer of a Symphony in G major (1876)
- Xaver Scharwenka (1850–1924), German–Polish composer of a Symphony in C minor (1882)
- Antonio Scontrino (1850–1922), Italian composer of 2 symphonies
- Alexander Taneyev (1850–1918), Russian composer of 3 symphonies
- Anton Urspruch (1850–1907), German composer of a Symphony in E♭ major (1881)
- Victor Bendix (1851–1926), Danish composer of 4 symphonies (No. 1, C major, Mountain Climbing, 1882; No. 2, D major, Sounds of Summer from South Russia, 1888; No. 3, A minor, 1895; and No. 4, D minor, 1906)
- Jan Blockx (1851–1912), Belgian composer of a Symphony in D major (1885)
- Ruperto Chapí (1851–1909), Spanish composer of a Symphony in D minor (1879)
- Vincent d'Indy (1851–1931), French composer of 3 numbered symphonies; also symphonic is the Symphony on a French Mountain Air, for piano and orchestra, Op. 25 (1886) and the programmatic symphony Jean Hundaye, Op. 5 (1874–75).
- Mykhailo Kalachevsky (1851-c.1910), Ukrainian composer of a Symphony called ''Ukrainian'' (1876)
- Antoni Stolpe (1851–1872), Polish composer of a Symphony in A minor (1867)
- Sir Frederic Hymen Cowen (1852–1935), British composer of 6 symphonies and a sinfonietta
- Hans Huber (1852–1921), Swiss composer of 8 numbered symphonies, plus an A major symphony (1889, unpublished)
- Charles Villiers Stanford (1852–1924), British composer of 7 symphonies
- Hans von Koessler (1853–1926), German composer of 2 symphonies
- André Messager (1853–1929), French composer of a Symphony in A major (1876)
- Jean Louis Nicodé (1853–1919), German composer of 1 symphony
- George Whitefield Chadwick (1854–1931), American composer of 3 symphonies
- Robert Brydges Addison (1854–1920), composer of 1 symphony (1881)
- Moritz Moszkowski (1854–1925), German pianist and composer of 1 symphony
- Bernard Zweers (1854–1924), Dutch composer of 3 symphonies (No. 1, D major, 1881; No. 2, E♭ major, 1883; and No. 3, B♭ major, To My Fatherland, 1890)
- Ernest Chausson (1855–1899), French composer of the Symphony in B♭ major (1890), as well as sketches for a second (1899)
- Michele Esposito (1855–1929), Italian composer of 2 symphonies
- Prince Heinrich XXIV Reuss of Köstritz (1855–1910), German composer of 6 symphonies
- Julius Röntgen (1855–1932), Dutch composer of 21 symphonies
- Arthur Bird (1856–1923), American composer of 1 symphony
- André Gedalge (1856–1926), French composer of 4 symphonies (the last unfinished)
- Robert Kajanus (1856–1933), Finnish composer of a Sinfonietta for Strings in B♭ major (1915); the Kalevala-based symphonic poem Aino, for male chorus and orchestra, is often misclassified as a symphony.
- Giuseppe Martucci (1856–1909), Italian composer of 2 symphonies
- Christian Sinding (1856–1941), Norwegian composer of 4 symphonies
- Sergei Taneyev (1856–1915), Russian composer of 4 symphonies
- George Templeton Strong (1856–1948), American composer of 3 symphonies
- Cécile Chaminade (1857–1944), French composer of 1 symphony (Les Amazones, for choir and orchestra)
- Frederic Cliffe (1857–1931), English composer of 2 symphonies (1889, 1892)
- Sir Edward Elgar (1857–1934), English composer of 2 symphonies, with sketches for a third elaborated into a performing version by Anthony Payne in 1997—see Category of Elgar symphonies. In addition, the composer referred to a fourth work, The Black Knight (1889–93), as a "symphony for chorus and orchestra," although it is classified typically as a cantata.
- Edgar Stillman Kelley (1857–1944), American composer of 2 symphonies
- Sylvio Lazzari (1857–1944), French composer of a Symphony in E♭ major (1907)
- Catharinus Elling (1858–1942), Norwegian composer of 2 symphonies (No. 1, A major, 1890; and No. 2, A minor, 1897)
- Richard Franck (1858–1938), German composer of 1 symphony
- Jenő Hubay (1858–1937), Hungarian violinist and composer of 4 symphonies (the last two with voices and chorus)
- Hans Rott (1858–1884), Austrian composer of a Symphony in E major (1880), as well as a Symphony for Strings in A♭ major (1875); the composer also left sketches for a second symphony
- Harry Rowe Shelley (1858–1947), American composer of 2 symphonies
- Algernon Ashton (1859–1937), English composer of 5 symphonies
- Max Fiedler (1859–1939), German conductor and composer of 1 symphony
- Gerard von Brucken Fock (1859–1935), Dutch composer of 3 symphonies
- Josef Bohuslav Foerster (1859–1951), Czech composer of 5 symphonies
- Eugène d'Harcourt (1859–1918), French composer of 3 symphonies
- Alexander Ilyinsky (1859–1920), Russian composer of 1 symphony
- Mikhail Ippolitov-Ivanov (1859–1935), Russian composer of 2 symphonies plus a "Sinfonietta for Orchestra"
- Sergei Lyapunov (1859–1924), Russian composer of 2 symphonies (No. 1, B minor, 1887; and No. 2, B♭ minor, 1917)
- Pietro Floridia (1860–1932), Italian–American composer of 1 symphony
- Alberto Franchetti (1860–1942), Italian composer of a Symphony in E minor (1885)
- Gustav Mahler (1860–1911), Austrian composer of 9 numbered symphonies, the third (1893–96) of which is his longest symphony at approximately 105 minutes, while the eighth (1906) calls for three choirs and eight vocal soloists (and premiered with over 1,000 performers); in addition, the composer also left detailed sketches for a tenth symphony, later elaborated by, among others, Deryck Cooke—see Category of Mahler symphonies. Finally, a composition for soprano, tenor, and orchestra, Das Lied von der Erde (1908–09), is classified as an unnumbered symphony.
- Ignacy Jan Paderewski (1860–1941), Polish composer of a Symphony in B minor, Op. 24 (Polonia, 1908)
- Emil von Reznicek (1860–1945), Austrian composer of 5 symphonies
- William Wallace (1860–1940), Scottish composer of a "Creation Symphony"
- Felix Woyrsch (1860–1944), German composer of 7 symphonies
- Anton Arensky (1861–1906), Russian composer of 2 symphonies (No. 1, B minor, 1883; and No. 2, A major, 1889)
- Wilhelm Berger (1861–1911), German composer of 2 symphonies
- Georgy Catoire (1861–1926), Russian composer of a Symphony in C minor (c. 1889 91, orch. 1895–98)
- Ludwig Thuille (1861–1907), Austrian composer of a Symphony in F major (1885, r. 1886)
- Léon Boëllmann (1862–1897), French composer of a Symphony in F major (1894)
- Claude Debussy (1862–1918), French composer of a two-movement Symphony in B minor (1880), scored for piano four-hands, as well as La mer (1905), a set of three "symphonic sketches" that the composer occasionally referred to as a symphony
- Maurice Emmanuel (1862–1938), French composer of 2 symphonies (No. 1, A major, 1919; and No. 2, Bretonne, A major, 1931)
- Edward German (1862–1936), English composer of 2 symphonies (No. 1, E minor, 1887, r. 1890; and No. 2, A minor, Norwich, 1893), as well as sketches for an abandoned Symphony in B♭ major, some material from which was incorporated into the Second
- Friedrich Koch (1862–1927), German composer of 2 symphonies
- Alberto Williams (1862–1952), Argentine composer of 9 symphonies
- Felix Blumenfeld (1863–1931), Russian composer of a Symphony in C minor, À la mémoire des chers défunts (1906)
- Hugo Kaun (1863–1932), German composer of 3 symphonies
- Emánuel Moór (1863–1931), Hungarian composer of 8 symphonies
- Horatio Parker (1863–1919), American composer of 1 symphony
- Arthur Somervell (1863–1937), English composer of a Symphony in D minor, Thalassa (1913)
- Jāzeps Vītols (1863–1948), Latvian composer of 2 symphonies
- Felix Weingartner (1863–1942), Austrian composer of 7 symphonies and a sinfonietta
- Eugen d'Albert (1864–1932), German composer of a Symphony in F major (1886)
- Hjalmar Borgstrøm (1864–1925), Norwegian composer of 2 symphonies
- Louis Glass (1864–1936), Danish composer of 6 symphonies (No. 1, E major, 1894; No. 2, C minor, 1899; No. 3, Wood Symphony, D major, 1901; No. 4, E minor, 1911; No. 5, Svastika, C major, 1920; and No. 6, Birth of the Scyldings, 1924), of which the Second includes parts for male chorus and organ
- Alexander Gretchaninov (1864–1956), Russian composer of 5 symphonies (No. 1, B minor, 1894; No. 2, Pastoral, A major, 1908; No. 3, E major, 1923; No. 4, C major, 1927; and No. 5, G minor, 1936); sketches exist for an unfinished Sixth (c. 1940s)
- Johan Halvorsen (1864–1935), Norwegian composer of 3 symphonies (No. 1, C minor, 1923; No. 2, Fatum, D minor, 1924, r. 1928; and No. 3, C major, 1929)
- Alexandre Levy (1864–1892), Brazilian composer of a Symphony in E minor (1888)
- Alberto Nepomuceno (1864–1920), Brazilian composer of a Symphony in G minor (1893)
- Guy Ropartz (1864–1955), French composer of 5 symphonies (No. 1, On a Breton Chorale, A minor, 1895; No. 2, F minor, 1900; No. 3, E major, 1906; No. 4, C major, 1911; and No. 5, G major, 1945), of which the Third include parts for soprano, contralto, tenor, bass, and mixed chorus; also symphonic is the Petite symphonie, for orchestra (1943)
- Richard Strauss (1864–1949), German composer of 2 early conventional symphonies; also of 2 program symphonies of his maturity, symphonic in name and scale if not traditional technique; namely the multi-section symphonic poems Symphonia Domestica, Op. 53 (1903) and An Alpine Symphony, Op. 64 (1915). His Sonatina No. 2 for 16 Wind Instruments (1946) was given the title Symphony for Wind Instruments by the publisher, though the composer did not use the word.
- August de Boeck (1865–1937), Belgian composer of a Symphony in G major (1896)
- Paul Dukas (1865–1935), French composer of a Symphony in C major (1896)
- Paul Gilson (1865–1942), Belgian composer of 3 symphonies and La Mer (4 Symphonic sketches)
- Alexander Glazunov (1865–1936), Russian composer of 8 symphonies, as well as sketches for a ninth (piano sketch, 1910; later orchestrated by Gavril Yudin)—see Category of Glazunov symphonies.
- Albéric Magnard (1865–1914), French composer of 4 symphonies (No. 1, C minor, 1890; No. 2, E major, 1893; No. 3, B♭ minor, 1896; and No. 4, C♯ minor, 1913)
- Carl Nielsen (1865–1931), Danish composer of 6 symphonies (No. 1 in G minor, 1894; No. 2, The Four Temperaments, 1902; No. 3, Sinfonia espansiva, 1911; No 4, Inextinguishable, 1916; No. 5, 1922; and No. 6, Sinfonia semplice, 1925), of which the Third utilizes a vocalise for soprano and baritone in its second movement—see Category of Nielsen symphonies
- Jean Sibelius (1865–1957), Finnish composer of 7 symphonies (No. 1, E minor, 1899, r. 1900; No. 2, D major, 1902; No. 3, C major, 1907; No. 4, A minor, 1911; No. 5, E♭ major, 1915, r. 1916, r. 1919; No. 6, D minor, 1923; and No. 7, C major, 1924), of which the Seventh (in one movement) erodes the traditional subdivisions of sonata form; the composer also destroyed sketches for an unfinished eighth in the 1930s. In addition, the choral work Kullervo (1892) and Lemminkäinen (1895)—both based upon Kalevala myths—are classified occasionally as unnumbered, programmatic symphonies—see Category of Sibelius symphonies
- Waldemar von Baußnern (1866–1931), German composer of 8 symphonies and 1 chamber symphony
- Vasily Kalinnikov (1866–1901), Russian composer of 2 symphonies (No. 1, G minor, 1895; and No. 2, A major, 1897)
- Georg Schumann (1866–1952), German composer of 2 symphonies
- Percy Sherwood (1866–1939), English composer of five symphonies (Nos. 4 and 5 are lost)
- Amy Beach (1867–1944), American composer of the Gaelic Symphony (1894), the first such work to be composed by a female American composer
- Christian Danning (1867–1925), Danish composer of 3 symphonies
- Charles Koechlin (1867–1950), French composer of 5 symphonies
- Wilhelm Peterson-Berger (1867–1942), Swedish composer of 5 symphonies
- Ewald Straesser (1867–1933), German composer of 6 symphonies (at least 3 unpublished)
- Gustav Strube (1867–1953), German–American composer of 2 symphonies
- Granville Bantock (1868–1946), British composer of 4 unnumbered symphonies, chronologically as: the Hebridean Symphony (1913); the Pagan Symphony (1927); The Cyprian Goddess (1939); and the Celtic Symphony (1940), for string orchestra and harps
- Hermann Bischoff (1868–1936), German composer of 2 symphonies
- Frederic Lamond (1868–1948), Scottish pianist and composer of 1 symphony
- Sir John Blackwood McEwen (1868–1948), Scottish composer of 5 symphonies
- José Vianna da Motta (1868–1948), Portuguese pianist and composer of 1 symphony
- Henry Walford Davies (1869–1941), English composer of 2 symphonies
- Robert Hermann (1869–1912), Swiss composer of 2 Symphonies, one in 1895 and the other in 1905.
- Alfred Hill (1869–1960), Australian composer of 12 symphonies
- Arthur Hinton (1869–1941), English composer of 2 symphonies (1894, 1903)
- Vasily Kalafati (1869–1942), Russian composer of 1 symphony
- Henryk Melcer-Szczawiński (1869–1928), Polish composer of 1 symphony
- Percy Pitt (1869–1932), English composer of 1 symphony (G minor, 1906)
- Hans Pfitzner (1869–1949), German composer of 2 symphonies plus a Kleine Sinfonie (Op. 44, 1939)
- Albert Roussel (1869–1937), French composer of 4 symphonies
- Howard Brockway (1870–1951), American composer of 1 symphony
- Ludvík Čelanský (1870–1931), Czech composer of 1 symphony
- Cornelis Dopper (1870–1939), Dutch composer of 7 symphonies
- Emil Młynarski (1870–1935), Polish composer of a Symphony in F major (Polonia, Op. 14, 1910)
- Vítězslav Novák (1870–1949), Czech composer of two unnumbered symphonies (the Autumn Symphony, 1934, for mixed chorus and orchestra; and the May Symphony, 1943, for soloists, mixed chorus, and orchestra)
- Joseph Ryelandt (1870–1965), Belgian composer of 6 symphonies
- Florent Schmitt (1870–1958), French composer of 3 symphonies, chronologically as: a Symphonie concertante, for piano and orchestra (1932); a symphony for strings, Janiana (1941); and a "Symphony No. 2" (1957)
- Hermann Suter (1870–1926), Swiss composer of a Symphony in D minor (1914)
- Charles Tournemire (1870–1939), French composer of 8 orchestral symphonies, as well as a Simphonie-choral and Symphonie sacrée for organ
- Louis Vierne (1870–1937), French composer of a Symphony in A minor (1908), as well as six numbered symphonies for solo organ
- Adolphe Biarent (1871–1916), Belgian composer of 1 symphony
- Frederick Converse (1871–1940), American composer of 5 symphonies
- Henry Kimball Hadley (1871–1937), American composer of 5 symphonies
- Sigurd Lie (1871–1904), Norwegian composer of a Symphony in A minor (1903)
- Ruben Liljefors (1871–1936), Swedish composer of a Symphony in E♭ major (1906)
- Wilhelm Stenhammar (1871–1927), Swedish composer of 2 symphonies (No. 1, F major, 1903; and No. 2, G minor, 1915), the first of which he disowned after it premiered; the composer also left a fragment for a third symphony (1918–1919)
- Alexander von Zemlinsky (1871–1942), Austrian composer of 2 numbered symphonies (No. 1, D minor, 1893; and No. 2, B♭ major, 1897), as well as a (incomplete) Symphony in E minor (1891) from his student years; also symphonic are the Lyric Symphony (1923), for soprano, baritone, and orchestra; a Sinfonietta (1934); and the symphonic fantasy Die Seejungfrau (The Mermaid, 1903)—the last a symphony in all but name
- Hugo Alfvén (1872–1960), Swedish composer of 5 symphonies (No. 1, F minor, 1897; No. 2, D major, 1898; No. 3, E major, 1905; No. 4, From the Outermost Skerries, C minor, 1919; and No. 5, A minor, 1942–53, r. 1958), of which the Fourth includes a vocalise for soprano and tenor
- Eyvind Alnæs (1872–1932), Norwegian composer of 2 symphonies (No. 1, C minor, 1897; and No. 2, D major, 1923)
- Frederic Austin (1872–1952), English baritone and composer of 1 symphony
- Felix Borowski (1872–1956), British–American composer of 3 symphonies
- Arthur Farwell (1872–1972), American composer of 1 symphony (1934), developed from a fragmentary opening left by his mentor Rudolph Gott
- Paul Graener (1872–1944), German composer of 3 symphonies and a sinfonietta (for harp and strings)
- Siegmund von Hausegger (1872–1948), Austrian composer of the Natursymphonie (Nature Symphony, 1911), the finale of which includes mixed chorus
- Edward Burlingame Hill (1872–1960), American composer of 4 symphonies
- Paul Juon (1872–1940), Russian–Swiss composer of 4 unnumbered symphonies: a Symphony in F♯ minor (1895), a Symphony in A major (1903), a Kleine Sinfonie in A minor (Little Symphony, 1929), and a Rhapsodische Sinfonie (Rhapsodic Symphony, 1939); also symphonic is a chamber symphony (1907) and a Sinfonietta capricciosa for orchestra (1939)
- Alexander Scriabin (1872–1915), Russian composer of 3 numbered symphonies (No. 1, E major, 1900; No. 2, C minor, 1901; and No. 3, The Divine Poem, C minor, 1903), of which the First includes parts for mezzo-soprano and tenor; his two tone poems, The Poem of Ecstasy (1908) and Prometheus: The Poem of Fire (1910) are classified frequently as Symphonies Nos. 4 and 5, respectively—see Category of Scriabin symphonies
- Bernhard Sekles (1872–1934), German composer of 1 symphony
- Sergei Vasilenko (1872–1956), Russian composer of 2 symphonies
- Ralph Vaughan Williams (1872–1958), English composer of 9 symphonies, the first of which (A Sea Symphony; 1903–09) includes a chorus as well as parts for soprano and baritone, while the third (A Pastoral Symphony; 1922) utilizes a vocalise for soprano in the fourth movement—see Category of Vaughan Williams symphonies.
- Dimitri Arakishvili (1873–1953), Georgian composer of 3 symphonies
- William Henry Bell (1873–1946), English composer of 5 symphonies
- Blagoje Bersa (1873–1934), Croatian composer of 1 symphony
- Joseph Jongen (1873–1953), Belgian composer of a Symphony for orchestra, Op. 15 (1898), as well as Symphonie concertante for organ and orchestra, Op. 81 (1926)
- Witold Maliszewski (1873–1939), Polish composer of 5 symphonies
- Daniel Gregory Mason (1873–1953), American composer of 3 symphonies
- Henri Rabaud (1873–1949), French composer of 2 symphonies
- Sergei Rachmaninoff (1873–1943), Russian composer of 3 numbered symphonies, as well as the choral symphony The Bells, Op. 35 (1913); also symphonic is the unfinished Youth Symphony in D minor (1891)—see Category of Rachmaninoff symphonies.
- Julius Bittner (1874–1939), Austrian composer of 2 symphonies
- Gustav Holst (1874–1934), English composer of a Symphony F major (The Cotswolds, 1900), as well as a First Choral Symphony (1924), for soprano, mixed chorus, and orchestra (fragmentary sketches also exist for a Second Choral Symphony); in addition, the composer also completed a Scherzo (1933–34) for a projected but unfinished symphony.
- Charles Ives (1874–1954), American composer of 4 numbered symphonies, the fourth (1910–1924) of which requires two conductors and includes parts for piano (four-hands); in addition, he wrote two unnumbered symphonies: New England Holidays (1897–1913) and the (unfinished) Universe Symphony (1911–28)—see Category of Ives symphonies.
- Paul Pierné (1874–1952), French composer of 2 symphonies
- Heinrich Kaspar Schmid (1874–1953), German composer of 1 symphony
- Franz Schmidt (1874–1939), Austrian composer of 4 symphonies
- Arnold Schoenberg (1874–1951), Austrian composer of 2 chamber symphonies and sketches for several (unfinished) symphonies. In addition, the tone poem Pelleas und Melisande, Op. 5 (1902–03) is sometimes considered to have symphonic qualities—for example, by Alban Berg.
- Josef Suk (1874–1935), Czech composer of 2 unnumbered symphonies: the Symphony in E major, Op. 14 (1897–99) and the Asrael Symphony, Op. 27 (1905–06)—a 'funeral symphony' in commemoration of the deaths of his wife, Otilie Suková, and of his father-in-law, Antonín Dvořák.
- Franco Alfano (1875–1954), Italian composer of 2 symphonies (No. 1, Classica, E major, 1910, r. 1953; and No. 2, C major, 1932, r. 1933)
- Julián Carrillo (1875–1965), Mexican composer, wrote 2 symphonies plus 3 atonal symphonies written in the "Thirteen Sound" technique
- Samuel Coleridge-Taylor (1875–1912), English composer of a Symphony in A minor (1896)
- Reinhold Glière (1875–1956), Russian composer of 3 symphonies (No. 1, E♭ major, 1900; No. 2, C minor, 1908; and No. 3, Ilya Muromets, B minor, 1911)
- Erkki Melartin (1875–1937), Finnish composer of 6 symphonies (No. 1, C minor, 1902; No. 2, E minor, 1904; No. 3, F major, 1907; No. 4, Summer Symphony, F major, 1912; No. 5, Sinfonia brevis, A minor, 1915; and No. 6, 1924), of which the Fourth includes a vocalise for soprano, mezzo-soprano, and contralto in its third movement; also extant are three additional symphonic projects in fragmentary form: No. 7, Sinfonia gaia (1936); No. 8 (1937); and No. 9 (c. 1930s)
- Cyril Rootham (1875–1938), English composer of 2 symphonies, of which the Second (The Revelation of St. John, 1938) is for orchestra and chorus
- Donald Tovey (1875–1940), British composer of a Symphony in D major (1913)
- Richard Wetz (1875–1935), German composer of 3 symphonies (No. 1, C minor, 1917; No. 2, A major, 1919; and No. 3, B♭ minor, 1922)
- Hakon Børresen (1876–1954), Danish composer of 3 symphonies (No. 1, C minor, 1901; No. 2, The Sea, A major, 1904; No. 3, and C major, 1926)
- Havergal Brian (1876–1972), English composer of 32 symphonies, most of which he wrote in his seventies and eighties. His first symphony, The Gothic, is one of the largest symphonies ever written
- John Alden Carpenter (1876–1951), American composer of 2 symphonies
- Mieczysław Karłowicz (1876–1909), Polish composer of 1 symphony
- Ludolf Nielsen (1876–1939), Danish composer of 3 symphonies (B minor, 1903; E major, Symphony of Joy, 1909; and C major, 1913)
- Bruno Walter (1876–1962), German conductor and composer of 2 symphonies
- Ermanno Wolf-Ferrari (1876–1948), Italian-German composer of the Sinfonia da camera (Chamber Symphony) in B♭ major (1901), as well as Sinfonia brevis in E♭ major (1947), for orchestra
- Sergei Bortkiewicz (1877–1952), Austrian pianist and composer of 2 symphonies
- Ernő Dohnányi (1877–1960), Hungarian composer of two numbered symphonies (D minor, 1901; and E major, 1945, r. 1957), as well as an earlier Symphony in F major (1896)
- Thomas Dunhill (1877–1946), English composer of 1 symphony (Belgrade in A minor, 1916)
- Albert Dupuis (1877–1967), Belgian composer of 2 symphonies
- Rudolph Ganz (1877–1972), Swiss–American composer of 1 symphony
- Luis Gianneo (1877–1968), Argentine composer of 1 symphony
- Alexander Goedicke (1877–1957), Russian composer of 3 symphonies
- Jean Huré (1877–1930), French composer of 3 symphonies
- Paul Ladmirault (1877–1944), French composer of 1 symphony
- Ernst Mielck (1877–1899), Finnish composer of the Symphony in F minor (1897)
- Roderich Mojsisovics von Mojsvar (1877–1953), Austrian composer of 3 symphonies
- Feliks Nowowiejski (1877–1946), Polish composer of 4 symphonies
- David Stanley Smith (1877–1945), American composer of 5 symphonies
- Rutland Boughton (1878–1960), English composer of 3 symphonies
- Fritz Brun (1878–1959), Swiss conductor and composer of 10 symphonies
- Adam Carse (1878–1958), English composer of 2 symphonies for strings
- Antun Dobronić (1878–1955), Croatian composer of 8 symphonies
- Carl Ehrenberg (1878–1962), German composer of 2 symphonies
- Harry Farjeon (1878–1948), English composer of the Symphony in D major
- Joseph Holbrooke (1878–1958), English composer of 9 symphonies
- Artur Kapp (1878–1952), Estonian composer. Generally considered to be one of the founders of Estonian symphonic music. He wrote 5 symphonies
- Arrigo Pedrollo (1878–1964), Italian composer of 1 symphony
- Franz Schreker (1878–1934), Austrian composer of 1 symphony (unpublished) and 1 chamber symphony
- Volkmar Andreae (1879–1962), Swiss composer of 2 symphonies
- Natanael Berg (1879–1957), Swedish composer of 5 symphonies
- Frank Bridge (1879–1941), English composer of an unfinished Symphony for Strings (1941)
- Grzegorz Fitelberg (1879–1953), Polish composer of 2 symphonies
- Philippe Gaubert (1879–1941), French composer of a Symphony in F major (1936)
- Sir Hamilton Harty (1879–1941), Irish composer of An Irish Symphony (1904, r. 1915, 1924)
- Otto Olsson (1879–1964), Swedish composer of 1 symphony, Op.11 (1901–02)
- Otakar Ostrčil (1879–1935), Czech composer of 1 symphony and 1 sinfonietta
- Ottorino Respighi (1879–1936), Italian composer of the Sinfonia drammatica (1914)
- Cyril Scott (1879–1970), English composer of 4 symphonies
- Johanna Senfter (1879–1961), German composer of 9 symphonies
- Julius Weismann (1879–1950), German composer of 3 symphonies
- Adolf Wiklund (1879–1950), Swedish composer of 1 symphony
- Edgar Bainton (1880–1956), British composer of 4 symphonies
- Ernest Bloch (1880–1959), American composer of Swiss origin, whose works include (in addition to an unpublished Symphonie orientale amongst his juvenilia) a Symphony in C♯ minor, a Sinfonia Breve, a Symphony for Trombone and Orchestra, and a Symphony in E♭
- Désiré-Émile Inghelbrecht (1880–1965), French composer of a Sinfonia brève da camera (1930)
- Rudolf Karel (1880–1945), Czech composer of 4 symphonies (the second for violin and orchestra)
- Ildebrando Pizzetti (1880–1968), Italian composer of "Symphony in A" and "Sinfonia del fuoco" (from music for the silent film Cabiria)
- Béla Bartók (1881–1945), Hungarian composer of unfinished Symphony in E♭ major (1902) Only scherzo finished, completed by Denijs Dille
- Charles Wakefield Cadman (1881–1946), American composer of 1 symphony (Pennsylvania Symphony)
- Nancy Dalberg (1881–1949), Danish composer of 1 symphony (the first symphony written by a Danish female composer)
- Sem Dresden (1881–1957), Dutch composer of 1 sinfonietta for clarinet and orchestra and 1 concertante symphony
- George Enescu (1881–1955), Romanian violinist, pianist, cellist, conductor, teacher, and composer of 3 (acknowledged and complete) numbered symphonies, as well as 2 unfinished symphonies elaborated by Pascal Bentoiu as No. 4 and No. 5, respectively. (In addition, among the composer's juvenilia are 4 early "Study Symphonies".) Also symphonic are the Chamber Symphony, for 12 instruments, Op. 33 (1954), and the Symphonie concertante in B minor, for cello and orchestra, Op. 8 (1901).
- Jan van Gilse (1881–1944), Dutch composer of 4 symphonies (No. 1, F major, 1901; No. 2, E♭ major, 1902; No. 3, Elevation, D minor, 1907; and No. 4, A major, 1915), of which the Third includes a part for soprano soloist; the composer also left sketches for a Fifth
- Peder Gram (1881–1956), Danish composer of 3 symphonies
- Edvin Kallstenius (1881–1967), Swedish composer of 5 symphonies and 4 sinfoniettas
- Paul Le Flem (1881–1984), French composer of 4 symphonies
- Nikolai Myaskovsky (1881–1950), Russian composer of 27 symphonies, as well as 3 sinfoniettas for strings.
- Nikolai Roslavets (1881–1944), Russian composer of 1 symphony and 1 chamber symphony
- Karl Weigl (1881–1949), Austrian composer of 6 symphonies
- Artur Schnabel (1882–1951), Austrian composer of 3 symphonies
- Marion Bauer (1882–1955), American composer of 1 symphony
- Walter Braunfels (1882–1954), German composer of 1 symphony (Sinfonia brevis op. 69) plus a Sinfonia concertante for violin, viola, 2 horns and strings
- Alf Hurum (1882–1972), Norwegian composer of a Symphony in D minor (1927)
- Zoltán Kodály (1882–1967), Hungarian composer of 1 symphony
- Gian Francesco Malipiero (1882–1973), Italian composer of 11 symphonies
- Gino Marinuzzi (1882–1945), Italian composer of 1 symphony
- Joseph Marx (1882–1964), Austrian composer of An Autumn Symphony (1921), the final movement of which the composer replaced in 1946 with the newly-composed tone poem Autumnal Revelries; also symphonic is the Sinfonia in modo classico, originally written for string quartet (1941) but later arranged for string orchestra in 1944
- John Powell (1882–1963), American composer of a Symphony in A major, Virginia Symphony (1945, r. 1951)
- Lazare Saminsky (1882–1959), Russian–American composer of 5 symphonies
- Igor Stravinsky (1882–1971), Russian composer of 3 (purely orchestral) unnumbered symphonies, as well as the choral symphony Symphony of Psalms (1930, r. 1948)—see Category of Stravinsky symphonies. Finally, the chamber piece Symphonies of Wind Instruments (1920, r. 1947) uses the word 'symphony' in the old (Greek) sense of "sounding together."
- Karol Szymanowski (1882–1937), Polish composer of 4 symphonies, of which the third (The Song of the Night, 1914–16) includes mixed chorus and a part for tenor (or soprano) soloist, while the fourth (Symphonie concertante, 1932) is a concertante work for piano and orchestra—see Category of Szymanowski symphonies.
- Joaquín Turina (1882–1949), Spanish composer of "Sinfonía sevillana" (1920) and "Sinfonía del mar" (1945)
- Hermann Wolfgang von Waltershausen (1882–1954), German composer of 1 symphony
- Paul Hastings Allen (1883–1952), American composer of 8 symphonies
- Hubert Bath (1883–1945), English composer of Freedom: Brass Band Symphony No 1 (1922), considered to be the first symphony for brass band.
- Sir Arnold Bax (1883–1953), English composer of 7 numbered symphonies, preceded by a Symphony in F major (completed piano score 1907; orchestrated in 2012–13 by Martin Yates); the tone poem Spring Fire (1913) is classified occasionally as an unnumbered, programmatic symphony. Bax also composed a Sinfonietta—see Category of Bax symphonies
- Alfredo Casella (1883–1947), Italian composer of 3 symphonies (No. 1, B minor, 1906; No. 2, C minor, 1909; and No. 3, titled Sinfonia, 1940)
- Sir George Dyson (1883–1964), English composer of 1 symphony, plus a Choral Symphony, composed in 1910 but not premiered until 2014.
- Joseph Matthias Hauer (1883–1959), Austrian composer of 1 symphony and 1 sinfonietta
- Manolis Kalomiris (1883–1962), Greek composer of 3 symphonies (No. 1, Leventia, for mixed chorus and orchestra, 1920, r. 1937, 1952; No. 2, Symphony of the Simple and Good People, for mezzo-soprano, mixed chorus, and orchestra, 1931; and No. 3, Palamiki, D minor, for reciter and orchestra, 1955)
- Paul von Klenau (1883–1946), Danish composer of 9 symphonies
- Alexander Krein (1883–1951), Russian composer of 1 symphony
- Toivo Kuula (1883–1918), Finnish composer of an incomplete, projected Symphony, Op. 36 (1918), of which only the Introduction was sketched.
- Maximilian Steinberg (1883–1946), Russian composer of 5 symphonies
- Anton Webern (1883–1945), Austrian composer of 1 symphony (1928)
- Boris Asafyev (1884–1949), Russian composer of 5 symphonies
- York Bowen (1884–1961), English composer of 3 symphonies, of which the third (1951) exists only in recorded form. (The score was lost in a publishing house flood.)
- Louis Gruenberg (1884–1964), Russian–American composer of 5 symphonies
- Arthur Meulemans (1884–1966), Belgian composer of 15 symphonies
- Ture Rangström (1884–1947), Swedish composer of 4 symphonies (No. 1, August Strindberg in memoriam, C♯ minor, 1914; No. 2, My Country, D minor, 1919; No. 3, Song under the Stars, D♭ major, in one movement, 1929; and No. 4, Invocatio, D minor, for organ and orchestra, 1936)
- Albert Wolff (1884–1970), French conductor and composer of 1 symphony
- Julio Fonseca (1885–1950), Costa Rican composer of the "Great Symphonic Fantasy on folk motifs"
- Henri Collet (1885–1951), French composer of "Symphonie de l'Alhambra" (1947)
- Dimitrie Cuclin (1885–1978), Romanian composer of 20 symphonies
- Werner Josten (1885–1963), German–American composer of 1 symphony
- Otto Klemperer (1885–1973), German conductor and composer of 6 symphonies
- Artur Lemba (1885–1963), Estonian composer of 2 symphonies
- Dora Pejačević (1885–1923), Croatian composer of a Symphony in F♯ minor (1917, r. 1920)
- Wallingford Riegger (1885–1961), American composer of 4 symphonies
- Egon Wellesz (1885–1974), Austrian musicologist and composer of 9 symphonies
- John J. Becker (1886–1961), American composer of 7 symphonies
- Edward Joseph Collins (1886–1951), American composer of a Symphony in B minor, Nos habeit humus (1925)
- Marcel Dupré (1886–1971), French composer of a Symphony in G minor, for organ and orchestra (1927); also symphonic are two works for solo organ (Symphonie-Passion, 1924; and Symphony No. 2 in C♯ minor, 1929) and a Sinfonia, for piano and organ (1946)
- Óscar Esplá (1886–1976), Spanish composer of 2 symphonies
- Wilhelm Furtwängler (1886–1954), German composer of 3 symphonies
- Henri Gagnebin (1886–1977), Belgian–Swiss composer of 4 symphonies
- Carlo Giorgio Garofalo (1886–1962), Italian composer of 2 symphonies
- Jesús Guridi (1886–1961), Spanish composer of "Sinfonía pirenaica" ("Pyrenean Symphony", 1945)
- Robert Heger (1886–1978), German conductor and composer of 3 symphonies
- Jef van Hoof (1886–1959), Belgian composer of 6 symphonies
- R. O. Morris (1886–1948), English composer of a Sinfonia in C (1928–29 and a Symphony in D (1934)
- Paul Paray (1886–1979), French composer of 2 symphonies plus a "Symphonie d'archets" for string orchestra
- Kosaku Yamada (1886–1965), First Japanese symphonic composer. He wrote 3 symphonies; the first being traditional, the second more akin of a symphonic poem and the third with Japanese traditional music and a voice. Finally there is also a choreographic symphony on a unrealized ballet titled "Maria Magdalena".
- Kurt Atterberg (1887–1974), Swedish composer of 9 symphonies, of which the Ninth includes parts for mezzo-soprano, baritone, and mixed chorus; also symphonic is the Sinfonia for Strings (1953)
- Bernard van Dieren (1887–1936), Dutch composer of the Chinese Symphony (1914) and an unfinished symphony In Three Dance Movements
- Josef Jonsson (1887–1969), Swedish composer of 3 symphonies (1919–22; 1931; 1947) and a chamber symphony (1949)
- Oskar Lindberg (1887–1955), Swedish composer of the Symphony in F major (1916)
- Leevi Madetoja (1887–1947), Finnish composer of 3 symphonies (No. 1, F major, 1916; No. 2, E♭ major, 1918; and No. 3, A major, 1926); an incomplete fourth symphony was lost when the composer was robbed in Paris—see Category of Madetoja symphonies
- Ernest Pingoud (1887–1942), Finnish composer of 3 symphonies (1920; 1921; and 1927)
- Florence Price (1887–1953), American composer of 4 symphonies, the second of which (c. 1935) is lost; her first (1932) is recognized as the first symphony by an African-American female composer
- Yuri Shaporin (1887–1966), Russian composer of 2 symphonies
- Heinz Tiessen (1887–1971), German composer of 2 symphonies
- Ernst Toch (1887–1964), Austrian composer of 7 symphonies
- Max Trapp (1887–1971), German composer of 7 symphonies
- Fartein Valen (1887–1952), Norwegian composer of 5 symphonies
- Heitor Villa-Lobos (1887–1959), Brazilian composer of 12 symphonies, the fifth of which is lost. The third is for orchestra, brass band, and (optional) mixed chorus; similarly, the fourth is for orchestra, wind band, and concertino ensemble. Finally, the tenth is a 'symphony-oratorio' that includes mixed chorus and parts for tenor, baritone, and bass soloists—see Category of Villa-Lobos symphonies. In addition, the composer left two sinfonietta (1916 and 1947, respectively).
- Anatoly Alexandrov (1888–1982), Russian composer of 2 symphonies
- Emil Bohnke (1888–1928), German violist and composer of 1 symphony
- Max Butting (1888–1976), German composer of 10 symphonies (the first for 16 instruments), plus a chamber symphony and 2 sinfoniettas (the first with banjo)
- Philip Greeley Clapp (1888–1954), American composer of 12 symphonies
- Luis Cluzeau Mortet (1888–1957), Uruguayan composer of 1 symphony
- Piero Coppola (1888–1971), Italian conductor and composer of 1 symphony
- Ilse Fromm-Michaels (1888–1986), German composer of 1 symphony
- Victor Kolar (1888–1957), Hungarian–American composer of 1 symphony
- Matthijs Vermeulen (1888–1967), Dutch composer of 7 symphonies
- Cecil Armstrong Gibbs (1889–1960), English composer of 3 symphonies
- Ina Boyle (1889–1967), Irish composer of 3 symphonies (1927, 1930, 1951)
- Rudolf Mauersberger (1889–1971), German composer of 1 symphony
- Vilém Petrželka (1889–1967), Czech composer of 4 symphonies and 2 sinfoniettas
- Levko Revutsky (1889–1977), Ukrainian composer of 2 symphonies
- Francisco Santiago (1889–1947), Filipino composer of "Taga-ilog", in 1938
- Vladimir Shcherbachov (1889–1952), Russian composer of 5 symphonies
- Rudolph Simonsen (1889–1947), Danish composer of 2 symphonies
- Luís de Freitas Branco (1890–1955), Portuguese composer of 4 symphonies
- Hans Gál (1890–1987), Austrian composer of 4 symphonies
- Jacques Ibert (1890–1962), French composer of 1 symphony (Symphonie marine, 1931) and 1 concertante symphony for oboe and string orchestra
- Andrés Isasi (1890–1940), Spanish composer of 2 symphonies
- Philip James (1890–1975), American composer of 2 symphonies and 1 sinfonietta
- Frank Martin (1890–1974), Swiss composer of 1 symphony plus a Petite symphonie concertante for harp, harpsichord, piano and string orchestra
- Bohuslav Martinů (1890–1959), Czech composer of 6 symphonies—see Category of Martinů symphonies.
- Antoni Massana (1890–1966), Catalan composer of 1 symphony
- Gösta Nystroem (1890–1966), Swedish composer of 6 symphonies: Sinfonia breve (1931); Sinfonia expressiva (1935–37); Sinfonia del mare (Symphony of the Sea), for soprano and orchestra (1948); Sinfonia Shakespeariana (1952); Sinfonia seria (1963); and Sinfonia tramontana (1965); also symphonic is the Sinfonia concertante, for cello and orchestra (1944, r. 1952)
- Wilhelm Petersen (1890–1957), German composer of 5 symphonies plus a sinfonietta for strings
- Arthur Bliss (1891–1975), English composer of A Colour Symphony (1922) and the choral work Morning Heroes (1930), described as a "symphony for orator, chorus and orchestra".
- Adolf Busch (1891–1952), German–Swiss violinist and composer of 1 symphony
- Fidelio F. Finke (1891–1968), Czech–German composer of 1 symphony (Pan, 1919)
- Frederick Jacobi (1891–1952), American composer of 2 symphonies
- Karel Boleslav Jirák (1891–1972), Czech composer of 6 symphonies
- Mihail Jora (1891–1971), Romanian composer of 1 symphony
- Georges Migot (1891–1976), French composer of 13 symphonies plus a Petite symphonie for strings
- Sergei Prokofiev (1891–1953), Russian composer of 7 symphonies, of which the fourth (Op. 47, 1929; revised as Op. 112, 1947) exists in two versions; plans to revise his second (Op. 40, 1924–25) went unrealized. In addition, two youth symphonies precede the numbered symphonies—see Category of Prokofiev symphonies. Also symphonic is the Symphony-Concerto for Cello and Orchestra in E minor, Op. 125 (1950–52) and the Sinfonietta in A major, Op. 5 (1909; later revised as Op. 48, 1929).
- Väinö Raitio (1891–1945), Finnish composer of a Symphony in G minor (1919)
- Hendrik Andriessen (1892–1981), Dutch composer of 4 numbered symphonies and a Symphonia Concertante
- Johanna Bordewijk-Roepman (1892–1971), Dutch composer of 1 symphony
- Ettore Desderi (1892–1974), Italian composer of 1 symphony (Sinfonia davidica for soprano and baritone soloists, choir and orchestra)
- Giorgio Federico Ghedini (1892–1965), Italian composer of 1 symphony (Symphonia, posthumous work)
- Ferde Grofé (1892–1972), American composer of 15 symphonies
- Arthur Honegger (1892–1955), Swiss-French composer of 5 symphonies—see Category of Honegger symphonies.
- Philipp Jarnach (1892–1982), German composer of a Sinfonia brevis
- Jaroslav Kvapil (1892–1958), Czech composer of 4 symphonies
- László Lajtha (1892–1963), Hungarian composer of 9 symphonies and 2 sinfoniettas
- Arthur Lourié (1892–1966), Russian–American composer of 2 symphonies
- Darius Milhaud (1892–1974), French composer of 12 numbered symphonies, 6 numbered chamber symphonies, an unnumbered Symphonie pour l'univers claudélien, and a Symphonie Concertante for four instruments and orchestra—see Category of Milhaud symphonies.
- Miklós Radnai (1892–1935), Hungarian composer of 1 symphony for solo voices, chorus and orchestra (Symphony of the Magyars, 1921)
- Hilding Rosenberg (1892–1985), Swedish composer of 8 symphonies
- Kaikhosru Shapurji Sorabji (1892–1988), English composer of 12 symphonies: 7 for piano, 3 for organ, and 2 for piano, organ, chorus and large orchestra. The first of his piano symphonies ("No. 0") is the piano part of his otherwise unfinished 2nd Symphony for Orchestra.
- Jean Absil (1893–1974), Belgian composer of 5 symphonies
- Arthur Benjamin (1893–1960), Australian composer of 1 symphony (1944–45)
- Anthony Collins, English composer of 2 string symphonies (1940, 1950)
- Edric Cundell (1893–1961), English composer of the Symphony in C minor, op. 24 (1924)
- Eugene Goossens (1893–1962), British conductor and composer of 2 symphonies and a sinfonietta
- Rued Langgaard (1893–1952), Danish composer of 16 symphonies, many of which he later revised. The third (La Melodia, 1915–16, r. 1925–33) is essentially a concertante work for piano and orchestra, while the fourteenth (Morgenen, 1947–48, r. 1951) includes mixed chorus; the fifteenth (Sørstormen, 1937, r. 1949) is for baritone soloist and male chorus.
- Aarre Merikanto (1893–1958), Finnish composer of 3 symphonies (B minor, 1916; A major, War Symphony, 1918; and 1953)
- Douglas Moore (1893–1969), American composer of 2 symphonies
- Manuel Palau (1893–1967), Spanish composer of 3 symphonies
- Bernard Rogers (1893–1968), American composer of 5 symphonies
- Marcel Tyberg (1893–1944), Austrian composer of 3 symphonies
- Ivan Wyschnegradsky (1893–1979), Russian–French composer of 2 symphonies (Ainsi parlait Zarathoustra for 4 pianos in quarter tones and Symphonie en un mouvement)
- Mihail Andricu (1894–1974), Romanian composer of 11 symphonies and 13 sinfoniettas
- Robert Russell Bennett (1894–1981), American composer of 7 symphonies
- Pavel Bořkovec (1894–1972), Czech composer of 3 symphonies
- Paul Dessau (1894–1979), German composer of 2 symphonies
- Ludvig Irgens-Jensen (1894–1969), Norwegian composer of 1 symphony
- Ernest John Moeran (1894–1950), British composer of 1 complete symphony, in G minor (1937), and a Sinfonietta; the composer also began, but failed to complete, a second symphony, in E♭ major (1947–50; elaborated in 2011 by Martin Yates).
- Willem Pijper (1894–1947), Dutch composer of 3 symphonies
- Walter Piston (1894–1976), American composer of 8 symphonies and a sinfonietta—see Category of Piston symphonies.
- Erwin Schulhoff (1894–1942), Czech composer of 8 symphonies (the last 2 in short score)
- Mark Wessel (1894–1973), American composer of 1 symphony and a Symphony Concertante for piano and horn with orchestra
- Jenő Zádor (1894–1977), Hungarian–American composer of 4 symphonies
- August Baeyens (1895–1966), Belgian composer of 8 symphonies plus 1 chamber symphony and a Sinfonia breve for small orchestra
- Bjarne Brustad (1895–1978), Norwegian composer of 9 symphonies
- Juan José Castro (1895–1968), Argentine composer of five symphonies
- Georges Dandelot (1895–1975), French composer of 1 symphony
- Johann Nepomuk David (1895–1977), Austrian composer of 8 symphonies, plus a Sinfonia preclassica, a Sinfonia breve for small orchestra and a symphony for strings
- Paul Hindemith (1895–1963), German composer of at least eight works with descriptive titles designated symphonies or sinfoniettas. In chronological order these are the Lustige Sinfonietta of 1916, the Symphony: Mathis der Maler of 1931 (the best known of Hindemith's Symphonies), the Symphony in E♭ of 1939, the Symphonia Serena of 1946, the Sinfonietta in E of 1949, Die Harmonie der Welt Symphony and the Symphony in B♭ for Concert Band (both 1951) and the Pittsburgh Symphony of 1958.
- Paul Höffer (1895–1949), German composer of 1 symphony (Sinfonie der grossen Stadt, 1937)
- Gordon Jacob (1895–1984), British composer of two numbered symphonies, a Symphony AD 78 for band, A Little Symphony, Sinfonia Brevis, and a Symphony for Strings
- Wilhelm Kempff (1895–1991), German pianist and composer of 2 symphonies
- Borys Lyatoshynsky (1895–1968), Ukrainian composer of 5 symphonies
- Henri Martelli (1895–1980), French composer of 3 symphonies
- Slavko Osterc (1895–1941), Slovenian composer of 1 symphony
- Karol Rathaus (1895–1954), Austrian–American composer of 3 symphonies
- Kazimierz Sikorski (1895–1986), Polish composer of 4 symphonies
- Leo Sowerby (1895–1968), American composer of 5 numbered orchestral symphonies, as well as a Symphony in G and Sinfonia brevis for organ
- William Grant Still (1895–1978), American composer of 5 symphonies (No. 1, Afro-American, 1930, r. 1969; No. 2, Song of a New Race, 1937; No. 3, The Sunday Symphony, 1958; No. 4, Autochthonous, 1947; and No. 5, Western Hemisphere, 1945, r. 1970)
- Walter Abendroth (1896–1973), German composer of 5 symphonies plus a sinfonietta
- František Brož (1896–1962), Czech composer of 1 symphony
- Eduard Erdmann (1896–1958), German composer of 4 symphonies
- Jacobo Ficher (1896–1978), Argentine composer of 10 symphonies
- Richard Flury (1896–1967), Swiss composer of 5 symphonies
- Emil Frey (1896–1946), Swiss pianist and composer of 2 symphonies
- Roberto Gerhard (1896–1970), Catalan composer, active in England, wrote 5 numbered symphonies (1952–69, the last unfinished), and a Symphony "Homenaje a Pedrell" (1940–41)
- Howard Hanson (1896–1981), American composer of 7 symphonies (No. 1 Nordic, No. 2 Romantic—his most famous, No. 4 Requiem, No. 5 Sinfonia Sacra, and No. 7 Sea Symphony)
- Jean Rivier (1896–1987), French composer of 8 symphonies, four of which are for string orchestra
- Roger Sessions (1896–1985), American composer of 9 symphonies, all but the first 2 of which are written using some form of the twelve-tone technique—see Category of Sessions symphonies.
- Bolesław Szabelski (1896–1979), Polish composer of 5 symphonies
- Virgil Thomson (1896–1989), American composer of 3 symphonies
- Wladimir Vogel (1896–1984), Russian–Swiss composer of 1 symphony (Sinfonia fugata, 1930–32)
- Paul Ben-Haim (1897–1984), German-Israeli composer of 2 symphonies
- Jørgen Bentzon (1897–1951), Danish composer of 2 symphonies
- Matija Bravničar (1897–1977), Slovenian composer of 4 symphonies
- Henry Cowell (1897–1965), American composer of 20 symphonies (a 21st exists only as sketches), as well as a Sinfonietta for chamber orchestra (1928) and an incomplete Symphonic Sketch (1943)
- Oscar Lorenzo Fernández (1897–1948), Brazilian composer of 2 symphonies
- John Fernström (1897–1961), Swedish composer of 12 symphonies
- Ottmar Gerster (1897–1969), German composer of 4 symphonies
- Hermann Heiss (1897–1966), German composer of 2 symphonies (Sinfonia giocosa and Sinfonia atematica)
- Erich Wolfgang Korngold (1897–1957), Austrian-American composer of 1 symphony
- György Kósa (1897–1984), Hungarian composer of 9 symphonies
- Francisco Mignone (1897–1986), Brazilian composer of 3 orchestral symphonies and a chamber work titled Four Symphonies, for oboe, clarinet, and bassoon
- Quincy Porter (1897–1966), American composer of 2 symphonies (1934; and 1962)
- Jaroslav Řídký (1897–1956), Czech composer of 7 symphonies and 2 sinfoniettas
- Knudåge Riisager (1897–1974), Danish composer of 5 symphonies
- Harald Sæverud (1897–1992), Norwegian composer of 9 symphonies
- Alexandre Tansman (1897–1986), Polish composer of 9 symphonies
- Ernst Bacon (1898–1990), American composer of 4 symphonies
- Emmanuel Bondeville (1898–1987), French composer of 2 symphonies
- Marcel Delannoy (1898–1962), French composer of 2 symphonies
- Norman Demuth (1898–1968), English composer of 1 symphony for string orchestra
- Hanns Eisler (1898–1962), German composer of a Little Symphony (1932), a Chamber Symphony (1940) and a German Symphony for choir and orchestra (1930–1958)
- Herbert Elwell (1898–1974), American composer of a Blue Symphony for soprano and string quartet
- Roy Harris (1898–1979), American composer of 15 symphonies, of which Symphony No. 3 is by far the most famous
- Tibor Harsányi (1898–1954), Hungarian–French composer of 1 symphony
- Lev Knipper (1898–1974), Russian composer of 21 symphonies and 2 sinfoniettas
- Marcel Mihalovici (1898–1985), Romanian–French composer of 5 symphonies
- Karl Rankl (1898–1968), Austrian–British conductor and composer of 8 symphonies and 2 sinfoniettas
- Vittorio Rieti (1898–1994), Italian–American composer of 11 symphonies
- Mischa Spoliansky (1898–1985), Russian-born composer of the Symphony in Five Movements (1941–1969)
- Viktor Ullmann (1898–1944), Czech composer of 2 symphonies (1944, both are reconstructions from the short score of the Piano Sonatas No. 5 and Piano Sonatas No. 7 by Bernard Wulff)
- William Baines (1899–1922), English composer of the Symphony in C minor (1917, not performed until 1991)
- Radie Britain (1899–1994), American composer of 2 symphonies
- Carlos Chávez (1899–1978), Mexican composer of 6 symphonies, as well as a "Dance Symphony" Caballos de vapor (AKA Horse Power), and a Sinfonía proletaria (proletarian symphony)—see Category of Chávez symphonies.
- Sophie Carmen Eckhardt-Gramatté (1899–1974), Canadian composer of 2 symphonies and a Symphony-Concerto for piano and orchestra
- William Levi Dawson (1899–1990), American composer of the "Negro Folk Symphony" (1934, r. 1952)
- Christopher Edmunds (1899–1990), English composer of 3 symphonies
- Pavel Haas (1899–1944), Czech composer of an unfinished Symphony (1940/41, orchestration completed by Zdenek Zouhar)
- Eduardo Hernández Moncada (1899–1995), Mexican composer of 2 symphonies
- Finn Høffding (1899–1997), Danish composer of 4 symphonies
- Jón Leifs (1899–1968), Icelandic composer of 1 programmatic symphony, called Sögusinfónía (Saga Symphony)
- Harl McDonald (1899–1955), American pianist, conductor, and composer of 4 symphonies
- Alexander Tcherepnin (1899–1977), Russian composer of 4 symphonies
- Randall Thompson (1899–1984), American composer of 3 symphonies
- Pancho Vladigerov (1899–1978), Bulgarian composer of 2 symphonies (the second for strings)

== 1900–1949 ==
- George Antheil (1900–1959), American composer of 10 symphonies, of which six are numbered (No. 1, Zingareska, 1920–22, r. 1923; No. 2, 1931–38, r. 1943; No. 3, American, 1936–41, r. 1946; No. 4, 1942, 1942; No. 5, Joyous, 1947–48; and No. 6, After Delacroix, 1947–48, r. 1949–50) and four are unnumbered (the Symphony for Five Instruments, 1923, r. 1923; the Jazz Symphony, for three pianos and orchestra, 1925, r. 1955; a Symphony in F major, 1925–26; and an alternative fifth symphony, Tragic Symphony, 1943–46, which Antheil composed as a requiem to the World War II dead)
- Henry Barraud (1900–1997), French composer of 3 symphonies (the second for strings) and a Symphonie concertante for trumpet and orchestra
- Nicolai Berezowsky (1900–1953), Russian–American violinist and composer of 4 symphonies
- Willy Burkhard (1900–1955), Swiss composer of 1 symphony (Piccola sinfonia giocosa for small orchestra)
- Alan Bush (1900–1995), British composer of 4 symphonies
- Aaron Copland (1900–1990), American composer of 3 numbered symphonies, a Symphony for organ and orchestra (later arranged without organ as Symphony No. 1), and a Dance Symphony for orchestra. The fourth movement of No. 3 is based on his famous Fanfare for the Common Man
- Pierre-Octave Ferroud (1900–1936), French composer of 1 symphony
- Isadore Freed (1900–1960), American composer of 2 symphonies
- Anis Fuleihan (1900–1970), Cypriot–American composer of 2 symphonies and a Concertante Symphony for string quartet and orchestra
- Uuno Klami (1900–1961), Finnish composer of 2 numbered symphonies (1938; and 1945), as well as a Symphonie enfantine (1928)
- Paul Kletzki (1900–1973), Polish conductor and composer of 3 symphonies plus a sinfonietta for strings
- Ernst Krenek (1900–1991), Austrian composer of 5 symphonies
- Colin McPhee (1900–1964), Canadian composer of 2 symphonies
- Alexander Mosolov (1900–1973), Russian composer of 8 symphonies
- Hermann Reutter (1900–1985), German composer of 1 symphony for strings plus a Hamlet–Sinfonie for soloists, narrator and orchestra
- Lucijan Marija Škerjanc (1900–1973), Slovene composer of 5 symphonies plus a sinfonietta for strings
- Carl Ueter (1900–1985), German composer of 2 symphonies
- Guy Warrack (1900–1986), Scottish composer of the Symphony in C minor (1932)
- Kurt Weill (1900–1950), German composer of 2 symphonies
- Kazimierz Wiłkomirski (1900–1995), Polish composer of 1 symphony and 1 Symphony concertante for cello and orchestra
- David Wynne (1900–1983), Welsh composer of 4 symphonies (the last incomplete)
- Karel Albert (1901–1987), Belgian composer of 4 symphonies plus 1 chamber symphony and 1 sinfonietta
- Blaž Arnič (1901–1970), Slovenian composer of 9 symphonies
- Julián Bautista (1901–1961), Spanish–Argentine composer of 1 symphony
- Conrad Beck (1901–1989), Swiss composer of 7 symphonies
- Werner Egk (1901–1983), German composer of 1 symphony (Kleine Symphonie, 1926)
- Eivind Groven (1901–1977), Norwegian composer of 2 symphonies (No. 1, Towards the Mountains, 1937, r. 1951; and No. 2, The Midnight Hour, 1943)
- Victor Hely-Hutchinson (1901–1947), British composer of 2 symphonies (1927 and 1942)
- Emil Hlobil (1901–1987), Czech composer of 7 symphonies and 1 sinfonietta
- Hanns Jelinek (1901–1969), Austrian composer of 6 symphonies
- Ernst Pepping (1901–1981), German composer of 3 symphonies
- Marcel Poot (1901–1988), Belgian composer of 7 symphonies
- Edmund Rubbra (1901–1986), English composer of 11 symphonies
- Henri Sauguet (1901–1989), French composer of 4 symphonies
- Henri Tomasi (1901–1971), French composer of 2 symphonies
- Mark Brunswick (1902–1971), American composer of 1 symphony
- Alfonso de Elías (1902–1984), Mexican composer of 3 symphonies
- Helvi Leiviskä (1902–1982), Finnish composer of 3 symphonies and a Sinfonia brevis
- Lino Liviabella (1902–1964), Italian composer of 1 symphony
- Stefan Bolesław Poradowski (1902–1967), Polish composer of 8 symphonies
- Vissarion Shebalin (1902–1963), Russian composer of 5 symphonies and 1 sinfonietta
- John Vincent (1902–1977), American composer of 2 numbered symphonies and 1 earlier symphony (lost)
- Arnold Walter (1902–1973), Austrian–Canadian composer of 1 symphony
- Sir William Walton (1902–1983), English composer of 2 symphonies
- Meredith Willson (1902–1984), American composer of 2 symphonies
- Stefan Wolpe (1902–1972), German-born composer of a Symphony (1955–56)
- Sir Lennox Berkeley (1903–1989), English composer of 4 symphonies
- Boris Blacher (1903–1975), German composer of 2 symphonies
- Vernon Duke (1903–1969), Russian–American composer of 3 symphonies
- Antiochos Evangelatos (1903–1981), Greek composer of 2 symphonies and 1 sinfonietta
- Jerzy Fitelberg (1903–1951), Polish–American composer of 2 symphonies, plus a symphony for strings and a sinfonietta
- Vittorio Giannini (1903–1966), American composer of 5 symphonies
- Pál Kadosa (1903–1983), Hungarian composer of 8 symphonies and 1 sinfonietta
- Aram Khachaturian (1903–1978), Armenian composer of 3 symphonies
- Mykola Kolessa (1903–2006), Ukrainian composer of 2 symphonies
- Saburō Moroi (1903–1977), Japanese composer of 5 symphonies
- Nicolas Nabokov (1903–1978), Russian–American composer of 3 symphonies
- Priaulx Rainier (1903–1986), South African–British composer of 1 chamber symphony for strings
- Günter Raphael (1903–1960), German composer of 5 symphonies plus a "Sinfonia breve"
- Luis Humberto Salgado (1903–1977), Ecuadorian composer of 9 symphonies
- John Antill (1904–1986), Australian composer of Symphony on a City (1959)
- Victor Bruns (1904–1996), German composer of 6 symphonies, plus 1 chamber symphony for strings and 1 sinfonietta
- Erik Chisholm (1904–1965), Scottish composer of 2 symphonies
- Hubert Clifford (1904–1959), Australian–British composer of 1 symphony
- Balys Dvarionas (1904–1972), Lithuanian composer of 1 symphony
- Géza Frid (1904–1989), Hungarian–Dutch pianist and composer of 1 symphony and 1 sinfonietta for strings
- Kunihiko Hashimoto (1904–1949), Japanese composer of 2 symphonies
- Georges Hugon (1904–1980), French composer of 3 symphonies (the last unfinished)
- Dmitry Kabalevsky (1904–1987), Russian composer of 4 symphonies
- Iša Krejčí (1904–1968), Czech composer of 4 symphonies
- Richard Mohaupt (1904–1957), German-U.S. composer of 1 symphony
- Gavriil Popov (1904–1972), Russian composer of 7 symphonies (the last unfinished)
- Cemal Reşit Rey (1904–1985), Turkish composer of 2 symphonies
- Manuel Rosenthal (1904–2003), French composer of 2 symphonies
- Reinhard Schwarz-Schilling (1904–1985), German composer of 2 symphonies
- William Alwyn (1905–1985), English composer of 5 symphonies
- Boris Arapov (1905–1992), Russian composer of 7 symphonies
- Vytautas Bacevičius (1905–1970), Lithuanian composer of 6 symphonies
- Theodor Berger (1905–1992), Austrian composer of 3 symphonies
- Marc Blitzstein (1905–1961), American composer of 1 symphony (The Airborne Symphony, 1946, for narrator, vocal soloists, male chorus and orchestra)
- Eugène Bozza (1905–1991), French composer of 5 symphonies
- Yevgeny Brusilovsky (1905–1981), Russian composer of 8 symphonies
- Francis Chagrin (1905–1972), Romanian–British composer of 2 symphonies
- Christian Darnton (1905–1981), British composer of 4 symphonies
- Ferenc Farkas (1905–2000), Hungarian composer of 1 symphony
- Karl Amadeus Hartmann (1905–1963), German composer of 8 symphonies
- André Hossein (1905–1983), Iranian–French composer of 3 symphonies
- André Jolivet (1905–1974), French composer of 3 numbered symphonies and a symphony for strings
- Jef Maes (1905–1996), Belgian composer of 3 symphonies
- Ernst Hermann Meyer (1905–1988), German composer of 3 symphonies (the first for strings) plus a concertante symphony for piano and orchestra and a sinfonietta
- Léon Orthel (1905–1985), Dutch composer of 6 symphonies
- Alan Rawsthorne (1905–1971), British composer of 3 symphonies
- Marcel Rubin (1905–1995), Austrian composer of 10 symphonies plus a sinfonietta for strings
- Verdina Shlonsky (1905–1990), Israeli composer of 1 symphony (1937)
- Sir Michael Tippett (1905–1998), English composer of 4 symphonies
- Eduard Tubin (1905–1982), Estonian composer of 11 symphonies, the last of which is incomplete. Also symphonic is the Sinfonietta on Estonian Motifs (1940).
- Dag Wirén (1905–1986), Swedish composer of 5 numbered symphonies, Nos. 2–5 of which are extant (No. 2, 1939; No. 3, 1944; No. 4, 1952; and No. 5, 1964); the composer withdrew his First Symphony (1932) and it was never performed. Also symphonic is a Sinfonietta (1934)—see Category of Wirén symphonies
- Xian Xinghai (1905–1945), Chinese composer of 2 symphonies
- Kees van Baaren (1906–1970), Dutch composer of 1 symphony (1957)
- Yves Baudrier (1906–1988), French composer of 1 symphony
- Ivan Brkanović (1906–1987), Croatian composer of 5 symphonies
- Pierre Capdevielle (1906–1969), French composer of 3 symphonies
- Arnold Cooke (1906–2005), British composer of 6 symphonies
- Paul Creston (1906–1985), American composer of 6 symphonies
- Antal Doráti (1906–1988), American conductor and composer of Hungarian birth, who wrote 2 symphonies
- Klaus Egge (1906–1979), Norwegian composer of 5 symphonies
- Will Eisenmann (1906–1992), German–Swiss composer of 1 symphony for strings
- Ulvi Cemal Erkin (1906–1972), Turkish composer of 2 symphonies plus a Sinfonietta for strings and a Symphony concertante for piano and orchestra
- Ross Lee Finney (1906–1997), American composer of 4 symphonies
- Benjamin Frankel (1906–1973), English composer of 8 symphonies
- Janis Ivanovs (1906–1983), Latvian composer of 21 symphonies
- Ingemar Liljefors (1906–1981), Swedish composer of 1 symphony
- Fernando Lopes-Graça (1906–1994), Portuguese composer of 1 symphony and 1 sinfonietta
- Peter Mieg (1906–1990), Swiss composer of 1 symphony
- Alexander Moyzes (1906–1984), Slovak composer of 12 symphonies
- Boris Papandopulo (1906–1991), Croatian composer of 2 symphonies plus a sinfonietta for strings
- Dmitri Shostakovich (1906–1975), Soviet composer of 15 symphonies, of which a number have vocal parts: the second (To October, 1927) and third (First of May, 1929) include mixed chorus; the thirteenth (Babi Yar, 1962) includes parts for bass soloist and male chorus, while the fourteenth (1969) is for soprano and bass soloists—see Category of Shostakovich symphonies. Additionally, five of Shostakovich's String Quartets were arranged (with the composer's approval) for various combinations of instruments by Rudolf Barshai and styled "Chamber Symphonies".
- Leopold Spinner (1906–1980), Austrian-born, British-domiciled composer of a Symphony for small orchestra (1932) and the Chamber Symphony (1977–1979)
- Johannes Paul Thilman (1906–1973), German composer of 7 symphonies
- David Van Vactor (1906–1994), American composer of 7 symphonies
- Grace Williams (1906–1977), Welsh composer of 2 symphonies plus a "Sinfonia Concertante"
- Konstantin Ivanov (1907–1984), Russian composer of 2 symphonies
- Tony Aubin (1907–1981), French composer of 2 symphonies
- Henk Badings (1907–1987), Dutch composer of 15 symphonies
- Günter Bialas (1907–1995), German composer of 1 symphony (Sinfonia Piccola)
- Yvonne Desportes (1907–1993), French composer of 3 symphonies
- Wolfgang Fortner (1907–1987), German composer of 1 symphony plus a Sinfonia concertante
- Camargo Guarnieri (1907–1993), Brazilian composer of 7 symphonies
- Karl Höller (1907–1987), German composer of 2 symphonies and 2 little symphonies (op. 32a and 32b, from the two piano four hands little sonatas op. 32)
- Dmitri Klebanov (1907–1987), Jewish Ukrainian composer of 9 symphonies
- Elizabeth Maconchy (1907–1994), English composer of 2 symphonies (both withdrawn) plus a symphony for double string orchestra, a sinfonietta and a Little Symphony
- Zygmunt Mycielski (1907–1987), Polish composer of 6 symphonies
- Hisato Ōsawa (1907–1953), Japanese composer of at least 3 symphonies
- Willem van Otterloo (1907–1978), Dutch conductor and composer of 1 symphony and a Symphonietta for winds
- Roman Palester (1907–1989), Polish composer of 5 symphonies plus a sinfonietta for chamber orchestra
- György Ránki (1907–1992), Hungarian composer of 2 symphonies
- Miklós Rózsa (1907–1995), Hungarian-American composer of 1 symphony
- Ahmet Adnan Saygun (1907–1991), Turkish composer of 5 symphonies
- Martin Scherber (1907–1974), German composer of 3 symphonies
- Menachem Avidom (1908–1995), Israeli composer of 10 symphonies
- Jan Zdeněk Bartoš (1908–1981), Czech composer of 7 symphonies
- Elliott Carter (1908–2012), American composer of 3 symphonies, including A Symphony of Three Orchestras (1976) and Symphonia: sum fluxae pretiam spei (1993–96)
- Jean Coulthard (1908–2000), Canadian composer of 4 symphonies
- Marin Goleminov (1908–2000), Bulgarian composer of 4 symphonies
- Kurt Hessenberg (1908–1994), German composer of 4 symphonies, plus 1 symphony and 2 sinfoniettas for strings
- Miloslav Kabeláč (1908–1979), Czech composer of 8 symphonies, including Symphony No. 8 Antiphonies.
- Herman David Koppel (1908–1998), Danish composer of 7 symphonies
- Lars-Erik Larsson (1908–1986), Swedish composer of 3 symphonies (No. 1, 1928; No. 2, 1937; and No. 3, 1945), as well as a Sinfonietta (1932)
- Jean-Yves Daniel-Lesur (1908–2002), French composer of 2 symphonies
- Nina Makarova (1908–1976), Russian composer of 1 symphony
- Franco Margola (1908–1992), Italian composer of 3 symphonies and a symphony for strings
- Olivier Messiaen (1908–1992), composer of Turangalîla-Symphonie (1946–48) in ten movements, with solo parts for piano and Ondes Martenot
- Vano Muradeli (1908–1970), Georgian composer of 2 symphonies
- Nikolai Rakov (1908–1990), Russian composer of 4 symphonies plus a sinfonietta for strings
- Halsey Stevens (1908–1989), American composer of 2 symphonies
- Geirr Tveitt (1908–1981), Norwegian composer of 2 symphonies plus a sinfonietta
- John Verrall (1908–2001), American composer of 4 symphonies
- William Wordsworth (1908–1988), English composer of 8 symphonies
- Grażyna Bacewicz (1909–1969), Polish composer of 4 numbered symphonies plus a symphony and a sinfonietta, both for strings
- Bruno Bjelinski (1909–1992), Croatian composer of 15 symphonies and 6 sinfoniettas
- Paul Constantinescu (1909–1963), Romanian composer of 2 symphonies and 1 sinfonietta
- Václav Dobiáš (1909–1978), Czech composer of 2 symphonies and 1 sinfonietta
- Erwin Dressel (1909–1972), German composer of 4 symphonies
- Norman Fulton (1909–1980), English composer of 3 symphonies (1950, 1955, 19713197)
- Harald Genzmer (1909–2007), German composer of 5 numbered symphonies, 1 chamber symphony and 3 sinfoniettas for strings plus a Sinfonia per giovani for orchestra and a Bremer Sinfonie
- Vagn Holmboe (1909–1996), Danish composer of 13 numbered symphonies, the fourth of which (Sinfonia sacra, Op. 29, 1941) includes mixed chorus. Also symphonic is the Sinfonia in memoriam (Op. 65, 1955; originally presented as Holmboe's Ninth Symphony); four sinfonie for strings (Op. 72a–d, 1957–62), which can be played together as a unified piece, Kairos; three chamber symphonies (Op. 53, 1951; Op. 100, 1968; Op. 103a, 1970); four symphonic metamorphoses (the third, Epilog, Op. 80, 1962, too was originally presented as the Ninth Symphony); and, three 'lettered' youth symphonies (mostly incomplete).
- Arwel Hughes (1909–1988), Welsh composer of 1 symphony
- Hanoch Jacoby (1909–1990), Israeli composer of 3 symphonies
- Minna Keal (1909–1999), British composer of 1 symphony
- Robin Orr (1909–2006), Scottish composer of 3 symphonies and a Sinfonietta Helvetica
- Elie Siegmeister (1909–1991), American composer of 8 symphonies
- Ādolfs Skulte (1909–2000), Latvian composer of 9 symphonies
- Samuel Barber (1910–1981), American composer of 2 symphonies
- Elsa Barraine (1910–1999), French composer of 2 symphonies
- Miguel Bernal Jiménez (1910–1956), Mexican composer of 2 symphonies (Mexico and Hidalgo)
- Ronald Binge, English composer of the Saturday Symphony (1966–1968)
- Henri Challan (1910–1977), French composer of 1 symphony
- Aloys Fleischmann (1910–1992), Irish composer of 1 symphony
- Werner Wolf Glaser (1910–2006), German–Swedish composer of 13 symphonies
- Evgeny Golubev (1910–1988), Russian composer of 7 symphonies
- Charles Jones (1910–1997), Canadian–American composer of 4 symphonies
- Erland von Koch (1910–2009), Swedish composer of 6 symphonies (No. 1, 1938; No. 2, Sinfonia Dalecarlica, 1945; No. 3, 1948; No. 4, Sinfonia seria, 1953, r. 1962; No. 5, Lapponica, 1977; and No. 6, Salva la terra, 1992); also symphonic is the Sinfonietta (1949)
- Rolf Liebermann (1910–1999), Swiss composer of 1 symphony
- Marijan Lipovšek (1910–1995), Slovenian composer of 1 symphony
- Jean Martinon (1910–1976), French conductor and composer of 4 numbered symphonies plus a sinfonietta and a Symphonie de voyages
- Alfred Mendelsohn (1910–1966), Romanian composer of 9 symphonies
- Alex North (1910–1991), American composer of 2 symphonies
- H. Owen Reed (1910–2014), American composer of 1 symphony
- Yiannis Papaioannou (1910–1989), Greek composer of 5 symphonies
- Ennio Porrino (1910–1959), Italian composer of 1 symphony
- William Schuman (1910–1992), American composer of 10 symphonies
- Robert Still (1910–1971), English composer of 4 symphonies
- Josef Tal (1910–2008), Israeli composer of 6 symphonies
- José Ardévol (1911–1981), Cuban composer of 3 symphonies
- Stanley Bate (1911–1959), English composer of 4 symphonies and 2 sinfoniettas
- Ján Cikker (1911–1989), Slovak composer of 3 symphonies and 1 sinfonietta
- Helmut Degen (1911–1995), German composer of 1 chamber symphony
- Bernard Herrmann (1911–1975), American composer of 1 symphony (1940)
- Alan Hovhaness (1911–2000), American composer of 67 symphonies
- Stefan Kisielewski (1911–1991), Polish composer of 3 symphonies (the last for 15 players)
- Gian Carlo Menotti (1911–2007), Italian–American composer of 1 symphony (The Halcyon, 1976)
- Anne-Marie Ørbeck (1911–1996), Norwegian composer of 1 symphony
- Allan Pettersson (1911–1980), Swedish composer of 17 symphonies, his No.1 and No.17 were left in a fragmentary state, being completed by Christian Lindberg
- Nino Rota (1911–1979), Italian composer of 3 symphonies and "Sinfonia sopra una Canzone d'Amore"
- Mukhtar Ashrafi (1912–1975), Uzbek composer of 2 symphonies
- Wayne Barlow (1912–1996), American composer of 1 chamber symphony
- Roger Sacheverell Coke (1912–1972), English composer of 3 symphonies
- Ingolf Dahl (1912–1970), German–American composer of 1 concertante symphony for two clarinets and orchestra and 1 sinfonietta for concert band
- Don Gillis (1912–1978), American composer of 10 symphonies, plus a "Symphony No. 5 1/2"
- Rudolf Escher (1912–1980), Dutch composer of 2 numbered symphonies, an unfinished Symphony in memoriam Maurice Ravel, and a Symphony for 10 instruments
- Jean Françaix (1912–1997), French composer of 1 symphony
- Peggy Glanville-Hicks (1912–1990), Australian composer of a Sinfonietta (1935)
- Robert Hughes (1912–2007), Scottish–Australian composer of 1 symphony and 1 sinfonietta
- Daniel Jones (1912–1993), Welsh composer of 13 symphonies and 2 sinfoniettas
- Jean-Louis Martinet (1912–2010), French composer of 1 symphony
- Tauno Marttinen (1912–2008), Finnish composer of 10 symphonies
- Xavier Montsalvatge (1912–2002), Catalan composer of "Sinfonía Mediterránea" (1948) and "Sinfonía de réquiem" (1985)
- José Pablo Moncayo (1912–1958), Mexican composer of 2 symphonies (1944 and 1958, the latter unfinished), and a Sinfonietta (1945)
- Vadim Salmanov (1912–1978), Russian composer of 4 symphonies plus a Little Symphony for strings and a Toy Symphony
- Ma Sicong (1912–1987), Chinese composer of 2 symphonies
- Bruno Bettinelli (1913–2004), Italian composer of 7 symphonies
- Henry Brant (1913–2008), American composer of 5 unnumbered symphonies
- Cesar Bresgen (1913–1988), Austrian composer of 1 symphony
- Benjamin Britten (1913–1976), British composer of several symphonies, including A Simple Symphony for strings (1933–34), Sinfonia da Requiem (1939–40), a Spring Symphony (1948–49), and the Cello Symphony (1963), as well as a Sinfonietta (1932)
- Cedric Thorpe Davie (1913–1983), Scottish composers of the Symphony in C major, In Honour of My Brother (1945)
- Norman Dello Joio (1913–2008), American composer of 1 symphony
- Alvin Etler (1913–1973), American composer of 1 symphony
- Morton Gould (1913–1996), American composer of 4 numbered symphonies (the last for band), plus 4 Symphonettes
- Hans Henkemans (1913–1995), Dutch composer of 1 symphony (1934, subsequently withdrawn)
- Tikhon Khrennikov (1913–2007), Russian composer of 3 symphonies
- René Leibowitz (1913–1972), Polish–French composer of 1 symphony and 1 chamber sinfonietta
- George Lloyd (1913–1998), English composer of 12 symphonies
- Witold Lutosławski (1913–1994), Polish composer of 4 symphonies
- Aleksandre Machavariani (1913–1995), Georgian composer of 7 symphonies
- Jerome Moross (1913–1983), American composer of 1 symphony
- Gardner Read (1913–2005), American composer of 4 symphonies
- John Weinzweig (1913–2006), Canadian composer of 1 symphony
- Walter Beckett (1914–1996), Irish composer of 1 symphony (Dublin Symphony for narrator, chorus and orchestra, 1989)
- Norman Cazden (1914–1980), American composer of 2 symphonies
- Natko Devčić (1914–1997), Croatian composer of 1 symphony
- Cecil Effinger (1914–1990), American composer of 5 numbered symphonies and 2 "Little Symphonies"
- Irving Fine (1914–1962), American composer of 1 symphony
- Roger Goeb (1914–1997), American composer of 6 symphonies and 2 "sinfonias"
- Cor de Groot (1914–1993), Dutch composer of 1 symphony
- César Guerra-Peixe (1914–1993), Brazilian composer of 2 symphonies
- Alexei Haieff (1914–1994), American composer of 3 symphonies
- Hermann Haller (1914–2002), Swiss composer of 1 symphony
- Akira Ifukube (1914–2006), Japanese composer of 1 symphony plus a Symphony Concertante for piano and orchestra
- Jan Kapr (1914–1988), Czech composer of 10 symphonies
- Dezider Kardoš (1914–1991), Slovak composer of 7 symphonies and 2 sinfoniettas
- Rafael Kubelík (1914–1996), Czech–Swiss conductor and composer of 3 symphonies
- Gail Kubik (1914–1984), American composer of 2 symphonies and a Sinfonia Concertante for piano, viola, trumpet, and orchestra
- Riccardo Malipiero (1914–2003), Italian composer of 3 symphonies
- Sir Andrzej Panufnik (1914–1991), Polish composer of 10 symphonies
- Stjepan Šulek (1914–1986), Croatian composer of 8 symphonies
- Harold Truscott (1914–1992), British composer of a Symphony in E major (1949–50), as well as a now-lost Grasmere Symphony (1938)
- David Diamond (1915–2005), American composer of 11 symphonies
- Grigory Frid (1915–2012), Russian composer of 3 symphonies
- Kurt Graunke (1915–2005), German composer of 9 symphonies
- Marcel Landowski (1915–1999), French composer of 5 symphonies
- Dorian Le Gallienne (1915–1963), Australian composer of a Symphony (1953) and a Sinfonietta (1956)
- Douglas Lilburn (1915–2001), New Zealand composer of 3 symphonies
- Robert Moffat Palmer (1915–2010), American composer of 2 symphonies
- George Perle (1915–2009), American composer of a Short Symphony (1980) and 2 sinfoniettas
- Vincent Persichetti (1915–1987), American composer of 9 symphonies
- Humphrey Searle (1915–1982), British composer of 5 symphonies
- Carlos Surinach (1915–1997), American composer of Catalan origin, he wrote 3 symphonies
- Denis ApIvor (1916–2004), British composer of 5 symphonies
- Karl-Birger Blomdahl (1916–1968), Swedish composer of 3 symphonies
- Houston Bright (1916–1970), American composer of 1 symphony
- Peter Crossley-Holland (1916–2001), British composer of 1 symphony
- Henri Dutilleux (1916–2013), French composer of 2 symphonies
- Einar Englund (1916–1999), Finnish composer of 7 symphonies
- Ellis Kohs (1916–2000), American composer of 2 symphonies
- Tolia Nikiprowetzky (1916–1997), Russian–French composer of 1 symphony and 1 sinfonietta
- Roh Ogura (1916–1990), Japanese composer of 1 symphony
- Nikolay Peyko (1916–1995), Russian composer of 10 symphonies plus a sinfonietta and a Concerto–Symphony
- Bernard Stevens (1916–1983), British composer of 2 symphonies
- Richard Arnell (1917–2009), English composer of 6 symphonies
- Anthony Burgess (1917–1993), British novelist and composer of 3 symphonies, of which only No.3 remains. He also wrote a Petite symphonie pour Strasbourg (1988), and a Sinfonietta for Liana (1990)
- Edward T. Cone (1917–2004), American composer of 1 symphony
- Roque Cordero (1917–2008), Panamanian composer of 4 symphonies
- Robert Farnon (1917–2005), Canadian composer of 3 symphonies
- John Gardner (1917–2011), English composer of 3 symphonies
- Jovdat Hajiyev (1917–2002), Azerbaijani composer of 6 symphonies
- Lou Harrison (1917–2003), American composer of 4 symphonies
- Francis Jackson (1917–2022), British composer of 1 symphony
- Ulysses Kay (1917–1995), American composer of 1 symphony and 1 sinfonietta
- Reginald Smith Brindle (1917–2003), British composer of 2 symphonies (1955 and 1989)
- Robert Ward (1917–2013), American composer of 6 symphonies
- Richard Yardumian (1917–1985), American composer of 2 symphonies
- Isang Yun (1917–1995), Korean composer of 7 symphonies
- Leonard Bernstein (1918–1990), American composer and conductor, composed 3 symphonies
- Lorne Betts (1918–1985), Canadian composer of 2 symphonies
- Harold Gramatges (1918–2008), Cuban composer of 1 symphony and a Sinfonietta
- Argeliers León (1918–1991), Cuban composer of 2 numbered symphonies, as well as an unnumbered Symphony for Strings
- A. J. Potter (1918–1980), Irish composer of 2 symphonies
- Tauno Pylkkänen (1918–1980), Finnish composer of 1 symphony and 1 sinfonietta
- George Rochberg (1918–2005), American composer of 6 symphonies
- Bernd Alois Zimmermann (1918–1970), German composer of a Sinfonia prosodica (1945), as well as a Symphony in 1 movement (1947–51/53)
- Jacob Avshalomov (1919–2013), American composer of 2 symphonies and 1 sinfonietta
- Sven-Erik Bäck (1919–1994), Swedish composer of 2 string symphonies and 1 chamber symphony
- Niels Viggo Bentzon (1919–2000), Danish composer of 24 symphonies
- Lex van Delden (1919–1988), Dutch composer of 8 symphonies
- Leif Kayser (1919–2001), Danish composer of 4 symphonies
- Tālivaldis Ķeniņš (1919–2008), Latvian-born Canadian composer of 8 symphonies
- Leon Kirchner (1919–2009), American composer of 1 symphony
- Juan Orrego-Salas (1919–2019), Chilean composer of 5 numbered symphonies, plus a Symphony in One Movement "Semper reditus" (1997)
- Cláudio Santoro (1919–1989), Brazilian composer of 14 symphonies
- Galina Ustvolskaya (1919–2006), Russian composer of 5 symphonies
- Mieczysław Weinberg (1919–1996), Polish composer who emigrated to the Soviet Union, composed 22 symphonies for full orchestra and 4 chamber symphonies. His No.22 was orchestrated by Kirill Umansky after the death of the composer.
- Alexander Arutiunian (1920–2012), Armenian composer of 2 symphonies
- Geoffrey Bush (1920–1998), British composer of 2 symphonies
- Peter Racine Fricker (1920–1990), British composer of 5 symphonies
- Karen Khachaturian (1920–2011), Armenian composer of 4 symphonies
- John La Montaine (1920–2013), American composer of 2 symphonies
- Aleksandr Lokshin (1920–1987), Russian composer of 11 symphonies plus 2 "Symphonietta"
- Ravi Shankar (1920–2012), Indian composer of 1 symphony
- Harold Shapero (1920–2013), American composer of 1 symphony
- Heikki Suolahti (1920–1936), Finnish composer of 1 symphony (Sinfonia piccola)
- Douglas Allanbrook (1921–2003), American composer of 7 symphonies
- Malcolm Arnold (1921–2006), British composer of 9 numbered symphonies, an unnumbered Symphony for Strings, Symphony for Brass, and Toy Symphony as well as three Sinfoniette.
- Jack Beeson (1921–2010), American composer of 1 symphony
- William Bergsma (1921–1994), American composer of 2 symphonies
- Andrzej Dobrowolski (1921–1990), Polish composer of 1 symphony
- Johannes Driessler (1921–1998), German composer of 3 symphonies
- Hans Ulrich Engelmann (1921–2011), German composer of 1 symphony and 1 chamber symphony
- Fritz Geißler (1921–1984), German composer, wrote 11 symphonies
- Ruth Gipps (1921–1999), British composer of 5 symphonies
- Karel Husa (1921–2016), American composer of Czech birth, composer of 2 symphonies
- Andrew Imbrie (1921–2007), American composer of 3 symphonies
- Joonas Kokkonen (1921–1996), Finnish composer of 5 symphonies (the last unfinished)
- Robert Kurka (1921–1957), American composer of 2 symphonies
- Edvard Mik'aeli Mirzoian (1921–2012), Armenian composer of 1 symphony
- Ástor Piazzolla (1921–1992), Argentine composer of a Sinfonía Buenos Aires
- Yves Ramette (1921–2012), French composer of 6 symphonies
- Alfred Reed (1921–2005), American composer and conductor of Austrian descent, composed 5 symphonies, all for wind band
- Leonard Salzedo (1921–2000), English composer of 2 symphonies and 2 sinfoniettas
- Robert Simpson (1921–1997), British composer, wrote 11 symphonies
- İlhan Usmanbaş (1921–2025), Turkish composer of 3 symphonies
- Peter Wishart (1921–1984), English composer of two symphonies (1952, 1973)
- Gerard Victory (1921–1995), Irish composer of 4 symphonies
- Irwin Bazelon (1922–1995), American composer of 9 symphonies
- Lukas Foss (1922–2009), German–American composer of 4 symphonies
- Iain Hamilton (1922–2000), Scottish composer of 4 symphonies plus a symphony for two orchestras and a sinfonia concertante for violin, viola and chamber orchestra
- Ester Mägi (1922–2021), Estonian composer of 1 symphony
- Finn Mortensen (1922–1983), Norwegian composer of 1 symphony
- Kazimierz Serocki (1922–1981), Polish composer of 2 symphonies plus a sinfonietta for 2 string orchestras
- John Veale (1922–2006), English composer of 3 symphonies
- George Walker (1922–2018), American composer of 4 symphonies
- Felix Werder (1922–2012), Australian composer of German origin, wrote 7 numbered symphonies (1943–92), a Sinfonia for viola, piano, and orchestra (1986), and a Wind Symphony (1990)
- Raymond Wilding-White (1922–2001), British–American composer of 3 numbered symphonies plus a symphony for swing orchestra and a Symphony of Symphonies
- James Wilson (1922–2005), Irish composer of 3 symphonies
- Mario Zafred (1922–1987), Italian composer of 7 symphonies and a Sinfonietta, plus a Sinfonietta breve for strings
- Zhu Jian'er (1922–2017), Chinese composer of 10 symphonies
- Arthur Butterworth (1923–2014), English composer of 7 symphonies
- Frank William Erickson (1923–1996), American composer of 3 symphonies
- Viktor Kalabis (1923–2006), Czech composer of 5 symphonies
- William Kraft (1923–2022), American composer of 1 symphony
- Peter Mennin (1923–1983), American composer, wrote 9 symphonies
- Vasilije Mokranjac (1923–1984), Serbian composer of 5 symphonies and a Sinfonietta for strings
- Daniel Pinkham (1923–2006), American composer of 4 symphonies
- Ned Rorem (1923–2022), American composer of 3 numbered orchestral symphonies, a symphony for winds and a symphony for strings
- James Stevens (1923–2012), English composer of 4 symphonies
- Lester Trimble (1923–1986), American composer of 3 symphonies
- Warren Benson (1924–2005), American composer of 2 symphonies
- Ikuma Dan (1924–2001), Japanese composer of 6 symphonies, 7th unfinished
- Heimo Erbse (1924–2005), German composer of 5 symphonies plus a Sinfonietta giocosa
- Egil Hovland (1924–2013), Norwegian composer of 3 symphonies (the third for reciter, choir and orchestra)
- Benjamin Lees (1924–2010), American composer of 5 symphonies
- Franco Mannino (1924–2005), Italian composer of 12 symphonies
- Sergiu Natra (1924–2021), Romanian–Israeli composer of 3 symphonies and 1 symphony for strings
- Serge Nigg (1924–2008), French composer of 1 symphony (Jérôme Bosch, 1960)
- Mikhaïl Nosyrev (1924–1981), Russian composer of 4 symphonies
- Else Marie Pade (1924–2016), Danish composer of 2 symphonies
- Joly Braga Santos (1924–1988), Portuguese composer of 6 symphonies
- Ernest Tomlinson (1924–2015), English composer of 2 symphonies
- Yasushi Akutagawa (1925–1989), Japanese composer of 1 numbered symphony (1954), plus a Symphony "Twin Stars", for children (1957) and the Ellora Symphony (1958)
- Jurriaan Andriessen (1925–1996), Dutch composer of 8 numbered symphonies, plus a Symphonietta concertante, for four trumpets and orchestra (1947), and a Sinfonia "Il fiume" for winds (1984)
- Mikis Theodorakis (1925–2021), Greek composer of 5 symphonies; No.1 (1953), No.2 The Song of the Earth (1981), No.3 (1981), No.7 Spring-Symphony(1983) and No.4 Of the Choral Odes (1986–1987). He also wrote a sinfonietta (1995)
- Robert Beadell (1925–1994), American composer of 2 symphonies
- Gustavo Becerra-Schmidt (1925–2010), Chilean composer of 3 symphonies
- Luciano Berio (1925–2003), Italian composer of the famous Sinfonia (1968–69)
- Aldo Clementi (1925–2011), Italian composer of 1 chamber symphony
- Marius Constant (1925–2004), Romanian–French composer of 3 symphonies (the first is scored for wind instruments)
- Georges Delerue (1925–1992), French composer of 1 concertante symphony for piano and orchestra
- Andrei Eshpai (1925–2015), Russian composer of 9 symphonies
- Bertold Hummel (1925–2002), German composer of 3 symphonies
- Giselher Klebe (1925–2009), German composer of 8 symphonies plus a Ballettsinfonie (Das Testament op. 61, 1971)
- Włodzimierz Kotoński (1925–2014), Polish composer of 2 symphonies
- Ivo Malec (1925–2019), Croatian–French composer of 1 symphony
- Kirke Mechem (born 1925), American composer of 2 symphonies
- Anthony Milner (1925–2002), British composer of 3 orchestral symphonies and a symphony for organ
- Julián Orbón (1925–1991), Spanish composer of 1 symphony
- Boris Parsadanian (1925–1997), Armenian–Estonian composer of 11 symphonies
- Gunther Schuller (1925–2015), American composer of 3 symphonies, a Symphony for Organ, and a Chamber Symphony (1989)
- Boris Tchaikovsky (1925–1996), Soviet composer of 3 symphonies and a Symphony with Harp
- Paul W. Whear (1925–2021), American composer of 4 symphonies
- Čestmír Gregor (1926–2011), Czech composer of 5 symphonies, he also wrote two sinfoniettas
- Louis Calabro (1926–1991), American composer of 3 symphonies
- Edwin Carr (1926–2003), New Zealand composer of 4 symphonies and 1 sinfonietta
- Jacques Castérède (1926–2014), French composer of 2 symphonies (the first for strings)
- Barney Childs (1926–2000), American composer of 2 symphonies
- Hans Werner Henze (1926–2012), German composer of 10 symphonies
- Ben Johnston (1926–2019), American composer of a Symphony in A (1987) and a Chamber Symphony (1990)
- François Morel (1926–2018), Canadian composer of 1 symphony for brass
- Clermont Pépin (1926–2006), Canadian composer of 5 symphonies
- Anatol Vieru (1926–1998), Romanian composer of 7 symphonies
- Paul Angerer (1927–2017), Austrian composer of 4 symphonies
- Pascal Bentoiu (1927–2016), Romanian composer of 8 symphonies
- Gunnar Bucht (born 1927), Swedish composer of 16 symphonies
- Franco Donatoni (1927–2000), Italian composer of 2 symphonies (the first for strings, the second for chamber orchestra). Another work, Souvenir (1967), is subtitled Kammersymphonie
- Donald Erb (1927–2008), American composer of a Symphony of Overtures (1964)
- Walter S. Hartley (1927–2016), American composer of 21 symphonies for different ensembles (from small wind ensembles to full orchestra) plus 2 Sinfonia concertante for wind and percussion, 2 sinfoniettas and 1 chamber symphony
- Wilfred Josephs (1927–1997), British composer of 12 symphonies
- John Joubert (1927–2019), British composer of 2 symphonies
- Wilhelm Killmayer (1927–2017), German composer of 3 symphonies
- Richard Nanes (1927–2009), American composer of 4 symphonies
- Francis Routh (1927–2021), English composer of 3 symphonies (1973, 2003, 2010–2012)
- Graham Whettam (1927–2007), English composer of 9 symphonies plus a sinfonietta for strings
- Thomas Wilson (1927–2001), Scottish composer of American birth, composed 5 symphonies between 1955 and 1998 and a Chamber Symphony (1990)
- Samuel Adler (born 1928), German-born American composer of 6 symphonies
- Tadeusz Baird (1928–1981), Polish composer of 3 symphonies (1950, 1952, 1969), a Sinfonietta (1949) and a Sinfonia Breve (1968)
- James Cohn (1928–2021), American composer of 8 symphonies
- Jean-Michel Damase (1928–2013), French composer of 1 symphony
- George Dreyfus (born 1928), Australian composer of 2 symphonies (1967 and 1976), and a Symphonie Concertante for bassoon, violin, viola, cello, and string orchestra (1978)
- Nicolas Flagello (1928–1994), American composer of 2 symphonies
- Robert Helps (1928–2001), American pianist and composer of 2 symphonies
- Guo Zurong (born 1928), Chinese composer of 33 symphonies
- Zdeněk Lukáš (1928–2007), Czech composer of 7 symphonies
- Einojuhani Rautavaara (1928–2016), Finnish composer of 8 symphonies, the first having up to 3 different versions
- William Russo (1928–2003), American composer of 2 symphonies
- Yevgeny Svetlanov (1928–2002), Russian conductor and composer of a Symphony (1956)
- Raymond Warren (1928–2025), British composer of 3 symphonies (1965, 1969, 1995)
- Carmelo Bernaola (1929–2002), Spanish composer of 3 symphonies
- Philip Cannon (1929–2016), British composer of 1 symphony and 1 sinfonietta
- Edison Denisov (1929–1996), Russian composer of 2 symphonies
- Alun Hoddinott (1929–2008), Welsh composer of 10 numbered symphonies (the first withdrawn), 3 sinfoniettas, a Sinfonia for Strings and Sinfonia Fidei for Soprano, Tenor, Chorus and Orchestra.
- Donald Keats (1929–2018), American composer of 2 symphonies
- Kenneth Leighton (1929–1988), British composer of 3 symphonies plus a "Symphony for Strings"
- Teizo Matsumura (1929–2007), Japanese composer of 2 symphonies
- Toshiro Mayuzumi (1929–1997), Japanese composer of a "Nirvana Symphony" (1958) and a "Mandala Symphony" (1960)
- Robert Muczynski (1929–2010), American composer of 2 symphonies
- Bogusław Schaeffer (1929–2019), Polish composer of 4 symphonies
- Hans Stadlmair (1929–2019), Austrian composer of a Sinfonia serena for strings
- Avet Terterian (1929–1994), Armenian composer of 9 symphonies, the last unfinished
- Akio Yashiro (1929–1976), Japanese composer of 1 symphony
- Friedrich Gulda (1930–2000), Austrian composer of a Jazz Symphony
- David Amram (born 1930), American composer of 1 symphony
- John Davison (1930–1999), American composer of 6 symphonies
- Richard Felciano (born 1930), American composer of 1 symphony for strings
- Jean Guillou (1930–2019), French composer of 3 symphonies
- Nikolai Karetnikov (1930–1994), Russian composer of 4 symphonies and 2 chamber symphonies
- Günter Kochan (1930–2009), German composer of 6 symphonies
- Dieter Schnebel (1930–2018), German composer of 1 symphony (Sinfonie X)
- Eino Tamberg (1930–2010), Estonian composer of 4 symphonies
- Gil Trythall (1930–2023), American composer of 1 symphony plus a Sinfonia concertante
- Donald Harris (1931–2016), American composer of 2 symphonies
- Anthony Hedges (1931–2019), English composer of 2 symphonies and 1 concertante symphony
- Ib Nørholm (1931–2019), Danish composer of 13 symphonies
- Malcolm Williamson (1931–2003), Australian composer of 7 numbered symphonies, as well as a Symphony for Organ (1960), a Sinfonia Concertante for three trumpets, piano and strings (1960–62), a Symphony for Voices (1962), and a Choral Symphony "The Dawn is at Hand" (1989)
- John Barnes Chance (1932–1972), American composer of 2 symphonies
- James Douglas (1932–2022), Scottish composer of 15 symphonies
- Alexander Goehr (1932–2024), British composer of German birth, wrote Little Symphony (1963), Symphony in One Movement (1969/81), a Sinfonia for chamber orchestra (1979), and Symphony with Chaconne (1985–86)
- Pelle Gudmundsen-Holmgreen (1932–2016), Danish composer of 1 symphony Symfoni, Antifoni (1977)
- John Kinsella (1932–2021), Irish composer of 11 symphonies
- Henri Lazarof (1932–2013), Bulgarian composer of 7 symphonies
- Malcolm Lipkin (1932–2017), English composer of 3 symphonies
- Martin Mailman (1932–2000), American composer of 3 symphonies and 1 sinfonietta
- Richard Meale (1932–2009), Australian composer of 1 symphony (1994)
- Per Nørgård (1932–2025), Danish composer of 8 symphonies
- Rodion Shchedrin (1932–2025), Russian composer of 3 symphonies
- Robert Sherlaw Johnson (1932–2000), British composer of 1 symphony
- Sergei Slonimsky (1932–2020), Russian composer of 34 symphonies
- Claude Thomas Smith (1932–1987), American composer of 1 symphony
- Alan Stout (1932–2018), American composer of 4 symphonies
- John Williams (born 1932), American composer and conductor. He wrote a "Symphony" (1966) and a "Sinfonietta for Wind Ensemble" (1968)
- Hugh Wood (1932–2021), British composer of 1 symphony (1982)
- Iosif Andriasov (1933–2000), Armenian-Russian composer of 2 symphonies
- Leonardo Balada (born 1933), American composer of Spanish birth, has written 6 symphonies
- Easley Blackwood (1933–2023), American composer of 5 symphonies
- Seóirse Bodley (1933–2023), Irish composer of 5 symphonies and a Chamber Symphony
- Gloria Coates (1933–2023), American composer of 16 symphonies
- Ramiro Cortés (1933–1984), American composer of a Sinfonia Sacra (1954/59)
- David Ellis (1933–2023), English composer of 3 symphonies
- Pozzi Escot (born 1933), American composer of 6 symphonies
- Henryk Górecki (1933–2010), Polish composer of 4 symphonies
- Toshi Ichiyanagi (1933–2022), Japanese composer of 6 symphonies and 2 chamber symphonies
- W. Francis McBeth (1933–2012), American composer of 4 symphonies
- Krzysztof Penderecki (1933–2020), Polish composer of 8 symphonies
- Vladimir Dashkevich (born 1934), Russian composer of 5 symphonies
- Anthony Gilbert (1934–2023), British composer of 1 symphony (1973)
- Alemdar Karamanov (1934–2007), Ukrainian composer of 24 symphonies
- William Mathias (1934–1992), Welsh composer of 3 symphonies
- Siegfried Matthus (1934–2021), German composer of 3 symphonies
- Sir Peter Maxwell Davies (1934–2016), British Composer of a Sinfonia (1962), a Sinfonia Concertante (1982), a Sinfonietta (1983) and 10 numbered symphonies (1976–2013), the last of which includes a chorus and baritone soloist
- Claudio Prieto (1934–2015), Spanish composer of 4 symphonies
- Bernard Rands (born 1934), British–American composer of 1 symphony
- Alan Ridout (1934–1996), British composer of 8 symphonies and 1 sinfonietta
- Alfred Schnittke (1934–1998), Russian composer of 10 symphonies (including symphony No."0"). No.9 was left unfinished and completed by Alexander Raskatov
- Richard Wernick (1934–2025), American composer of 2 symphonies
- Nigel Butterley (1935–2022), Australian composer of 1 symphony (1980)
- Jerry Amper Dadap (born 1935), Filipino composer of 5 symphonies
- Samuel Jones (born 1935), American composer of 3 symphonies
- Giya Kancheli (1935–2019), Georgian composer of 7 symphonies
- Carlo Martelli (born 1935), English composer of 2 symphonies (No. 1 lost)
- Nicholas Maw (1935–2009), British composer of 1 symphony for chamber orchestra
- Arvo Pärt (born 1935), Estonian composer of 4 symphonies
- Aulis Sallinen (born 1935), Finnish composer of 8 symphonies
- Kurt Schwertsik (born 1935), Austrian composer of 3 symphonies
- Josep Soler i Sardà (1935–2022), Spanish composer of 8 symphonies
- David Blake (born 1936), English composer of 1 chamber symphony
- Iván Erőd (1936–2019), Hungarian–Austrian pianist and composer of 2 symphonies
- Vyacheslav Ovchinnikov (1936–2019), Russian composer of 4 symphonies
- Richard Rodney Bennett (1936–2012), English composer of 3 symphonies and a sinfonietta
- Erich Urbanner (born 1936), Austrian composer of 1 symphony plus a concertante symphony and a sinfonietta (both for chamber orchestra)
- John White (1936–2024), English composer of 26 symphonies, none of them for conventional forces
- Osvaldas Balakauskas (1937–2026), Lithuanian composer of 5 symphonies
- David Bedford (1937–2011), English composer of 2 symphonies plus a Symphony for 12 musicians
- Gordon Crosse (1937–2021), English composer of 2 symphonies
- Philip Glass (born 1937), American composer of 15 symphonies (as of 2026)
- Milcho Leviev (1937–2019), Bulgarian composer of 1 symphony
- Valentyn Silvestrov (born 1937), Ukrainian composer of 7 symphonies
- Loris Tjeknavorian (born 1937), Iranian-Armenian conductor and composer of 5 symphonies
- Wang Xilin (born 1937), Chinese composer of at 7 symphonies
- Elizabeth R. Austin (born 1938), American composer of 2 symphonies
- Howard Blake (born 1938), English composer of 2 symphonies
- William Bolcom (born 1938), American pianist and composer of 6 symphonies
- Youri Boutsko (1938–2015), Russian composer of 13 symphonies
- John Corigliano (born 1938), American composer of 3 symphonies
- John Harbison (born 1938), American composer of 6 symphonies
- Paavo Heininen (1938–2022), Finnish composer of 6 symphonies
- Frederic Rzewski (1938–2021), American composer of a Scratch Symphony (1997)
- José Serebrier (born 1938), Uruguayan composer of 3 symphonies
- Christopher Steel (1938–1991), British composer of 7 symphonies
- Charles Wuorinen (1938–2020), American composer of 8 numbered symphonies and a Microsymphony (1992)
- Louis Andriessen (1939–2021), Dutch composer of De negen symfonieën van Beethoven, for orchestra and ice-cream vendor's bell (1970), Symfonieën der Nederlanden, for two or more wind bands (1974), and Symphony for Open Strings for 12 solo strings (1978)
- Trevor Hold (1939–2004), English composer of 2 symphonies (1974–77 and 1993–5)
- Robert Jager (born 1939), American composer of 2 symphonies and a sinfonietta
- Jaroslav Krček (born 1939), Czech composer of 6 symphonies
- Robert Matthew-Walker (born 1939), English composer of 8 symphonies and 1 sinfonietta
- John McCabe (1939–2015), English composer of 5 numbered symphonies, plus a Six-minute Symphony for strings
- Patric Standford (1939–2014), English composer of 5 symphonies
- Tomáš Svoboda (1939–2022), Czech-American composer of 6 symphonies
- Boris Tishchenko (1939–2010), Russian composer of 7 symphonies plus a "French Symphony", "Sinfonia Robusta", the Choreo-symphonic cycle of "Beatrice" (5 symphonies), and a "Pushkin Symphony"
- Margaret Lucy Wilkins (born 1939), English composer of 1 symphony
- Ellen Taaffe Zwilich (born 1939), American composer of 5 symphonies
- Alireza Mashayekhi (born 1940), Iranian composer of 9 symphonies
- Tilo Medek (1940–2006), German composer of 3 symphonies
- Pyarelal Ramprasad Sharma (Born 1940), Indian Composer Of 1 Symphony (‘Om Shivam’ #1 & #2)
- Stephen Albert (1941–1992), American composer of 2 symphonies (the second with orchestration completed by Sebastian Currier)
- Judith Margaret Bailey (1941–2025), English composer of 2 symphonies
- Derek Bourgeois (1941–2017), British composer of 116 symphonies
- Sebastian Forbes (born 1941), British composer of 1 symphony
- Friedrich Goldmann (1941–2009), German composer of 4 numbered symphonies and 4 unnumbered symphonies plus a sinfonietta and Quasi una sinfonia
- Adolphus Hailstork (born 1941), American composer of 3 symphonies
- John Melby (born 1941), American composer of 2 symphonies
- Gillian Whitehead (born 1941), New Zealand–born Australian composer of 1 symphony
- Richard Edward Wilson (born 1941), American composer of 3 symphonies
- Philip Bračanin (born 1942), Australian composer of 6 symphonies
- Volker David Kirchner (1942–2020), German composer of 2 symphonies
- Tomás Marco (born 1942), Spanish composer of 9 symphonies
- Philip Spratley (born 1942), English composer of 3 symphonies
- Edward Cowie (born 1943), English composer of 2 symphonies
- Ross Edwards (born 1943), Australian composer of 4 symphonies
- Robin Holloway (born 1943), English composer of 2 symphony (the first, Clarissa Symphony, for soprano, tenor and orchestra)
- Shin'ichirō Ikebe (born 1943), Japanese composer of 7 symphonies
- Ilaiyaraaja (born 1943), Indian composer of 1 symphony
- David Maslanka (1943–2017), American composer of 10 symphonies
- David Matthews (born 1943), English composer of 11 symphonies
- Krzysztof Meyer (born 1943), Polish composer of 9 symphonies plus an unnumbered Symphony in Mozartean style
- Joseph Schwantner (born 1943), American composer of 1 symphony
- Roger Smalley (1943–2015), English composer of 1 symphony (1979–81)
- William Albright (1944–1998), American composer of a Symphony for Organ and Percussion
- Frank Corcoran (born 1944), Irish composer of 4 symphonies
- Michael Garrett (1944–2023), British composer of 13 symphonies and 13 concertante symphonies
- Christopher Gunning (1944–2023), British composer of 13 symphonies
- Pehr Henrik Nordgren (1944–2008), Finnish composer of 8 symphonies plus a symphony for strings and a chamber symphony
- Rhian Samuel (born 1944), Welsh composer of an "Elegy-Symphony"
- Leif Segerstam (1944–2024), Finnish composer of 354 symphonies, the all-time record as of 2015
- Jerome de Bromhead (born 1945), Irish composer of 2 symphonies
- Gerd Domhardt (1945–1997), German composer of 2 symphonies and 2 chamber symphonies
- Edward Gregson (born 1945), English composer of 1 symphony for brass band
- Judith Lang Zaimont (born 1945), American composer of 2 numbered symphonies, plus a "dance symphony" titled Hidden Heritage and a Symphony for wind orchestra in three scenes (2003)
- Thomas Pasatieri (born 1945), American composer of 3 symphonies
- Arnold Rosner (1945–2013), American composer of 6 symphonies
- Alexey Rybnikov (born 1945), Russian composer of 6 symphonies
- Ragnar Søderlind (born 1945), Norwegian composer of 8 symphonies
- Martin Bresnick (born 1946), American composer of 1 symphony
- Tsippi Fleischer (born 1946), Israeli composer of 5 symphonies
- Tristan Keuris (1946–1996), Dutch composer of a "Sinfonia" (1972–1974), and "Symphony in D" (1995)
- Ladislav Kubík (1946–2017), Czech-American composer of 3 sinfoniettas
- Ulrich Leyendecker (1946–2018), German composer of 5 symphonies
- Richard St. Clair (born 1946), American composer of 1 symphony
- Giles Swayne (born 1946), British composer of 2 symphonies
- Pēteris Vasks (born 1946), Latvian composer of 3 symphonies
- Heinz Winbeck (1946–2019), German composer of 5 symphonies, the first premiered in 1984, the fifth in 2010, the third including text of Georg Trakl for alto and speaker
- John Adams (born 1947), American composer who has used the term 'Symphony' to describe a number of works, including the Chamber Symphony (1992) and its sequel Son of Chamber Symphony (2007), the Dr. Atomic Symphony (2007), drawn from his opera of the same name, and Scheherazade.2, a "dramatic symphony" for violin and orchestra.
- Jack Gallagher (born 1947), American composer of 2 symphonies and 1 sinfonietta
- Nikolai Korndorf (1947–2001), Russian–Canadian composer of 4 symphonies
- Paul Patterson (born 1947), British composer of 1 symphony for strings
- Emil Tabakov (born 1947), Bulgarian composer of 10 symphonies
- Claude Baker (born 1948), American composer of 1 symphony
- Ioseb Bardanashvili (born 1948), Georgian–Israeli composer of 3 symphonies
- Glenn Branca (1948–2018), American composer and guitarist, who composed 12 symphonies, 9 of them for ensembles of electric guitars and percussion
- Stephen Brown (born 1948), Canadian composer of 3 symphonies: The Northern Journey (1986–2019), Fear and Loathing (2019), Combustion (2020)
- Diana Burrell (born 1948), English composer of 1 symphony (Symphonies of Flocks, Herds and Shoals, 1995–96)
- Carlos Franzetti (born 1948), Argentinian composer of 2 symphonies
- Mikko Heiniö (born 1948), Finnish composer of 2 symphonies
- Jonathan Lloyd (born 1948), British composer of 5 symphonies
- Edward McGuire (born 1948), Scottish composer of 3 symphonies
- Julia Tsenova (1948–2010), Bulgarian composer of Sinfonia con piano concertante (1974)
- Dan Welcher (born 1948), American conductor and composer of 5 symphonies
- Kalevi Aho (born 1949), Finnish composer of 18 symphonies and 3 chamber symphonies
- James Barnes (born 1949), American composer of 5 symphonies
- Hiro Fujikake (born 1949), Japanese composer of 3 symphonies
- Eduard Hayrapetyan (born 1949), Armenian composer of 3 symphonies
- Richard Mills (born 1949), Australian composer of 2 symphonies
- Stephen Paulus (1949–2014), American composer of 2 symphonies (the second for strings) and 2 sinfoniettas
- Shulamit Ran (born 1949), Israeli–American composer of 1 symphony
- Christopher Rouse (1949–2019), American composer of 6 symphonies
- Poul Ruders (born 1949), Danish composer of 5 symphonies
- Manfred Trojahn (born 1949), German composer of 5 symphonies

== 1950–present ==
- Andrew Downes (1950-2023), British composer of 5 symphonies
- Otomar Kvěch (1950–2018), Czech composer of 5 symphonies
- Libby Larsen (born 1950), American composer of 7 symphonies
- Stephen Oliver (1950–1992), English composer of 1 symphony
- Jay Reise (born 1950), American composer of 3 symphonies
- Lepo Sumera (1950–2000), Estonian composer of 6 symphonies and 1 symphony for string orchestra and percussion
- Alan Belkin (born 1951), Canadian composer of 8 symphonies
- John Buckley (born 1951), Irish composer of 1 symphony
- Ronald Corp (1951–2025), English composer of 1 symphony (2009)
- Gareth Glyn (born 1951), Welsh composer of 1 symphony
- Brian M. Israel (1951–1986), American composer of 6 symphonies
- Anthony Korf (born 1951), American composer of 3 symphonies
- Gerald Levinson (born 1951), American composer of 2 symphonies
- Michael Rosenzweig (born 1951), South African composer of 1 symphony and 2 sinfoniettas
- Craig H. Russell (born 1951), American composer of 2 symphonies
- Philip Sawyers (born 1951), British composer of 6 symphonies
- Roger Briggs (born 1952), American composer of 2 symphonies
- Alexander Brincken (born 1952), Russian composer of 5 symphonies
- Brenton Broadstock (born 1952), Australian composer of 5 symphonies
- Stephen Hartke (born 1952), American composer of 4 symphonies
- Oliver Knussen (1952–2018), English conductor and composer of 3 symphonies
- Alla Pavlova (born 1952), Russian composer of 11 symphonies
- Wolfgang Rihm (1952–2024), German composer of 3 numbered and 2 unnumbered symphonies
- Cindy McTee (born in 1953), American composer of 1 symphony
- Daniel Asia (born 1953), American composer of 6 symphonies
- Johan de Meij (born 1953), Dutch composer of 4 symphonies
- Akira Nishimura (1953–2023), Japanese composer of 3 symphonies and 3 chamber symphonies
- Anthony Powers (born 1953), British composer of 2 symphonies
- Robert Saxton (born 1953), British composer of 1 chamber symphony
- Wolfgang von Schweinitz (born 1953), German composer of 2 symphonies plus a Plainsound–Sinfonie for basset clarinet, ensemble and orchestra
- Roberto Sierra (born 1953), Puerto Rican composer of 7 symphonies
- Takashi Yoshimatsu (born 1953), Japanese composer of 6 symphonies
- Chen Yi (born 1953), Chinese composer of 3 symphonies
- Elisabetta Brusa (born 1954), Italian composer of 2 symphonies
- Daniel Bukvich (born 1954), American composer of 2 symphonies
- Robert Carl (born 1954), American composer of 3 symphonies
- Michael Daugherty (born 1954), American composer of a Metropolis Symphony (1988–93)
- Eric Ewazen (born 1954), American composer of 1 symphony for strings and 1 chamber symphony
- Anders Nilsson (born 1954), Swedish composer of 3 symphonies
- Tobias Picker (born 1954), American composer of 3 symphonies
- Adam Pounds (born 1954), British composer of 4 symphonies
- Sergio Rendine (1954–2023), Italian composer of 2 symphonies
- Sinan Savaskan (born 1954), British composer of 4 symphonies
- Carl Vine (born 1954), Australian composer of 8 symphonies
- Ye Xiaogang (born 1955), Chinese composer of 1 symphony
- Nigel Keay (born 1955), New Zealand composer of 1 symphony
- Dieter Lehnhoff (born 1955), German-Guatemalan composer of 2 symphonies
- Behzad Ranjbaran (born 1955), Persian–American composer of 1 symphony
- Sally Beamish (born 1956), British composer of 2 symphonies
- Richard Danielpour (born 1956), American composer of 3 symphonies
- Jouni Kaipainen (1956–2015), Finnish composer of 4 symphonies
- Onutė Narbutaitė (born 1956), Lithuanian composer of 4 symphonies
- Thomas Sleeper (1956–2022), American composer of 5 symphonies
- Guan Xia (born 1957), Chinese composer of 2 symphonies
- Miguel del Águila (born 1957), Uruguayan-American composer 2 programmatic Symphonies
- Mark Alburger (1957-2023), American composer of 9 symphonies
- Keith Burstein (born 1957), English composer of 1 symphony and 1 chamber symphony
- Tan Dun (born 1957), Chinese composer of 1 symphony
- Andrew Hugill (born 1957), British composer of 2 symphonies
- Bechara El Khoury (born 1957), Lebanese-born French composer of 1 symphony
- Gerhard Schedl (1957–2000), Austrian composer of 4 symphonies
- Frank Ticheli (born 1958), American composer of 2 symphonies
- Patrick Hawes (born 1958), British composer of 1 symphony
- John Abram (born 1959), Anglo-Canadian composer of 1 chamber symphony
- Luc Brewaeys (1959–2015), Belgian composer of 8 symphonies (the last was unfinished)
- Alejandro Civilotti (born 1959), Argentine composer of 5 symphonies
- Matthew Curtis (born 1959), British composer of 1 symphony
- Paul Desenne (1959–2023), Venezuelan composer of 5 symphonies
- Shigeru Kan-no (born 1959), Japanese composer of 7 chamber symphonies
- James MacMillan (born 1959), Scottish composer of 5 symphonies and 1 sinfonietta
- Erkki-Sven Tüür (born 1959), Estonian composer of 9 symphonies
- Nigel Clarke (born 1960), British composer of 1 symphony
- Detlev Glanert (born 1960), German composer of 4 symphonies and 1 chamber symphony
- Kamran Ince (born 1960), American composer of 5 symphonies
- Aaron Jay Kernis (born 1960), American composer of 4 symphonies
- Anthony Ritchie (born 1960), New Zealand composer of 6 symphonies
- Peter Seabourne (born 1960), British composer of 7 symphonies
- Jesús Rueda (born 1961), Spanish composer of 16 symphonies
- Nicolas Bacri (born 1961), French composer of 7 symphonies
- Daron Hagen (born 1961), American composer of 5 symphonies
- Lowell Liebermann (born 1961), American composer of 4 symphonies, the second with chorus to texts by Walt Whitman
- Michael Torke (born 1961), American composer of 1 symphony
- Claus-Steffen Mahnkopf (born 1962), German composer of 3 chamber symphonies
- Victoria Poleva (born 1962), Ukrainian composer of 3 symphonies
- Rudi Spring (1962–2025), German composer of 3 chamber symphonies
- Timothy Brock (born 1963), American composer of 3 symphonies
- Thomas Larcher (born 1963), Austrian composer of 3 symphonies
- Sean O'Boyle (born 1963), Australian composer of 1 symphony
- John Pickard (born 1963), British composer of 6 symphonies
- David del Puerto (born 1964), Spanish composer of 2 symphonies
- Julia Gomelskaya (1964–2016), Ukrainian composer of 4 symphonies plus a Concert–Symphony for violin and orchestra and 2 chamber symphonies
- Malcolm D Robertson (born 1964), British composer of 6 symphonies
- Matthew Taylor (born 1964), English composer of 6 symphonies
- Robert Steadman (born 1965), British composer of 2 symphonies and 1 chamber symphony
- Jeffrey Ching (born 1965), Chinese-Philippine composer of 5 symphonies
- Moritz Eggert (born 1965), German composer of 2 symphonies (Symphonie 1.0 for 12 typewriters and Internet–Symphonie for orchestra)
- Thierry Pécou (born 1965), French composer of 1 symphony
- Vache Sharafyan (born 1966), Armenian composer of 2 symphonies
- Julian Anderson (born 1967), British composer of 1 symphony
- Salvatore Di Vittorio (born 1967), Italian composer of 3 symphonies
- Frederick Stocken (born 1967), British composer of 2 symphonies
- Christopher Theofanidis (born 1967), American composer of 1 symphony
- Matthew Hindson (born 1968), Australian composer of 3 symphonies
- Victoria Borisova-Ollas (born 1969), Russian-Swedish composer of 2 symphonies
- Esteban Benzecry (born 1970), Argentine composer of 3 symphonies
- Peter Boyer (born 1970), American composer of 1 symphony
- Robert Paterson (born 1970), American composer of a Symphony in Three Movements
- Fazıl Say (born 1970), Turkish composer of 4 symphonies.
- Julian Wagstaff (born 1970), Scottish composer of Symphony for Chamber Orchestra
- Thomas Adès (born 1971), British composer of 1 symphony
- Richard Causton (born 1971), composer of a chamber symphony (2009)
- Michael Hersch (born 1971), American composer of 3 symphonies
- Michael Wolters (born 1971), British composer of 1 symphony
- Jason Wright Wingate (born 1971), American composer of 2 symphonies
- Dae-Ho Eom (born 1972), South Korean composer of 4 symphonies
- Kevin Puts (born 1972), American composer of 4 symphonies
- Lera Auerbach (born 1973), Russian-American composer of 4 symphonies
- Søren Nils Eichberg (born 1973), Danish–German composer of 3 symphonies
- Jonathan Leshnoff (born 1973), American composer of 4 symphonies
- Airat Ichmouratov (born 1973), Russian/Canadian composer of Symphony in A minor
- Paul Mealor (born 1975), Welsh composer of 3 symphonies
- Huw Watkins (born 1976), Welsh composer of 2 symphonies
- Mason Bates (born 1977), American composer of 4 symphonies
- Dinesh Subasinghe (born 1979), Sri Lankan composer of 1 symphony
- Edward Manukyan (born 1981), Armenian-American composer of 1 symphony
- Joel Thomas Zimmerman (born 1981), Canadian composer of 1 symphony
- Carson Cooman (born 1982), American composer of 4 symphonies
- Mohammed Fairouz (born 1985), American composer of 4 symphonies
- Rod Schejtman (born 1985), Argentine composer of 1 symphony
- Carlos Simon (born 1986), American composer of 1 symphony
- Jay Greenberg (born 1991), American composer of 6 symphonies
- Alex Prior (born 1992), British composer of 4 symphonies
- Robin Haigh (born 1993), Irish/British composer of 1 symphony
