= Elsa Barraine =

French composer (1910–1999)

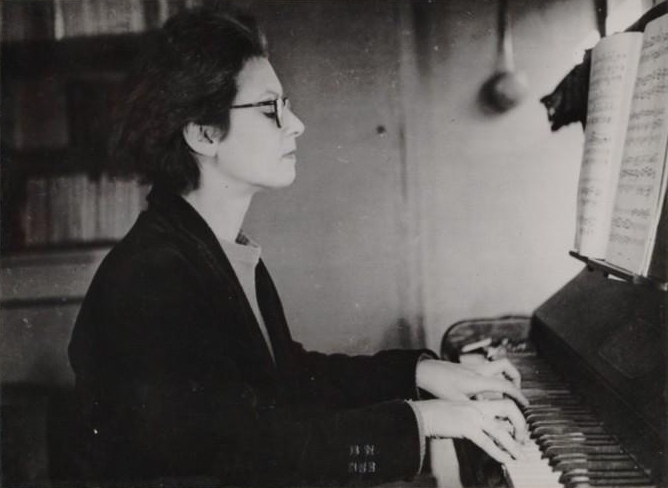
Barraine (1940)

Elsa Jacqueline Barraine (French: [baʁɛn]; 13 February 1910 – 20 March 1999) was a composer of French music in the time after the neoclassicist movement of Les Six, Ravel, and Stravinsky. Despite being considered "one of the outstanding French composers of the mid-20th century," Barraine's music is seldom performed today. She won the Prix de Rome in 1929 for La vierge guerrière, a sacred trilogy named for Joan of Arc, and was the fourth woman ever to receive that prestigious award (after Lili Boulanger in 1913, Marguerite Canal in 1920, and Jeanne Leleu in 1923). Barraine's Symphony No. 2 "Voïna", composed in 1938, was a huge success when it received its world premiere performance by the BBC Symphony Orchestra under the direction of Manuel Rosenthal at Covent Garden on July 7, 1946 during the opening concert of the 1946 ISCM Festival in London. The headline of Philip Whitacre's review of the concert for London's Evening Standard the next day—in which he described the work as "concise, original, and alive"—was "We shall hear more of Mlle. Barraine" and the symphony was hailed by Alan Frank in The Musical Times as "expert" and as "France's best contribution" to the festival. Along with Barraine's earlier Symphony No. 1 (1931), it has been commercially recorded twice recently (by the WDR Symphony Orchestra Cologne under the direction of Elena Schwarz for Classic Produktion Osnabrück [cpo] in July 2025 and by the Orchestre National de France under the direction of Cristian Măcelaru for Warner Classics in February 2026).

== Biography ==
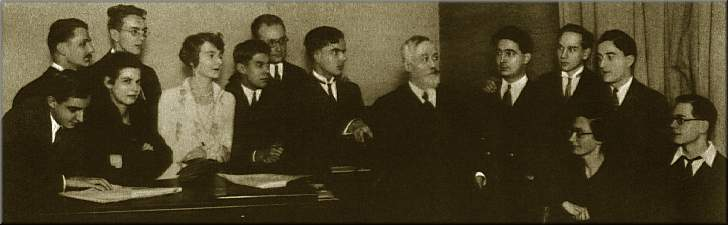
Paul Dukas and his composition students at the Paris Conservatoire, 1929. From left to right, around the piano: Pierre Maillard-Verger, Elsa Barraine, Yvonne Desportes, Tony Aubin, Pierre Revel, Georges Favre, Paul Dukas, René Duclos, Georges Hugon, Maurice Duruflé. Seated on the right: Claude Arrieu, Olivier Messiaen.

Born in Paris to Alfred Barraine, the principal cellist of the Orchestre de l'Opéra, and Octavie Jeanne Barraine (née Boisson), Elsa Barraine began studying piano at a young age. She attended the Conservatoire de Paris and studied composition with Paul Dukas, whose impressive list of students includes Yvonne Desportes, Maurice Duruflé, Claude Arrieu, and Olivier Messiaen. Barraine and Messiaen were good friends throughout their lives and kept in frequent contact. A talented pupil, Barraine won First Prize in harmony at the Conservatoire at age fifteen (1925) and then in fugue and accompaniment when she was seventeen (1927). In 1929 she won the Prix de Rome for her cantata La vierge guerrière, making her the fourth female winner since the competition began in 1803. Her piece Harald Harfagard (1930), symphonic variations based on the poetry of Heinrich Heine, was the first composition of Barraine's to gain public recognition. This was her first work of many to take inspiration from literature, such as the later Avis (1944) and L'homme sur terre (1949), both based on Paul Éluard texts.

Barraine worked at the French National Radio from 1936 to 1940 as a pianist, sound recordist, and the head of singing, then after World War II as a sound mixer. During the war, Barraine was heavily involved in the French Resistance and was a member of the Front National des Musiciens. Between 1944 and 1947 she held the position of Recording Director at the well-established record label Le Chant du Monde. In 1953 Barraine was appointed to the faculty at the Paris Conservatoire, where she taught analysis and sight-reading until 1972. It was then that the Ministry of Culture named her Director of Music, giving her charge of all French national lyric theaters.

She died in 1999 in Strasbourg.

== Compositional style ==
According to James Briscoe in his New Historical Anthology of Music by Women, "The music of Elsa Barraine wins over its listeners by a contrapuntal independence of line, virtuosity, and expressive intensity through motivic and rhythmic drive." It should also be noted that through her time studying with Dukas and the musical influence of Debussy, Barraine developed a keen and effective sense of instrumental timbre and color. She embraced classic forms while making them her own, and used an entirely tonal harmonic language with one notable exception. Her chamber work Musique rituelle (1967) for organ, gongs, and xylorimba features serialism and is inspired by the Tibetan Book of the Dead.

The authors of The Norton/Grove Dictionary of Women Composers observe the following:

Profoundly sensitive to the enormous upheavals of her time, Barraine was unable to dissociate her creative processes from her personal, humanist, political and social pre-occupations.

In all of Elsa Barraine's works there is an ardent focus on the human condition. Like her contemporaries who formed La Jeune France, André Jolivet, Olivier Messiaen, Daniel-Lesur, and Yves Baudrier, she strove to reintroduce humanism to composition, an art becoming increasingly more abstract. While some of her pieces address specific social and political issues, others explore a particular emotion or psychological state. Examples of the former include Claudine à l'école (1950), her ballet based on a book by Colette which explores women's sexuality, and her anti-fascist symphonic poem Pogromes (1933). An example of the latter is Barraine's programmatic woodwind quintet Ouvrage de Dame (1931 - Ed. A.J.Andraud, 1939). The quintet has eight movements, the Theme and seven Variations which are named after fictional women with different personality types ("Angélique; Berthe, aux sonorités dures; Irène, sinueuse; Barbe, fugato burlesque; Sarah; Isabeau de Bavière, avec son chapeau conique et son voile flottant; Léocadie, vieille fille sentimentale du temps jadis"). She makes clear the differences in temperament of the seven women with her talent for characterization and skillful use of timbre. Once again in the words of James Briscoe, "Her contribution to music is significant, and Elsa Barraine is a major force awaiting full discovery by performers and critics."

== List of compositions ==
Opera, ballet and stage music

- Le Roi bossu, comic opera in one act • (1932)
- Le mur, ballet • (1947)
- Incidental music for Mégarée by Maurice Druon, a play in 3 actes, Bruxelles • (1946)
- Printemps de la liberté, incidental music • (1948)
- La chanson du mal-aimé, ballet in 11 tableaux and a prologue on a libretto by Jean-Jacques Etchevery • (1950)
- Claudine à l'ecole, ballet • (1950)

Orchestral music

- Symphony no.1 • (1931)
- Harald Hafagard, symphonic variations after Heinrich Heine • (1930)
- Pogromes. Ouverture. Illustration Symphonique d'après André Spire • (1933)
- Symphony no.2, "Voïna" • (1938)
- Suite Astrologique for small orchestra • (1945)
- Variations on 'Le Fleuve rouge', symphonic poem (1945)
- Hommage à Prokofiev, for orchestra • (1953)
- 3 Ridicules, for orchestra • (1955)
- Les jongleurs, for orchestra • (1959)
- Les tziganes, for orchestra • (1959)

Concertante music

- Fantaisie concertante for piano and orchestra • (1933)
- Hommage à Prokofiev for harpsichord and orchestra • (1953)
- Musique funèbre pour la Mise au tombeau du Titien for piano and orchestra • (1953)
- Atmosphere for oboe and 10 strings • (1966)

Vocal music

- Héraclès à Delphes, cantata (1928)
- La Vierge guerrière • profane cantata for solo voice, choir and orchestra (1929)
- Melodies • (1930)
- Il y a quelqu'un d'autre je pense, for voice and piano • (1931)
- Je ne réclamais rien de toi pour chant et piano, for voice and piano on a poem by Rabindranat Tagore, translated by André Gide • 1931
- Je suis ici pour te chanter des chansons, for voice and piano on a poem by Rabindranat Tagore, translated by André Gide • 1931
- 3 Chansons Hebraiques • (1935)
- Chants Juifs • (1937)
- Avis, for choir and orchestra to the memory of Georges Dudach on a text by Paul Éluard • (1944),
- Poesie Ininterrompue, cantata for 2 voices and orchestra • (1948)
- L'homme sur Terre, for choir and orchestra • (1949)
- La nativité, sur un poème de L. Masson, for solo voices, choir and orchestra • (1951)
- Les Cinq plaies, cantata on a text by Michel Manoll • (1953)
- Cantate du vendredi saint • (1955)
- Les paysans, cantata on a poeme by André Frénaud for 2 voices and orchestra • (1958)
- Christine, for solo voice, choir and orchestra • (1959)
- De premier mai en premier mai, for 4 voices and choir • (1977)

Chamber music

- Wind quintet • (1931)
- Pièce en quintette, for piano quintet • (1932)
- Élégie et ronde, for flute and piano • (1936)
- Crépuscules, for French horn and piano • (1936)
- Ouvrage de Dame, chamber music with diverse instruments • (1937)
- Improvisation, for saxophone and piano • (1947)
- Variations, for percussion and piano • (1950)
- Suite Juive, for violin and piano • (1951)
- Fanfare de Printemps, for cornet and piano • (1954)
- Andante & Allegro, for saxhorn in Bb and piano • (1958)
- Musique Rituelle, trio for organ, gong, tam tam and xylorimba • (1967)

Instrumental music

- 2 Preludes and fugues, for organ • (1929)
- Prelude for piano, character piece • (1930)
- Hommage à Paul Dukas for piano • (1936)
- Marche du printemps sans amour for piano • (1946)
- La boite de Pandore for piano • (1955)
- Fantaisie, for harpsichord (or piano), character piece • (1961)
- Chien de paille, for tuba • (1966)

Sacred music

- Cantique du Vendredi Saint • (1955) • Hymns

Film scores

- Au coeur de l'orage • (1948)
- White Paws • (1949)
- Je sème à tout vent • (1952)
- Le coeur d'amour épris du roi René • (1952)
- L'amour d'une femme • (1953)
- Le sabotier du Val de Loire • (1956)
- Ars • (1960)

== Social and political issues ==
=== Criticism and sexism ===
Despite winning numerous prestigious awards, Elsa Barraine dealt with sexist attitudes in her professional career. Karin Pendle cites music critic René Dumesnil as an unfortunately common offender: “Like others of his time (and even today), Dumesnil voiced a kind of grudging respect for many of these composers as long as they were content to remain feminine in their music.” Dumesnil once described Barraine's fellow Prix de Rome prizewinner Jeanne Leleu as having “a vigor that one rarely encounters in works by women.” As for Barraine, he referred to her as “the writer of prettily orchestrated melodies.”

=== Involvement in the French Resistance ===
Elsa Barraine was an active member of the Front National des Musiciens, an organization of musicians involved in the French Resistance during the German Occupation between 1940 and 1944. The main goals of the organization were listed in their journal, Musiciens d’Aujourd’hui, and were to organize concerts of new and banned French music, to support Jewish musicians by providing shelter or money, to arrange anti-German and anti-Collaborationist protests, and to engage in any and all forms of musical rebellion. The résistant French conductor Roger Désormière, Les Six member Louis Durey, and Barraine together released a “manifesto for ‘the defence of French music’ and against any collaboration with the Nazis.” Her heavy involvement in the Resistance was particularly brave, considering the fact that she seems to have had a Jewish background.
