= Jacques Chailley =

French musicologist and composer (1910–1999)

Jacques Chailley (24 March 1910 – 21 January 1999) was a French musicologist and composer.

== Biography ==
Chailley's mother was the pianist Céliny Chailley-Richez (1884–1973), his father the cellist Marcel Chailley (1881–1936). As an adolescent, he was a boarder at the Fontgombault Abbey (Indre) where he learned to play the organ and learned about choir directing. At the age of 14, he composed a four-voice Domine non sum dignus.

He received a classical and musical training of high quality, studying harmony with Nadia Boulanger, counterpoint and fugue with Claude Delvincourt, musicology with Yvonne Rokseth who gave him insight into medieval music. At the Conservatoire de Paris, he followed Maurice Emmanuel's class of music history and studied music composition with Henri Büsser (himself a disciple of Charles Gounod). At the Sorbonne, he studied music history with André Pirro, with whom he presented his first musicological work in 1935 (DES, "Diplôme d'Études Supérieures"). He also took classes of conducting with Pierre Monteux, Willem Mengelberg and Bruno Walter in Amsterdam, while resident in the Descartes House (1935–1936). There, he also studied musicology with Albert Smijers.

Passionate about Medieval music for which he devoted much of his musicological activity, he founded in 1934 the choir Psalette Notre-Dame in order to revive it. In the same way, he founded at the Sorbonne under the direction of Gustave Cohen, the theater group the Théophiliens. Finally, he was actively involved in the founding of the Groupe de Théâtre antique de la Sorbonne (In particular with Jacques Veil and Roland Barthes). In this university, he completed his two theses on music, within the framework of the curriculum of Medieval French literature: L'École musicale de Saint-Martial de Limoges jusqu'à la fin du XIe as well as Chansons de Gautier du Coinci.

It was from this period that his intense musicological production began with works devoted to Medieval music and musical theory and to the evolution of musical languages, to musical notation, as well as to several composers, including Johann Sebastian Bach, Mozart, Schubert, Berlioz, Schumann, Wagner. At the same time, he did not neglect the teaching and popularization works (music history, method of piano reading, guide for young pianists, etc.).

Chailley was a member of a resistance movement gathered around the French Communist Party: the Front National des Musiciens, created in May 1941, during the Second World War, after the invasion of the USSR by the German armies. It was a specific resistance organization for music professionals, created by Elsa Barraine, Roger Désormière, Louis Durey (all three close to the French Communist Party), Roland-Manuel (himself a Jew, former student of Vincent d'Indy at the Schola Cantorum), and Claude Delvincourt.

From 1946 to 1961, he directed the choir "L'Alauda". In 1969, he was also appointed the second president of the Consociatio internationalis musicæ sacræ, created in 1963 by Pope Paul VI. Chailley remained in this position until 1974.

In 1952, following the defense of his PhD on L'école musicale de Saint Martial de Limoges and his election as professor at the Sorbonne in the chair of History of music left vacant by Paul-Marie Masson, Chailley took over the Institute of Musicology of the University of Paris, which he transformed in 1969–1970 in the UER (Unité d'enseignement et de recherche, later UFR, Unité de formation et de recherche) of music and musicology of the new Paris-Sorbonne University>. He directed this UER until 1973. He directed the doctoral theses of many recognized musicologists (including Barry S. Brook, Trần Văn Khê, Simha Arom, Amnon Shiloah, Mireille Helffer, Jacques Viret, Michel Hugo, Jean-Rémy Julien, Annie Labussière, Danièle Pistone...). Between 1973 and 1975, he obtained the creation of the CAPES and the Agrégation in musical education and choral singing. He thus facilitated the recognition of musicology at the university as an autonomous discipline and enabled many musicians to find a more stable professional situation. He was also Inspector General of Music at the Ministry of National Education and director of the Schola Cantorum in Paris from 1962 until c. 1982.

His erudition and eclecticism, but also his distinct character and marked opinions, made him one of the principal figures in the post-war French musical life. Always remained in the post-Debussy French tradition with a modal language close to Ravel, Roussel and Honegger and firmly opposed the atonality and serialism "avant-gardes" (very much in vogue in the post-war years). He leaves a work of 129 opus numbers.

== Controversy ==
Chailley was secretary-general (1937), then assistant director (1941) of the Conservatoire de Paris. His role during the war has been subject of controversy.

Jean Gribenski, who taught at the Sorbonne under the orders of Chailley, mentions in a chapter of the collective book La vie musicale sous Vichy, that in collaboration with Henri Rabaud in 1940, he drew up a list of the Jewish students of the Conservatory of Paris:

The eviction of Jewish pupils takes place in two stages. The first stage starts at the beginning of October 1940. [...] The management of the conservatory (Rabaud? Chailley, of his own initiative?) carries out a meticulous survey among the pupils between 4 and 10 October. His results are recorded in a voluminous file, almost entirely by Chailley's hand, which includes, in particular, the individual declarations of the pupils and the carefully established lists of names.

Gribenski further specifies that the list drawn up by Rabaud and Chailley was not communicated to the Germans, and that the exclusion of Jewish students took place only two years later, under duress, while the Conservatoire was led by Claude Delvincourt.

That a list was used for the exclusion of Jewish students from the Conservatory was challenged by contemporary Jewish witnesses during the symposium where Gribenski first presented the results of his research in 1999. The controversy reappeared in 2011, after the Sorbonne decided to give Chailley's name to an amphitheater (polemic triggered by an article in the weekly Le Canard enchaîné and furthered in a note in Le Nouvel Observateur.)

Michèle Alten has since published an article based on an in-depth study of the archives, which sheds light on the events of 1940. She writes:

Following remarks of the German authorities, astonished at the non-application of anti-Semitic measures to the pupils, he [Rabaud] sent an internal note to the 60 teachers present on 4 October [1940] in the school, asking them to have their students complete a statement about their racial origins. No nominal synthesis was then performed. Only one booklet, signed by each teacher, attests that the declarations have been fulfilled.

It is to this inquiry that Gribenski's article seems to refer. Alten further writes that Jewish students of the Conservatoire were excluded from participating in the final examinations in 1942, under pressure from the Vichy government.

== Publications ==
Chailley has published many outstanding works, both on Greek and medieval music, on the Passions, the chorales for organ and The Art of Fugue by J. S. Bach, the Carnaval by Schumann, Tristan by Wagner. Worth noting is his interest in the exegesis of the Masonic aspects of The Magic Flute by Mozart, the Winterreise by Schubert and Parsifal by Wagner.

He was also the author of several books on harmony and its history, the question of modality, as well as an important history of multi-volume music and popular works. He also studied musicians of the Middle Ages such as Adam de la Halle, Guillaume de Machaut of whom he prepared the first published transcript of the Messe de Nostre Dame or Gautier de Coincy.

== Works (selection) ==
=== Piano ===
- Suite en si majeur (1923)
- Le Chant de l'Alauda (1932)
- Suite Le Jardin nuptial (1947)
- Sonata breve (1965)
- Ballade romantique (1989)
- numerous pieces for children (for two and four-hands)

=== Organ ===
- Triptyque (1984–87)
- L'Annonciation (1984–87)
- Prélude-Dédicace (1985)
- Paraphrases liturgiques (1984–87)

=== Chamber music ===
- Minuetto scherzando, for violin and piano (1932)
- Double cantabile for violin, viola and organ (or piano) (1935)
- Albenga for violin and piano (1935)
- Aria, for viola and piano (1936)
- Deux sonneries en fanfare dans le style du XIIIe siecle, for brass instruments (1936)
- String quartet (1939)
- Sonata for viola and piano (1939–41)
- Suite Enfantine for wind quintet (1976)
- Sonata for solo violin (1987)
- Suite a l'ancienne, for flute and harpsichord (1996)

=== Orchestra ===
- Suite sur des airs Scouts, for small orchestra (1929)
- Symphony in G minor (1942–47)
- Danses et Conduits – Suite du XIIIe siecle (1947)
- 2nd Symphonie (1984)
- Cantabile for strings (1971)
- Mors est Rolanz for wind instruments (1975)
- Solmisation for strings (1977)

=== Singing and piano ===
- Song cycle:
  - Le pèlerin d'Assise (1932–42)
  - A ma femme (1949–54)
  - Poèmes sur la mort (1982)
  - 7 Chansons légères (1983)
  - Le Chien à la mandoline (1987)
- numerous solo songs, including:
  - Le Menuisier du Roi (1945, M. Fombeure)
  - Plainte de Rachel
- Cantique du soleil (with 4 Ondes Martenot, also for Orchester; 1934)

=== Choir a cappella ===
- L'Arbre de paradis (1933, L. Chancerel)
- La Tentation de saint Antoine (1936; Instr. ad libitum)
- Chant de la fidélité (1946)
- Kyrie des gueux (1946)
- Missa Solemnis (1947)
- Aux Morts pour la patrie (1953, V. Hugo)
- Messe brève de angelis (1955)
- Messe Orbis factor (1959)
- Demeure le secret (1962, M. Pol-Fouchet; Doublechoir)
- Fables de mon jardin (1961, G. Duhamel)
- numerous Motets, partially with organ
- zahlreiche Volksliedbearbeitungen

=== Singing and instruments ===
- Exercices de style (1965, Raymond Queneau)
- 7 Fantaisies for equal voices and piano
- Les Grandes Heures de Reims (1938; narrator, singing and orchester)
- Jeanne devant Reims (1941; Choir and orchester)
- Le Cimetière marin (1980; Choir and orchester)

=== Oratorio ===
- Casa Dei (1991, Y. Hucher)
- Eloge de la Sagesse (1992)

=== Operas ===
- Pan et la Syrinx (1946)
- Le Jeu de Robin et Marion (1950)
- Thyl de Flandre (1949–54)

=== Ballet ===
- La Dame la licorne (1953)

=== Incidental music ===
- Les Perses (1936)
- Antigone (1939),
- Agamemnon (1947)
- La Belle au bois (1951)

== Writings ==
Jacques Chailley's musicological work comprises 53 books and 429 diverse articles. Among his main works are:

- Petite histoire de la chanson populaire française. Paris: Presses Universitaires de France, 1942. 16°, 64 p.
- Théorie complète de la musique 1er Cycle with Henri Challan, foreword by Claude Delvincourt. Paris: Alphonse Leduc. AL20444, 1947, 95 p.
- Théorie complète de la musique 2ème Cycle with Henri Challan, foreword by Claude Delvincourt. Paris: Alphonse Leduc. AL20631, 1951, 78 p.
- Abrégé de la Théorie de la Musique with Henri Challan, foreword by Claude Delvincourt. Paris: Alphonse Leduc. AL20551, 1948.
- Histoire musicale du Moyen Âge. Paris: Presses Universitaires de France, 1950. 2nd edition: 1969, 336 p.
- Les notations musicales nouvelles. Paris: Alphonse Leduc, 1950.
- La musique médiévale. Paris: Éditions du Coudrier, 1951
- Précis de musicologie, PUF, 1958, 1984.
- Traité historique d'analyse musicale. Paris: Alphonse Leduc, 1951, reissued in 1977 under the title Traité historique d'analyse harmonique.
- L'Imbroglio des modes. Paris: Alphonse Leduc, [1960]. 4°, 92 p. Reissued in 1977.
- 40000 ans de musique. Paris: Plon, [1961], 326 p. Reissued in Paris: L'Harmattan, 2000, 328 p.
- Les Passions de J.S. Bach. Paris: Presses universitaires de France, 1963. 4°, 455 p. 2nd éd. 1984.
- Cours d'histoire de la musique, préparation aux professorats d'enseignement musical et aux instituts de musicologie... Paris: Alphonse Leduc, 1967. 8°. Numerous reissues.
- Jacques Chailley (1975). Le voyage d'hiver de Schubert. Au-delà des notes (in French). Paris: Alphonse Leduc. OCLC 1913297.
- Éléments de philologie musicale. Paris : Alphonse Leduc, 1985. ISBN 2-85689-027-X
