= Mannersdorf am Leithagebirge =

- Municipality
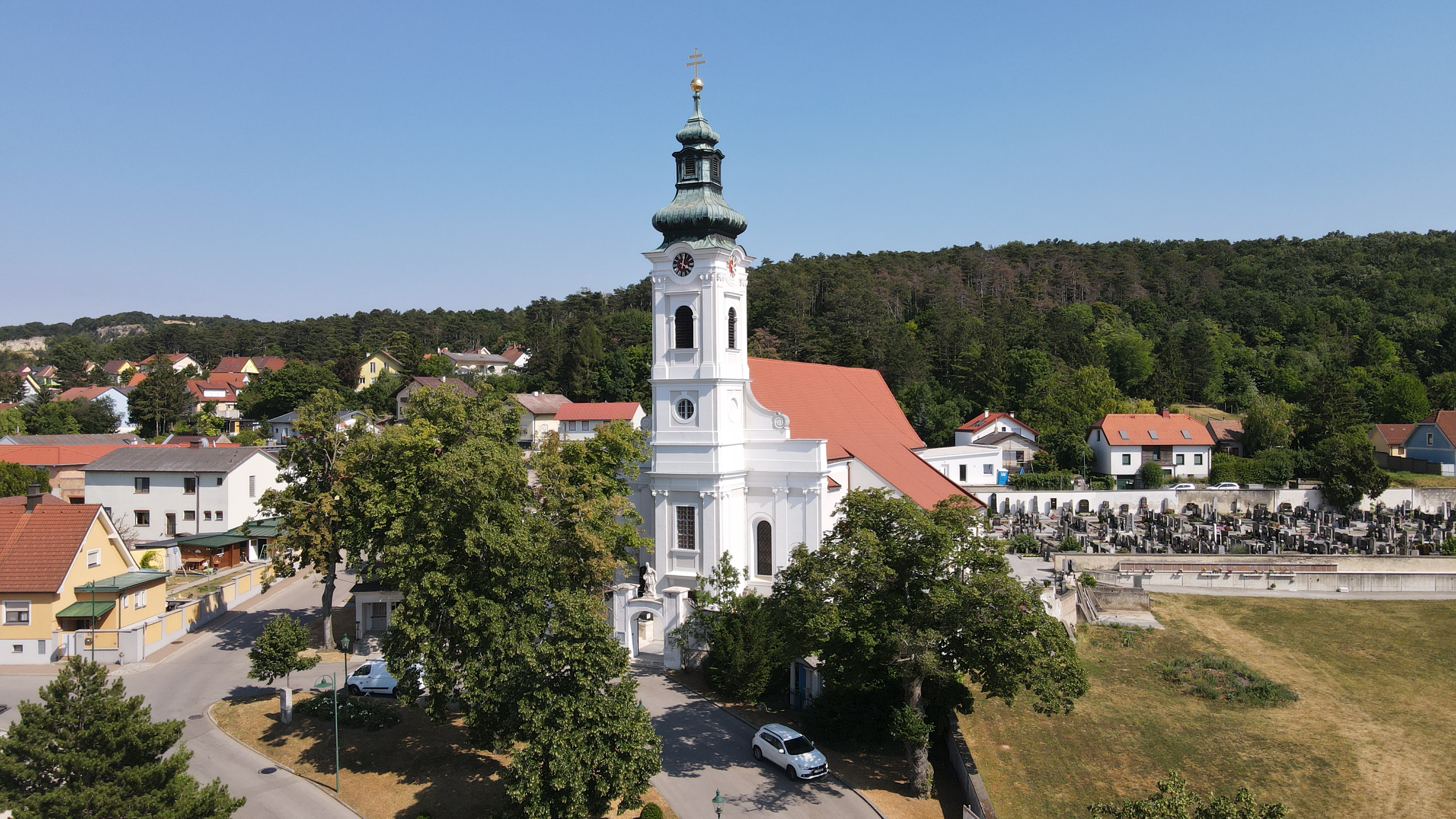
- Parish church of Mannersdorf am Leithagebirge

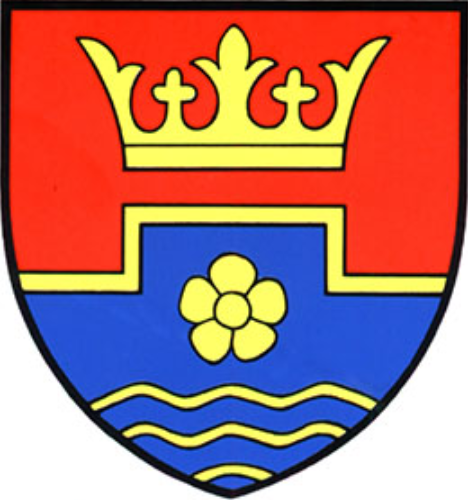
- Coat of arms

- Location within Lower Austria Location within Austria
- Coordinates: 47°58′N 16°36′E
- Country: Austria
- State: Lower Austria
- District: Bruck an der Leitha

Government
  - Mayor: Gerhard David

Area
  - Total: 29.92 km^{2} (11.55 sq mi)
- Elevation: 212 m (696 ft)

Population (2018-01-01)
  - Total: 4,069
  - Density: 136.0/km^{2} (352.2/sq mi)
- Time zone: UTC+1 (CET)
  - Summer (DST): UTC+2 (CEST)
- Postal code: 2452
- Area code: 02168
- Website: www.mannersdorf-leithagebirge.gv.at

Mannersdorf am Leithagebirge is a town in Austria. It is located in the district of Bruck an der Leitha in the state of Lower Austria. Mannersdorf is seated at the base of a range of wooded hills called the Leitha Mountains (Leithagebirge), from which it receives its full name. It overlooks an agricultural plain, through which flows the Leitha River, about two miles away.

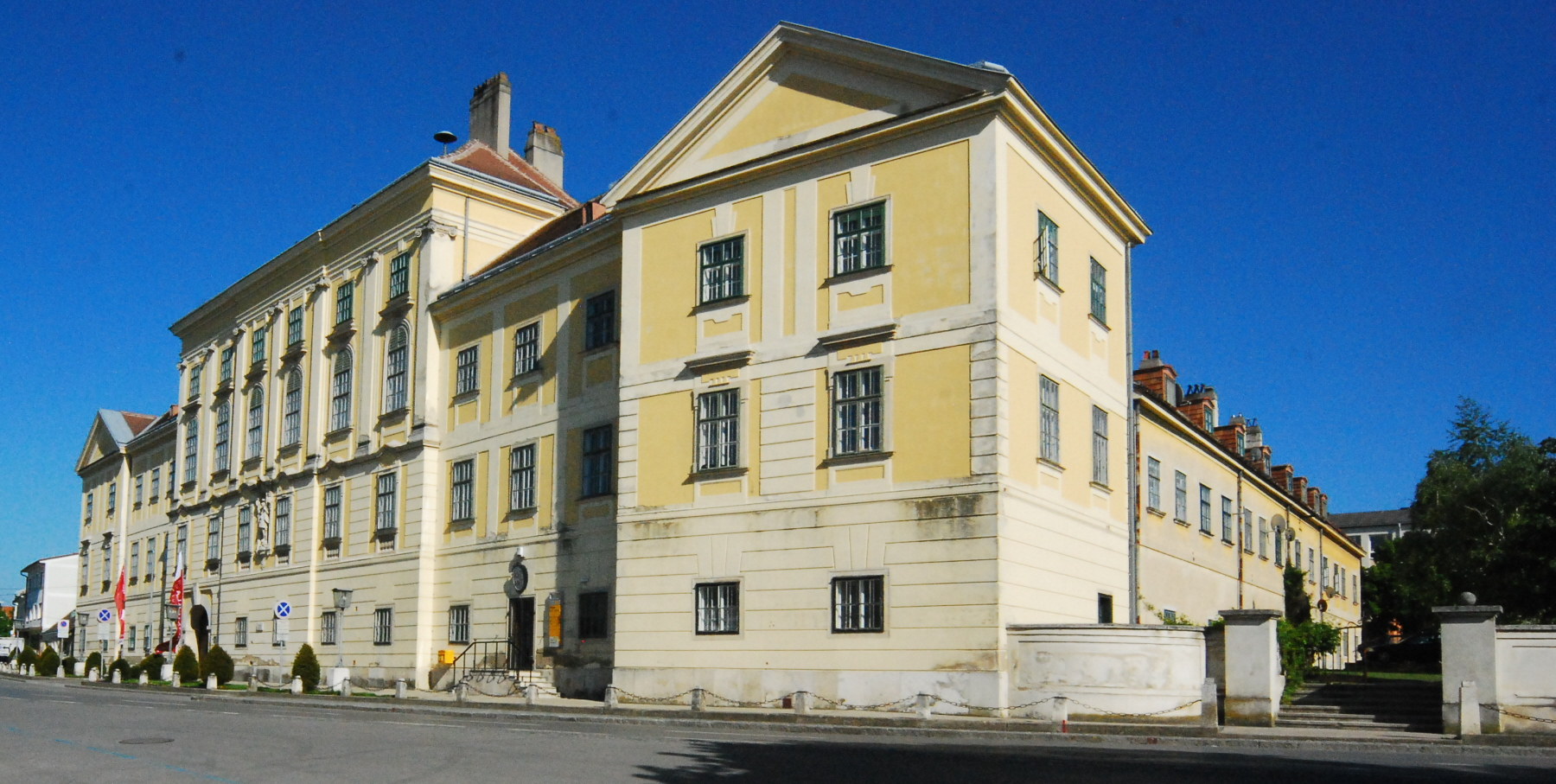
Palace

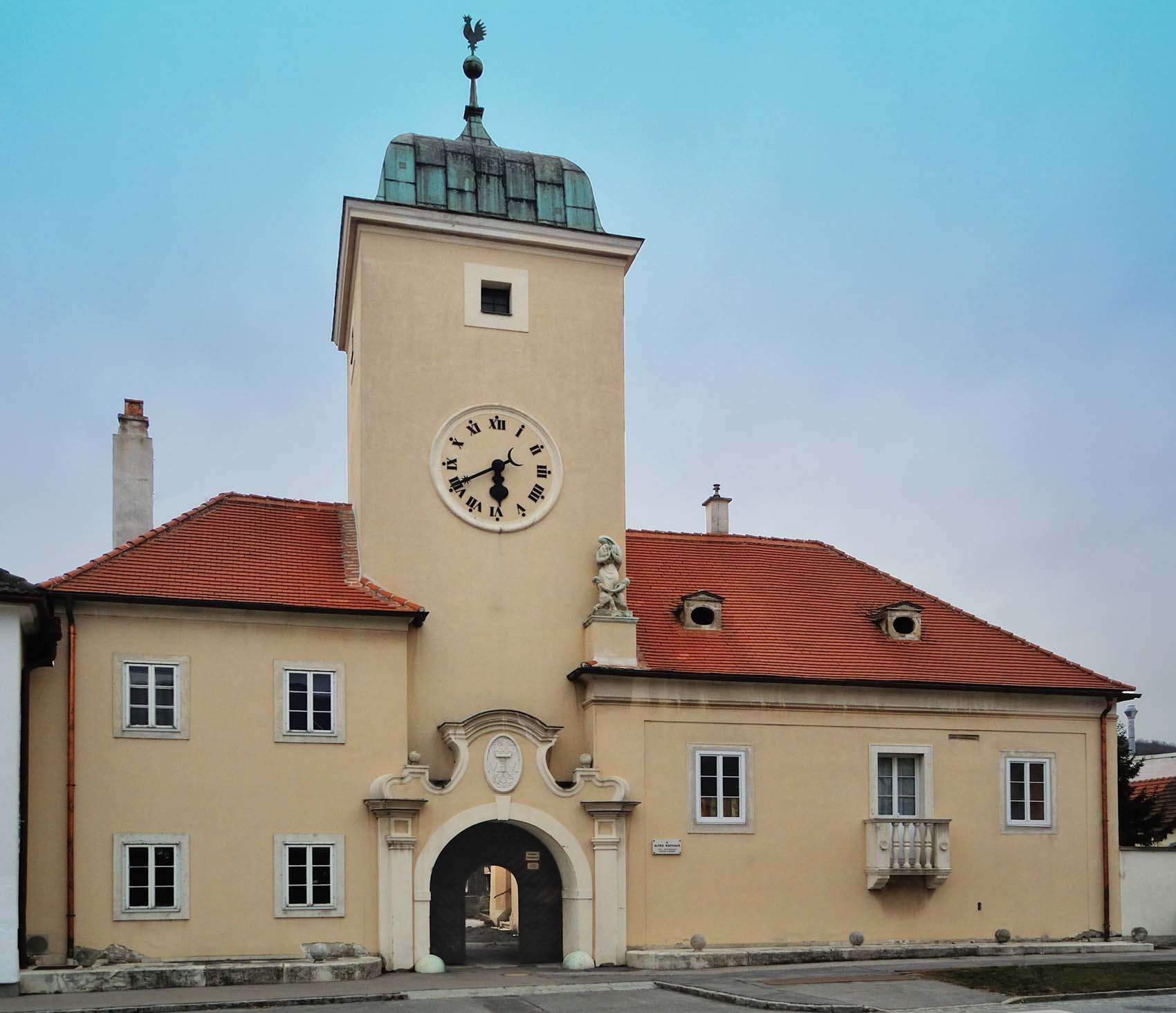
Former town hall

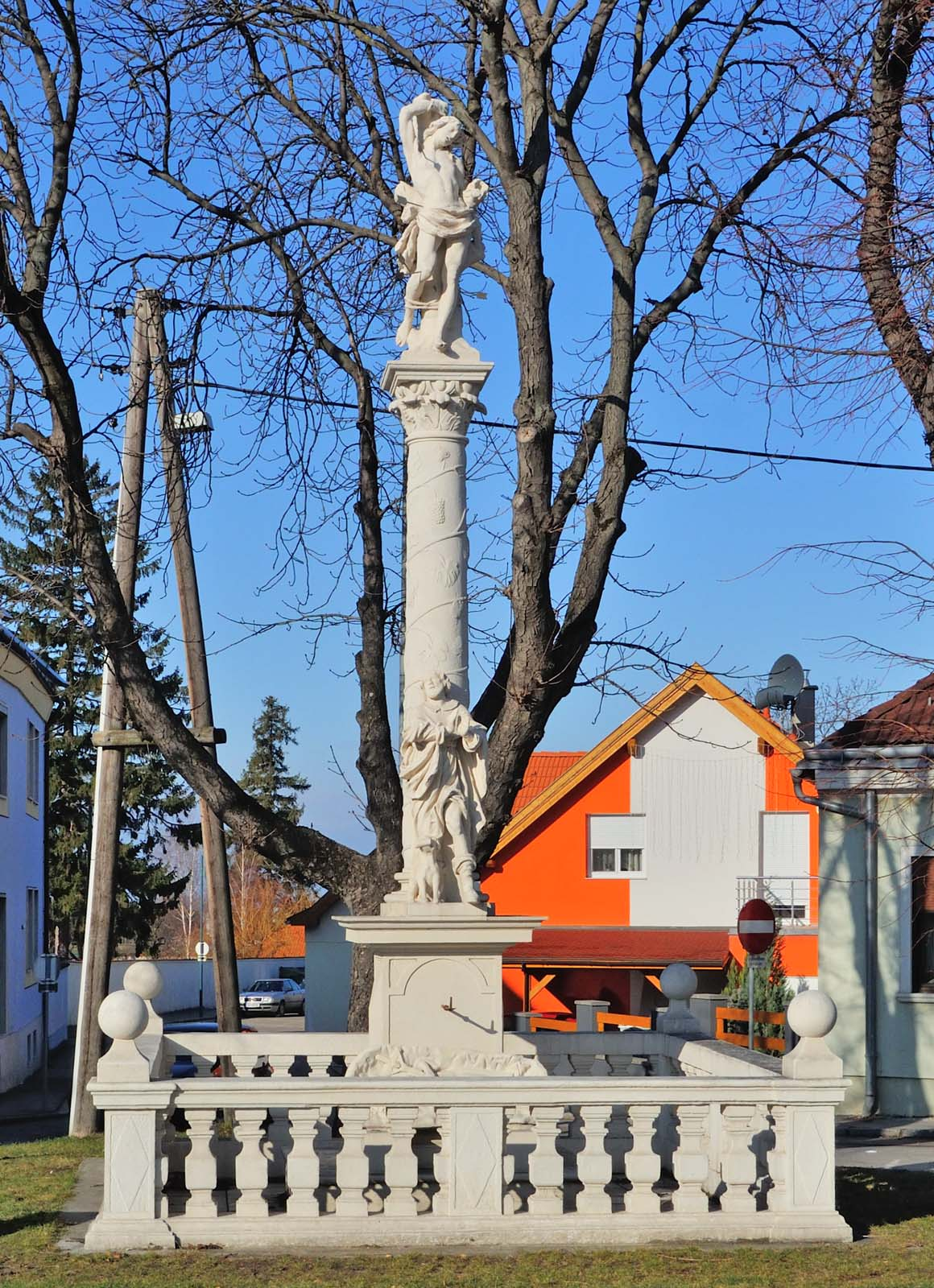
Plague column

== History ==
The area of Mannerdorf has been inhabited since Neolithic times, as the archaeological materials in the municipal museum demonstrate. Excavations in 1981 indicate that the town itself has existed for at least 1000 years; the earliest historical mention is from 1233.

Mannersdorf lies along historical invasion routes and its history has not been entirely serene. The town was razed by invading Turkish armies in 1529 and 1683, and burnt to the ground in 1704, 1705 and 1708 by the rebelling Hungarian forces known as the Kuruzzen. In 1805, 1809, and 1810, French troops were quartered there, following successful invasions of Austria by Napoleon. Soviet troops occupied the town near the end of World War II, in 1945.

=== The baths ===
In 1517, a Dr. Enzianer, who was Rector of the University of Vienna and court physician, established a bathing establishment, making use of the waters of a slightly sulfurous spring, temperature 22.5 degrees C. This spa remained popular for about 250 years. In the mid 18th century the spa was quite fashionable, visited by members of the Imperial family including Empress Maria Theresia. The baths continued until 1786, when they were closed by a decree of Emperor Joseph II. The baths were reopened only much later (1928), and continue to operate today, more as a water park (with pools and a water slide) than as a traditional spa.

=== Musical history ===
Mannersdorf was also a center of music. During the fashionable apogee of the 18th century, Prince Hildburghausen put on concerts and operatic productions in the town, and eminent musicians came to perform and visit the spa.

The composer Joseph Haydn spent three summer months in Mannersdorf in 1753, though being only 21 and a struggling freelancer, he came not as a tourist but more or less as a servant. The ambassador of Venice to the Austrian Empire, Pietro Correr, visited the spa in the company of his mistress, who required the presence of the singing teacher who regularly taught her in Vienna. This was the Italian composer Nicola Porpora. At the time, Haydn was working for Porpora as an accompanist and valet. He was placed on salary in the Correr establishment at a rate of six ducats per month and ate his meals with the Correr servants. The visit was a career opportunity for the young Haydn, as the famous composers Gluck and Wagenseil heard him play.

A monument on the Schubertplatz commemorates Haydn's stay.

== Notable sights ==
- A local museum displays archaeological finds of the early La Tène culture.
- An early Baroque parish church (1638)
- A fine palace, built ca. 1600; possibly re-built in part by J. E. Fischer von Erlach in the 18th century. Since 1952 it has been a municipal administration building.
- The historical town hall built between the 17th and 18th centuries (see image)
- A plague column, thought to date from 1714 and commemorating plagues that struck Mannersdorf in 1679 and 1713.
- The ruins of a Carmelite hermitage called "In der Wüste" ("In the desert", 1644-1783)
- The ruins of Scharfeneck Castle

== Economy ==
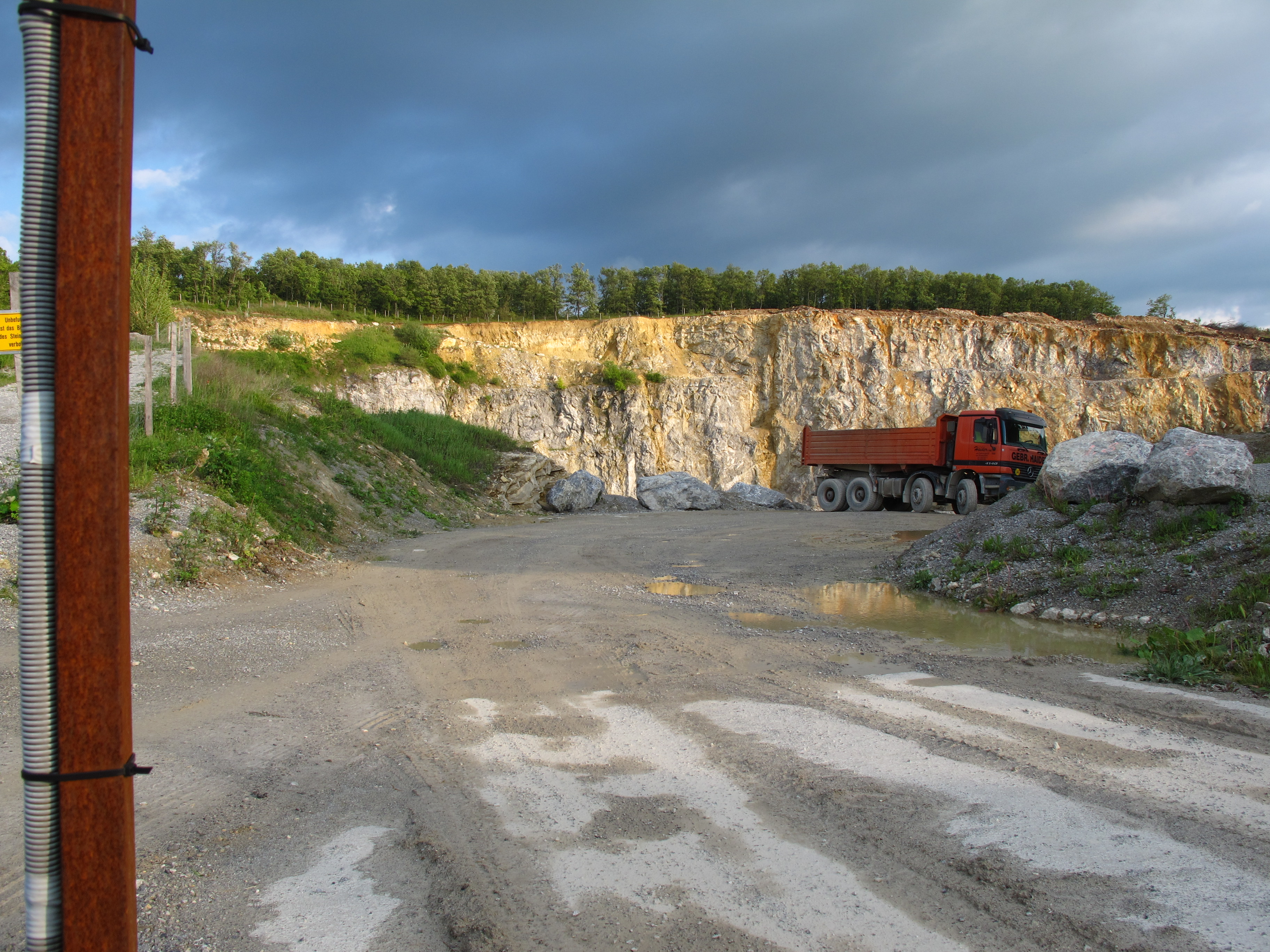
The limestone quarry in the hills just south of Mannersdorf.

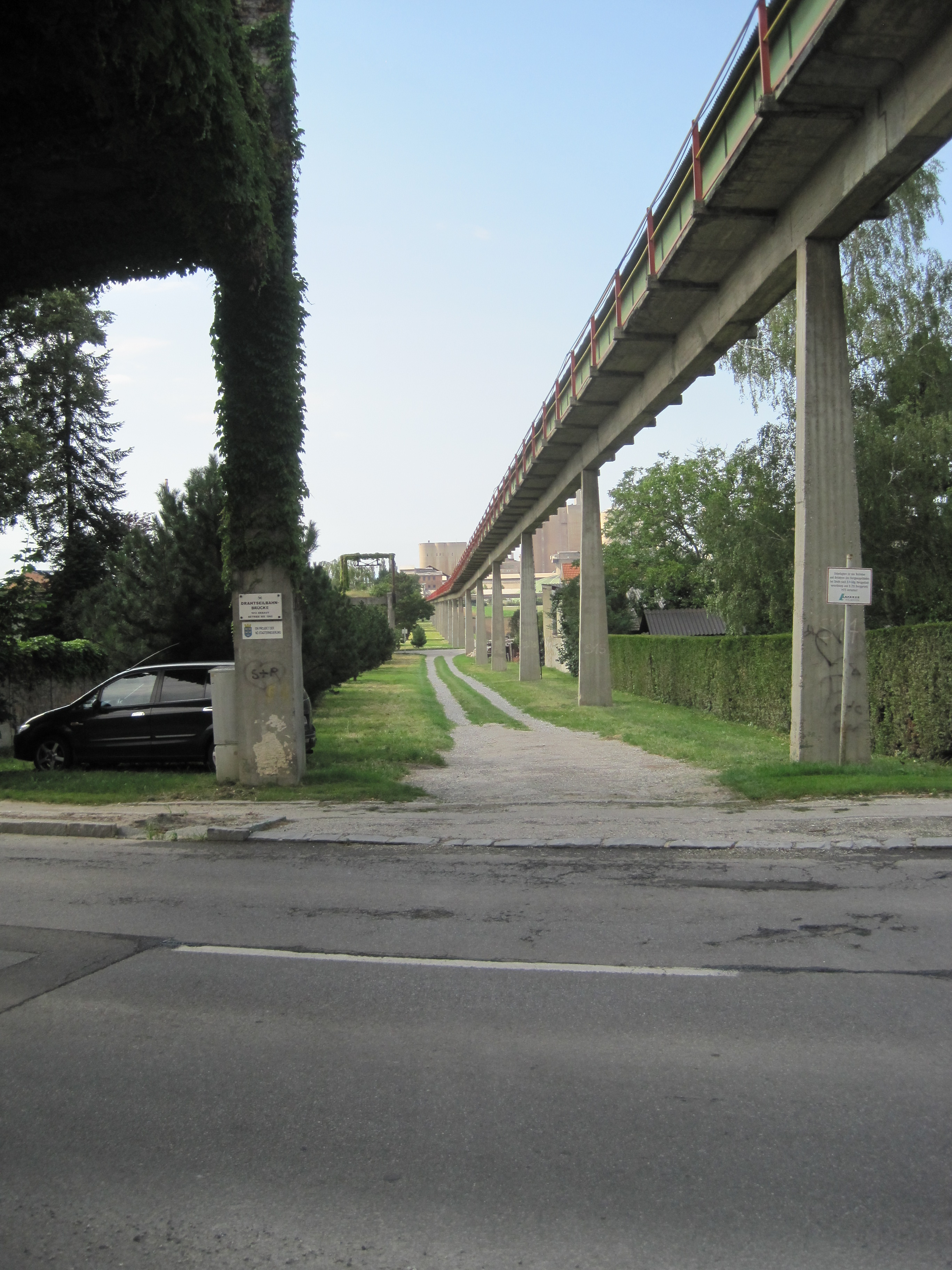
The conveyor system for limestone passing through the town. In the background the concrete plant is visible.

Industry and commerce dominate the local economy. Above the town on the lower slopes of the Leithagebirge is a very large limestone quarry, which provided the stone for many of the historic buildings of Vienna and other cities of central Europe. Today, the quarried limestone is used for the manufacture of concrete. An enormous concrete plant, the largest in Austria, is seated on the agricultural plain below the town; it is owned by the Lafarge-Perlmooser firm. Stone is conveyed to the plant, without the need for heavy vehicular traffic, by an elevated conveyor device that passes through the town.
