= Front National des Musiciens =

Organization of musicians in Nazi-occupied France

Known by several names, including 'Comité de Front national des musiciens', the Front national des musiciens was an organisation of musicians in Nazi-occupied France that was part of the French Resistance set up at the instigation of the French Communist Party, in May 1941. Active until the autumn of 1944, the group's most prominent members were composers Elsa Barraine and Louis Durey, and conductor Roger Désormière.

== Origins ==
Elsa Barraine, Roger Désormière and Louis Durey (all Communist militants) met in the autumn of 1940. The group, led by Elsa Barraine, published a manifesto in September 1941 in L'Université libre, the clandestine magazine created by Jacques Decour ("We refuse to betray", the musicians declared). From April 1942, the group published its own clandestine journal, Musiciens d'aujourd'hui (incorporated into Les Lettres françaises from March 1944) and then, from September 1943, a second journal, Le Musicien Patriote. Barraine, Auric, Désormière and others used this medium to counter German and Vichy propaganda (notably in Comœdia or on Radio-Paris), denounce collaborators, encourage musicians to join the Resistance, and praise the successes achieved here and there, such as (more or less confidential) concerts featuring works by banned composers. They also publicised the latest actions of the Francs-Tireurs et Partisans.

== Aims ==
Their aims were defined in underground publications: Musiciens d'aujourd'hui and Musiciens français. Musicians should resist by refusing all collaboration with German media (particularly Radio Paris) and events and make things difficult for the Vichy government. They should refuse forced labour and help those in hiding, including FTP fighters. They should form Front national committees in orchestras and institutions; contribute to underground newspapers; support the Resistance financially or join its ranks. They should use concerts to inspire patriotism. Finally, they should organize for mass demonstrations, like on November 11 and prepare for armed struggle by forming militia groups to join the national insurrection.

== Members and supporters ==
The group had no more than thirty members, including : Francis Poulenc, Georges Auric, Arthur Honegger (his attitude appearing ambiguous, he was disbarred in 1943), Irène Joachim, Roland-Manuel, Claude Delvincourt (flanked by organist Marie-Louise Boëllmann, Henri Dutilleux and Jacques Chailley, he created the Orchestre des Cadets du Conservatoire to rescue young musicians from the Service du travail obligatoire), Manuel Rosenthal, Charles Munch and Paul Paray.

Friends of several FNM members, Lily Pastré and Marguerite Fournier offered hospitality to many musicians in distress.

== Actions ==
The musicians' resistance took many forms: Désormière helped musicians in times of adversity, for example by publishing under his own name scores by Jean Wiéner for films by Louis Daquin, Paul Grimault, Robert Vernay. He was careful to keep French composers in the programmes of his concerts and recordings. This was likely to be all the more important as "[n]ever have we seen greater crowds in Parisian concert halls than since the beginning of the events which, normally, should have half paralysed musical activity."

Another form of resistance consisted in giving concerts featuring banned works, as part of the Concerts de la Pléiade launched by Gaston Gallimard from 1943, for example. It could also involve praising French musical heritage, by defending Debussy as a representative of the French school, while others would have liked to turn him into a Wagnerian.

While some composers stopped composing (Durey, and to a lesser extent Auric), others practised musical smuggling: playing fragments of patriotic airs inserted into other works in front of the Germans. Poulenc inserted a passage from a patriotic song, Alsace et Lorraine, in the score of Animaux modèles "premiered at the Paris Opéra on 8 August 1942 before an audience of German officers, with choreography by Serge Lifar" (Le Bail, p. 178); Auric quoted a few notes from la Marseillaise at the end of his setting of Aragon's poem 'La Rose et le Réséda'. Similarly, an instrumentalist at the Opéra Garnier played a few notes of la Marseillaise during a performance of Carmen.

In the minds of FNM members, setting poems to music was a way of highlighting the richness of French literature, as well as publicising texts by banned authors, some of whom had been published clandestinely (Aragon, Éluard, Jean Bruller (better known in France as "Vercors"), Jean Cassou, Charles Vildrac, Supervielle) and to tackle provocative or subversive themes: Poulenc sang of peace in 1938, following the Munich crisis, in Priez pour paix (a poem by Charles, Duke of Orléans); Jean Françaix slipped a eulogy of peace into the second part of his Cantate pour le tricentenaire de Maximilien de Béthune Duc de Sully (1941); Paul Arma sang of freedom in his setting of Jean Bruller's 'Fuero' (1944, in one of the Chants du Silence), and Dutilleux did the same with Cassou's 'La Geôle', as did Poulenc with Éluard's 'Liberté' (Figure humaine, 1943).

Some works were veritable calls to resistance: in May 1944, Barraine composed Avis, which Éluard had dedicated to the memory of a resistance fighter, Georges Dudach, shot at the Fort Mont-Valérien on May 23, 1942 by the Germans. In this poem, Eluard evokes the millions of comrades ready to rise up to avenge him. The work could not be played until the end of the war.

Arma's À la jeunesse (Les Chants du silence, premiered after the war) takes up a text by Romain Rolland encouraging young people to fight and succeed where their elders had failed. In "La Rose et le réséda", set to music by Auric in 1943, Aragon called on the French to transcend their divisions to resist the common enemy.

Auric (in Quatre chants de la France malheureuse) also set to music Le petit bois by Jules Supervielle (Poèmes de la France Malheureuse, 1939–41) in which the said wood refuses to disappear: "Mon Dieu comme il est difficile / D'être un petit bois disparu / Lorsqu'on avait tant de racines / Comment faire pour n'être plus."

The same kind of stimulating allusion appears in Prière du Prophète Jérémie (Two prayers for unhappy times, music by Manuel Rosenthal, 1942): "Our inheritance has passed to strangers, our homes to outsiders." The text is indeed taken from the Book of Lamentations by the biblical prophet Jeremiah.

Two poems by Maurice Fombeure set to music by Poulenc (Chansons villageoises, 1942) also contain allusions: a threat to enemies at the end of the poem Le Mendiant (Tremblez, ah maudite race / Qui n'avez point de pitié) and a reference to the Cross of Lorraine in Chanson du clair tamis. K. Le Bail (p. 178) quotes Musiciens d'Aujourd'hui (No. 3, April 1942), which evokes the galvanising power of a reference to the greatness of France: "The fact of playing as a supplement to a programme a piece whose content glorifies France can galvanise..." and gives as an example Pierre Bernac who sang "as an encore to his recital at the Salle Gaveau the melody 'C' by Poulenc on the poem by Aragon.

Swiss Composer Arthur Honegger is a special case as he was suspected of collaboration (without any concrete evidence to prove this). The fact remains that he composed the music for the films Secrets (1942) and Un seul amour (1943) directed by a member of the Resistance, filmmaker Pierre Blanchar (a member of the Comité de libération du cinéma français formed in 1943, which he chaired from 19 September 1944). One might also think of his second symphony (completed in 1941), marked by the tragedy of the occupation, whose finale nevertheless offers a glimmer of hope.

K. Le Bail also mentions Charles Munch's decision to play Le Bardit des Francs by Albert Roussel, the last line of which reads "Nous sourirons quand il faudra mourir!", in November 1942; Hymne à la justice by Albéric Magnard, who tried to resist the Germans in 1914 and was killed (17 October 1943); Jacques Ibert's Ouverture de fête (more or less banned by Vichy), premiered in January 1942. Honegger wrote an enthusiastic review of it in Comoedia); when he was not allowed to play A Midsummer Night's Dream, he replaced it with Patrie, symphonic overture, by Bizet (Le Bail, p. 178).

Stéphane Guégan points out in Les arts sous l'Occupation that "Diving into culture is a form of resistance that ultimately contributed to the liberation of minds and of the country".

== Other works ==
Works not mentioned above include:

- Auric, Six poèmes de Paul Éluard (1940–41) and Quatre Chants de la France malheureuse (1943, poems by Supervielle, Éluard et Aragon).
- Poulenc, the cantata Figure humaine on eight poems by Éluard (1943, published clandestinely); Un soir de neige (1944, text by Éluard) and two works on poems by Aragon, C and Fêtes galantes.
- Henri Dutilleux, La Geôle. Dutilleux joined the Front national des Musiciens in 1942 : it was thus that he was able to discover Jean Cassou's Trente-trois sonnets composés au secret: La Geôle was premiered on 9 November 1944 by Gérard Souzay with Manuel Rosenthal conducting the Orchestre national de France. It should also be remembered that Dutilleux refused to play for Radio-Paris.
- Arma, Chants du Silence, eleven melodies composed between 1942 and 1945 including: Depuis toujours (Cassou), Confiance (Éluard), Chant du désespéré (Charles Vildrac).
- Henri Sauguet, Force et faiblesse (1943, poems by Paul Éluard); Bêtes et méchants (1944, poem by Paul Éluard); Chant funèbre pour nouveaux héros (1944, poem by Pierre Seghers).
- Claude Arrieu, Cantate des sept poèmes d'amour en guerre on poems by Paul Éluard (Karine Le Bail, p. 178)

== The "Concerts de la Pléiade" ==
There is a detailed article on this subject (in French) : Concerts de la Pléiade

These were concerts launched in 1943 by Gaston Gallimard, based on an idea by Denise Tual who organised them with the help of André Schaeffner. This undertaking was long described as an act of artistic resistance.

The first five concerts, given at the Galerie Charpentier, were private. The first took place on 8 February 1943. The first public performance took place at the salle Gaveau (dress rehearsal on 20 June 1943, reserved for the Jeunesses musicales de France, followed by a concert on 21 June). Later, the concerts were held at the Salle du Conservatoire. The concerts continued until 1947.

The programmes consisted mainly of French works, some early, some recent and some previously unpublished.

In Belgium, Paul Collaer organised a similar kind of concerts for the 'Société privée de musique de chambre' between 1942 and 1944.

== Other musicians in the Resistance ==
At the opéra Garnier, other Resistance groups were formed: the musicians' group and the machinists' group led by Jean Rieussec and Eugène Germain, members of the (banned) Confédération générale du travail|CGT. This group was very active, distributing leaflets, helping Jews, Service du Travail Obligatoire draft dodgers and prisoners' families (including the wife of Jean Hugues, a member of this group who was arrested on 28 April 1942, deported to Auschwitz on 6 July 1942 and died at Birkenau on 16 January 1943), recording songs calling for struggle and taking part in the fight for the Liberation of Paris.

Other people close to the music world resisted in other structures. This was the case, for example, of Raymond Deiss, printer and music publisher, member of the Armée des Volontaires, who launched an underground newspaper, Pantagruel, from October 1940 until he was arrested a year later.

== See also ==
- National Front (French Resistance)
- Liste de chansons révolutionnaires ou de résistance

== Bibliography ==
- Myriam Chimènes (dir.), La vie musicale sous Vichy, Éditions Complexe – IRPMF-CNRS, coll. « Histoire du temps présent », 2001
- Myriam Chimènes et Yannick Simon (dir.), La Musique à Paris sous l’Occupation, Fayard, 2013.
- Daniel Virieux, Le Front National de lutte pour la liberté et l'indépendance de la France, Un mouvement de résistance. Période clandestine (mai 1941-août 1944) (PhD, Université Paris VIII), 1996.
- Yannick Simon, Composer sous Vichy, Symétrie, 2009.
- Guy Hervy, Guy Krivopissko, Aurélien Poidevin, Quand l’Opéra entre en Résistance, Œil d’Or, 2007.
- Emmanuel Roblin, Un air de résistance à l’Opéra, documentary film, 2013
- Karine Le Bail, La musique au pas. Être musicien sous l'Occupation. CNRS Editions 2016
