= Pierné =

Pierné is a French surname. Notable people with the surname include:

- Gabriel Pierné (1863–1937), French composer, conductor, pianist and organist
- Paul Pierné (1874–1952), French composer and organist
