= Post-romanticism =

Cultural movement

Post-romanticism or Postromanticism refers to a range of cultural endeavors and attitudes emerging in the late nineteenth and early twentieth centuries, after the period of Romanticism.

== In literature ==
The period of post-romanticism in poetry is defined as the mid-to-late nineteenth century, but includes the much earlier poetry of Letitia Elizabeth Landon and Tennyson.

=== Notable post-romantic writers ===
- Herman Melville
- Thomas Carlyle
- Gustave Flaubert

== In music ==
Post-romanticism in music refers to composers who wrote classical symphonies, operas, and songs in transitional style that constituted a blend of late romantic and early modernist musical languages. Arthur Berger described the mysticism of La Jeune France as post-Romanticism rather than neo-Romanticism.

Post-romantic composers created music that used traditional forms combined with advanced harmony. Kaikhosru Shapurji Sorabji created post-romantic nocturnes that used unconventional harmonic language and Béla Bartók, for example, "in such Strauss-influenced works as Duke Bluebeard's Castle", may be described as having still used "dissonance ['such intervals as fourths and sevenths'] in traditional forms of music for purposes of post-romantic expression, not simply always as an appeal to the primal art of sound".

== Other notable post-romantic composers ==
- Richard Wagner
- Giacomo Puccini
- Richard Strauss
- Gustav Mahler
- Jean Sibelius
- Alexander Scriabin
- Sergei Rachmaninoff
- Modest Mussorgsky
- Kaikhosru Shapurji Sorabji

== See als ==
- Aestheticism
- Arts and Crafts movement
- Decadent movement
- Düsseldorf School
- Modernism
- Musical nationalism
- Neoclassicism
- Neoromanticism
- Pre-Raphaelite Brotherhood
- Symbolist Movement
- Vegetarianism and Romanticism
- Victorian literature
- Marxist-Leninist views on Romanticism
- Underground culture
