= Jacques Viret =

French musicologist

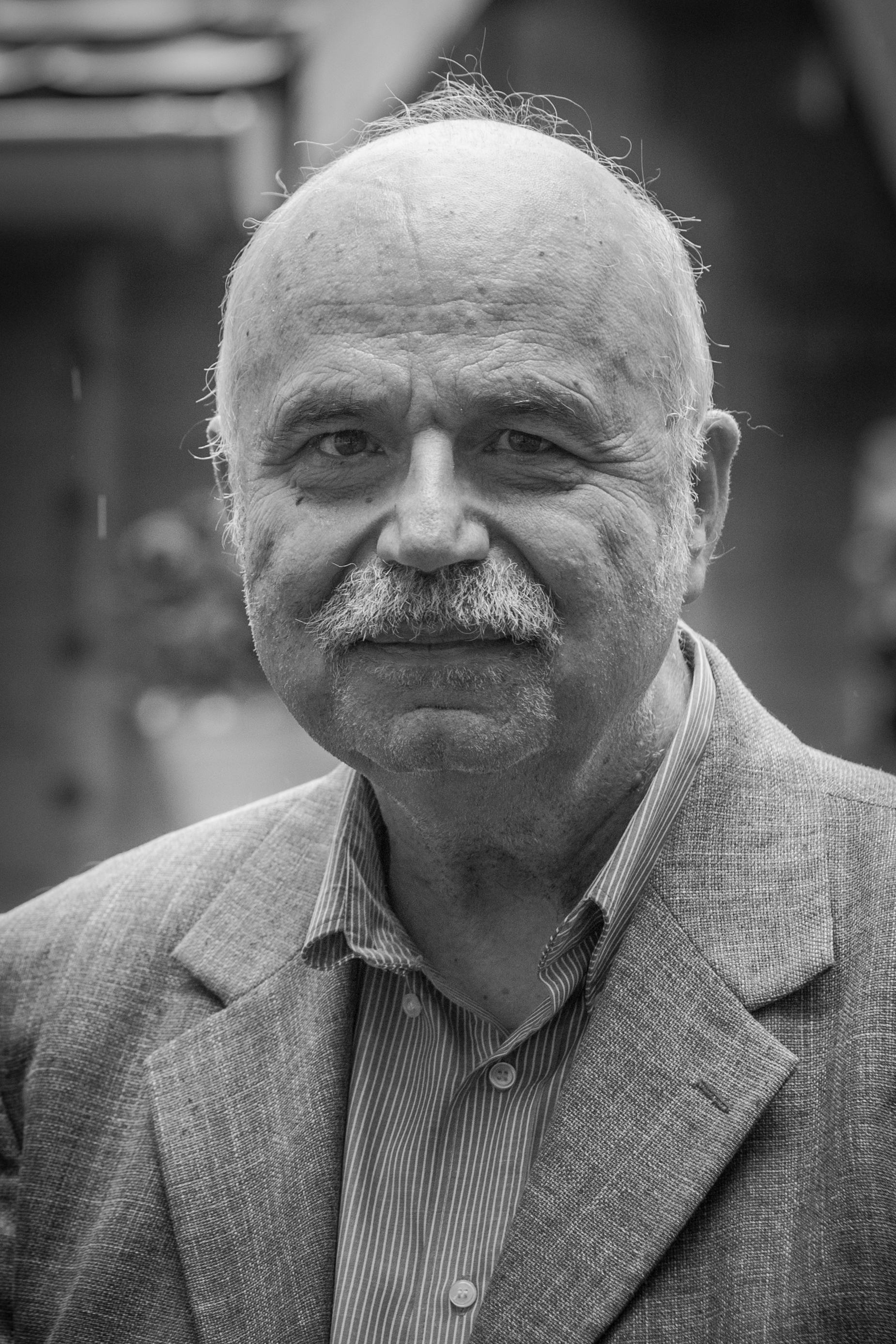
- Jacques Viret in May 2014
- Born: 19 October 1943 (age 82); Lausanne
- Occupations: Musicologist; Music educator

Jacques Viret (born 19 October 1943) is a contemporary French musicologist of Swiss origin.

== Life ==
Born in Lausanne, Viret is a pianist and organist, graduated in classic literature from the University of Lausanne, habilitated for the teaching of music theory (Société suisse de pédagogie musicale), Jacques Viret perfected his studies in musicology at the Paris-Sorbonne University, with Jacques Chailley who conducted his Ph.D. thesis on gregorian chant (1981). Since 1972, Jacques Viret has been teaching musicology at the university of Strasbourg, as an assistant and then lecturer and professor, emeritus since 2009.

== Gregorian chant and medieval music ==
The research and reflection of Jacques Viret refer essentially to the notion of tradition as defined by René Guénon in the line of the perennialism (or Gnosis): Not as the preservation of a fixed legacy, more or less ancient, but as the manifestation, diversified according to cultures, epochs and disciplines, of a "sacred, universal and timeless truth", a fruitful source of inspiration and creativity, in perpetual becoming and renewal. For music, Pythagoras remains, in this respect, a permanent reference. The series of harmonics thus appears, as an audible expression of numbers and proportions, as an image of the cosmic order. The universal creative principle is symbolized by the fundamental frequency in the har:monic order, by the tonic of the modes in the melodic order (all traditional music is of modal essence). In particular, the tonic sol, "sun" in Latin, the central element of the theological and esoteric cryptogram that Jacques Viret discovered in 1978 in the notes of the range (ut, ré, mi, taken from the hymn to Saint John the Baptist Ut queant laxis) and of which Jacques Chailley completed the explanation.

The official liturgical chant of the Roman Catholic Church, the Gregorian chant is especially the expression par excellence of tradition for the music of the West. Jacques Viret studies it in this light. He highlights, upstream, the rooting of this corpus in the other musical traditions of the world, especially oriental (and, probably, the ancient celtic music; Downstream, its importance as a breeding ground for European music, both scholarly and - in part - folkloric. This truly traditional approach illuminates Latin liturgical chant in its true light and allows the rediscovering, as far as possible, of its authentic interpretation (cf rhythm) before the year 1000, which is very different from the style instituted in the Nineteenth by the Benedictines of the Abbaye Saint-Pierre de Solesmes. Nevertheless, it benefits from the careful study of neumes by Dom Eugène Cardine and his pupils ("Gregorian semiotics", musical palaeography). It is a comparativism tributary to ethnomusicology, insofar as it relates to each other the writings of the Middle Ages (noted manuscripts, treaties) and the traditions currently alive. This approach is also illustrated by the work of Hungarian musicologist Benjámin Rajeczky, as well as by the interpretations of Marcel Pérès.

According to the same spirit, the series Diaphonia, created by Jacques Viret in 2000 with the "À Cœur Joie" publishing house in Lyon, provides amateur choristers with a repertoire of medieval songs transcribed in modern musical notation so as to restore all the finenesses of the original notations and add data which are not included therein and come from other sources.

== An integral science of music ==
The work of Jacques Viret is based on a rigorous investigation from sources, as required by scientific musicology. However, they broaden the historicist positivism and music analysis, where it is generally confined to two correlated movements: On the one hand, the musical philology of Jacques Chailley, which elucidates the general laws of musical languages and their perception; On the other hand, the new paradigm, which reconciles modernity and tradition, science and spirituality. Jacques Viret is today one of the very rare musicologists claiming the New Paradigm; In this capacity, he joined the team Contrelittérature by Alain Santacreu. His perspective, therefore, is defined as totalizing and holistic: the musical fact is considered not only from the objective and partial angle of ordinary musicology, but from that of the receptive or active subject (his consciousness), beyond the cleavage between the various types of music. Explanation and commentary then restore its legitimate primacy to sound in the face of writing, and closely link the musical meaning to the human being in its threefold constitution of body, soul, spirit. They restore, in a new form, the "musical science" of Pythagorean obedience cultivated in Ancient times and in the Middle Ages: highly rational on one side, in its mathematical slope; Irrationality of the other, in its sensitive, intuitive, even magical (ethos theory, derived from the primitive incantation). In the eyes of the thinkers of German Romanticism also - among others Schopenhauer, admired by Richard Wagner –, music is much better than an art of pleasure: language of the soul, interiority, revelation of the unspeakable, it opens an access to the "Soul of the world" (empathy, Einfühlung according to Herder, correspondances according to Baudelaire).

The anthropological humanist musicology, which is promoted by Jacques Viret, integrates the contributions of Carl Gustav Jung's psychology, Gestalt psychology, analytical psychology, transpersonal psychology, neuropsychology). It ramifies towards aesthetics, acoustics, hermeneutics, symbolism, metaphysics, sociology, music therapy, pedagogy, psycho - pedagogy, and rhetoric, and includes research on the interpretation (Aufführungspraxis) allowing to execute the old repertoires according to their authenticity. It revalues the orality as a living vehicle of traditional practices and knowledge, bearing precious values: vital, human, spiritual (cf. Marcel Jousse). This broad, open, spiritualist conception of musical science confers their originality to the works that Jacques Viret has published since 2004 at éditions Pardès, about gregorian chant, Medieval music, Richard Wagner, musicothérapy, Baroque music, and opera. Among the transverse problems that they expose, one will particularly mention that of singing in relation (vocal, rhythmic, emotional) with the speech, as the most direct expression of the feeling or musical instinct, and this, from the early childhood (spontaneous childish chantings where emerge elementary musical materials, melodic and rhythmic archetypes).

== Bibliography ==
- 1981: Aloÿs Fornerod, ou le musicien et le pays, Lausanne, Cahiers de la Renaissance Vaudoise
- 1986: Le Chant grégorien, musique de la parole sacrée, Lausanne, Éditions L'Âge d'Homme
- 1987: La Modalité grégorienne, un langage pour quel message ?, Lyon, À Cœur Joie, augmented reissue in 1996.
- 1988: Le Symbolisme de la gamme – L'hymne UT QUEANT LAXIS et ses quatre cryptogrammes (in collaboration with Jacques Chailley), Paris, in La Revue Musicale
- 1990–1992. La musique d'orgue du XVIe et son interprétation, five articles, L'Orgue francophone
- 1992: Regards sur la musique vocale de la Renaissance italienne, Lyon, À Cœur Joie
- 1993–1994: Aux sources de l’expression musicale : la créativité mélodique enfantine, three articles, L’Éducation musicale
- 2000: Les Premières Polyphonies, 800–1100, Lyon, À Cœur Joie, (Diaphonia 1)
- 2001: Le Chant grégorien et la tradition grégorienne, Lausanne, L'Âge d'Homme
- 2001: Approches herméneutiques de la musique (dir. J. Viret), Presses universitaires de Strasbourg
- 2001: L’École de Notre-Dame et ses conduits polyphoniques, Lyon, à Cœur Joie, (Diaphonia 2).
- 2004: B.A.-BA du chant grégorien, éditions Pardès
- 2005: B.A.-BA de la musique médiévale, éditions Pardès
- 2005: Le « Libre Vermell » de Montserrat, Lyon, À Cœur Joie, (Diaphonia 3).
- 2005: Métamorphoses de l’harmonie : la musique occidentale et la Tradition, in Les Pouvoirs de la musique, à l’écoute du sacré, dossier de la revue Connaissance des Religions, Paris, Éditions Dervy
- 2006: Qui suis-je ? Wagner, éditions Pardès, 2006.
- 2006: De la Musique et des Vaudois, itinéraire photographique 1905-2005, Lausanne, Bibliothèque Cantonale et Universitaire
- 2007: B.A.-BA de la musicothérapie, éditions Pardès
- 2008: B.A.-BA de la musique baroque, éditions Pardès
- 2009: B.A.-BA de l'opéra, éditions Pardès
- 2012: Le chant grégorien,Eyrolles, 206 p. (CD audio inserted: 75 min).
- 2012: Philologie musicale et modes grégoriens : de la théorie à l’instinct in Musurgia, vol. XIX/1-3 (hommage to Jacques Chailley), (pp. 103–121)
- 2017: Les deux chemins, Dialogue sur la musique, (in collaboration with Aurelio Porfiri), Hong Kong, Chorabooks
