= Pistone =

Pistone is an Italian surname. Notable people with the surname include:

- Alessandro Pistone (born 1975), Italian footballer
- Anita Pistone (born 1976), Italian sprinter
- Chase Pistone (1983–2026), American racing driver
- Danièle Pistone (born 1946), French musicologist and professor
- Joseph D. Pistone (born 1939), American FBI agent and writer
- Pete Pistone (born 1964), American motorsports journalist and commentator
- Tom Pistone (born 1929), American racing driver
