= Paul Kuentz =

French conductor (born 1930)

Paul Kuentz (4 May 1930 in Mulhouse, France) is a French conductor who studied at the Paris Conservatoire from 1947 to 1950, with Noël Gallon, Georges Hugon and Eugene Bigot.

== Career ==
He founded the Paul Kuentz Chamber Orchestra in 1951 and made many tours of Europe and the USA, performing the orchestral works of Bach at the Church of Saint-Séverin and at Carnegie Hall in 1968. He and his orchestra also completed two popular tours of Southern Africa. He frequently performs French music, including premieres of works by Pierre Max Dubois, Jacques Casterede and Jacques Charpentier. In 1956 he married Monique Frasca-Colombier. In 1972 he founded the Paul Kuentz Chorus.

== Recordings ==
Kuentz often recorded with other orchestras, or in rare instances with his own as well as another ensemble. His acclaimed 1995 recording of Carl Orff's Carmina Burana, for instance, employed both his own ensemble and the Orchestre des Concerts du Conservatoire. Kuentz's recent releases are reissues of older recordings and include the 2006 Deutsche Grammophon CD A Baroque Guitar Weekend.

Over the years Kuentz befriended and performed with some of the leading musicians of the day, including cellist/conductor Mstislav Rostropovich and harpist Nicanor Zabaleta, with whom he recorded a disc of Baroque harp concertos for Deutsche Grammophon in 1989. Among Kuentz's earlier recordings was his acclaimed two-CD set on Pierre Verany of the St. John Passion in 1987. Further successful Bach recordings followed, as well as a spate of others for various labels.

Recordings include: J.S. Bach's Orchestral Suites, Mass in B Minor (BWV 232) and Musikalisches Opfer; Antonio Vivaldi's Four Seasons, and other concertos; Flute concertos by Haydn, Blavet, Mozart, Leclair and Giovanni Battista Pergolesi; Music by Michel-Richard Delalande, Jean-Joseph Mouret, Gabrieli and Gluck; Mozart's Concerto K 299, Requiem, Bastien und Bastienne and Church Sonatas; Harp concertos by Georg Frideric Handel, Johann Georg Albrechtsberger, Boieldieu, Wagenseil and Carl Ditters von Dittersdorf; Joseph Haydn's Symphonies Nos. 85 and 101 (EMI); Other labels include Decca and Deutsche Grammophon.

- Nicanor Zabaleta, Harfe (Harp). Ravel, Debussy, Handel, Albrechtsberger. Paul Kuentz Chamber Orchestra. DGG LP139 304. 1967.
- Mozart Litanie, K. 339 was recorded with the Paul Kuentz Orchestra accompanying the Hamilton College Choir (privately issued lp) c. early 1970s.
- In June 1990, he performed Mozart's Requiem and Krönungsmesse (Coronation Mass) at the Saint-Etienne du Mont church, in Paris, which was recorded in video.
