= Georges Caussade =

French composer, music theorist and music educator

Georges Paul Alphonse Emilien Caussade (20 November 1873 – 5 August 1936) was a French composer, music theorist, and music educator.

== Biography ==
Born in Port Louis, Mauritius, he joined the faculty of the Conservatoire de Paris in 1905 as a teacher of counterpoint. He began teaching fugue at the school as well in 1921; a position his wife, composer Simone Plé-Caussade, took over in 1928.

Among his notable students were members of Les Six, such as Georges Auric and Germaine Tailleferre. Other students included Jehan Alain, Elsa Barraine, Lili Boulanger, Jean-Yves Daniel-Lesur, Georges Dandelot, Claude Delvincourt, Léon Destroismaisons, Georges Hugon, Jeanne Leleu, Eugène Lapierre, Gaston Litaize, Paul Pierné, Georges-Émile Tanguay, Henri Tomasi, Marcel Tournier, and Marios Varvoglis.

In 1931 he published a book on the subject of harmony, Technique de l'harmonie. His most notable compositions are the operas Selgar et Moina and Légende de Saint George.

Caussade died aged 62 in Chanteloup-les-Vignes.

== See also ==
- See: List of music students by teacher: C to F#Georges Caussade.
