= La Jeune France =

Name of two French societies in 1930s and 1940s

La Jeune France ("Young France") was the name of two related French societies in the 1930s and 1940s.

== Musical organization ==
La Jeune France was founded in 1936 by André Jolivet along with composers Olivier Messiaen, Daniel Lesur and Yves Baudrier, who were attempting to re-establish a more human and less abstract form of composition. Their first concert took place on 3 June 1936, conducted by Roger Désormière. It developed from the avant-garde chamber music society La Spirale, formed by Jolivet, Messiaen, and Lesur the previous year. The name originated with Hector Berlioz. La Jeune France composers are associated with mysticism. However, Virgil Thomson describes the group as neo-impressionist rather than post- or neo-romantic:

An addiction to religious subject matter, common all over post-war Europe, is no more significant in Messiaen than is orientalism with Jolivet or the classical humanism of Rosenthal (and Malipiero).

== Political organization ==
The cultural/political organization Jeune France was founded by composer Pierre Schaeffer as part of the Révolution nationale initiative of the Vichy regime. It was launched on 15 August 1940 and named after the music society (after asking permission to use the title).

Its goal was a French cultural renewal in the context of German occupation, through developing youth-oriented cultural and artistic events like theatrical performances, concerts, and exhibitions. Another aim was to employ unemployed artists. It also sponsored the creation of the short-lived artistic commune in Oppède (near Marseille) founded in 1940 by Bernard Zehrfuss.

The organization was chaired by pianist Alfred Cortot. The philosopher Emmanuel Mounier served as its cultural advisor. The dramatic performers involved included Jean Vilar, Raymond Rouleau, Pierre Fresnay, Pierre Renoir, along with visual artists like Jean René Bazaine, Jean Bertholle, Jean Le Moal, and Alfred Manessier, the architect Auguste Perret, among others.

The Vichy regime dissolved the organization in March 1942.
