= Wagenseil =

Wagenseil is a surname that may refer to:

- Christian Jacob Wagenseil (1756–1839), German writer
- Georg Christoph Wagenseil (1715–1777), 18th-century Austrian composer
- Jessica Wagenseil, American biomechanical engineer
- Johann Christoph Wagenseil (1633–1705), 17th-18th century German Christian scholar of Hebrew
- Kurt Wagenseil (1904–1988), German translator
