= Cecile Paul Simon =

French composer

Cecile Paul Simon (April 12, 1881 – January 3, 1970) was a French composer who published under male pseudonyms and was the mother of composer Claude Arrieu.

Simon was born in Neuilly-sur-Seine, a daughter of the philanthropist Clarisse Simon. She studied music with Théodore Dubois, Paul Vidal, and Charles Tournemire. She married Paul Simon and their daughter Louise Marie (composer Claude Arrieu) was born in 1903. Simon wrote songs, chamber music, orchestral works, film music, and several operas. Simon published as early as at seventeen, under the names C.P., C. Navil, and other male pseudonyms, such as Guy Portal or Jean Rovens.

Some of Simon's compositions were published by Durdilly and Rouart.

== Chamber ==
- Sonata (violin and piano)
- Sonata No. 2 (flute or violin and piano)
- Trio (violin, cello and piano)

== Orchestra ==
- Etude Symphonique
- Poeme

== Theatre ==
- Fleur de Peche (text by L. Payen)
- L'aumone de Don Juan
- La Belle au Bois Dormant
- Marchand de Regrets (text by Fernand Crommelynck)

== Vocal ==
- "L'heure Exquise" (text by Paul Verlaine)
- "Simple Tale" (medium voice and orchestra or piano; text by Jean Cocteau)
- "Valses" (text by Janine Lirret pseud. Raymonde Terrail)
