= Claude Arrieu =

French composer (1903–1990)

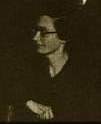
- Born: Louise-Marie Simon; November 30, 1903; Paris, France
- Died: March 7, 1990 (aged 86); Paris, France

Louise-Marie Simon (30 November 1903 – 7 March 1990), professionally known as Claude Arrieu, was a French composer, pedagogue, and music producer.

Arrieu wrote more than 200 works in various formats, including both sacred and secular music, range from solo pieces, chamber and vocal music, and instrumental works to opera and incidental music, for stage productions and film scores. She was also a teacher and worked as a producer and assistant head of sound effects at Radio France.

== Early life and education ==
Born in Paris, Arrieu was the daughter of composer Cécile-Paul Simon. Arrieu was classically trained from an early age and became particularly interested in works by Bach and Mozart, and later, Igor Stravinsky. However, her contemporaries, such as Gabriel Fauré, Claude Debussy, and Maurice Ravel provided her the most inspiration.

She entered the Conservatoire de Paris in 1924. She became a piano student of Marguerite Long and took classes from Georges Caussade, Noël Gallon, Jean Roger-Ducasse, and Paul Dukas. In 1932, she received the first prize in composition from the Conservatoire. She also became friends with Olivier Messiaen, who considered her a part of a core group of composers alongside himself, Elsa Barraine, and Jean Cartan, all students of Dukas.

== Career ==
In 1935, Arrieu joined the Service des programmes de la Radiodiffusion française, where she remained employed until 1947. She participated in the development of a wide range of programming, including Pierre Schaeffer's experimental radio series, La Coquille à planètes (1943–1944) and

In 1949, Arrieu won the RAI's Prix Italia for her score for Frédéric Général.

She wrote music in all styles, composing works of absolute music as well as music for theatre, film, radio, and music hall. Wise Music Classical describes her music as exhibiting "a sound with ease of flow and elegance of structure" and "vivacity, clarity of expression and a natural feel for melody."

Arrieu composed concertos for piano (1932), two pianos (1934), violin (1938 and 1949), flute (1946), and trumpet and strings (1965). She also wrote Petite suite en cinq parties (1945), Concerto for wind quintet and strings (1962), Suite funambulesque ("Tightrope Walker's Suite") (1961), and Variations for classical strings (1970).

Among her chamber music compositions are her Trio for woodwinds (1936), Sonatina for two violins (1937), and Clarinet quartet (1964). Her Sonatine for flute and piano (1946) was first performed for the radio in 1944 by flutist Jean-Pierre Rampal and pianist H. Moyens.

Arrieu set many poems to music, including those by Joachim du Bellay, Louise Lévêque de Vilmorin, Louis Aragon, Jean Cocteau, Jean Tardieu, Stéphane Mallarmé, and Paul Éluard. Examples include Chansons bas for voice and piano, based on poems by Mallarmé (1937); Candide, radio music on texts by Jean Tardieu based on Voltaire; and À la Libération, cantata of seven poems on love in war, on poems by Paul Éluard.

Her first opéra bouffe, Cadet Roussel with a libretto by André de la Tourasse after Jean Limozin, was presented at the Opéra de Marseille on 2 October 1953. In 1960, La Princesse de Babylone, an opéra bouffe after the work of Voltaire adapted by Pierre Dominica, was praised for its lyrical originality and spectacle.

Her noteworthy film scores include: Les Gueux au paradis (1946), Crèvecoeur (1955), Niok l'éléphant (1957), Marchands de rien (1958), Le Tombeur (1958), and Julie Charles (for television, 1974).

== Death ==
She died in Paris on March 7, 1990.

== Notable compositions ==
Trio en Ut / Reed Trio (1936)

1. Allegretto ritmico. 2. Pastorale et Scherzo. 3. Allegrement. 9 mins. Oboe, clarinet, bassoon.

Arrieu was thirty-three when she wrote this reed trio. The work was commissioned by the ensemble, Trio D’Anches de Paris. The opening Allegretto ritmico is a pseudo-march, with contrasting episodes. The Pastorale et Scherzo is tender and swaying, sometimes faster, and includes its own middle section. The Allègrement has a more militaristic sound. It's one of two works she composed for reed trio, the other being Suite en Trio (1980).

Recorded by the Ambache ensemble on Liberté, Egalité, Sororité.

Dixtuor pour Instruments à Vent / Wind Dixtuor, 1967 (rev. 1989)

1. Allegretto moderato. 2. Moderato - Allegro scherzando - Andante - Tempo primo. 3. Andante - Allegro scherzando. 4. Cantabile 5. Allegro Risoluto 2 flutes, oboe, 2 clarinets, 2 bassoons, horn, trumpet, trombone.

Arrieu’s Dixtuor pour Instruments à Vent is possibly the only published piece written for this combination of instruments. Composed in 1967, the work exhibits a structure typical of Parisian neoclassicism.

== List of works ==
Opera

- Noé, 1931–1934 (imagerie musicale, 3 acts, A. Obey), f.p. Strasbourg Opéra, 29 January 1950
- Cadet Roussel, 1938–1939 (opéra bouffe, 5 acts, André de la Tourasse after Jean Limozin), f.p. Marseilles, Opéra, 2 October 1953
- La Coquille à planètes (opéra radiophonique, Pierre Schaeffer), RTF (Radiodiffusion-Télévision Française), 1944
- Le deux rendez-vous, 1948 (opéra comique, P. Bertin after G. de Nerval), RTF, 22 June 1951
- Le chapeau à musique (opéra enfantine, 2 acts, Tourasse and P. Dumaine), RTF, 1953
- La princesse de Babylone, 1953–1955 (opéra bouffe, 3 acts, P. Dominique, after Voltaire), Rheims, Opéra, 3 March 1960
- La cabine téléphonique (opéra bouffe, 1 act, M. Vaucaire), RTF, 15 March 1959
- Cymbeline, 1958–1963 (2 acts, J. Tournier and M. Jacquemont, after Shakespeare), ORTF, 31 March 1974
- Balthazar, ou Le mort–vivant, 1966 (opéra bouffe, 1 act, Dominique), Unperformed
- Un clavier pour un autre (opéra bouffe, 1 act, J. Tardieu), Avignon, Opéra, 3 April 1971
- Barbarine, 1972 (3 acts, after A. de Musset), incomplete
- Les amours de Don Perlimpin et Belise en son jardin (imaginaire lyrique, 4 tableaux, after F. Garcia Lorca), Tours, Grand Théâtre, 1 March 1980

Chamber music

- Cinq movements, 1964 (clarinet quartet: E-flat, two B-flat, and bass), premiered by the Belgian Clarinet Quartet in Aix-la-Chapelle, Germany
- Concerto en ut, 1938 (2 pianos and orchestra)
- Deux pieces, 1966 (string quintet, harp, horn, and percussion), premiered at ORTF under the direction of Freddy Alberti
- Fantaisie lyrique, 1959 (ondes Martenot and piano), contest piece for the Paris Conservatory
- Impromptu II, 1985 (oboe and piano)
- Passe-pied, 1966 (cello and piano)
- Quintette en ut, 1952 (wind quintet), premiered by the French Wind Quintet in Sarrebrück, Germany, 1952
- Suite en trio, 1955 (bamboo pipes: soprano, alto in A or G, and bass)
- Suite en trio, 1980 (flute, oboe, clarinet)
- Suite en quatre, 1980 (flute, oboe, clarinet, and bassoon), premiered by the Soni Ventorum Ensemble in Washington, U.S., 19 January 1980
- Trio en Ut, por Hautbois, Clarinette et Bassoon (oboe, clarinet, bassoon)

Vocal music

- A traduire en esthionen, 1947 (René Chalupt)
- Ah! Si j'étais un oiseau, 1946 (choir: three equal parts, Samivel)
- Attributs, 1947 (René Chalupt)
- Chanson de Marianne, 1947 (soprano and/or baritone and piano, Max Jacob)
- Dix Chansons: Folklore de France, 1957 (unison choir, flute, oboe, clarinet, percussion, and strings)
- Rondeaux de Clément Marot, 1950 (choir: three equal parts)
- Rue des Ormeaux, 1953 (music for radio, Claude Roy)

Teaching pieces

- Caprice, 1976 (B-flat or C trumpet and piano)
- Cerf-volant, 1976 (piano)
- Conte d'hiver, 1976 (bass trombone and piano)
- Escapade, 1976 (piano)
- Intermède, 1966 (B-flat or C trumpet and piano)
- Introduction, scherzo et choral, 1986 (tenor trombone and piano)
- La fête, 1976 (clarinet and piano)
- La poupée casée, 1976 (piano)
- Le cœur volant, 1976 (horn and piano)
- Lectures pour piano, 1968 (piano)
  - Volume 1: I. Nonchalance, II. L'hiver est fini, III. Bavardes, IV. Carnet de bal
  - Volume 2: V. Ingénue, VI. Capricieuse, VII. Malicieuse, VIII. Péronelle
- L'enfant sage, 1976 (piano)
- L'étourdi, 1979 (B-flat or C trumpet and piano)
- Manu militari, 1979 (B-flat or C trumpet and piano)
- Ménétrier, 1965 (B-flat or C trumpet or cornet and piano)
- Nocturne, 1976 (oboe and piano)
- Nostalgie, 1980 (flute and piano)
- Pauvre Pierre, 1976 (flute and piano)
- Petit choral, 1980 (clarinet and piano)
- Petit récit, 1976 (piano)
- Prélude pastoral, 1976 (piano)
- Promenade mélancolique, 1976 (piano)
- Questionnaire, 1976 (piano)
- Retour au village, 1986 (B-flat or C trumpet and piano)
- Rêverie, 1979 (B-flat or C trumpet and piano)
- Sonatine for flute and piano 1946 (flute and piano) premiered in 1944 by Jean-Pierre Rampal accompanied by Herman Moyens
- Six-huit, 1965 (Bb or C trumpet and piano)
- Trois duos faciles, 1977 (two flutes)
- Trois duos faciles, 1977 (flute and bassoon)
- Trois duos faciles, 1977 (two oboes)
- Un jour d'été, 1976 (clarinet and piano)
- Valse, 1948 (piano)
- Voyage en hiver, 1976 (flute and piano)

== General references ==
- Sadie, Stanley (Ed.) [1992] (1994). The New Grove Dictionary of Opera, vol. 1, A-D, chpt: "Arrieu, Claude" by Richard Langham Smith, New York: MacMillan. ISBN 0-935859-92-6.
- Editions Billaudot: Claude Arrieu
