= Galerie Charpentier =

The Galerie Charpentier was a gallery of historic and contemporary art in Paris, located at 76, rue du Faubourg-Saint-Honoré, at the corner with rue Duras.

== History ==
In 1802, the Comte d'Orglandes had a mansion built at 76 rue du Faubourg-Saint-Honoré in the 8th arrondissement of Paris, at the corner of rue Duras (almost opposite the Élysée Palace). In 1821, he sold it to Colonel d'Andlau d'Orvillers. On an unknown date, the hotel became the property of the Mouthier-Dehayin family. The collector Jean Charpentier succeeded this family and, little by little, the public was allowed to visit the collections in a gallery set up in the main courtyard. From 1924, an exhibition on Géricault was organized there by Jean Charpentier.

After the dissolution of the Galeries Georges Petit company in 1933, prestige auctions took place “in the Hôtel de Jean Charpentier”. Other exhibitions were organized in these places as "Réalités Nouvelles" in 1939. In 1941, a posthumous exhibition of the works of Émile Bernard was offered to the Parisian public. In 1948, Raymond Nacenta became the owner of the gallery, and new exhibitions and memorable auctions were organized there. According to Myriam Chimènes and Yannick Simon, it was in 1941 that "Raymond Nasenta" owned this gallery, in which the first five concerts of the Pléiade were held, from February to June 1943.

At the beginning of the 1960s, the city of Paris granted Parisian auctioneers advantageous conditions for the rental of the Palais Gallièra, which became the fashionable place for prestigious auctions of works of art. Subsequently, the former premises of the Charpentier gallery were the Parisian headquarters of the Fives-Lille company, which demonstrated its mastery of the use of steel by installing particularly standardized offices in place of the gallery.

At the end of the 1980s, the rooms on rue du Faubourg were rented to Pierre Cardin, who set up a restaurant there.

Established in Paris since 1967, the auction house Sotheby's chose this building in 1988 to set up its Parisian offices.
