= Paul-Marie Masson =

French musicologist and composer (1882–1954)

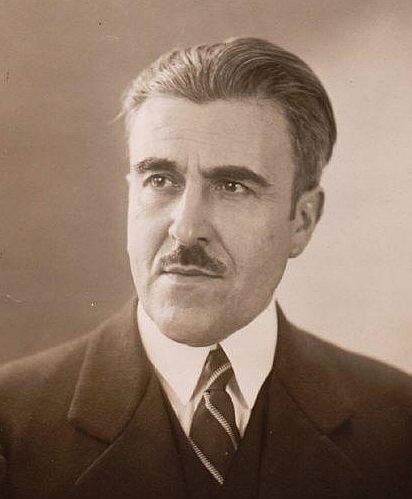
- Paul-Marie Masson
- Born: 9 September 1882; Sète
- Died: 27 January 1954 (aged 71); Paris
- Occupations: Musicologist; Composer

Paul-Marie Masson (9 September 1882 – 27 January 1954) was a French musicologist, music teacher and composer.

A specialist of the lyrical work of Jean-Philippe Rameau, in 1930 he published his thesis on L’Opéra de Rameau, which is still a reference work.

Masson has been president of the French association of musicologists Société française de musicologie (1944-1947).
