= Jessica Wagenseil =

American biomechanical engineer

Jessica E. Wagenseil is an American biomechanical engineer whose research concerns the mechanical properties of the human blood system and the interaction of those properties with cardiovascular disease. She is a professor of mechanical engineering & materials science and vice dean for faculty advancement in the McKelvey School of Engineering at Washington University in St. Louis.

== Education and career ==
Wagenseil received her bachelor's degree in 1997 at the University of California, San Diego, where she studied bioengineering. She went to Washington University in St. Louis for graduate study, receiving a master's degree in 2003 and completing her doctorate (D.Sc.) in 2008.

After postdoctoral research at Washington University she became a faculty member at Saint Louis University before returning to Washington University in 2013 as an associate professor. She was named as vice dean for faculty advancement in 2021.

== Recognition ==
Wagenseil was elected to the College of Fellows of the American Institute for Medical and Biological Engineering (AIMBE) in the 2023 class of fellows, "for fundamental contributions to our understanding of how large, elastic arteries remodel and adapt during development and disease". She is also an ASME Fellow, elected in 2024.
