= Marcel Jousse =

French Jesuit and anthropologist

Marcel Jousse (28 July 1886 – 14 August 1961) was a French Jesuit and anthropologist. He was the founder of the Anthropology of Gesture.
