= Jeanne Leleu =

French pianist and composer

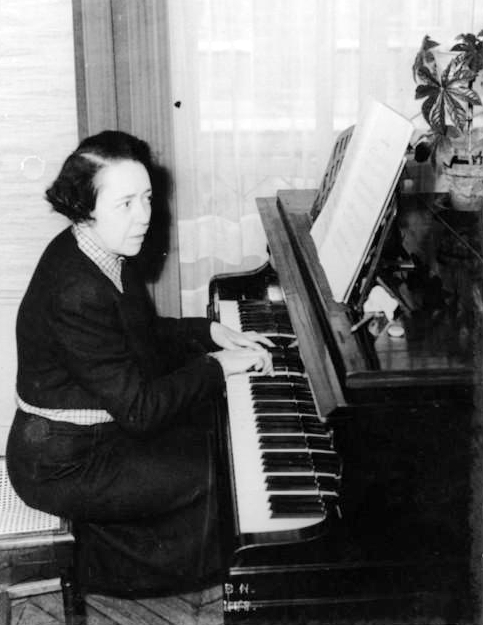
Jeanne Leleu

Jeanne Leleu (29 December 1898 – 11 March 1979) was a French pianist and composer. She was born in Saint-Mihiel in northeastern France; her father was a bandmaster and her mother a piano teacher. She entered the Conservatoire de Paris at the age of nine, where she studied with Marguerite Long, Georges Caussade, Alfred Cortot and Charles-Marie Widor. With Geneviève Durony, Leleu gave the premiere performance of Ravel's Ma mère l'oye in 1910. Ravel composed his Prélude for a Paris Conservatoire sight-reading competition in 1913 and Leleu won the prize.

Her cantata Beatrix won the Prix de Rome in 1923. (She was only the third woman to win this premier Grand Prize after Lili Boulanger and Marguerite Canal.) She went on to win two other prizes: Georges Bizet and Monbinne.

In 1924 she took a position at the French Academy in Rome in the Villa Medici, staying there for three years before returning to Paris.

After completing her studies, Leleu took a position as professor of sight-reading at the Conservatoire and, in 1947, she was named professor of harmony. She died in Paris at 80 years of age.

== Works ==
Leleu was known for symphonic and piano works and ballets. Her printed compositions were published in Paris. Selected works include:

- Quatuor pour piano et cordes (1922)
- Beatrix, cantata (1923) (Winner of the Grand Prize of Rome)
- Esquisses italiennes (1926)
- Suite symphonique (1926)
- Deux danses, (1927)
- Le Cyclope d'Euridipe (1928)
- Transparences, symphony (1931)
- Concerto pour piano (1935)
- Un jour d'été, ballet (1940)
- Nantéos, ballet (1947)
- Femmes, suite (1947)
- Virevoltes, suite (1950)
