= Danièle Pistone =

French musicologist (born 1946)

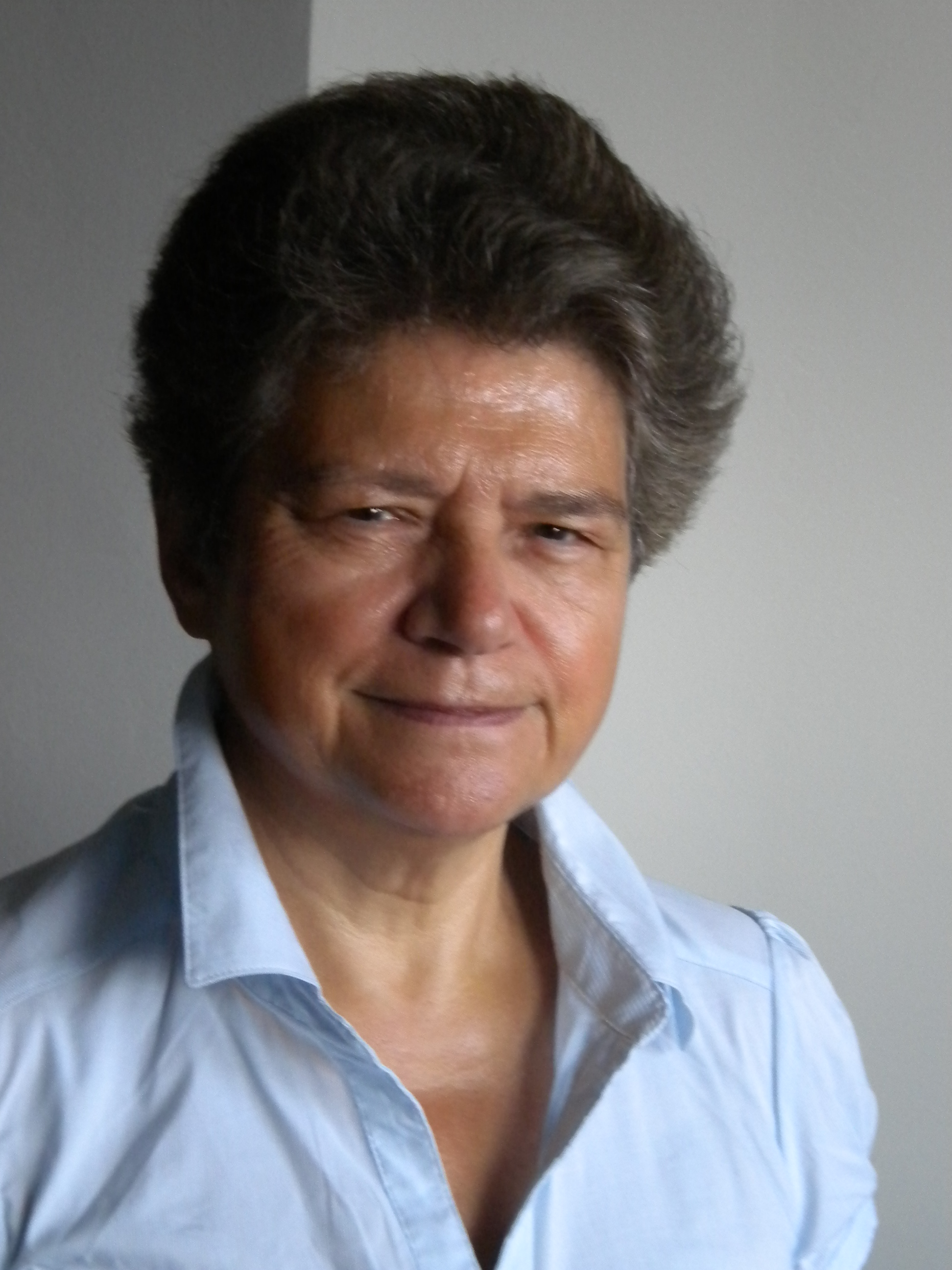
Danièle Pistone

Danièle Pistone (born 1 December 1946) is a French musicologist, emeritus professor at the University Paris Sorbonne 4.

== Biography ==
In addition to her musical studies (including piano and conducting at the conservatoire à rayonnement régional de Besançon and the Schola Cantorum de Paris, Pistone graduated from the university with a degree in literature and Italian, and in 1973 she received a doctorate with a thesis on the piano in French literature.

Since 1971, she has been teaching at the University of Paris-Sorbonne where she was appointed professor of history of music in 1981.

A producer at TF1 and Radio France (France Culture and France Musiques, 1972–1981), she also established the series "Musique-Musicologie" at the Honoré Champion publishing house in 1975, the Revue internationale de musique française (Slatkine-Champion, 1980–1997), the "Séminaire Interarts de Paris" (1998) and the Observatoire musical français of the University Paris-Sorbonne (1989–2014), as well as the eponymous publishing house (1991–2015).

She has been an adviser for artistic training and cultural projects to the Scientific and Technical Mission of the Ministry of Research and has represented Higher Education at the Interdepartmental Mission for the Development of Arts Education (1994–1998).

In 2004, she was elected a correspondent at the Académie des beaux-arts.

== Publications ==
=== As author ===
- 1973: Le piano dans la littérature française des origines jusqu'en 1900, Lille, Atelier de reproduction des thèses, 1975 (diffusion Honoré Champion) ISBN 2-252-01690-6. Thèse d'État under the direction of Jacques Chailley (Paris 4).
- 1979: La musique en France de la Révolution à 1900, Éditions Honoré Champion
- 1980: Wagner et Paris, RIMF, Slatkine-Champion
- 1984: Les musiciens français à Rome, RIMF, Slatkine-Champion
- 1986: L'opéra italien au XIXe siècle, de Rossini à Puccini, Honoré Champion, translated into English (Cambridge, Amadeus Press) and Portuguese (Lisboa, Caminho)
- 1986: Manifeste et musique en France, RIMF, Slatkine-Champion
- 1989: Musique en pensées, Honoré Champion
- 1994: Symbolisme et musique en France, RIMF, Slatkine-Champion
- 2004: La musique dans la société: deux siècles de recherches, L'Harmattan, 2004
- 2009: Les suppléments de 'Musica', 1902-1914, OMF Editions of the Observatoire musical français
- 2011: Périodiques français relatifs à la musique: répertoire alphabétique et chronologique indexé (1690–2011), OMF
- 2013: Répertoire des thèses françaises relatives à la musique (1810–2011), Honoré Champion
- 2013: Un demi-siècle d'œuvres pianistiques éditées en France (1830–1880), OMF
- 2015: 25 ans de créations opératiques en France (1990–2015), OMF
- 2015: Notes sur la vie musicale des années 1990 d'après six magazines français indexés, OMF

=== As co-author ===
- Le commentaire musicologique du grégorien à 1700, Honoré Champion (1/1976, 3/1985) (with Serge Gut)
- Les partitions d'orchestre de Haydn à Stravinsky. Histoire, lecture, réduction, commentaire, Honoré Champion, 1/1977, 2/1982 (with S. Gut)
- La musique de chambre en France de 1870 à 1918, Honoré Champion (1/1978, 2/1986) (with S. Gut)
- Le chant grégorien. Historique et pratique, Honoré Champion (1/1981, 5/1993) (with A. Madrignac)
- 1982: Musique et musicologie dans les universités françaises, Honoré Champion (with M. Delahaye)
- 2001: Johann Svendsen. Karneval in Paris, F. Noetzel (with H. Herrestahl)
- 2003: Mémoires de Maîtrise des universités françaises, OMF, (with N. Cousin)
- 2003: Berlioz, hier et aujourd’hui, L’Harmattan, (with C. Rudent)

=== As editor or co-editor ===
- 1976: Ravel au XXe siècle, CNRS
- 1983: L'éducation musicale en France, PUPS
- 1984: Sur les traces de Frédéric Chopin, Honoré Champion
- 1987: Le théâtre lyrique français contemporain, Honoré Champion
- 1990: L'interprétation de Chopin en France, Honoré Champion
- 1991: La musique à l'université. Bilans et perspectives, OMF
- 1994: Analyse musicale et perception, OMF (with J.-P. Mialaret)
- 1996: Musique et style. Méthodes et concepts, OMF
- 1996: Grieg et Paris: romantisme, symbolisme et modernisme musical franco-norvégien, Presse de l'Université de Caen (with H. Herresthal)
- 1999: Musiques d’Orphée, PUF (with P. Brunel)
- 1999: Pianistes virtuoses à Paris autour de Frédéric Chopin, Warsow (with I. Poniatowska)
- 2000: Musiques et musiciens à Paris dans les années trente, Honoré Champion
- 2000: Musique et linguistique de spécialité, OMF
- 2001: Littérature et musique dans la France du XXe siècle, Presses Universitaires de Strasbourg (with J.-L. Backès et Cl. Coste)
- 2002: La musique et l’imaginaire, OMF
- 2003: Les pratiques de concert, OMF (with J.-P. Mialaret)
- 2004: Analyse et contextualisation, OMF (with M. Battier)
- 2005: Polytonalité/Polymodalité, Histoire et actualité, OMF (with M. Fischer)
- 2006: L'universel et l'utopique. Hommage à François-Bernard Mâche, OMF
- 2006: Héros et héroïnes de l'opéra symboliste, OMF
- 2007: Opéra italien et dramaturgie, OMF (with A. Guarnieri)
- 2007: Pianos et pianistes dans la France d’aujourd’hui, OMF
- 2007: Pianistes du XXe siècle : critique, pédagogie, interprétation, OMF
- 2008: Autour du clavecin moderne : hommage à Elisabeth Chojnacka, OMF
- 2008: Le commentaire auditif de spécialité, OMF
- 2008: Des Ballets russes aux Ballets suédois : quelques aspects de la vie musicale parisienne, 1909–1929, OMF
- 2009: Musicologies d’aujourd’hui , OMF
- 2009: Corpus et typologies, OMF, (with J. Pimentel)
- 2010: La musique au temps des arts, PUPS, (with G. Denizeau)
- 2011: Recherches sur la presse musicale française, OMF
- 2011: La voix parlée et chantée, 1890-1903: étude et indexation d’un périodique français, OMF
- 2012: Villa-Lobos, des sources de l’œuvre aux échos contemporains, Honoré Champion, (with L. F. de Alencastro, A. Fléchet and J. Pimentel)
- 2012: Paroles et musiques, L’Harmattan, (with C. Naugrette)
- 2013: Le piano dans la France du Second Empire, OMF
- 2013: Musique, analogie, symbole : l’exemple des musiques de l’eau, OMF
- 2014: Fascinantes étrangetés, La découverte de l’altérité musicale en Europe au XIXe siècle, L'Harmattan (with L. Charles-Dominique and Y. Defrance).
- 2014: Piano français des années 1870, OMF
- 2015: La musique à Paris en 1880, OMF
- 2015: Regards sur la presse musicale française, XIXe-XXIe s, OMF
- 2016: Le wagnérisme dans tous ses états, 1913-2013, Presses Sorbonne Nouvelle, (with C. Leblanc)
