= Claude Delvincourt =

French composer (1888–1954)

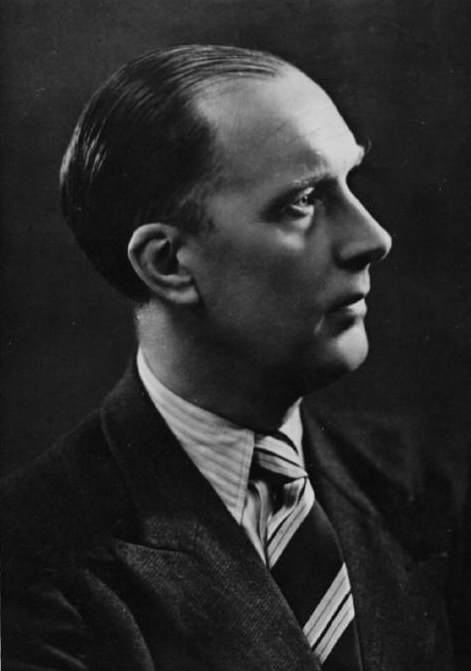

Background information
- Born: 12 January 1888; Paris, France
- Died: 5 April 1954 (aged 66) Orbetello, Italy
- Occupations: pianist, composer

Claude Étienne Edmond Marie Pierre Delvincourt (12 January 1888 – 5 April 1954) was a French pianist and composer of classical music.

== Biography ==
Delvincourt was born in Paris, the son of Pierre Delvincourt and Marguerite Fourès.

He studied at the Conservatoire de Paris, first under Léon Boëllmann, then under the centenarian Henri Büsser. Also, he was taught counterpoint and fugue by Georges Caussade and composition by Charles-Marie Widor. A Prix de Rome winner in 1911 and again in 1913 (on the latter occasion he shared the award with Lili Boulanger), he was appointed Director of Conservatoire at Versailles in 1932 and Director of the Paris Conservatoire in 1940, following the resignation of Henri Rabaud.

During the German occupation of France, Delvincourt was forced to apply the racial laws of the Vichy government to the Paris Conservatoire, excluding Jewish professors and students. But he managed, with the help of his former teacher's niece Marie-Louise Boëllmann, to prevent numerous students from being compelled to join the STO (law of 16 February 1943). He gathered the young musicians in the Orchestre des Cadets du Conservatoire and convinced the German authorities that they were doing their duties by this method. Meanwhile, Delvincourt joined the Front National des Musiciens. Furthermore, he "did all he could to protect his flock, never asking for papers and always trying to hide illegal students.", succeeded in saving many students and was threatened by the Gestapo. He was forced to disappear until the end of the military occupation.

He died, still Conservatoire director, on April 5, 1954, from injuries he incurred in a car accident on a road in Orbetello, Italy. The great organist Marcel Dupré succeeded him in the directorship.

== Principal works ==
=== Orchestral works ===
- Serenade or Radio-Serenade, suite for orchestra (1914)
- Typhaon, symphonic poem (1914)
- L'offrande à Siva, choreographic poem for Large orchestra (1921)
- Boccacerie, portraits for the "Decameron", version for orchestra (1924)
- Croquembouches, Two pieces for piano and orchestra (1926)
- Bal vénitien, suite for orchestra (1927)
- Choreographic Prelude for orchestra (1931)
- Ce Monde de rosée, version for orchestra (1934)
- Film d'Asie, suite for orchestra (1937) after the documentary "La Croisière Jaune" (1934)
- Pamir, suite for Large orchestra (1938)
- Piano Concerto, unfinished (1954)

=== Chamber music ===
- Quintet for piano and string quartet (1907)
- Trio for piano, violin and cello (1909)
- Sonata for violin and piano (1922)
- Croquembouches for saxophone and piano (1929)
- Danceries, Five pieces for violin and piano (1930)
- Contemplation for violin and piano (1935)
- String Quartet (posthume) for Two violins, viola and cello (1954)

=== Works for solo instruments ===
- Five Pieces for piano (1923)
- Boccacerie, Five portraits for the "Decameron", for piano (also version for orchestra) (1926)
- Croquembouches, Twelve pieces for piano (1926)
- Bal vénitien, suite for orchestra, reduction for two pianos (1927)
- Heures juvéniles, Twelve pieces for piano (1928)
- Images pour les contes du temps passé, for Four-hand piano (1935)
- Three Pieces for organ (Marche d'église - Méditation - Sortie de fête) (1937)

=== Vocal and choral works ===
- Thestylis, for soprano and orchestra, after Leconte de Lisle poem (1908)
- Hodie Christus natus, for choir, oboe, bassoon and organ (1909)
- Aurore, choir for female voices and orchestra (or piano), after Victor Hugo poem (1910)
- Acis et Galathée, cantata; poem by Eugène Adenis (1910)
- Nuit tombante, for mixed choir and orchestra (or piano), after Victor Hugo poem (1911)
- Yanitza, cantata (1911)
- La Source, choir for female voices and orchestra (or piano) (1912)
- Fulvia, cantata (1912)
- Berceuse, melody for voice and piano, after Maurice d'Assier poem (1912)
- Faust and Helena, cantata; poem by Eugène Adenis (1913)
- Five Melodies for voice and piano, after Maurice d'Assier poems (1914)
- Ave Verum Tota Pulchra Es, Motet for mixed choir, solo, organ and Strings (1920)
- Ce Monde de rosée, Fourteen Utas translated from Japanese (1925)
- Onchets, Five melodies on poems by René Chalupt (1929)
- Chansons de la ville et des champs, Six melodies in the popular style (1933)
- Four Songs by Clément Marot, melodies for soprano and piano (or orchestra) (1935)
- Pater Noster, for Mezzo (or Soprano) and organ (1937)
- Melody for voice and piano, after the poem "Un éventail, un sourire" by Pierre Bedat de Monlaur (1942)
- Salut solennel en sol, for choir, soli, organ and orchestra (1948)

=== Incidental music ===
- La femme à barde, Farce in Two Acts; Book by André de la Tourasse (1936)
- Automne, Incidental Music with choirs (1937)
- Œdipus-rex, Incidental Music with choirs (1939)
- Lucifer ou Le Mystère de Caïn, Mystere in One prologue and Three episodes; Book by René Dumesnil (1940)

=== Film and documentary music ===
- La Croisière jaune, Léon Poirier and André Sauvage documentary (1934)
- The Call of Silence, Léon Poirier film (1936)
- Sisters in Arms, Léon Poirier film (1937)
- Brazza ou l'épopée du Congo, Léon Poirier film (1940)
