= Kurt Wagenseil =

Kurt Wagenseil (26 April 1904 in Munich – 14 December 1988 in Tutzing) was a German translator, essayist and editor.

After attending high school, Wagenseil worked in an art gallery in Berlin. He frequently travelled to Paris and Berlin; this way, he became acquainted with several prominent writers, such as Henry Miller, who granted him the right to translate his work.

In 1935 Wagenseil was interned in Dachau concentration camp for bringing to Germany an antifascist book. Thanks to his friendship with British politician Harold Nicolson, he was released. After the end of World War II, Wagenseil lived in Tutzing near Starnberger See, where he worked for a publishing company.

He translated over 150 books into German, including the work of several important English-language writers: George Orwell's Nineteen Eighty-Four, Kurt Vonnegut's Slaughterhouse-Five, and many works by Henry Miller, William Somerset Maugham, Victoria Sackville-West and Virginia Woolf. He also translated from French the work of his friends Jean Cocteau, André Gide and André Maurois.
