= Paul Pierné =

French composer and organist

Paul Pierné (30 June 1874 – 24 March 1952) was a French composer and organist.

== Career ==
Born in Metz, he was a cousin of composer and organist Gabriel Pierné. His first musical lessons were from his father Charles, himself a former student of César Franck. Pierné later studied at the Conservatoire de Paris under Georges Caussade and Charles Lenepveu. He received a mention in the 1903 Prix de Rome, and took second place in the competition in 1904.

He served as organist at St-Paul-St-Louis Church in Paris, succeeding his father in the position in 1905 until his own death in Paris 1952.

His compositional output was wide-ranging, including two operas, several ballets, two symphonies, a number of orchestral tone poems, and chamber music, as well as large-form religious works, including two masses, an oratorio, and several smaller choral and organ works.
