= Georges Hugon =

French composer

Georges Hugon (23 July 1904 – 19 June 1980) was a French composer. He is the father of actress Sophie Daumier. His compositional output includes several chamber works, the ballet La Reine de Saba (1933, dedicated to Gustave Flaubert), two completed symphonies (1941 and 1949), and the unfinished symphony Prometheus.

Born in Paris, he studied with Georges Caussade, Paul Dukas, Jean Gallon, and Isidore Philipp at the Conservatoire de Paris. He won premier prix awards from the conservatoire in piano (1921), harmony (1921), and composition (1930). He was awarded a medal for composition by the Blumenthal Foundation in 1930. From 1934 to 1940 he served as director of the Conservatoire de Boulogne-sur-Mer. He was appointed professor of solfège at the Conservatoire de Paris in 1941, and in 1948 also began teaching courses in harmony. In 1967 the director of the conservatoire awarded him the Grand prix Musical for his distinguished teaching career. One of his notable pupils was Paul Kuentz.

He died in Blauvac.
