= Yves Baudrier =

French composer

- Born: Yves Marie Baudrier; 11 February 1906; Paris, France
- Died: 9 November 1988 (aged 82); Paris, France
- Occupation: Composer
- Years active: 1942–1974 (film & TV)

Yves Marie Baudrier (11 February 1906 – 9 November 1988) was a French composer. Along with André Jolivet, Olivier Messiaen and Jean-Yves Daniel-Lesur, he was a founder of the La jeune France group of composers.

He also competed in the mixed 6 metres at the 1936 Summer Olympics and in the music competition at the 1948 Summer Olympics.

== Selected filmography ==
- Dilemma of Two Angels (1948)
- The Man Who Returns from Afar (1950)
- The Glass Castle (1950)
- The Night Is My Kingdom (1951)
- The Seven Deadly Sins (1952)

== Bibliography ==
- Peter Bondanella: The Films of Roberto Rossellini (Cambridge: Cambridge University Press, 1993).
