= Marxist–Leninist views on Romanticism =

Starting from Karl Marx and Friedrich Engels, socialist writers have discussed Romanticism and its relationship to political economy and class struggle. Socialist and Marxist thinkers have generally viewed Romanticism as a contradictory intellectual and artistic movement, combining progressive cultural contributions with reactionary political tendencies rooted in opposition to capitalist modernity.

Marx and Engels categorized Romantic-aristocratic critiques of capitalism under feudal socialism, while later Marxist critics such as György Lukács, Franz Mehring, and Anatoly Lunacharsky offered more nuanced assessments. Views range from interpreting Romanticism as a fundamentally bourgeois movement in transition from feudal to capitalist society, to seeing it as a petty-bourgeois phenomenon marked by mysticism and an idealized retreat to the Middle Ages. Despite its perceived political limitations, many socialist writers acknowledged Romanticism's lasting contributions to literature, folklore, and the study of national and popular culture.

== Views of socialist writers on Romanticism ==
Karl Marx and Friedrich Engels considered the Romantic-aristocratic critiques of capitalism as belonging to the current which they called feudal socialism, characterizing it as simultaneously backward-looking and threatening, capable of sharp criticism of the bourgeoisie yet ultimately unable to grasp the direction of modern historical development.

Pyotr Semyonovich Kogan took a more positive view, arguing that the Romantics, through the force of their criticism, succeeded in identifying genuine errors of the Enlightenment, which in turn pushed progressive writers to work with greater care and avoid repeating those mistakes.

A. Vishnevsky (1941) characterized the Romantic movement as fundamentally opposed to the disharmony of the modern world and driven by a yearning for integral human development and harmonious social relations. However, he argued that this struggle against capitalist civilization took on a reactionary and utopian character, marked by illusory dreaminess and an inability to engage in sober, objective study of reality. He identified irrationalism and religious mysticism as essential elements of Romantic art, pointing to figures such as Novalis, Chateaubriand, and Coleridge as examples.

Vladimir Lenin argued that, unlike the Enlighteners who directed their hostility exclusively against the remnants of the past, the Romantic fell into a reactionary illusion by concluding from the contradictions of capitalism that capitalism did not represent a higher form of society.

Hungarian philosopher György Lukács, in contrast to most of his Marxist contemporaries, claimed that Romanticism is a bourgeois and not feudal intellectual current, a movement at the crossroads of the great historical transformation of feudal big property into capitalist property. Georgi Plekhanov viewed the Romantics as having begun as accusers of the bourgeoisie before ultimately becoming its apologists. Dimitris Glinos similarly held that Romanticism represented a compromise between the middle class intelligentsia and the feudal nobility, particularly in Germany amounting to the submission of the former to the latter.

According to Franz Mehring, the Romantics sought their national ideals in the Middle Ages, where the class domination of the Junkers and clergy was most intense. Since Medieval ideals could not be revived in their original form following the revolutionary upheavals that swept Europe, Romanticism in the economic, political, and religious field pursued a restoration of the Middle Ages that, after the historical collapse of those social formations, inevitably produced an idealized portrayal of feudal methods of exploitation.

Otto Grotewohl (1948) described Romanticism as a movement that looked to the dark mysticism of the Middle Ages for its models and held both democracy and revolution, as well as the emancipation of the people, in complete contempt. Heinrich Heine, himself a Romantic, argued in his 1833 work Die Romantische Schule that the poets of the Romantic school turned away from the present and attempted to restore the Middle Ages.

Anatoly Lunacharsky (1924) offered a more differentiated view of German Romanticism, arguing that while it was culturally reactionary due to its abandonment of revolutionary change and its strong tendencies toward mysticism, it was not politically reactionary. He noted that the German Romantics were always politically oriented toward progress, even if they lacked a clear sense of direction. A. S. Dmitriev summarized Lunacharsky's position as recognizing German Romanticism as a contradictory phenomenon in which, despite tendencies toward reaction, the progressive tendency ultimately prevailed.

Vishnevsky (1941) also argued that, as the first reaction against the establishment of capitalist reality, Romanticism contained a historically progressive content. It enriched European culture with an awareness, however vague, of the contradictions of the emerging capitalist epoch, and represented a significant step forward in the ideological and artistic development of humanity, playing a necessary role in the development of national self-awareness.

N. Berkovsky (1935) identified both progressive and reactionary dimensions within German Romanticism. On the progressive side, the German Romantics asserted the self-determination of the individual, proposed a reassessment of cultural values from a new bourgeois standpoint, advanced the principle of integral knowledge, and championed national identity as an expression of the awakening of popular forces. On the reactionary side, they retreated into extreme subjectivism, attempted to revive feudal authoritarianism against the encroaching world of capitalist competition, waged unconditional war on rationalism, which drove many of them toward mysticism, Catholicism, and the cult of estates, and proclaimed the complete separation of theory from practice, which they regarded with subjective-idealistic disdain as mere empiricism.

Aleksandr Borozdin described the contradictions of German Romanticism as stemming from the Romantics' tendency to study the Middle Ages not solely for historical reasons but for the practical purpose of revitalizing the rational atmosphere created by the Enlightenment and fostering national revival in Germany. While this tendentious engagement with the Middle Ages contained much that was false, it nonetheless stimulated the development of medieval historical scholarship and eventually helped that discipline move toward a more scientific approach. The Romantics' national tendencies were also legitimate given the conditions of oppression in Germany of the era and had their useful aspects; yet their fascination with antiquity led them to become increasingly detached from modern life, making them susceptible to serving reactionary ends.

D. S. Mirsky followed Lukács in rejecting the characterization of Romanticism as simply counter-revolutionary, emphasizing instead its contradictory nature across its various stages of development. He argued that the Romantic features of European literature were not inherently hostile to the general direction of the bourgeois revolution. The unprecedented attention given to inner emotional life reflected an important aspect of the cultural revolution accompanying the political one — namely, the emergence of an individual freed from feudal guild ties and religious authority. Yet in the course of the bourgeois revolution, this self-affirmation of the individual inevitably came into conflict with the real course of history.

Mirsky divided the course of Romanticism into three stages. In the first, Romanticism retained a politically radical and democratic character, though its revolutionary impulse was already purely abstract, recoiling from concrete revolutionary forms such as the Jacobin dictatorship and popular revolution. In Germany, this stage was philosophically expressed in Fichte's subjective idealism, understood as the philosophy of an ideal democratic revolution existing only in the mind of a bourgeois-democratic idealist; the parallel in England was the work of William Blake. In the second stage, having grown fully disillusioned with the real revolution, Romanticism sought to realize its ideals outside of politics through the free creative imagination. The concept of the artist as a spontaneous creator of new realities from fantasy arose at this stage, associated philosophically with Schelling in Germany and expressed in England, in a more unmediated form, in the verse of William Wordsworth and later Percy Bysshe Shelley. The third stage marked Romanticism's final transition to a reactionary position, as the Romantic sought support in supra-individual forces nationality and religion. Despite its reactionary aims at this stage, Mirsky acknowledged that Romanticism made lasting contributions to the revival and study of folklore, particularly folk songs, and did much to document the genuine life of the popular masses under feudalism and early capitalism.

== Romantic literature ==
The German Brockhaus Encyclopedia, in its 1940 Sprach-Brockhaus edition, defined "Romantic" in two senses: as a direction in spiritual life that emphasizes emotional experience over the intellectual, especially the German spiritual movement of the Napoleonic era, and as describing whatever is feeling-filled, wonderful, fairytale-like, wishful, or seemingly unreal.

Vissarion Belinsky, writing about Alexander Pushkin, defined the Romantic mood as the inner world of a person's soul and the innermost life of the heart, with its mysterious source lying in feeling and love, such that nearly every person is in some sense a Romantic. He held that the only exceptions were egoists incapable of loving anyone but themselves, or those whose capacity for sympathy and antipathy had been suppressed by moral underdevelopment or by the material hardships of a poor and difficult life; this, he said, was the most basic and natural conception of Romanticism.

For György Lukács, Romanticism was a contradictory movement that combined elements which revolutionized art and culture with others that impeded its progress. He argued that, despite its reactionary and decadent aspects, Romanticism reflected Germany's first popular movement since the Peasants' War, producing a strong return to popular life and folk art that intensified the revival of folk culture begun in the Herder period of the German Enlightenment. While much of this revival involved artistic affectation, it also opened the way to genuine folk poetry, as seen in collections such as Des Knaben Wunderhorn and the Grimm brothers' fairy tales. Beyond simply compiling existing folk material, Romanticism also produced, alongside its often highly artificial lyric poetry, a genuine folk-song-like continuation of the young Goethe's poetic style, as well as both refined literary fairy tales and an authentically folkish narrative art, tendencies Lukács considered most fully realized in the enduring work of Eichendorff.

D. S. Mirsky traced the origins of Romanticism to the naturalistic and emotion-based tendencies of European literature in the second half of the 18th century, linking the developing taste for the "romantic" to a growing cult of the natural over the artificial and of feeling over reason. He associated these tendencies with the pervasive subjectivism, or "sentimentalism," that dominated European literature in the decades preceding the French Revolution, alongside the growth of bourgeois-democratic aspirations associated with Rousseau and others.

A. Vishnevsky acknowledged the undeniable artistic charm of the best Romantic art, crediting the Romantics with achieving a deeper understanding of folk life and the hidden sources of fantasy and creativity. He argued that the period brought renewed attention to the historical greatness of peoples and to the myths, beliefs, legends, fairy tales, art, and poetry of the Middle Ages and the Renaissance after centuries of neglect, and credited the Romantics with restoring critical and popular attention to Shakespeare, Dante, Cervantes, Calderón, and Eastern poetry. In his view, this revived cultural wealth was absorbed into Romantic poetry and helped free art from the narrowness of 18th-century Classicism, with both scholarly and artistic understanding of peoples' historical pasts owing much to Romanticism, citing in particular the novels of Walter Scott, the work of French historians Guizot, Mignet, and Thierry, and the history of language and poetry produced by the brothers Grimm. He nonetheless considered Romantic historicism one-sided, largely limited to an interest in the Middle Ages.

Pyotr Semyonovich Kogan summarized the essence of Romanticism, and its eventual displacement by Realism amid 19th-century industrialization and urbanization, by observing that the Romantics rejected the age of statistics and political economy, seeking refuge from its prosaic demands in the mountains or in the vastness of the ocean. He noted, however, that even in the work of a poet such as Hugo, the noise of the street and the complaints of the hungry proletariat inevitably intruded, overtaking the evocations of medieval organs and the songs of Oriental odalisques.

Communist literary critic Franz Mehring credited Romanticism with rediscovering the treasures of medieval poetry, including not only courtly and knightly verse but also the Nibelungenlied, which he considered a German national epic comparable to Homer's. He emphasized that the Romantic school of poetry was especially significant for uncovering valuable folk poetry, citing the Brothers Grimm's fairy tales and Des Knaben Wunderhorn, a collection of old folk songs edited by Arnim and Brentano. Mehring further credited the Romantics with substantially broadening the poetic horizons of German culture: lacking firm ground of their own, they drew on the artistic traditions of many peoples and eras, producing notable achievements such as Schlegel's classic translation of Shakespeare.

A. S. Dmitriev concluded that the Romantic era represented the best decades of German literature, describing German Romanticism, in both its theory and its poetry and prose, as one of the most brilliant phenomena in world literature.
