= Daniel Lesur =

French organist and composer (1908–2002)

Daniel Jean-Yves Lesur (19 November 1908 – 2 July 2002) was a French organist and composer. He was the son of the composer Alice Lesur.

== Biography ==
Born in Paris, he entered the Conservatoire de Paris at age 11, studying solfège with Emile Schwartz, harmony with Jean Gallon, and composition with Georges Caussade. He also took private lessons in piano with Armand Ferté and composition with Charles Tournemire. From 1935 to 1964, he was professor of counterpoint at the Schola Cantorum under director Nestor Lejeune, becoming director himself in 1957.

In 1936, he co-founded the group La Jeune France along with composers Olivier Messiaen (with whom he would remain a lifelong friend), André Jolivet and Yves Baudrier, who were attempting to re-establish a more human and less abstract form of composition. La Jeune France developed from the avant-garde chamber music society La spirale, formed by Jolivet, Messiaen, and Daniel-Lesur the previous year.

That same year he, together with Jean Langlais and Jean-Jacques Grunenwald, gave the first performance of Olivier Messiaen's La Nativité du Seigneur.

Between 1927 and 1937 he seconded Tournemire at the organ of Ste. Clotilde, Paris, and was organist of the Benedictine Abbey of Paris, 1937–44. Daniel Lesur also served as director of the Opéra National de Paris from 1971 to 1973.

His opera Andrea del Sarto (1968) received the composition prize of the City of Paris in 1969. In 1973, he received the Prix Samuel Rousseau of the Académie des Beaux Arts. In 1982, he was elected member of the Institut de France.

He died in Paris.

== Selected compositions ==
Stage

- Andrea del Sarto (libretto after Alfred de Musset), opera in 2 acts (1949)
- Ondine (libretto after Jean Gireaudoux), opera in 3 acts (1981)
- La Reine morte (libretto after Henry de Montherland), not dated

Orchestral works

- Suite française (1935)
- Passacaille (1938) for piano and orchestra
- Pastorale (1938) for chamber orchestra
- Variations (1943) for piano and string orchestra
- Ouverture pour un festival (1951)
- Concerto da camera (1953) for piano and chamber orchestra
- Sérénade (1954) for string orchestra
- Intermezzo (1956; his contribution to Variations sur le nom de Marguerite Long)
- Symphonie de danses (1958)
- Symphonie 'd'ombre et de lumière (1974)
- Nocturne (1974) for oboe and string orchestra
- Fantaisie concertante (1992) for cello and orchestra

Chamber music

- Suite (1939) for oboe, clarinet, and bassoon
- Suite (1940) for string quartet
- Suite en trio (1943) for violin, viola, cello and piano
- Suite médiévale (1945) for flute, harp, violin, viola, cello
- Sextuor (1948) for flute, oboe, violin, viola, cello, harpsichord
- Élégie (1956) for two guitars
- Nocturne (1974) for oboe and piano
- Novelette (1977) for flute and piano
- Marine (1978) for harp
- Lamento (1983) for violin and piano
- Stèle à la mémoire d'un héros (1991) for flute and string quartet

Piano music

- Soirs (1929)
- Bagatelle (1934)
- Pavane (1938)
- Le Bouquet de Béatrice (1946) for piano 4-hands
- Pastorale varié (1947)
- Ballade (1948)
- Nocturne (1952)
- Le Bal (1954)
- 3 Études (1962)
- Fantaisie (1962) for 2 pianos
- L'Armoricaine (1964)
- Contre-fugue (1974) for 2 pianos
- Berceuse sur le nom de Schostakovitch (1975)
- Chanson à danser (1980)

Organ works

- Scène de la passion (1931)
- La Vie intérieure (1932)
- In paradisium (1933)
- Hymnes (1935)
- Quatre Hymnes (1939)

Choral works (with poets)

- Annonciation (Loÿs Masson), cantata for speaker, tenor, mixed chorus and chamber orchestra (1951)
- Le Cantique des cantiques (biblical) for 12 voices and chorus (1952)
- Cantique des colonnes (Paul Valéry) for female voices and orchestra (1957)
- Encore un instant de bonheur (Henry de Montherland)
- numerous folksong arrangements

Songs (for voice and piano)

- Les Harmonies intimes (Daniel-Lesur) (1931)
- La Mort des voiles (Paul Fort) (1931)
- La Mouette / Les Yeux fermés (Heinrich Heine) (1932)
- Quatre Lieder (Cécile Sauvage, Heine), several versions (1932–39)
- Trois Poèmes de Cécile Sauvage (1939)
- Deux Chansons de l'étoile de Seville (Claude Roy)
- L'Enfance de l'art (Claude Roy)
- Chansons cambodgiennes (traditional) (1946)
- Berceuses à tenir éveillé (René de Obaldia) (1947)
- Les Amants séparés (Claude Roy) (1950)
- Dialogues dans la nuit (Claude Roy) for mezzo-soprano, bass, and chamber orchestra (1987)
- À la lisière du temps / Le Voyage d'automne / Permis de séjour (Claude Roy) (1990)

== Le Cantique des cantiques ==
Daniel-Lesur's best-known composition is the a cappella choral work Le Cantique des cantiques, a setting for 12 voices of parts of the Song of Songs, interspersed with Latin verses and New Testament texts. The seventh and final movement, titled "Épithalame", utilizes "the combination of richly harmonised upper voices singing the famous words from Chapter 8 of the Song of Songs in French ("Pose-moi comme un sceau sur ton coeur, comme un sceau sur ton bras. Car l'amour est fort comme la mort') over an ostinato set to Latin words ("Veni sponsa Christi") [which] has very great cumulative power, reaching a mighty twelve-part climax where all the voices sing a succession of Alleluias which initially emerge from the complex texture in a repeated motif coloured by the Lydian mode – an idea which seems to suggest the joyous pealing of bells." (From his obituary; see external links.) The Cantique des cantiques has been recorded by Harry Christophers and The Sixteen, and is frequently performed internationally by such groups as Chanticleer and the Santa Fe Desert Chorale.
