= Louis Durey =

French composer (1888–1979)

Louis Edmond Durey (French: [dyʁɛ]; 27 May 1888 – 3 July 1979) was a French composer. He was among the Les Six group of composers.

== Biography ==
Durey was born into a bourgeois Parisian family, the son of a local businessman. It was not until he was nineteen years old that he chose to pursue a musical career after hearing a performance of music by Claude Debussy.

As a composer, he was primarily autodidact, in spite of a short educational period at the Schola Cantorum de Paris that was attended by his cousine Charlotte Durey, known as the composer Charlotte Sohy, as well. From the beginning, choral music was of great importance in Durey's productivity. His L'Offrande Lyrique (1914) has been called the first piece of French twelve-tone music. The first of his works to gain recognition in the music world was for a piano duet titled Carillons. At a 1918 concert, this work attracted the interest of Maurice Ravel, who recommended him to his publisher.

Communicating with his colleague, Darius Milhaud, he asked him to contribute a piano piece that would bring together the six composers who, in 1920 were dubbed Les Six, culminating in L'Album des Six. Despite their acclaim, Durey refused participation in the 1921 collaborative work Les mariés de la tour Eiffel, which gravely offended Jean Cocteau.

Following the Les Six period, Durey continued with his career. Never feeling the need to belong to the musical establishment, he voiced his growing left-wing ideals that put him in an artistic isolation that lasted for the rest of his life.

Following the break with Cocteau, Durey withdrew to his home in Saint-Tropez in the south of France. In addition to chamber music, at Saint-Tropez he wrote his only opera, L'Occasion. In 1929, he married Anne Grangeon and moved back to Paris the following year. In the mid-thirties he joined the Communist Party and became active in the newly formed Fédération Musicale Populaire. When Germany occupied France during World War II, he worked with the French Resistance as a prominent member of the Front National des Musiciens who worked to hide Jews and preserve French music under Nazi rule. He also wrote anti-fascist songs. As others, he stopped composing under Nazi rule and instead arranged and collected older French music and folk songs.

After the war, he embraced hard-line communism and his uncompromising political attitudes hindered his career. Needing to earn a living, in 1950 he accepted the post of music critic for a communist newspaper in Paris.

In the late 1950s and early 1960s, he continued to compose but these works did not reach widespread popularity. His work on Vietnamese themes in the 1960s, based on his disgust with the turmoil France had left in Vietnam (formerly French Indochina) and the ensuing Vietnam War, were atypical in Paris of the time. He set poems by Ho Chi Minh and Mao Zedong. Other works include a string quartet, a flute sonatina, and Images à Crusoe.

He died in Saint-Tropez in 1979.

== Piano works ==
| Year | Opus | Work |
|---|---|---|
| 1916-8 | Op.7 | Deux Pièces pour piano a quatre mains, "Carillons" (1916) and "Neige" (1918) |
| 1917 | Op.9 | Scènes de Cirque |
| 1919 | Op.21 | Romance sans paroles (for L'Album des Six) |
| 1920 | Op.26 | Trois Préludes |
| 1920 | Op.28 | Prélude et Élégie |
| 1921 | Op.29 | Deux Études |
| 1921(?) | Op.30 | Le Blé en herbe |
| 1926 | Op.36 | Trois Sonatines |
| 1928 | Op.40 | Nocturne en re bémol |
| 1924-8 | Op.41 | Dix Inventions |
| 1951 | Op.68 | Dix Basquaises |
| 1953 | Op.75 | Six Pièces: "L'Automne 53" |
| 1956-7 | Op.83 | Concertino pour piano, seize instruments à vent, contrebasse et timbales |
