= Roger Désormière =

French conductor (1898–1963)

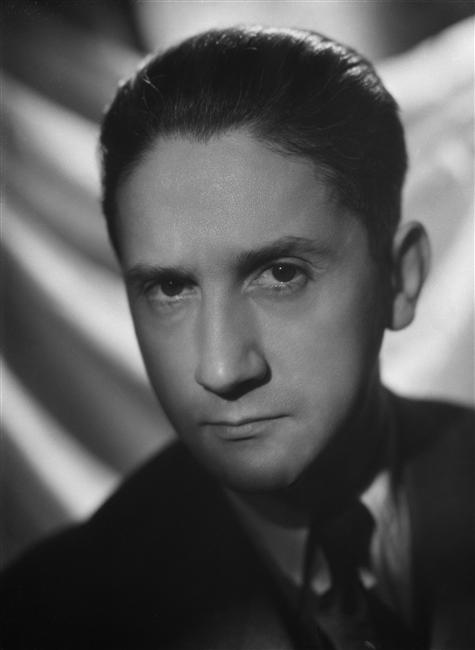
Roger Désormière

Roger Désormière (French pronunciation: [ʁɔʒe dezɔʁmjɛːʁ]) (13 September 1898 – 25 October 1963) was a French conductor. He was an enthusiastic champion of contemporary composers, but also conducted performances of early eighteenth century French music.

== Life and career ==
Désormière was born in Vichy in 1898. He studied at the Paris Conservatoire, where his professors included Philippe Gaubert (flute), Xavier Leroux and Charles Koechlin (composition), and Vincent d'Indy (conducting). In 1922 he won the Prix Blumenthal and in 1923 became part of the Ecole d’Arcueil.

Désormière's early conducting experience was largely with the Ballets suédois and Sergei Diaghilev's Ballets Russes. He was conductor of the Ballets suédois's premiere of Relâche (1924), a film and music presentation by Francis Picabia and Erik Satie, with the film segment, Entr'acte, directed by René Clair. He then worked for the Diaghilev company from 1925 until the impresario's death, conducting the premieres of Barabau by Vittorio Rieti, The Prodigal Son and Le pas d'acier by Sergei Prokofiev, and La Chatte by Henri Sauguet.

From 1932 he became involved in music for films with Pathé-Nathan, composing music for La Règle du jeu, Le Mariage de Chiffon, and Le Voyageur de la Toussaint. He also conducted the orchestra in over 20 other films, such as Partie de campagne, Remorques, La Belle et la bête, and La Beauté du diable.

He conducted the first complete recording of Claude Debussy's opera Pelléas et Mélisande, the sessions taking place in the Salle de l'Ancien Conservatoire, Paris, from 24 April to 26 May 1941, during the Nazi occupation, with the 20-record set being issued in January 1942. He also recorded excerpts from Chabrier's L'étoile with Opéra-Comique forces during the war.

Désormière was a member of the French Communist Party and personally a friend of Maurice Thorez. During the occupation of Paris he was a member of the Front National des Musiciens. Following the fall of France the composer Darius Milhaud was obliged to leave France. Désormière saved his paintings and personal possessions as well as paying the apartment rent during the Occupation.

He also won considerable fame as an enthusiastic champion of 20th-century repertoire: Satie, Olivier Messiaen, Pierre Boulez, Henri Dutilleux, and Maurice Duruflé all benefited from his advocacy of their pieces. At the other chronological extreme, Désormière edited and performed early music, reviving mostly forgotten compositions by the likes of François Couperin, Jean-Philippe Rameau, and Michel Richard Delalande. From 1937 he was a leading conductor for the Paris Opéra-Comique, conducting, in addition to the creations below and recordings above, Une éducation manquée, L'heure espagnole, Le médecin malgré lui, Don Quichotte and L'Enlèvement au Sérail. He became an associate director of the Paris Opéra from 1945 to 1946.

While driving in Rome during 1952, he suffered a massive paralytic stroke that ended all his musical activities. Aphasic for the rest of his life, he remained a recluse. He died in Paris in 1963.

== Premieres ==
Works whose premieres were conducted by Désormière include:

- Prokofiev – Le pas d'acier (1926)
- Prokofiev - The Prodigal Son (1928)
- Igor Markevitch – Cantata and Concerto Grosso (1930) and L'Envol d'Icare (1933)
- Albert Roussel – Le Testament de Tante Caroline (Opéra-Comique, 11 March 1937)
- Darius Milhaud – Esther de Carpentras (Opéra-Comique, 3 February 1938)
- Francis Poulenc – Concerto for Organ, Strings and Timpani (1939)
- Poulenc – Les animaux modèles (1942)
- Alexandre Tansman – Sixth Symphony 'In memoriam' (French Radio Choir and Orchestra, 1944)
- Messiaen – Trois petites liturgies de la présence divine (1945)
- Poulenc – Sinfonietta (1948)
- Dutilleux – Symphony No. 1 (1951)

== Discography ==
His discography includes:

- Bartók – Divertimento for String Orchestra
- Boulez – Le Soleil des eaux
- Chabrier – L'étoile (excerpts)
- Dallapiccola – Six chants d'Alcée
- Debussy – Pelléas et Mélisande (complete)
- Debussy – La mer
- Delibes – suites to Coppélia and Sylvia
- Ibert – Divertissement
- Ippolitov-Ivanov – Esquisses Caucasiennes, Suite No. 1, Op. 10
- Koechlin – Le Buisson ardent, Les Eaux vives.
- Poulenc – Les biches ballet suite
- Satie – Trois morceaux en forme de poire
- Scarlatti arr. Tommasini – Les femmes de bonne humeur (ballet)
- Stravinsky – Concerto in D for strings
- Tchaikovsky – The Sleeping Beauty suite
