= List of compositions by Božidar Kantušer =

List by instrumentation (and chronologically within the sections), based on a facsimile copy of Božidar Kantušer's manuscripts that are kept at the Library of Congress, and on the composer's catalogs. Vocal music is distributed in the list.

Model:
Title (date of composition)
Instrumentation
Duration
Publisher and year of publication
Date, venue and performers of the world premiere and of the first recording.

== Orchestral music ==
=== Symphonies ===
Chamber Symphony (1954)
TMP,CEL/string quartet/STR
21'
EDSS (Edicije Društva slovenskih skladateljev – Publications of the Society of Slovene Composers)

Te Deum (1956)
S, A, T, B (SATB)/2222/3220/ STR
20'
Dedicated to the artist Emil Wachter.

Sire Halewyn, symphonic drama in 14 pictures (1960)
3333/4331/TMP,PR,CEL,H/ STR
50'
EDSS
After the theater piece Sire Halewyn by Michel de Ghelderode. Premiere in Metz in 1968 by the Metz symphony orchestra under the direction of Jean-Jacques Werner. Recorded in 1983 by the RTV Slovenia Symphony Orchestra under the direction of Anton Nanut. See also Flemish Legend in the Ballets section.

Symphony No. 2, for Strings (1965)
24'
EMT (Éditions Musicales Transatlantiques, Paris), 1966
Premiere in 1966 in Strasbourg by the Orchestre philharmonique de Strasbourg conducted by Jean-Jacques Werner. Recorded in 1991 by the RTV Slovenia Symphony Orchestra conducted by Anton Nanut.

Symphony No. 2 - 1st mvt (digital playback)

Symphony No. 2 - 2nd mvt (digital playback)

Symphony No. 2 - 3rd mvt (digital playback)

Concert Overture (1967 – revision 1992)
2222/3220/TMP,H/STR
9'
EMT
Premiere in Nice in 1970 by the Nice-Côte d'Azur Orchestra under the direction of Jean-Jacques Werner. Recorded in 1977 for RTV Slovenija by the Orchestra of the European union of music schools (EMU) under the direction of Jean-Jacques Werner.

Symphony No. 3 (1973 – revision 1976)
2223/4331/TMP,PR,CEL,H/STR
24'
EDSS
First performance in 1980 by the RTV Slovenia Symphony Orchestra conducted by Anton Nanut (recording).

Symphony No. 3 : 3rd mvt - Presto (digital rendering)

Coexistence No. 1, for chamber orchestra (1977)
FL,TRB,PR/STR
12'
Commissioned by RTV Slovenija. Premiere in Opatija at the 1977 Annual composer's festival, under the direction of Uroš Lajovic. Recorded for RTV Slovenija.

Symphony No. 4 (1981)
3333/4431/TMP,5 PR/STR
20'
EDSS
First performance in 1984 by the RTV Slovenia Symphony Orchestra conducted by Anton Nanut (recording). Concert premiere in 2005 on the occasion of the twentieth anniversary of the Slovenian Music Days (Ljubljana Festival) by the same orchestra, conducted by En Shao.

"Eppur si muove" (1985)
Strings
14'
Published by Marc Lombard
Commissioned by RTV Slovenija. Premiere in 1986 at the Cankar Hall in Ljubljana by the RTV Slovenia Symphony Orchestra under the direction of Volker Rohde (live recording). Recorded in 1987 by the same orchestra, under the direction of Anton Nanut.

Épaves II (1992)
RE/A/FL,CB,PR/2222/4230/TMP,PR,H,/STR
21'
EDSS
Poems by Daniel des Brosses. Recorded in 1993 by Jurij Souček RE, Sabira Hajdarović MS, and the RTV Slovenia Symphony Orchestra conducted by Nikolaj Žličar. See Épaves (1987) in the Ensembles section.

=== Concerti ===
Music for Cello and Orchestra (1962)
VC/2221/2110/TMP,PR/STR
16'
Éditions Françaises de Musique (EFM), at Gérard Billaudot Éditeur
Commissioned by the ORTF. Premiere in 1973 by Germaine Teuillères and the Nice-Côte d'Azur Orchestra under the direction of Pol Mule.

Concerto for Flute, String Orchestra and Percussion (1962 – revision 1966)
20'
EDSS
Television premiere (ORTF) in 1965 by Roger Bourdin and the orchestra of the Collegium Musicum of Strasbourg conducted by Roger Delage (the INA recording is preceded by an interview of the compositeur by Lucienne Bernadac). Audio recording in 1968 by Fedja Rupel and the RTV Slovenia Symphony Orchestra conducted by Samo Hubad.

Concerto for Cello and Orchestra (1966)
VC/2222/4220/TMP,PR/STR
22'
EFM – Billaudot
Premiere in 1977 par Miloš Mlejnik and the RTV Slovenia Symphony Orchestra under the direction of Samo Hubad. The recording appears on a LP record and received the annual prize for the best recording in Yugoslavia (String Quartet N° 4 is on the other side of the record).

Concerto for Double Bass and Viola and Orchestra (1994)
VLA,CB/2222/4220/TMP,PR,H/STR
22'
Premiere in 1996 by Franc Avsenek VLA, Budislav Vidrih CB, and the RTV Slovenia Symphony Orchestra conducted by Anton Nanut.

== Ballets and opera ==
=== Ballets ===
The Vaccarès Beast (1962)
FL/PR/STR
20'
Scenario after the novel by Joseph d'Arbaud. See Concerto for Flute.

Two choreographic Images (1963)
FL,CL,VC,P,2 PR
9'
EDSS 1977
Premiere in 1963 at the American Center in Paris by Laura Sheleen – danse and choreography, Alain Marion FL, Cl. Rosseeuw CL, Alain Menier VC, Bill Moraldo P, Willy Coquillat and Gaston Sylvestre PRC, under the direction of Keith Humble. Recording: see Two Images in the Ensembles section.

Midsummer Night (Kresna noč) (1964)
6 PR
20'
Premiere for Slovenian television (RTV Slovenija) by Majna Sevnik in 1979. See Suite in Four Movements for Percussions in the Ensembles section.

Flemish Legend (Flamska Legenda), in two acts. (1983)
3333/4331/TMP,PR,CEL,H/STR
90'
EDSS
After the theater piece Sire Halewyn by Michel de Ghelderode. Premiere in 1985 in Maribor on the occasion of the 65th anniversary of Slovenian Opera in Maribor. Performances until 1986. Choreography by Vlasto Dedović. Vojko Vidmar was the principal dancer (Halewyn) and the orchestra was conducted by Boris Švara. See also Sire Halewyn, symphonic drama (1960) in the Symphonies section.

=== Opera ===
On Christmas Eve, in one act (unfinished).
A,T,Bar,B,(SATB)/Actress,RE/2222/4230/TMP,PR,H,CMB,P,Synt/STR
After the 1883 short story by Anton Chekhov.

== Chamber music ==
=== String quartets ===
String Quartet No. 1 (1953 – revision 1983)

- 16'

I. II.

- Premiere in 1955 in Paris at the Institut d'Art, by Zaven Melikian, Jean Verdier, Pierre Lefebvre, Viktor Jakovčić.

String Quartet No. 2 (1959)

- 17'

I. II. III.

- Premiere and recording in 1982 in Ljubljana by the RTV Slovenija String Quartet (Božo Mihelčič, Karel Žužek, Franc Avsenek, Stanislav Demšar).

String Quartet No. 3 (1961)

- 16'

I. II. III.

- Premiere in 1965 for France Culture by the ORTF String Quartet (Jean Dumont, Jacques Dejean, Marc Carles, Robert Salles). Recording in 1975 by the RTV Slovenija String Quartet (Slavko Zimšek, Karel Žužek, Franc Avsenek, Stanislav Demšar).

String Quartet No. 4 (1980)

- 20'

I. & II. III. IV.

- Premiere in 1980 for RTV Slovenija by the Zagreb Quartet (Đorđe Trkulja, Marija Cobenzl, Ante Živković, Josip Stojanović). The recording appears on a LP record (the Concerto for Cello is on the other side of the record).

String Quartet No. 5 (1983)

- 18'

I. II. III. IV. V.

- Commissioned by the RTV Slovenija String Quartet. Premiere and recording in 1984 by the RTV Slovenija String Quartet (Božo Mihelčič, Karel Žužek, Franc Avsenek, Stanislav Demšar).

String Quartet No. 6 (1984)

- 20'30

I. II. III. IV.

- Commissioned by the Zagreb Quartet. Premiere and recording in 1984 in Ljubljana by the RTV Slovenija String Quartet (Božo Mihelčič, Karel Žužek, Franc Avsenek, Stanislav Demšar).

String Quartet No. 7 (1987–88)

- 20'

I. II. III. IV.

- Dedicated to Leon Engelman. Premiere in 1989 by the RTV Slovenija String Quartet (Monika Skalar, Karel Žužek, Franc Avsenek, Stanislav Demšar) for the Slovenian Music Days (Ljubljana Festival).

All seven quartets were published by Marc Lombard.

=== Ensembles ===
Two Images (1963)
FL,CL,VC,P,2 PR
9'
EDSS 1977
Premiere in 1963 at the American Center in Paris by Laura Sheleen – danse and choreography, Alain Marion FL, Cl. Rosseeuw CL, Alain Menier VC, Bill Moraldo P, Willy Coquillat and Gaston Sylvestre PRC, under the direction of Keith Humble. Recording in 1979 for RTV Slovenija by the Ensemble Slavko Osterc under the direction of Ivo Petrić.

Sonata da Camera (1963)

Sonata da Camera (digital playback)

FL, VL, VC et P
10'
Commissioned by the Quatuor Instrumental de Paris. Premiere in 1964 at the Gaveau Hall in Paris by the Quatuor Instrumental de Paris: Janine Volant-Panel VL, Maryse Gauci FL, Mireille Reculard VC, Elsa Menat P.

Suite in Four Movements for Percussions (1964 – revision 1979)
6 PR
20'
Commissioned by the Groupe instrumental à percussion de Strasbourg. Premiere in 1978 at the Festival of 20th Century chamber music in Radenci (Slovenia), by the Ljubljana Percussion ensemble (Boris Šurbek, Jože Mihelčič, Anton Gradišek, Darko Gorenc, Franc Krušič, Miha Juvan). 1979 revision: Four Mouvements for Percussions, for 4 PR (18'). See also Midsummer Night in the Ballets section.

Tribute to Igor Stravinsky, prelude for 7 instruments (1982)
CL,FG/TR,TRB/PR/VL,CB,
7'
Premiere in 1982 in Paris by the Tübingen Camerata conducted by Alexander Šumski. Recording in 1986 for RTV Slovenija – ensemble conducted by Kristijan Ukmar.

Épaves (Wrecks) (1987)
RE,A(MS)/FL,CB,PR,recorded tape
21'
Poems by Daniel des Brosses, translation Oblak/Pevel. Premiere in 1987 at the Slovenian Philharmonic Hall for the Slovenian Music Days (Ljubljana Festival) by I. Zavrh RE, Sabira Hajdarović MS, Janez Petelin FL, Borut Kantušer CB, Boris Šurbek PR, Bor Turel tape recorder, under the direction of Kristijan Ukmar. Recording in 1987 for RTV Slovenija by Milan Marinič RE, Sabira Hajdarović MS, Janez Petrač FL, Borut Kantušer CB, Boris Šurbek PR, Bor Turel tape recorder, under the direction of Kristijan Ukmar. See also Épaves II (1992) in the Symphonies section.

Consolamentum (1988)
MS/CL,PR,P,CB
17'
Poetry by Claude Boutet.

Coexistence No. 2 (1989)
MS/CL,PR,P,CB
18'
Premiere in 1990 at the Slovenian Philharmonic Hall by Sabira Hajdarović MS, A. Zupan CL, Boris Šurbek PR, Aci Bertoncelj P, Budislav Vidrih CB. See Consolamentum (1988).

Quintetto d'Archi (1989)
2VL,VLA,VC,CB
7'
Premiere in 1996 in Fresnes by members of the Léon Barzin Orchestra, on the occasion of a concert in honor of the composer's 75th birthday.

Incantation (1992)
OB,CL,VL,VLA,CB
10'
Premiere in 1994 at the Slovenian Philharmonic Hall by the Prokofiev Quintet (Matej Šarc OB, Jurij Jenko CL, Tomaž Lorenz VL, Svava Bernharðsdóttir VLA, Zoran Marković CB). Recording in 1995 for the Quintet's CD-ROM.

Sarajevo, Grabdenkmal Europas (1993)
Instrumental ensemble and CB solo
7'
Premiere in 1995 in Vienna by the Jean-Louis Petit Orchestra.

=== Trios ===
Trio for Flute, Viola and Piano (1961)
13'
Premiere in 1962 at the Cortot Hall by Maxence Larrieu, Anne Queille VLA, and Françoise Bonnet P.

Largo for Clarinet, Bassoon and Piano (1969)
4'30
Commissioned by the Trio Pro Musica Rara. Premiere in 1970 in Trieste (Circolo della Cultura et delle Arti) by the Trio Pro Musica Rara (Franc Tržan CL, Srečko Korošak FG, Leon Engelman P).

Trio for Violin, Cello and Piano (1976, revision 1983)
13'30
Published by Marc Lombard
Commissioned by the Trio Lorenz. Recording for RTV Slovenija in 1977 by the Trio Lorenz (Tomaž, Matija and Primož Lorenz). Premiere in 1983 at the Festival of 20th Century chamber music in Radenci (Slovenia) by the Trio Lorenz (live recording).

Music for Clarinet, Cello and Piano (1977)
10'
Commissioned by the Trio Pro Musica Rara. Premiere in 1978 by the Trio Pro Musica Rara (Franc Tržan CL, Edvard Adamič VC, Leon Engelman P) at the Cité internationale des arts in Paris. Recording for RTV Slovenija in 1981 by the Trio Pro Musica Rara.

Approaches, for Clarinet, Viola and Piano (1979)
10'
Premiere in 1985 in Nantes (Il Convito Musicale di Roma) by Lee Yih-Nigh CL, Pierre-Henri Xuereb VLA, and Lucia Morabito P.

4 Sketches, for Flute, Viola and Piano (1982)
13'
Published by Marc Lombard
Premiere in 1982 in Kamnik by Maja Robinšak FL, Franc Avsenek VLA and Leon Engelman P. Recording in 1982 for RTV Slovenija, by the same musicians.

Approaches II, for Clarinet, Double Bass and Piano (1987)
11'
Premiere in 1989 at Križanke (Knight's Hall), by Jurij Jenko CL, Borut Kantušer CB, and Bojan Gorišek P. Recording in 1989 for RTV Slovenija, by the same musicians.

Interlude for Violin, Harp and Cello ad lib (1988)
4'

Trio for Violin, Piano and Double Bass (1989)
13'30
Premiere in 1997 at the Cité internationale des arts, Paris, by Vera Belič VL, Borut Kantušer CB, and Bojana Karuza P. Recording in 1997 for RTV Slovenija, by the same musicians.

Woodwind Trio (1993)
Flute, Clarinet, Bassoon
10'
Premiere in 1994 in Paris (Musicora salon) by the Trio Slowind (Aleš Kacjan FL, Jurij Jenko CL, Zoran Mitev FG). Recording in 1994 for the Trio's CD-ROM.

=== Duets ===
Trenutek (1951)
Voice and Piano
Dedicated to Veno Pilon. The poem Trenutek (The Instant) is by Josip Murn.

Three Melodies for Baritone and Piano (1959)
10'
Poems by Maurice Carême. Premiere in 1962 by Louis-Jacques Rondeleux and Odette Pigault for Radio France (program presented by Jane Bathori). Recording in 1989 for RTV Slovenija by Samo Vremšak and Leon Engelman.

Evocations for Horn in F and Piano (1963)
9'
EMT 1971
Premiere in 1966 for RTV Slovenija by Jože Falout and Aci Bertoncelj.

Song (1964 – revision 1991)
Voice and Piano
3'30
Poem by Charles d'Orléans. Premiere in 1996 and recording appearing on a CD-ROM by Juan Vasle BAR and Leon Engelman P (translation Jože Stabej).

C'est grand peine... (1966)
Voice and Piano
4'
Poem by Blosseville.

Monologue for two (1980)
Violon and Piano
12'
EDSS 1990
Premiere in 1982 by Rodrigue Milosi VL and Georges Delvallée piano, at the Cité internationale des arts, Paris.

Encounters for Double Bass and Celtic Harp (1980–81)
8'
Premiere in 1981 at the Semaine Musicale de Fresnes (Fresnes Music Week) by Borut Kantušer CB and Denise Mégevand H.

Duet for Bassoon and Piano (1984)
6'
Premiere (recording) in 1984 for RTV Slovenija, by Jože Banič FG and Leon Engelman P.

Sospevi (1984)
Flute and Viola
10'
Premiere (recording) in 1986 for RTV Slovenija, by Maja Robinšak FL et Franc Avsenek VLA.

Dialogue for Violin and Organ (1984)
12'30
Premiere in 1989 by Annie Jodry VL and Georges Delvallée P at Saint-Séverin. Also see Monologue for two (1980).

5 Chants for Flute and Cello (1984)
11'

Sonata for Violin and Double Bass (1987)
10'
Premiere in 1996 in Ljubljana at the Slovenian Philharmonic Hall by Vera Belič VL and Borut Kantušer CB. Recording in 1997 for RTV Slovenija by the same musicians.

Echoes of silence (1988)
Clarinet and Percussions
16'
Premiere in 1989 in Ljubljana by Jurij Jenko CL and Boris Šurbek PR.

Interlude for Violin and Harp (and Cello -ad lib) (1988)
4'

Encounter No. 3 (1989)
Double Bass and Piano
10'
Premiere at Križanke in Ljubljana in 1989 by Borut Kantušer CB and Bojan Gorišek P. Recording for RTV Slovenija in 1989 by the same musicians.

Three Moods (1990)
Double Bass and Piano
15'
Dedicated to Gerd Reinke. Premiere in 1992 at the Cité internationale des arts, Paris by Borut Kantušer CB and Françoise Pujol P. Personal recording (Marc Lombard) in 1997, by Borut Kantušer CB and Bojana Karuza P.

East Side Dream No. 2 (1994)
Violon and Piano
4'
See East side dream, for P.

Improvisando No. 2 (1995)
Flute in G and Piano
10'

Improvisando No. 1 (1996)
Flute and Piano
10'

In parenthesis (1996)
Flute in G and Piano
1'15

Particles (1997)
Double Bass and Piano
10'
Premiere in 1998 at the Cité internationale des arts, Paris by Borut Kantušer CB and Bojana Karuza P.

=== Solos ===
==== Piano ====
Prelude and Fugue (1946)

- 7'
- Fugue
- Premiere in 1953 by Luc Ferrari at the Maison des Lettres (Sorbonne, Paris).

Three Pieces (1952)
7'
Premiere in 1952 by Bep Geuer at the Akademia Raymond Duncan in Paris.

Three Bagatelles (1953 – revision 1956)
5'30
Premiere in 1954 by Luc Ferrari at the Maison des Lettres (Sorbonne, Paris). Recording for RTV Slovenija in 1980 by Leon Engelman.

Letters to my wife (1976)
12'
Premiere in 1979 in Richmond by Voya Toncitch who records the piece for Radio France, also in 1979. Recording in 1980 by Leon Engelman for RTV Slovenija, for a radio program devoted to the composer.

Once upon a time... (1983)
1'30
Gérard Billaudot Éditeur (Panorama Piano – Volume 1)

Tribute to Hugo Wolf (1989 – revision 1995)
8'

East Side Dream (1994)
6'
Premiere in 1997 in Paris by Bojana Karuza, at the Cité Internationale des Arts. Personal recording (Marc Lombard) in 1997 by Bojana Karuza.

==== Organ ====
Prelude and Fugue (1968)
7'
EMT 1972
Dedicated to Georges Delvallée who premieres it in 1973 at the Festival d'été de Sceaux (Sceaux summer festival). The work appears on a LP record of contemporary organ music (Sonotec) recorded by Georges Delvallée. See also Prelude and Fugue for Piano (1946).

How Long... meditation on Psalm 13 (1974)
17'
EDSS 1984
Dedicated to Georges Delvallée. Premiere in 1982 in Lille by Georges Delvallée, at the Festival du printemps de musique d'orgue (Spring festival of organ music).

Toccata (1983)
4'30
Premiere upon recording in 2015 by Georges Delvallée.

Sketch (1984)
11'
Premiere in 1983 in Venice at the Sant'Agnese church, by Georges Delvallée.

Five Preludes (1989)
17'
Dedicated to Emil Wachter. Premiere in 1988 in Ettlingen at the Saint-Martin church, by Georges Delvallée.

The complete opus for organ was recorded by Georges Delvallée and is the subject of a CD.

==== Other ====
For Double Bass alone (1980–81)
12'
EDSS 1988
Premiere in 1982 at the Cité internationale des Arts by Borut Kantušer who records the piece for RTV Slovenija in 1982.

Tale for Violin (1981)
6'
Commissioned by Tomaž Lorenz. Premiere in 1981 by Tomaž Lorenz at the Society of composers Concert Atelier in Ljubljana.

Traces for Celtic Harp (1982)
9'
Premiere (recording) in 1982 for Radio France by Denise Mégevand.
