= Božidar Kantušer =

Classical composer (1921–1999)

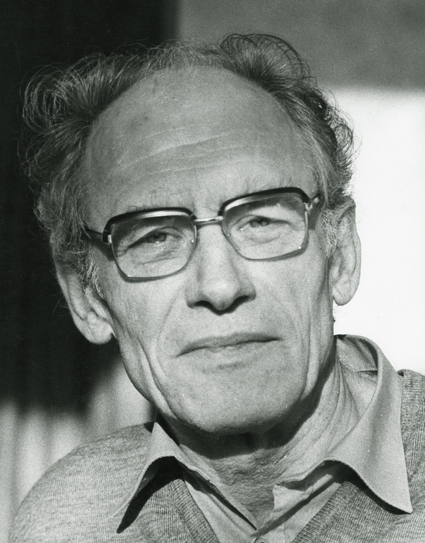
- Born: December 5, 1921; Pavlovski Vrh, Kingdom of Serbs, Croats and Slovenes
- Died: May 9, 1999 (aged 77); Paris, France
- Works: List of compositions
- Spouse: Grace Renzi

Božidar Kantušer (Bozidar Kantuser) (December 5, 1921, Pavlovski Vrh, Slovenia – May 9, 1999, Paris) was a Slovene composer of classical music. He was a Slovenian citizen and an American citizen.

Kantušer is the author of symphonic music, ballets, chamber music and solo pieces. He lived in France from 1950. He was married to the American painter Grace Renzi. From 1968, Kantušer was the director of the International Library of Contemporary Music (B.I.M.C.). He is buried in Paris, at the Père Lachaise Cemetery.

== Life ==
Božidar Kantušer was born on a farm in Pavlovski Vrh, in the countryside of northeastern Slovenia. He was the first of the five children of Blaž Kantušer and his wife Katarina, born Hočevar. His father, from a family of farmers near Celje, and his mother, from a family of blacksmiths from Kamnik, were both employed in Ljutomer after World War I and lived in Pavlovski Vrh, close to Ljutomer, from 1919 to 1929. The rural environment, the cultural heritage and the nature of his native Prlekija, where he lived for the first seven years, left a lasting impression on the composer. The dances of masks of pagan origin (Kurenti) and the bonfire wheels of fire (Kresi) that he witnessed at the time opened for him the universe of fiction, a subject to which Kantušer dedicated several works, such the ballet Midsummer Night, which also uses another childhood memory, namely work rhythms specific to particular farming tasks.

Kantušer attended first grade (1928–29) in Ljutomer, after which the family moved to Celje, his father's birthplace, and where he endorsed a cadastral employment. Moreover, a beekeeper, his father also encouraged the musical education of all his children, so that from 1932 to 1940 Kantušer attended the Celje Music School (Glasbena Matica Celje) where he learned to play the violin (and viola) with Ivan Karlo Sancin. Sancin also shared his knowledge of violin making and thanks to him, the composer's younger brother Joža later became a violin maker. Kantušer's affinity for the strings thus developed from his experience with the Celje orchestra, and the practice of chamber music. It was during adolescence that the desire to express himself formed, which grew into the need to study composition. In the second half of the 1930s, he attended Celje High School and took also part in the laic Scout movement. The Kantušer children often spent the summer months at the foot of the Alps, in Kamnik, the birthplace of the composer's mother.

In 1941, Kantušer had to flee from the Nazis. In order to finish high school, he left his family in Celje and headed for Ljubljana. There he also met the professor of composition Srečko Koporc who started teaching him. Being an agitator, Kantušer was arrested by the fascists in 1942 and deported to concentration camps for Slavs, in Italy. Upon his return from internment in 1943, he nearly succumbed to paratyphoid but met Koporc again in Ljubljana. In 1944, Kantušer joined the resistance. After the end of World War II, he settled again in Ljubljana so as to continue his composition studies with Koporc. He signed his first work in 1946, a fugue with two subjects, adding a prelude in 1948. The Prelude and Fugue for piano is the only work of this period that Kantušer retained in his catalog (two orchestral scores remain unfindable). In 1947, he received a visa for to study in Prague but stayed in Ljubljana and completed his studies in 1948 with Koporc. From 1945 to 1950 he lived a student life. He was notably befriended with the artist Karel Zelenko, with whom he shared different lodgings, but also lived in Koporc's apartment. In 1950, he left for Paris, with a visa.

In the early 1950s, he lived in Montparnasse, various small jobs following one another. He mingled with the artistic milieu and notably made friends with the painters Pranas Gailius, Raphael Kherumian, Veno Pilon and Emil Wachter. In 1952 and 1953 Kantušer attended the classes by Olivier Messiaen as well as those by Tony Aubin and by Jean Rivier, at the Conservatoire de Paris. He also attended the lectures on esthetics by Étienne Souriau at the Sorbonne and took part in the Darmstädter Ferienkurse. In 1953, together with Luc Ferrari, Pierre Migaux and Yves Ramette he founded Group 84. In the same year, he signed his first string quartet and met the American artist Grace Renzi who became his wife. The couple moved to the République quarter. In 1954, Kantušer signed his first symphony, the Chamber Symphony. In 1955, a son was born, Borut, and in the same year String Quartet № 1 was premiered. As he was unable to renew his Yugoslav passport, Kantušer received the emigrant status. In 1957, the family moved to Bordeaux where Grace Renzi endorsed employment as a teacher in the U.S. Army schools, and next moved to Fontainebleau in 1959, the year Kantušer signed his second string quartet.

In Fontainebleau, living near the forest (Villa Bois Couvert), Kantušer reconnected with nature, going for long walks. During the Fontainebleau years, the composer produced many symphonic works: the symphonic drama Sire Halewyn (1960), the Symphony № 2 (1965), a Concert Overture, the Cello Concerto and the Flute Concerto. In 1965, Roger Bourdin premiered the Flute Concerto, which was broadcast on television (ORTF) in a program dedicated to the composer. The ballet Two Images was premiered at the American Center in Paris. In the second half of the 60s, he became friends with the conductor Jean-Jacques Werner, the organist Georges Devallée and Marc Lombard, and also had professional relationships with them during his entire career. String Quartet № 3 was premiered, as well as Symphony № 2 and the symphonic drama Sire Halewyn. Three Melodies for Baritone and Piano is recorded for the ORTF. During holidays, the family regularly took to the road, visiting various European countries. In summer 1966, they made a long bus trip across the USA and during that stay, Kantušer acquired American citizenship. This enabled him, now holding a passport, again to visit his country of birth. Also in 1966, for the first time one of his works (Evocations for Horn and Piano) was premiered and recorded in Slovenia. That same year, Éditions musicales transatlantiques (EMT) published the Symphony № 2. In 1968, Kantušer initiated and was one of the founding members of the B.I.M.C., a contemporary music international information center, now named after him. From then on the director of the BIMC, Kantušer devoted a large amount of time to this position which he remained in for more than thirty years.

In 1970, the Concert Overture was premiered in Nice under the direction of Jean-Jacques Werner, and Largo was premiered in Trieste by the Trio Musica Rara. The pianist of the trio was Leon Engelman with whom Kantušer began a lasting professional cooperation and friendship. In 1971, the Kantušers left Fontainebleau and returned to Paris, first living in the Bastille quarter, then Rue de Rome, and finally at the Cité internationale des arts where they stayed and where the couple met many artists. In the 1970s, the family often spent summers in Grožnjan, where they joined an artist colony that revived that Istrian town, and where the composer notably reconnected with his friend Karel Zelenko. EFM (Éditions françaises de musique) published the Cello Concerto, and in 1973, Kantušer signed his Third Symphony. Prelude and Fugue for organ was premiered by Georges Delvallée, to whom "How long…" was also dedicated, in 1974. In 1974-1975, in an effort of multi-centralization, Kantušer managed to open a BIMC center in Slovenia in collaboration with the National and University Library of Slovenia (NUK), in Kamnik, which led him often to travel between France and Slovenia. In 1976, he revised Symphony № 3 and wrote Letters to My Wife, for piano. In 1977, the Society of Slovene Composers (EDSS) published Two Images and Kantušer signed Coexistence № 1, which was premiered the same year in Opatija. In 1978, he organized a chamber music concert at the Cité internationale des arts in Paris (Edmond Michelet Hall), in a preview of a series of concerts entitled " Composers of our time". Also in 1978, the Suite for Percussions was premiered at the Festival of 20th Century chamber music in Radenci (Slovenia). This suite was choreographed in 1979 by Majna Sevnik for Slovenian television (RTV Slovenija) under the title Midsummer Night (Kresna noč).

In 1980, the Symphony № 3 was recorded for RTV Slovenija under the baton of Anton Nanut, and thanks to Leon Engelman, an extensive radio program dedicated to the composer was produced by RTV Slovenija, recordings of his works often being broadcast in Yugoslavia. In Paris, he met the author Godfrey Howard (Oxon) and the composer Griffith Rose. Signed in 1980, the String quartet № 4 was premiered by the Zagreb Quartet in 1981 and came out on a LP record. In 1981, Kantušer signed the Symphony № 4 but revised it in 1983. In addition to a series of concerts, the BIMC occasionally organized exhibitions and presentations of various musical institutions. The couple often visited Venice, and in 1983, Sketch, for organ, was premiered at the Sant'Agnese church by Georges Delvallée. In 1984 a grandson, Nicolas, was born in Berlin. In 1985 and 1986, the ballet Flamska Legenda (Flemish Legend) was given in Slovenia at the Maribor Opera, choreographed by Vlasto Dedović. In 1985, Kantušer wrote Eppur si muove for string orchestra, which was premiered in 1986 at the Cankar Hall in Ljubljana. In 1985, he had to admit the failure of the cooperation between the BIMC and NUK. Kantušer kept an apartment in Kamnik and left the house in Istria. In Kamnik, he often met the veterinarian Demeter Sadnikar, and he was also in contact with the art historian Jure Mikuž, who he met in Paris. Kantušer was in touch with the publisher Billaudot who took over EFM. Starting in 1986, he focussed on digitization of the BIMC files. In 1987, the Symphony № 4 was recorded in Ljubljana under the baton of Anton Nanut, and Épaves (Wrecks) was premiered. In 1988, Kantušer signed the last of his seven String Quartets. Towards the end of the decade, the couple made an artistic, tourist trip throughout Yugoslavia.

During the 1990s, Kantušer and Grace Renzi made several trips to the United States. They were in New York twice to organize the distribution of the BIMC directories, but also on a personal basis. Kantušer was a member of the American Composers Alliance, as well as a member of SACEM in France and SAZAS in Slovenia. In this decade, there were several publications and radio programs about the composer (notably on France 2), and three CD-ROMs including his works were stamped in Slovenia. He continued organizing concerts at the Cité internationale des arts, one of which, in 1992, was dedicated to the composer Sergiu Natra. In 1992, Kantušer signed a symphonic version of Épaves (Wrecks), which was recorded for RTV Slovenija in 1993. "Sarajevo", signed in 1993, was premiered in Vienna in 1995. The Concerto for Viola, Double Bass and Orchestra, written in 1994, was recorded in 1996 for RTV Slovenija. In 1996, on the occasion of his 75th birthday, a concert dedicated to Kantušer was held in Fresnes (Ferme de Cottinville). He was aware of the need for an expansion of the library's premises, and in this regard, he was in contact with Danièle Pistone at the Sorbonne. In 1997, on the occasion of a concert in honor of the composer at the Holywell Music Room - for the Festival of Contemporary Music in Oxford, the couple made a last trip together. In 1998, Kantušer entered into negotiations with the Slovene Ministry of Culture concerning the opening of a BIMC center in Slovenia. The talks were successful in 1999, Kantušer meeting the minister Jožef Školč and the town of Šmartno being chosen as the venue for the information center. On the other hand, talks with the BnF proved unsuccessful. Božidar Kantušer died on May 9, 1999, in a Paris hospital, after a cerebral infarct, at the age of 77.

Kantušer is buried in Paris at the Père Lachaise Cemetery, together with Grace Renzi (Kantuser) who died in 2011. The manuscripts of his works are kept at the Library of Congress. The opera "On Christmas Eve" is unfinished. The seven string quartets were published by Marc Lombard. Grace Renzi took care of the succession of the BIMC, and thanks to Dominique Hausfater, the collection is now at the Médiathèque Hector Berlioz at the Conservatoire de Paris.

== Music ==
List of compositions by Božidar Kantušer

== Sources ==
- Howard, Godfrey (1988). Paris: the essential city. Newton Abbot: David & Charles Publishers plc. ISBN 0-7153-9153-4.
- Križnar, Franc (1997). Sto slovenskih skladateljev. Ljubljana: Prešernova družba, Vrba. ISBN 961-6186-28-0.
- Neubauer, Henrik (2000). Vodnik po baletih slovenskih skladateljev. Ljubljana: Forma 7. ISBN 961-6181-21-1.
- Koter, Darja (2012). Slovenska glasba 1918 - 1991. Ljubljana: Študentska založba. ISBN 978-961-242-560-9.
- Guth, Paul; Jean-Marie Marcel (1954). L'académie imaginaire. Librairie Plon, Paris.
- Honegger, Marc (1970). Dictionnaire de la musique : les hommes et leurs œuvres volume 1. Bordas, Paris.
- Kovačević, Krešimir (1974). Muzička enciklopedija, volume 2 (2nd edition). Jugoslavenski leksikografski zavod, Zagreb.
- Klemenčič, Ivan (1988). Slovenski godalni kvartet (The Slovenian string quartet). Musicological Annual XXIV, Ljubljana.
- Javornik, Marjan; Dermastia, Alenka (1990). Enciklopedija Slovenije, volume 4. Založba Mladinska knjiga, Ljubljana.
- Karlin, Klemen (2003). Božidar Kantušer und sein Orgelwerk. Universität für Musik und darstellende Kunst, Wien.
