= Grace Renzi =

American painter (1922–2011)

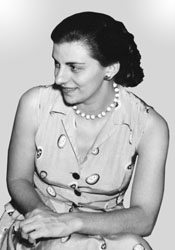
- Grace Renzi in 1952
- Born: 9 September 1922; New York City, US
- Died: 4 June 2011 (aged 88); Cachan, France
- Resting place: Père Lachaise Cemetery, Paris, France
- Education: Cooper Union, Queens College
- Known for: Painting, printmaking
- Movement: Abstraction
- Spouse: Božidar Kantušer

Grace Renzi (September 9, 1922 – June 4, 2011), married name Grace Kantuser, was an American painter.

Renzi graduated from Queens College and from the Cooper Union Art School, New York City. In 1953, she relocated to Paris, France, where she lived for the rest of her life. Grace Renzi was a painter, and a printmaker. Her art is part of collections (public or private) and galleries, and has been exhibited throughout the world in solo shows, group shows, and 'salons' on a regular basis. She was married to the composer Božidar Kantušer. She is buried at the Père Lachaise Cemetery in Paris.

== Life ==
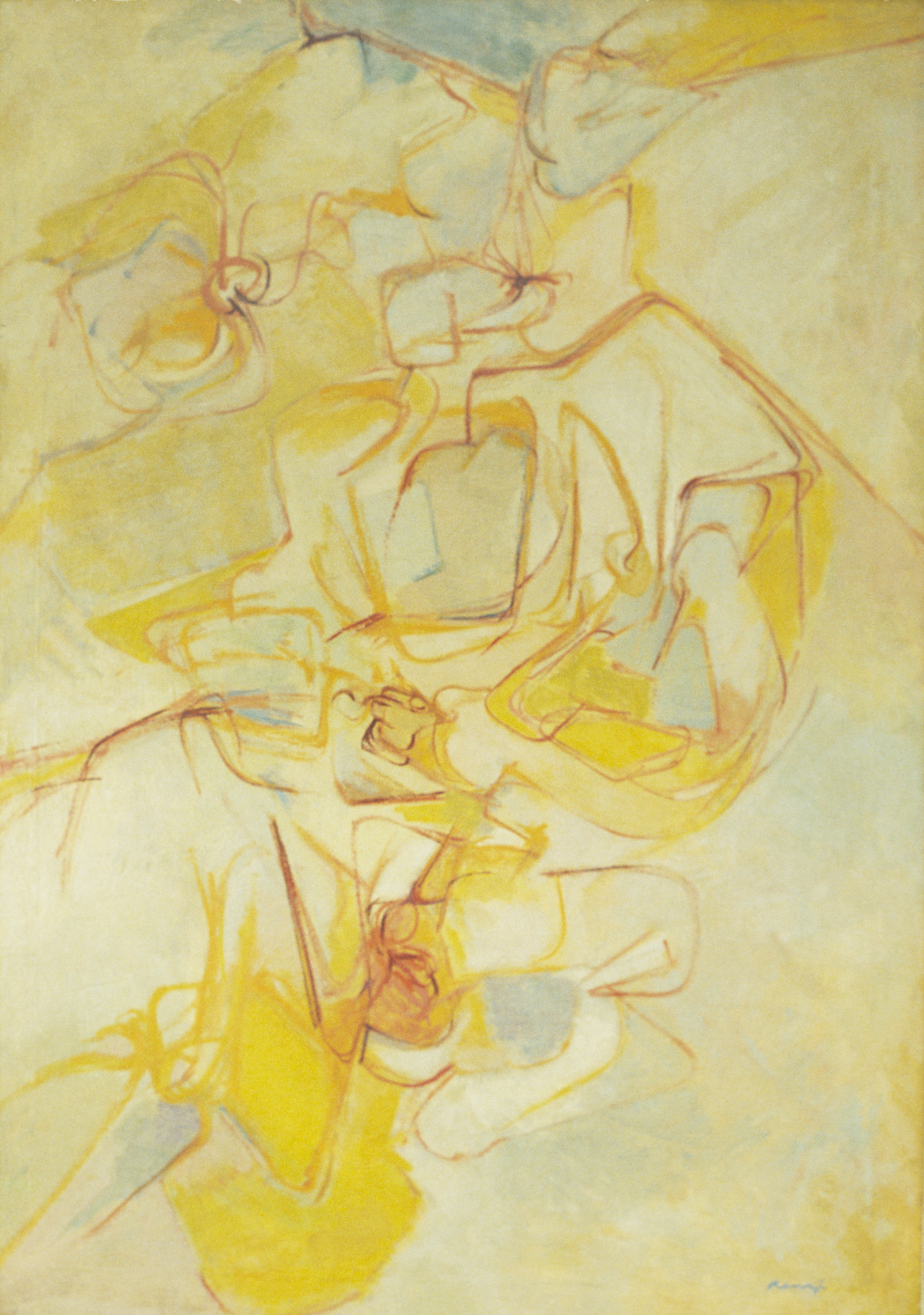
Joy of Sunshine (1951, New York), by Grace Renzi

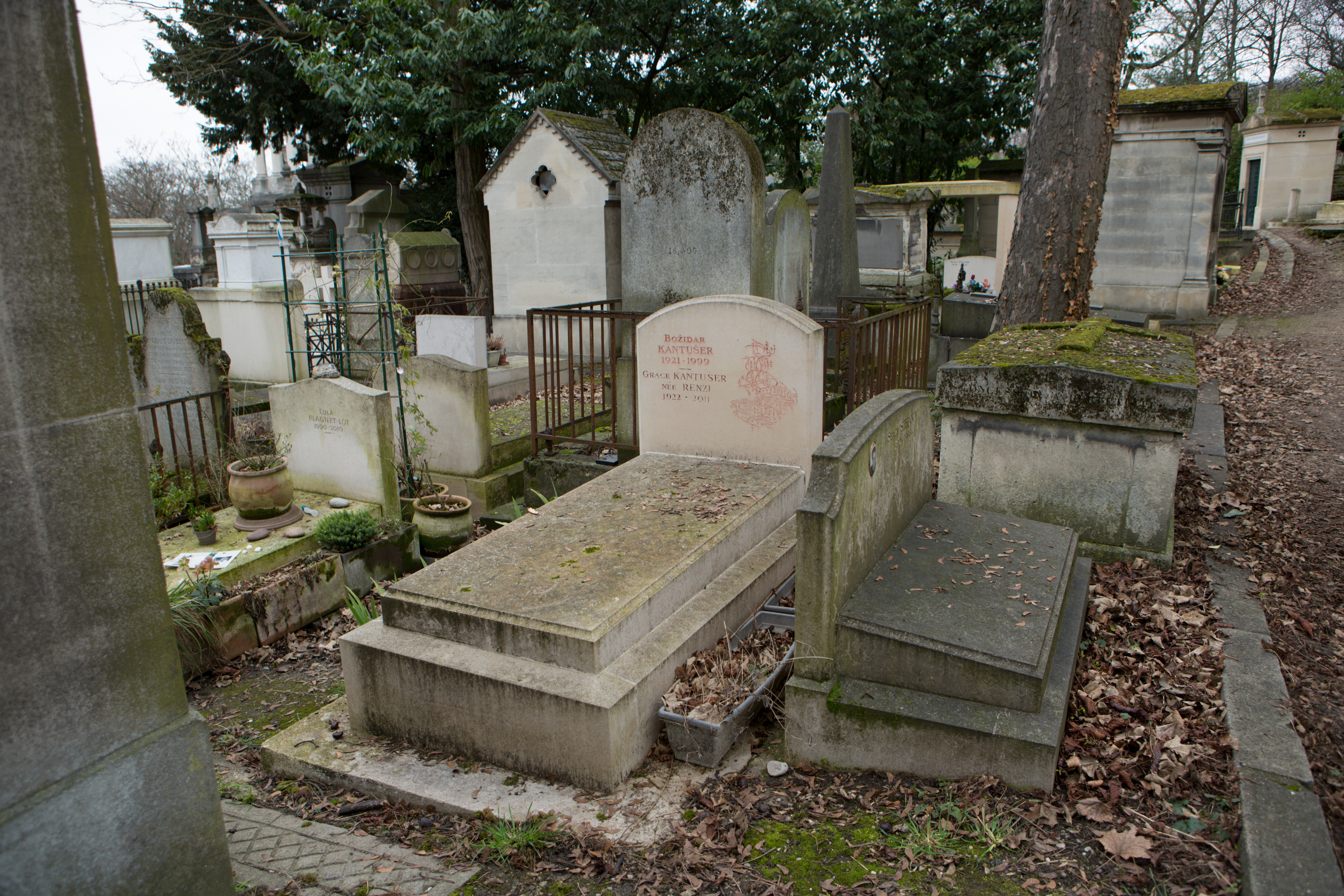
The tomb of Grace Renzi and Božidar Kantušer in Père-Lachaise Cemetery.

Grace Renzi was born on September 9, 1922, in New York, in the borough of Queens, very close to the East River. She was the last of the eleven children of Michael (Michelangelo) Renzi and his wife Lucy, born Lucia Viscusi. The parents, both from farmer families from the Province of Benevento in Italy, had settled in New York around 1900. The mother was a housewife and the father a laborer. In 1923, the family moved near Belmont Park, still in Queens. The Great Depression did not affect Renzi too much and she enjoyed an education followed by her older sisters, several of whom were teachers. Renzi had the opportunity to draw and paint at will since childhood, which she devoted herself to. She was always an excellent pupil and received scholarships throughout her education.

In 1940, at the age of eighteen, Renzi entered Cooper Union. After one year at Cooper, she decided in 1941 to study first at Queens College, where she worked for instance with Vaclav Vytlacil, and Robert Goldwater in the history of art. In 1944, Renzi graduated cum laude. After the end of World War II, Renzi returned to Cooper Union where she studied notably with Mrs and Mr Harrison, Morris Kantor and Nicholas Marsicano. She graduated in 1948, cum laude, and also took advantage of Hans Hofmann's teaching, though briefly. Renzi exhibited in shows and group exhibitions, especially in New York (see the hidden box at the bottom of the page). Determined to visit the museums of Europe, she works to finance this project. Renzi taught art history at Hofstra University in 1950–51 and was also an assistant at Cooper.

In 1951, Renzi went to Cuba and stayed there one year. While teaching, she discovers the island and mingled with the arts community, thus meeting Wifredo Lam and his artistic universe. The first solo exhibition of Renzi's work took place in Havana, followed by another one in 1952. Back to New York and having gotten over hepatitis, she teaches again to finance her trip to Europe. She arrived in Paris in September 1953 and got to know the artistic milieu of the time. In Montparnasse, Renzi met the Slovenian composer Božidar Kantušer who became her husband. The couple moved to the République quarter. In 1955, their son Borut was born. That same year, Renzi participates in a group exhibition at the Galerie du Dragon, her first exhibition in Paris. During the winter of 1956–57, Renzi went to New York after her mother died. In 1957, back in France and in order to support the family, she took a full-time job in a U.S. Army school in Bordeaux. The first solo exhibition in Europe of Renzi's works took place in Bordeaux. In 1958, Renzi exhibited in Paris at the gallery L'Antipoète, notably alongside Jean-Michel Atlan, Jean Fautrier, Hans Hartung, Serge Poliakoff and Sigismond Kolos-Vary. At the end of 1958, the family moved to Fontainebleau, where Renzi continued with her teaching job.

In 1962, Renzi participated in the exhibition "Donner à voir 2" at the Galerie Creuze in Paris, which was accompanied by a review by José Pierre. This exhibition included the following painters: Eva Aeppli, Joyce Mansour, Mimi Parent, Grace Renzi, Sabine, Niki de Saint Phalle, Toyen, Ursula, and Mary Wilson. During the 1960s, the Fontainebleau years, Renzi had quite a spacious atelier and while enjoying the closeness of nature, she was able to stay in touch with the cultural life of the capital. From 1962 on, she exhibited regularly in various Parisian salons. In 1964, a solo exhibition of works by Renzi at the Marie-Jacqueline Dumay gallery, in Paris, was accompanied by a text, "L'Inespéré" by Jean-Clarence Lambert. Renzi also kept in touch with her family in the United States, making and receiving visits. In 1968 her first exhibition in Yugoslavia took place in Portorož. In 1969, Renzi co-organized an exhibition at the B.I.M.C., at the villa Lavaurs in Fontainebleau. This exhibition notably included Roberto Altmann, John Christoforou, Pranas Gailius, Jacques Hérold, Sigismond Kolos-Vary, Wifredo Lam, Grace Renzi, Emil Wachter and Karel Zelenko, and was encouraged by Jean Bouret in Les Lettres Françaises. In 1969, Renzi began teaching at the Marymount International School, in Neuilly.

In 1970, Renzi was invited to participate in two exhibitions in Yugoslavia, in Rijeka and Piran. During the 1970s, the family spent the summers in Grožnjan, where they joined a colony of artists that brought this Istrian town back to life. Renzi participates in group exhibitions by Grožnjan artists, in Grožnjan itself and also in Piran or Subotica. In 1971, the Kantušers left Fontainebleau and returned to Paris, living first in the Bastille quarter, then Rue de Rome. In 1972, Renzi had a solo exhibition at the American Center, in Paris, and in 1972 and 1973, she projected stained glass windows for the Monpazier chapel, in the southwest of France. From 1973 to 1976, Renzi was a resident at the Cité internationale des arts in Paris where the couple met many artists. In 1974, in Paris, the Christiane Colin gallery presents Renzi with a solo exhibition. A text by Jacques Hérold about Renzi's work enriches the invitation, and a review by Jean Bouret appears in Les Nouvelles littéraires. Starting in 1976, the couple Kantušer Renzi is housed in an annex of the Cité of Art, on the quays of the Seine, in the B.I.M.C. residence. Renzi has an atelier there, though smaller than in the past. In 1979, she organized a solo exhibition of her works at the BIMC gallery and also received the Art Directors Club Merit Award. The same year, she participated in a group exhibition at the Koryo gallery in Paris, notably in the company of Ung No Lee. During the decade, she exhibited in more than twenty salons and group exhibitions in the United States and Europe.

In 1980, the Koryo gallery presented Renzi's recent paintings. The artist co-organized exhibitions at the BIMC gallery, and also exhibited her own work. During the 1980s, Renzi had ten solo exhibitions, two of which dedicated to her prints, in Kamnik, Ljubljana, Nantes, Paris, Salzburg and Venice. Besides painting, throughout the 1980s, Renzi devoted much of her time to printmaking, then mostly working in the Cité des Arts printmaking workshop. She exhibited regularly in painting and printmaking salons, and participated in many group exhibitions in Denmark, England, France in Nantes, Paris and Perpignan, Germany, Japan, Spain, the United States and Yugoslavia in Slovenia. Renzi stopped teaching in 1982, and the couple traveled extensively, often visiting Venice, Slovenia and Croatia, but also Vienna. In 1982, a solo exhibition was held at the gallery Veronika in Kamnik. Thanks to the BIMC, Renzi also had an atelier in Kamnik, but did not use it much. She presented her works in Venice with two solo exhibitions hosted by critic Enzo Di Martino, at the Segno Grafico center in 1981 and at the gallery Il Traghetto in 1984. In 1984, her grandson Nicolas was born in Berlin. In 1986, after the death of Malik Oussekine, Renzi began a series of works dedicated to this tragedy, on canvas and paper. On the other hand, she was awarded three art prizes: in 1987, the Prix Michel de Ghelderode, and in 1988, the Prijs voor Marineschilderen in Antwerp and the Prize "Do Forni" in'Venice. Renzi took part in the Ljubljana Biennial of Graphic Arts in 1987 (she participated regularly until 1995). In 1988, a solo exhibition of paintings by Renzi was held at the Museum of Modern Art in Ljubljana. Towards the end of the decade, in addition to a trip to New York in 1989, Renzi continued to travel in Europe, including an artistic, tourist trip throughout Yugoslavia with Kantušer and the Hoffschir couple.

In 1990, Renzi was pleased to be awarded the title of Bailli d'Honneur de Lalande-de-Pomerol. By the early 1990s, Renzi was a member of the printmaking atelier Bo Halbirk in Paris, and her works were part of the workshop's exhibitions. She also continued to participate in exhibitions of the Cité des Arts printmaking workshop. Also in 1990, Renzi was interviewed for academic purposes by Aulikki Eromäki and Ingrid Wagner, whereupon the artist had the opportunity to give a lecture at the Berlin University of the Arts in 1991, as part of her participation in the exhibition "Im Unterschied" at the NGBK. Renzi had turned to acrylics in her work on canvas during the 1980s, but then switched back to oil, now treating the layers differently. During the 1990s, she had five solo exhibitions, in Cuxhaven, Fresnes and Paris, and her work was included in permanent collections in Cuxhaven, Guangzhou, Maastricht, New York and Sarcelles. During this decade, Renzi's work appears in more than thirty-five group exhibitions or salons, in Berlin, Chennevières-sur-Marne, Fredrikstad, Grenoble, La Villedieu, Ljubljana, Maastricht, Nantes, New York, Paris, Sarcelles and Ville-d'Avray. Renzi participated in several books, etchings of hers being for instance part of "Épaves" (driftwood) by Daniel des Brosses, poems that also inspired Kantušer. The Kantuser couple often visited the United States during the decade, staying in New York with their friend Betty Statler (12th Street). In 1997, the couple was received in Oxford by Godfrey Howard (Oxon) and Françoise Legrand. That year she exhibited at the Anita Shapolsky Gallery. In 1999, Mary Anne Rose made an interview with Renzi for academic purposes. Božidar Kantušer died suddenly in May 1999.

Renzi stopped painting after the death of her husband. She lived alone for the next ten years. Thanks to her, and through the Embassy of the United States in Paris, the manuscript scores of Kantušer are preserved at the Library of Congress. In 2000, she exhibited her works in a solo exhibition in Grožnjan, studio Porton, on the occasion of a tribute to Kantušer. In 2001, she co-organized a group exhibition at the Hofstra University Museum in New York, including two of her own paintings. Renzi had an original engraving chiseled on Kantušer's grave at the Père Lachaise cemetery. In 2002, she organized a retrospective of fifty years of her work at the BIMC gallery. Renzi appeared in the film "Voyage musical en Slovénie" (2004) by François Goetghebeur and in a film made in Paris by Chen Tan (2004–05). In 2004 and 2005, no longer having an atelier at her disposal, she sold all her paintings with the exception of recent works (1990s), at two auctions at the Hôtel Drouot. She presented the series of works dedicated to Malik Oussekine at a solo exhibition in 2007, in Givors, where the works were sold at an auction for the benefit of painting workshops for children from disadvantaged neighborhoods. Here Renzi's work is deliberately figurative, expressionist, while overall, her work was generally considered abstract. During the decade, she went alone to visit museums in Spain, and also spent a summer in Denmark in 2007, in residence at the Kirsten Kjaers Museum. In 2008 and 2009, although then walking with difficulty, she enjoyed spending a day in Deauville or Giverny, taking the train.

After her loss of autonomy in 2010, Renzi entered the nursing home Cousin de Méricourt in Cachan. Grace Renzi (Grace Kantuser) died June 4, 2011, in Cachan, at the age of 88. She is buried alongside her husband at the Père Lachaise cemetery in Paris. Her work is represented in permanent/public collections in China, France, Germany, Italy, Japan, the Netherlands, Slovenia and the United States. Renzi works are part of private collections in America and Europe.

== Sources ==
- Howard, Godfrey (1988). Paris: the essential city. Newton Abbot: David & Charles Publishers plc. ISBN 0-7153-9153-4.
- Zelenko, Rok (2011). Grožnjan = Grisignana : istrian town of artists. Pula: Slovensko kulturno društvo Istra <etc.>. OCLC 813593104.
- Eromäki, Aulikki; Wagner, Ingrid (2002): Weiblichkeit und ästhetisches Handeln bei zeitgenössischen bildenden Künstlerinnen 1975 bis 1990. Berlin University of the Arts, Berlin. http://opus4.kobv.de/opus4-udk/frontdoor/index/index/year/2002/docId/9
- Rose, Mary Anne (2005): Expatriate experience and American women artists: creative lives and creative work in context. Columbia University Teachers College, New York. AAT 3175720

== Exhibitions and collections ==
List of exhibitions and collections

List of exhibitions of Grace Renzi's works, from 1948 to 2007, followed by a list of permanent collections including Grace Renzi's works.
The list of exhibitions was established referring to the artist's documentation and catalogs, as well as to publications concerning the artist.
The solo exhibitions are set in boldface.

Exhibitions:

1948

- Idella La Vista, New York.
- Seligman Gallery ("Under 25"), New York.
- National Academy Annual, New York.

1949

- Idella La Vista, New York.
- Ward Eggleston Gallery, New York.
- Whitney Annual, Whitney Museum, New York.
- Audubon Show, New York.
- Addison Gallery of American Art ("25 Art Schols, U.S.A."), Andover, Massachusetts.

1950

- Idella La Vista, New York.
- Contemporary Arts Gallery, New York.

1951

- **Lyceum**, Havana.

1952

- **Instituto Cultural Cubano-Norteamericano**, Havana.

1955

- Galerie du Dragon, Paris.

1958

- **American Cultural Center**, Bordeaux.
- City gallery of Fine Arts, Bordeaux.
- Galerie L'Antipoète, Paris.

1962

- Salon d'Automne, Paris.
- Galerie Creuze, Paris.

1963

- Galerie Weiller, Paris.
- The Lighthouse Queens Center, New York.
- Galerie du Ranelagh, Paris.

1964

- **Galerie Marie-Jacqueline Dumay**, Paris.

1965

- Salon Comparaisons, Paris.

1966

- Salon Comparaisons, Paris.
- **Fontainebleau Theater**, Fontainebleau.

1967

- Maison de la Culture, Le Havre.
- Salon Comparaisons, Paris. (?)

1968

- Maison de la Culture, Le Havre.
- **Mala Galerija**, Portorož.

1969

- Maison de la Culture, Le Havre.
- B.I.M.C., Villa Lavaurs, Fontainebleau.

1970

- Maison de la Culture, Le Havre.
- Moderna Galerija, Rijeka.
- Gallery of the city of Piran, "Artists of Grožnjan", Piran.

1971

- **Marymount School**, Neuilly.
- Maison de la Culture, Le Havre.
- **Gallery Čuk**, Grožnjan. From 1971 to 1978.

1972

- Gallery of the city of Piran, "Artists of Grožnjan", Piran.
- **American Center** (Blvd Raspail), Paris.

1973

- Salon Grands et Jeunes d'Aujourd'hui, Paris.
- Stained glass windows for the Monpazier chapel, Monpazier.
- Cité internationale des arts, Annual exhibition, Paris. Starting in 1973 and until the 2000s, Renzi participated in nearly all the yearly group exhibitions at the Cité des arts.
- **Atelier of the Society of Slovenian composers** (DSS), Ljubljana.
- Exhibition of the artists of Grožnjan, Grožnjan.

1974

- **Galerie Christiane Colin**, Paris.
- Salon Comparaisons, Paris.

1975

- Exhibition for the "10 years of Grožnjan", Grožnjan.
- Ron Michels Gallery, Toledo, Ohio.

1976

- The American Library, Brussels.
- Church stained glass windows, Moissac.

1977

- XV. likovni susret (artists of Grožnjan), Subotica.

1978

- Salon Comparaisons, Paris.
- **Gallery Čuk**, Grožnjan. From 1971 to 1978.

1979

- Art Directors Club 58th Annual Exhibition, New York.
- **B.I.M.C. gallery**, Paris.
- Galerie Koryo, Paris.

1980

- **Galerie Koryo**, Paris.
- Salon La Lettre et le Signe, Paris.

1981

- BIMC gallery, Paris.
- **Segno Grafico**, Venice.
- **BIMC gallery**, Paris.
- Istituto Italiano di Cultura, Paris.
- Pompidou Centre, "Témpoignages", Paris.
- FNAC Forum, "L´Art de la Litho" (Atelier Pons), Paris.

1982

- **Gallery Veronika**, Kamnik.
- Cité internationale des arts, Paris, exhibition of the "Cité ex" and exhibition of the print workshop.
- Salon Ecritures, Paris.
- Salon La Lettre et le Signe, Paris.
- BIMC gallery, Paris.

1983

- **BIMC gallery**, Paris. (retrospective – 30 years)
- BIMC gallery, Paris.
- Gallery Le Soleil Bleu, "Mosaïque", Paris.
- Les Editions des Prouvaires, Longjumeau.
- Cité des Arts, Le Trait (printmakers society), Paris.

1984

- **Centre Roger Portugal**, Nantes.
- **Gallery Il Traghetto**, Venice.

1985

- **Ateliergalerie Nonntal**, Salzburg.

1986

- **Galerie Pensée sauvage**, Paris.
- Cité des Arts, Paris, print workshop.
- Salon Comparaisons, Paris.
- Leipziger Grafik Börse, Leipzig. ?

1987

- Seneres on Sixth, New York.
- Cité des arts, Paris, exhibition of the "Cité ex" and exhibition of the print workshop.
- Salon d'Automne, Paris.
- BIMC gallery, Paris.
- Biennial of Graphic Arts, Ljubljana.
- ?, Humberside.

1988

- BIMC gallery, Paris.
- Royal Academy of Fine Arts, Antwerp.
- **Museum of Modern Art** (Mala Galerija), Ljubljana.
- Maximo Ramos, Ferrol.
- Salon International de Gravure, Nantes.
- Biennale de Gravure, Perpignan.
- SAGA, Paris. (stand J. de Champvallins)

1989

- Lyngby Kunstforening, Denmark (atelier Bo Halbirk).
- Likovno poletje, Kranj.
- Biennial of Graphic Arts, Ljubljana.
- Kanagawa Prefectural Gallery, Yokohama.
- Cité des Arts, Paris, exhibition of the print workshop.

1990

- CRAC, Grenoble.
- Anita Shapolsky Gallery, "The Expanding Figurative Imagination", New York.
- **Galerie Artica**, Cuxhaven.
- **Galerie Vieille du Temple**, Paris. ("Épaves" book signature)
- La Villedieu (Versailles), "Le Livre gravé".
- Biennale de Gravure, Sarcelles.
- Salon International de Gravure, Nantes.

1991

- NGBK, Berlin.
- Biennial of Graphic Arts, Ljubljana.
- Art Majeur, Paris.

1992

- Cité des Arts, "Le Trait", Paris.
- SAGA, Paris. (stand S. Combescot)
- Biennale de Gravure, Sarcelles.
- Biennale de Gravure, Maastricht.

1993

- Biennial of Graphic Arts, Ljubljana.
- Salon de Mai, Paris.
- Salon de la Gravure, Ville-d'Avray.

1994

- Salon d'Automne, Paris.
- Hôtel Scipion, Paris, "Le Trait".
- Travelling print exhibition, Denmark.

1995

- Cité des Arts, Paris, print workshop.
- **BIMC gallery**, Paris. "Memoire de Paris".
- Anita Shapolsky Gallery, "The Fifties", New York.
- Biennial of Graphic Arts, Ljubljana.
- Triennial of Printmaking, Fredrikstad.
- Salon de Mai, Paris.
- Ancienne Mairie, Chennevières-sur-Marne.

1996

- Salon de Mai, Paris.
- Salon des Réalités Nouvelles, Paris.
- Galerie Graphes, Paris. (98?)
- **BIMC gallery**, Paris. (recent prints)
- **Ferme de Cottinville**, Fresnes. (recent prints)

1997

- Shapolsky Gallery, New York.
- Salon d'Automne (section printmaking), Paris.
- Cité des Arts, Paris, Le Mois de L'Estampe.
- Salon de Gravure, Sarcelles.

1998

- Guangdong Museum of Art, "European Prints", Guangzhou.
- Galerie Graphes, Paris.
- Salon Comparaisons, Paris.
- Cité des Arts, Paris, Le Mois de L'Estampe.
- SAGA, Paris. (stand J. de Champvallins)

2000

- **Studio Porton**, Grožnjan.
- Grafisk Blade, Parijs – Denemarken – Brussel. (atelier Bo Halbirk)
- Salon Comparaisons, Paris.

2001

- Emily Lowe Gallery, Hofstra University Museum, New York.
- Salon Comparaisons, Paris.

2002

- **BIMC gallery**, Paris. (retrospective – 50 years)
- Salon Comparaisons, Paris.

2003

- Salon d'Automne (section painting), Paris.
- Gallery Épreuves d'Artistes, Antwerp. (atelier Bo Halbirk)
- Skovhuset – Contemporary Art Center, Copenhagen. (atelier Bo Halbirk)
- Galerie Ellen Friling, Copenhagen. (atelier Bo Halbirk)

2004

- Espace Camille Claudel, Charenton-le-Pont. (atelier Bo Halbirk)
- Espace Jean Legendre, Compiègne. (atelier Bo Halbirk)

2006

- Médiathèque Hector Berlioz, Music ant printmaking project (with Torben Bo Halbirk and Anne Sahli), Paris.
- Cité des Arts, Exposition d'Estampes, Paris. (atelier Bo Halbirk)

2007

- **Amis des Arts**, Conservatory, Givors.

Collections:

- Guangdong Museum of Art, Guangzhou, China.
- Artothèque Legendre, Compiègne, France.
- Atelier Bo Halbirk, Paris, France.
- Galerie Darga-Lansberg, Paris, France.
- La Libre Errance (Galerie Graphes), Paris, France.
- Mairie de Sarcelles, Sarcelles, France.
- Galerie Artica, Cuxhaven, Germany.
- Centre International de Gravure (Venezia Viva), Venice, Italy.
- Kanagawa Prefectural Gallery, Yokohama, Japan.
- Maastricht International Museum, Maastricht, Netherlands.
- Society of Slovenian composers, Ljubljana, Slovenia.
- Gallery Anita Shapolsky, New York, United States.
- Hofstra Museum, New York, United States.
