= Benoît Delbecq =

French pianist and composer (born 1966)

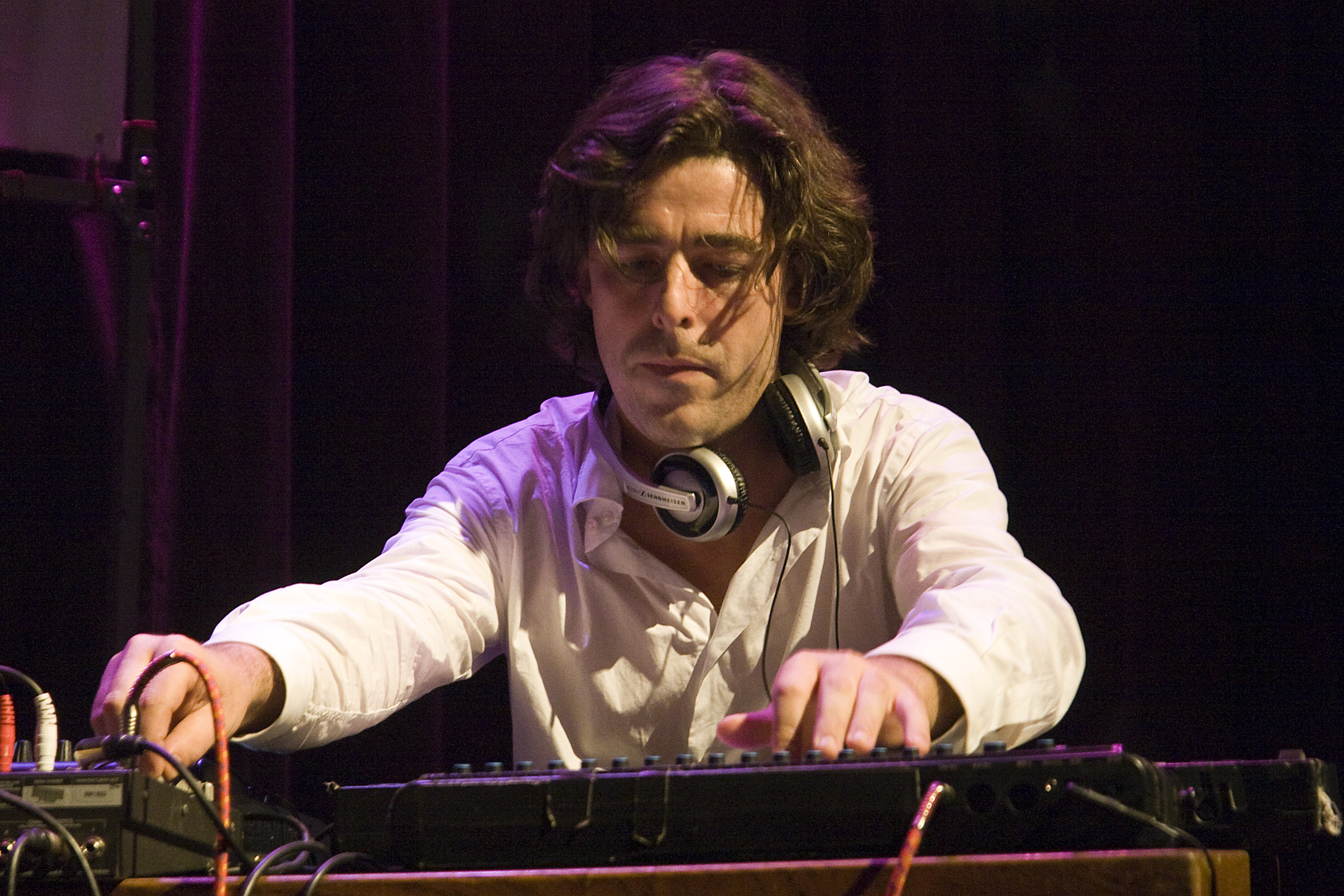
- Benoît Delbecq performing in Paris, 2007

Background information
- Born: 6 June 1966 (age 60); Saint-Germain-en-Laye, France
- Genres: Jazz
- Occupation: Musician
- Instrument: Piano
- Website: delbecq.net

Benoît Delbecq (born 6 June 1966) is a French pianist and composer.

== Early life ==
Benoît Delbecq was born in Saint-Germain-en-Laye, and raised in a musical environment. He started studying piano in Bougival at the age of seven with Nicolle Mollard, a former student of Alfred Cortot. He first studied jazz harmony with parisian pianist Jean-Pierre Fouquey, then joined IACP in Paris (in 1982), a jazz and improvised music school founded and directed by bassist Alan Silva, while he continued high school and furthermore sound engineering studies. In 1983 he met Mal Waldron who encouraged him to work on his own music. As he had become an assistant director for films as well as an assistant in sound engineering, Delbecq finally opted to become a professional musician after attending the Banff Centre Jazz Workshop, Canada, in the summer of 1987, where he studied with Dave Holland, Steve Coleman and Muhal Richard Abrams among others. He then studied composition and music analysis with Solange Ancona at the Versailles National Conservatory, studied with pianist Georges Delvallée at Cachan Conservatory. Together with saxophonist Guillaume Orti from France, he went back again to the Banff Jazz workshop in the summer of 1990 where he studied under the direction of Steve Coleman. There he met peers like pianists Ethan Iverson and Andy Milne, saxophonists Tony Malaby and Jorrit Dijsktra, and trumpeter Ralph Alessi among others, as well as British drummer Steve Argüelles, a long-term collaborator.

== Awards ==
Benoît was awarded the Prix Jeunes Affiches de la Sacem in 1995 (with collective Kartet). He was also awarded the Prix de la Villa Médicis Hors les Murs in 2001, the Civitella Foundation (NY) fellowship in 2009, and the Prix Beaumarchais (with playwright Dorothée Zumstein) in 2017. Both The Sixth Jump and Circles and Calligrams (songlines) were awarded a Grand Prix International de l'Académie Charles Cros in 2010,
