= Ramette =

Ramette is a surname. Notable people with the surname include:

- Arthur Ramette (1897–1988), French politician
- Elise Ramette (born 1998), Belgian basketball player
- Yves Ramette (1921–2012), French composer
