= Lycée Frédéric Mistral =

Lycée Frédéric Mistral may refer to:

- Cité scolaire Frédéric-Mistral in Avignon
- Lycée Frédéric Mistral in Fresnes, Val-de-Marne
- Lycée Frédéric Mistral (Marseille) in Marseille
- Lycée Frédéric Mistral (Nîmes) in Nîmes
