= Library Božidar Kantušer =

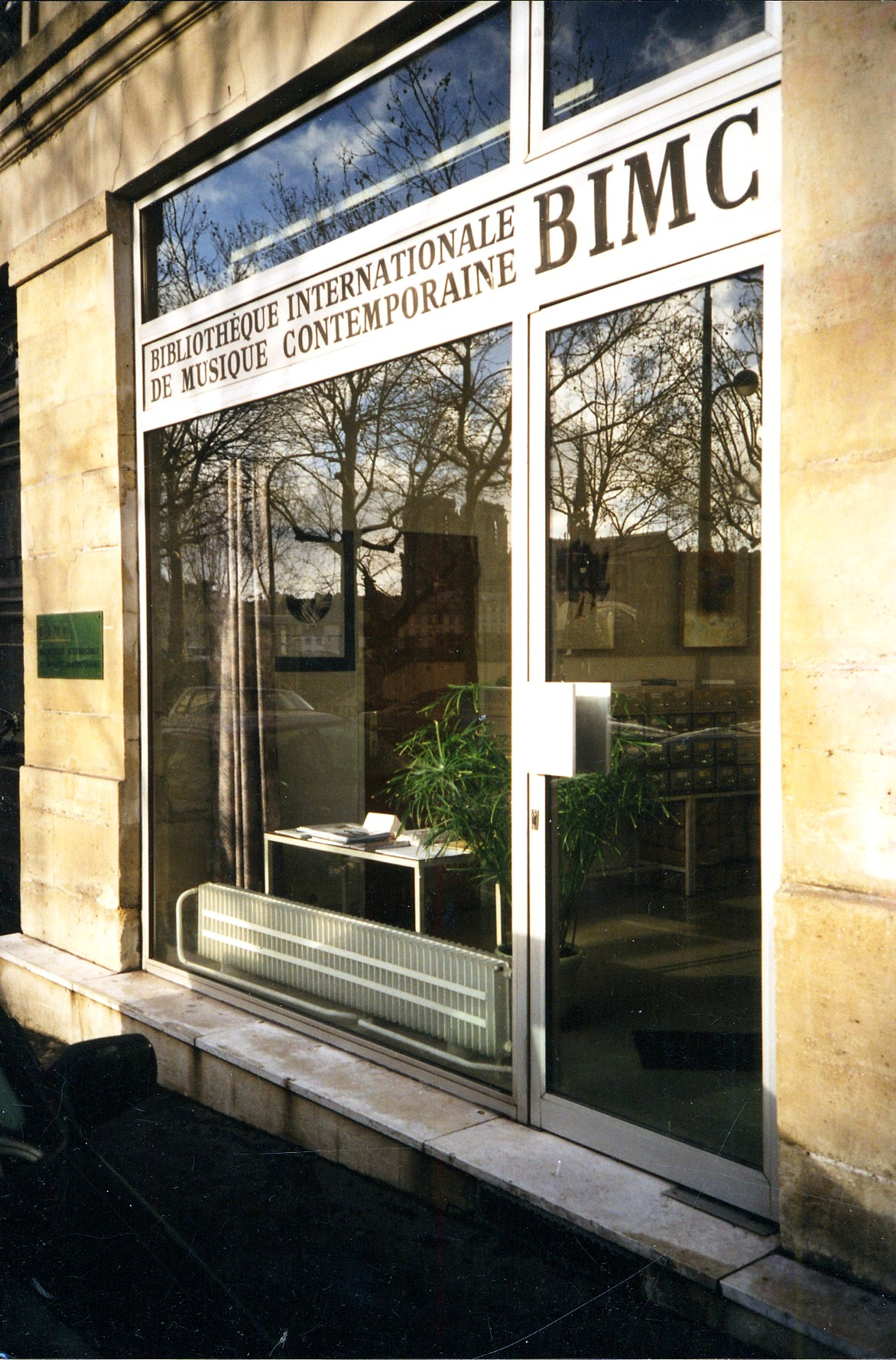
Facade of the B.I.M.C. (until 2002)

The Library Božidar Kantušer, formerly known as International Library of Contemporary Music (in French: Bibliothèque Internationale de Musique Contemporaine, B.I.M.C.), was a non-profit association chartered under the French 1901 Law on associations. It was created in 1968 to promote contemporary music by facilitating access to published and unpublished scores from around the world. For this purpose, the library centralizes (without aesthetic bias) and lists the scores, and then facilitates their discovery by computerized means. At its inception the association was subsidized by the City of Fontainebleau and the French Ministry of Culture, further by the City of Paris and the Ministry of Culture. Since 2006, the collection of scores and recordings (more than 24,500 documents in 2012) is available in Paris at the Médiathèque Hector Berlioz and through its OPAC.

== Goals ==
« The dispersion of scores of music of our time among publishers throughout the world (and especially the fact that most of them remain in the form of manuscripts) represents an almost insurmountable obstacle for anyone wishing to obtain an exact idea of contemporary music production. Only an association of the persons actually concerned, that is to say the composers and music publishers themselves, supported by musicians and other music professionals could overcome this problem. » (Excerpt from a B.I.M.C. bulletin)

== Means ==
=== Centralization and computerization ===
To allow the consultation of the deposited works and to establish the database necessary for the distribution of information, the library proposes to centralize the published and unpublished works of contemporary music (from the twentieth century on) and their recordings. The deposit of scores and recordings is open to all composers, without aesthetic bias, to the exclusion of pieces solely dedicated to education. The library regularly stimulates composers and publishers in depositing their works, emphasizing the promotional importance of such a deposit. In an effort of multi-centralization, of creating various consultation sites, for a few years composers and publishers were asked to submit several copies of each score. Cooperation talks were underway with the Lincoln Center, and the effort was carried out in the form of a second center in Slovenia from 1975 to 1985 (the idea was revived in 1999, then abandoned).

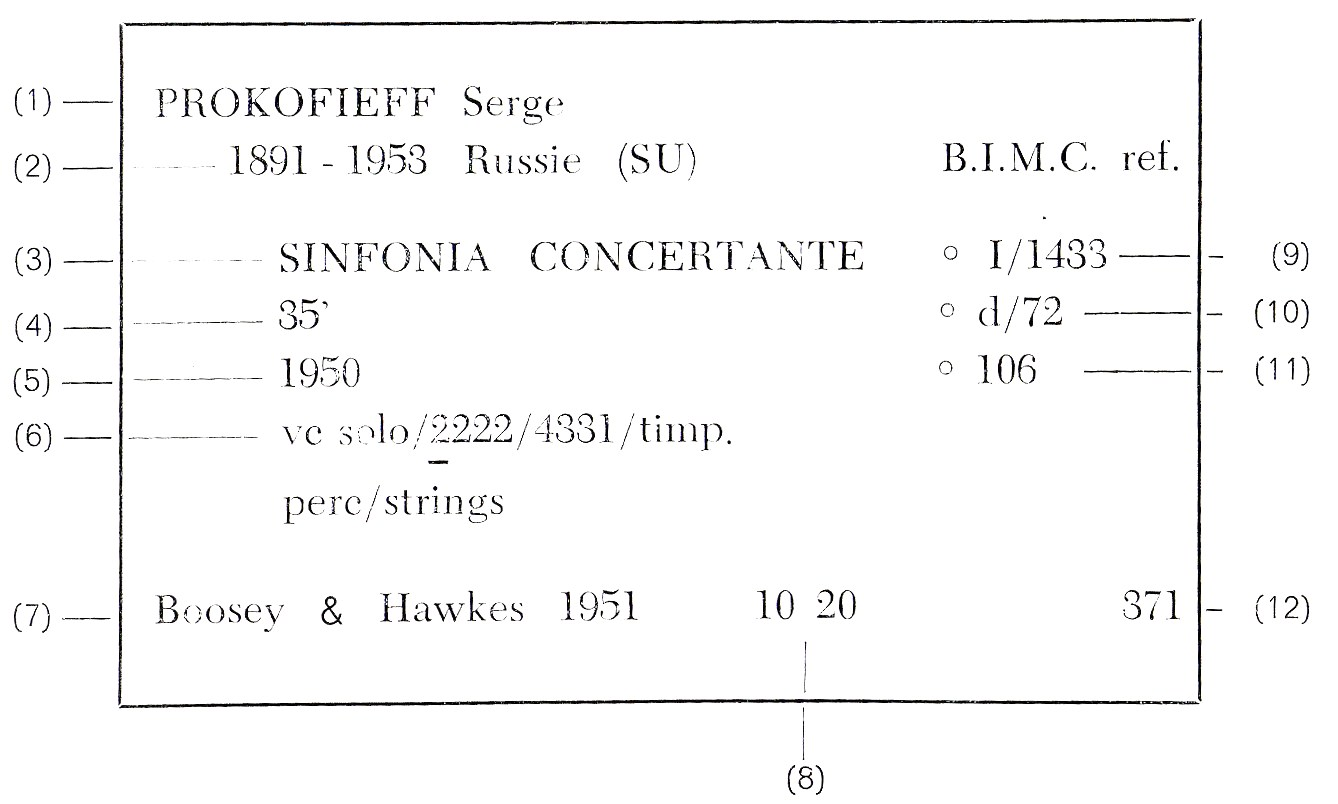
Annotated example of a B.I.M.C. index card

For each submitted work, an index card was established and printed numerously. To allow multiple filing of each index card, the database for each deposited score contained the following information: name and surname of the composer, year and country of birth as well as nationality, title of the work, duration, year of composition, instrumentation (nomenclature), possibly the publisher and the year of publication. Subsequently the data appeared in printed directories, and was eventually entered on the site of the Médiathèque Hector Berlioz. In addition, a biographical file is opened for each composer and made accessible. All information often not being specified in the scores, one of the major tasks of the association is to obtain all the data needed to establish an entry.

=== Diffusion of information ===
The distribution of data permitting objective and comprehensive information on contemporary works of music is done nowadays online through the OPAC of the Hector Berlioz Mediathèque. Previously, printed directories, presented in two volumes - one classified by instrumentation, the other in alphabetical order of composers, were regularly updated, reprinted and sent to subscribers around the world. They held and still hold an important place in music libraries (academic or public) in the United States, Canada, Europe, Australia and Japan. Initially (starting 1968), the diffusion of information was done by sending card catalogs to subscribers, allowing multiple approaches and regular updates. The seven card catalogs offered to subscription were ordered alphabetically by composer name, by instrumentation, by nationality and alphabetically, by nationality and instrumentation, by the duration of the work, by year of composition, by publisher (unpublished works by instrumentation). One same index card, printed numerously and corresponding to one score, appeared in seven different card catalogs, allowing to discover each work by seven different accesses. Interested parties subscribed to one or more card catalog of their choice, updating their catalogs as and when new cards were shipped. Index cards were shipped to subscribers as new works were deposited in the library.

== History ==
At its inception in 1968, composers such as Henri Dutilleux, André Jolivet, Darius Milhaud and Henri Sauguet gave their written support to the library. It also received a favorable press release, particularly in Les Lettres Françaises, or with Combat welcoming the fortunate initiative. Many musical institutions from around the world soon began to follow with interest the development of the association. The first headquarters of the B.I.M.C. was in Fontainebleau. It was situated on the first floor of the Villa Lavaurs, the basement housing technical services such as a recording studio and a press. In the early 1970s the headquarters was transferred to Paris. Until 2002, the library was situated along the Seine, on two floors of an annex to the Cité internationale des arts, and then moved to the CNR conservatory, rue de Madrid. Since 2006 the library is part of the Mediathèque Hector Berlioz at the Conservatoire de Paris. It was renamed Library Božidar Kantušer in honor of the composer Božidar Kantušer, one of its founding members and its director from 1968 to 1999. The other founding members of the association are Léon Barzin, Louis-Noël Belaubre, Jacques Phytilis, Jean-Jacques Werner, Pierre Wissmer, Didier Duclos.

== See also ==
- List of libraries in France

== Sources ==
- IAML Electronic Newsletter No. 31, April 2009 - analysis by Dominique Hausfater.
- Review by Dominique Hausfater (or here on wayback): Conference IAML-IAMIC-IASA 2006 (paragraph 4) for the IAML French group.
- Presentation of the Library Božidar Kantušer, on the Médiathèque Hector Berlioz site.
