= Hôtel de Ville, Fresnes, Val-de-Marne =

Town hall in Fresnes, Val-de-Marne, France

Hôtel de Ville
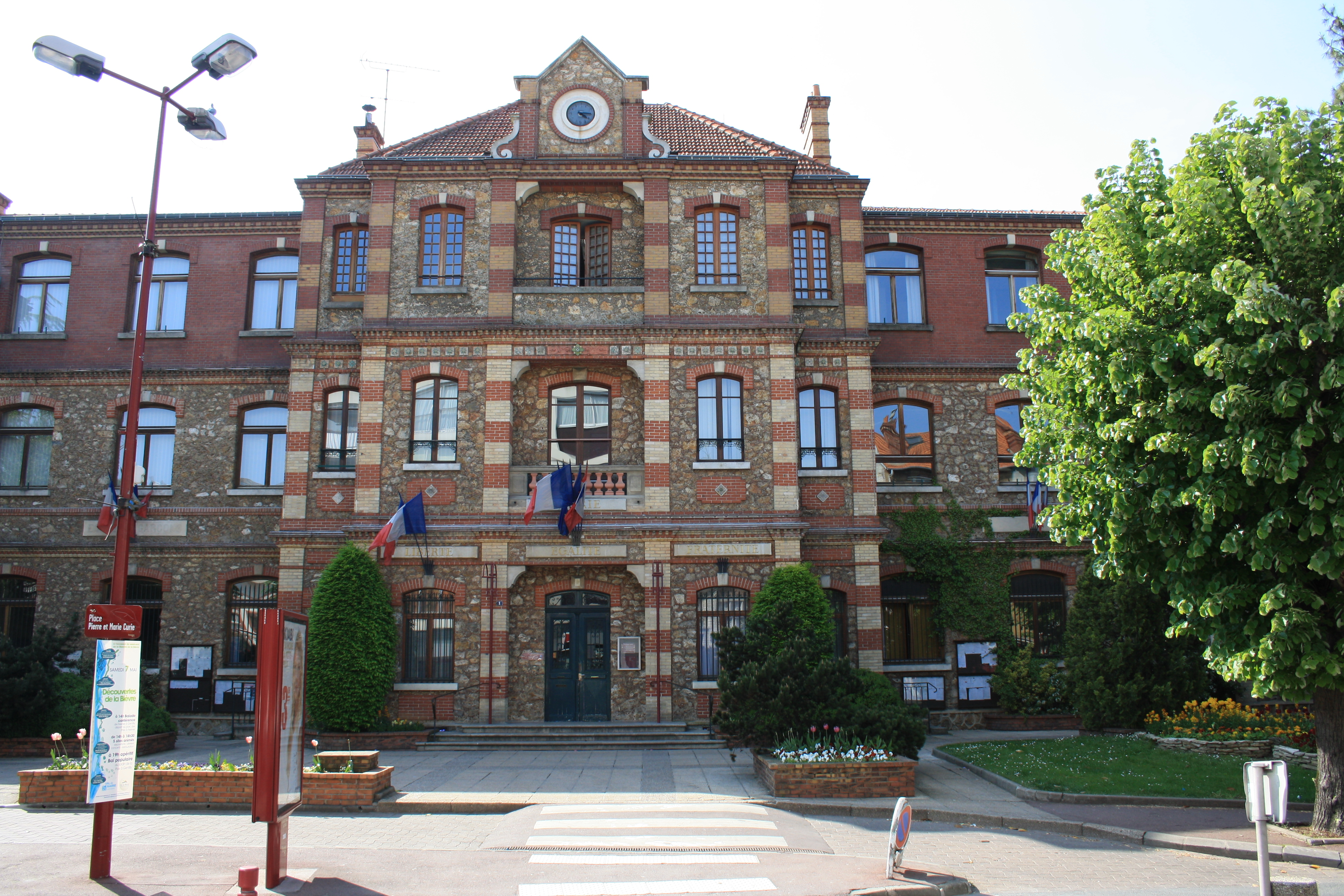
- The main frontage of the Hôtel de Ville in April 2011
- Interactive map of the Hôtel de Ville area

General information
- Type: City hall
- Architectural style: Neoclassical style
- Location: Fresnes, France
- Coordinates: 48.7551°N 2.3221°E
- Completed: 1887

Design and construction
- Architect: Léon Dubreuil

The Hôtel de Ville (French pronunciation: [otɛl də vil], City Hall) is a municipal building in Fresnes, Val-de-Marne, in the southwest suburbs of Paris, standing on Place Pierre et Marie Curie. It has been included on the Inventaire général des monuments by the French Ministry of Culture since 1995.

== History ==
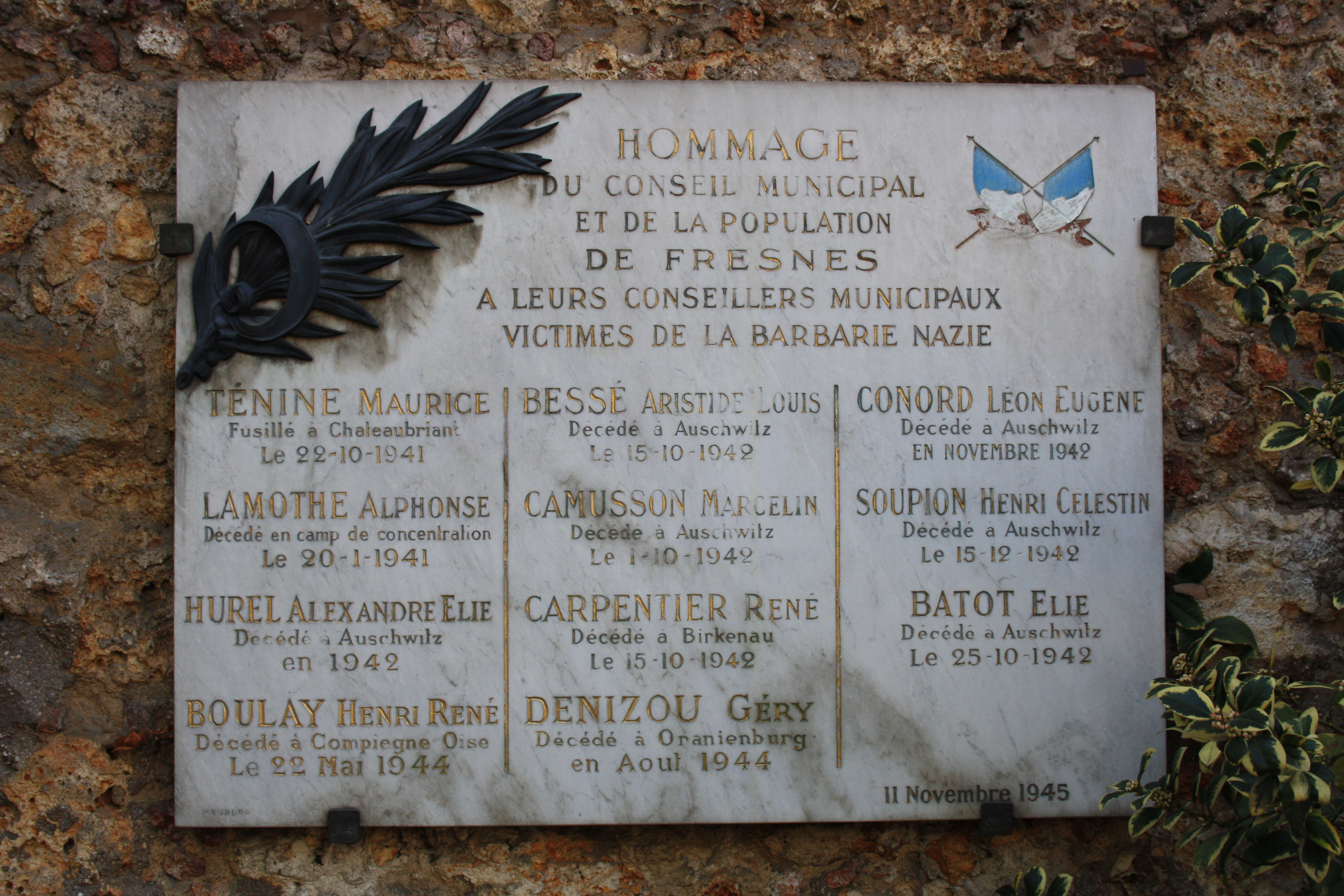
The plaque commemorating the lives of councillors who died during the Second World War

Following the French Revolution, the town council initially met in rented accommodation. This arrangement continued until 1840, when the council started to use a building opposite the Church of Saint-Éloi on Place de l'Église. In September 1884, after finding the previous building too cramped, the council decided to commission a combined town hall and school. The site they selected, on what is now Place Pierre et Marie Curie, was just to the north of the church. The new building was designed by Léon Dubreuil in the neoclassical style, built by Léon Mazet in millstone with terracotta finishings at a cost of FFr 96,765, and was completed in 1887.

The design, as originally built, involved a two-storey symmetrical main frontage of 11 bays facing onto Place Pierre et Marie Curie. The main block of five bays incorporated a central section of three bays which was slightly projected forward. The central bay featured a recessed segmental headed doorway with voussoirs and a keystone on the ground floor, a recessed French door with a balustrade, voussoirs and a keystone on the first floor, and a clock above. The other bays were all fenestrated in a similar style. The main block accommodated the Salle du Conseil (council chamber) and teacher's accommodation, while the left-hand block accommodated the boys' school, and the right-hand block accommodated the girls' school. Additional wings of four bays each were built to a design by Sieur Thoumy in the late 19th century.

A competition to decorate the building was held in the early 20th century: sketches created by Jean-Constant Pape were subsequently acquired by the Petit Palais in Paris.

During the liberation of the town by the French 2nd Armoured Division, commanded by General Philippe Leclerc, on 24 August 1944, during the Second World War, the town hall was converted into a first aid post, while the fierce fighting took place outside. Some of the wounded had been rescued from one of Leclerc's tanks which had been destroyed by German artillery. After the war a plaque was attached to the town hall to commemorate the lives of eight members of the town council and two of their colleagues who were arrested by the German authorities and sent to the deaths at Auschwitz concentration camp in July 1942.

The main block was increased in height by an additional storey, using millstone, in the early 1950s, and the wings were also increased in height, but using red brick, in the mid-1970s. The post office, which had been based in the boys' school block, relocated to a new building on the corner of Rue Auguste Daix and Boulevard Jean Jaurès in 1972. Meanwhile, the library, which had also been based in the complex, relocated to a new building on Rue Maurice Ténine in 1977.
