= Solange Ancona =

French composer (1943–2019)

Solange Ancona (born 14 August 1943 in Paris – November 29, 2019) was a French composer.

== Biography ==
Ancona studied at the Conservatoire national supérieur de Paris under Olivier Messiaen and Giacinto Scelsi. She resided at the Villa Medici between 1973 and 1975.

After completing her studies, Ancona took a position teaching musical analysis and composition at the Conservatoire Régional de Versailles, where she remained for over thirty years. Noted students include French composer François Paris, cellist Florian Lauridon and French composer and pianist Benoît Delbecq.

== Personal life and death ==
Ancona died on November 29, 2019. Following her death, Ancona's neighbors rallied together to preserve her invaluable archives, particularly her musical scores. Their efforts were successful, and in 2021, her archives were relocated to the Hector Berlioz Museum media library, ensuring the preservation and accessibility of her musical works.

== Works ==
Selected works include:

- Slantze III for soprano and orchestra (text by Dante)
- Thama for solo cello (created by Florian Lauridon)
- Resonanz classical guitar 10-string (created by Sebastian Vaumoron)
- Aïvantcha musical theater (text by Dante)
- Fidélité, inspired by a poem by Louis Valensi

=== Discography ===
Releases:

- Snaïa/Proslambanomenos/Anschlag/Sonate Pour Flutes Alto Et Harpes (LP) Point-Radiant 1971
- La Journée De L'Existence (CD, Album)
