= Georges Delvallée =

French organist (born 1937)

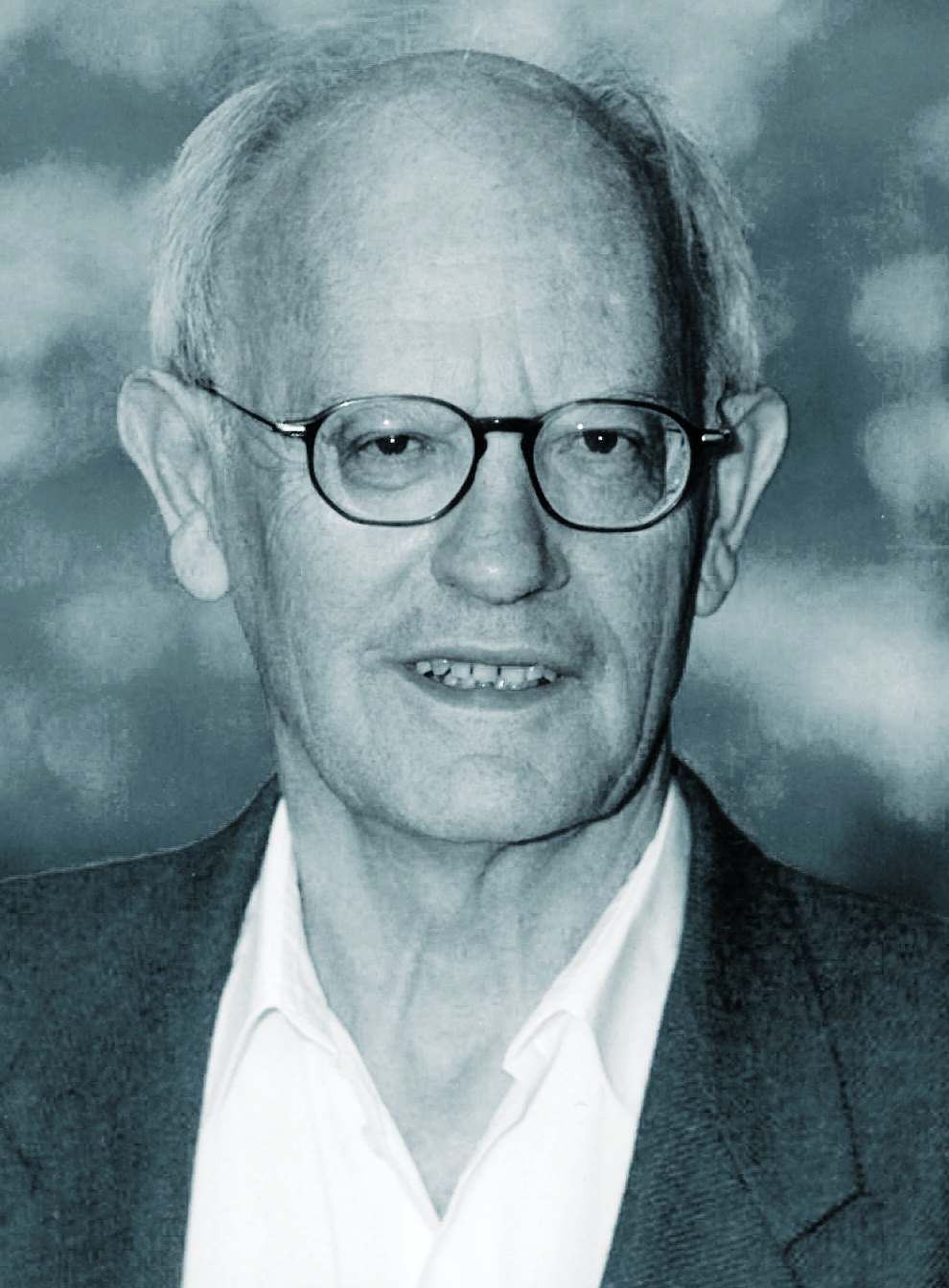
Georges Delvallée

Georges Delvallée (born 15 March 1937 at Fourmies, Nord is a French organist.

A student of Alfred Cortot, Delvallée prepared his licence for concert at the École normale de musique de Paris. In addition to the piano, he studied harmony, composition with Henri Challan. Following the advice of Marcel Dupré, André Marchal and Marie-Louise Girod, he decided to devote himself to pipe organ.

He made a great career dedicated to organ symphonies, specializing in particular in the work of Charles Tournemire. He is an academic at the École normale de musique de Paris and teaches at conservatories in the Paris region.

== Discography ==
- Musique d’orgue contemporaine - Daniel-Lesur, Jean-Jacques Werner, Božidar Kantušer (Sonotec - OC 8609) - 1968
- Charles Tournemire - Sept Chorals-Poèmes pour les sept paroles du Christ, op. 67 (Arion - ARN 68 158 - 1 CD) - 1970
- Grandes toccatas et carillons pour orgue - Bach, Gigout, Dupré, Tournemire, Vierne, Widor, Boëllman, Werner, Duruflé (reissue Arion ARN 68076 - 1 CD) - 1972
- Saqueboute, trombone et orgue aux XVIIe et XVIIIe - Marcello, Vivaldi, Corelli, Frescobaldi - Jean-Pierre Mathieu, Saqueboute et trombone (Arion - ARN 34949) - 1974
- Violon et orgue au XVIIIe siècle - Corelli, Leclair, Haendel, Vitali - Annie Jodry, violin (Arion - ARN 37161) - 1975
- Les orgues de Masevaux - Lucchinetti, Guami, Blanco, Satie, Langlais - Marie-Louise Jaquet, orgue (Arion - ARN 38486) - 1978
- Charles Tournemire - Anthology of the L'Orgue mystique (reissue Arion - ARN 268 105 - 2 CD) - 1981
- L'Orgue mystique: 6 offices / Charles Tournemire - Antoine Reboulot, Bernard Foccroulle, George Delvallée, Pierre Segond, Bernard Heiniger, organ (Erato Records ERA9239 / 40) - 1981
- Louis Couperin Pièces pour clavier (Arion - ARN 38582) - 1981
- Robert Schumann L'intégrale de l’œuvre pour orgue ou piano pédalier (REM - 10969) - 1983
- Violin - Organ - Jean-Jacques Werner, Pierre Ancelin - Annie Jodry, violon (REM - 10966) - 1983
- Noëls anciens français - Daquin, Lebègue, Dornel, Dandrieu, Balbastre, Corrette (REM - 11139) - 1986 - reissue Azulejaria 2016
- Charles Tournemire - Douze Préludes-Poèmes, Poème mystique & autres pièces pour piano (Accord - 204 772 - 2 CD) - 1989 and 1990
- Charles Tournemire - Les quatre symphonies pour orgue (Accord - 243 312 - 1 CD) -1990
- Charles Tournemire - Suite évocatrice Op.74, Sei Fioretti, Fantaisie symphonique op. 64 et Poème III Op.59 (Accord - 243 812 - 1 CD) - 1992
- Louis Vierne - Intégrale de l'œuvre pour piano (Arion - ARN 68 270 & 312 - 2 CD) - 1994 and 1995
- Charles Tournemire - L'Orgue mystique "Cycle de Noël" (Accord - 205 352 - 3 CD) - 1996
- Charles Tournemire - L'Orgue mystique "Cycle de Pâques" (Accord - 206 002 - 3 CD) - 1997
- Charles Tournemire - L'Orgue mystique "Cycle après la Pentecôte" 1st part (Accord - 206 632 - 3 CD) - 1999
- Charles Tournemire - L'Orgue mystique "Cycle après la Pentecôte" 2nd part (Accord - 461 641-2 - 3 CD) - 2000
- Charles Tournemire - Sept Chorals-Poèmes pour les sept paroles du Christ, op. 67 (Accord - 472 982-2 - 1 CD) - 2003
- Jehan Alain - Intégrale de l'œuvre pour piano (Triton - TRI 331175 - 1 CD) - 2011
- Robert Schumann - L'intégrale de l’œuvre pour orgue ou piano pédalier(Azulejaria - 6139 - 2 CD) reissued - 2015
- Jean-Jacques Werner Œuvres pour orgueF / Božidar Kantušer - Intégrale de l’œuvre pour orgue (Azulejaria - 6971 - 2 CD) part reissue / part original recording - 2016
- Rhapsodie bretonne - musique française pour orgue inspirée des chants populaires et des cantiques bretons - Camille Saint-Saëns, Charles Tournemire, Paul Le Flem, Joseph-Guy Ropartz, Gaston Litaize, Jean Langlais (Azulejaria - 8102 - 1 CD) - 2017
