= Lycée Frédéric Mistral (Fresnes) =

High school in Fresnes, Val-de-Marne, France

Lycée Frédéric Mistral is a sixth-form college/senior high school in Fresnes, Val-de-Marne, France, in the Paris metropolitan area.

As of 2016 there are about 1,000 general high school students and 500 vocational high school students with a combined total of fewer than 1,500 students. As of 2011 it had about 1,600 students.

In 2016 Le Parisien described the school as "prestigious". As of 2011 it was ranked as the no. 1 senior high/sixth-form in the Academy of Créteil. Its Baccalaureate pass rate in 2010 was 96.1%.

== History ==
Lycée intercommunal de Fresnes opened in 1973 with about 360 students. It was later renamed after Mistral.

In 2016 teachers went on strike and parents of students blocked the school entrance to protest against issues in the professional education section.
