= Yves Ramette =

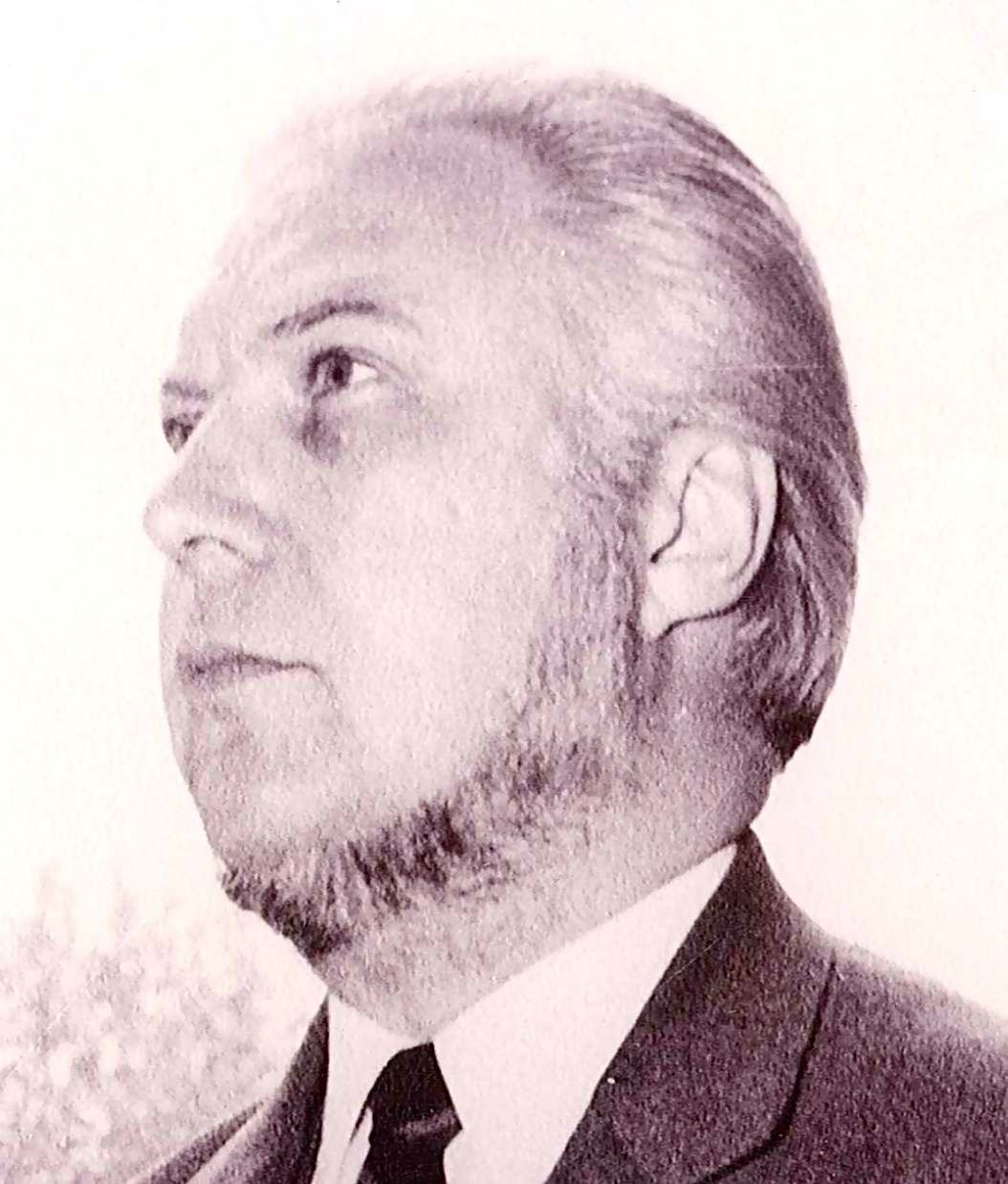
Yves Ramette, composer and organist (1921-2012)

Yves Ramette (6 February 1921 – 2 June 2012) was a French post-romantic composer and organist.

== Biography ==
Yves Ramette was born in 1921 in Bavay, France, where his father was the Director of a Professional Graduate School. From a very young age, Ramette was attracted to music. When he was seven years old, he started learning musical notation as well as playing the violin and the piano. At age fourteen, while pursuing his secondary studies at the Lycée de Beauvais, he also learnt Harmony lessons. In Beauvais, he also studied the violin with Robert Duforestel.

He then joined the Conservatoire national supérieur de musique de Paris to study harmony with Jacques de la Presle, counterpoint and fugue with Simone Plé-Caussade, piano with Lélia Gousseau and Lazare Lévy. He also studied conducting and orchestration with Eugène Bigot.

In parallel, he studied the Organ with Georges Jacob, composition with Arthur Honegger at the École Normale de Musique de Paris where he awarded First Prize in 1945. From 1947 to 1953 he taught the organ and counterpoint at the Schola Cantorum de Paris.

In 1952, he was appointed as the “Maître de chapelle” and organ player at the St-Ferdinand-des-Ternes church in Paris. In 1953, together with Božidar Kantušer, Luc Ferrari and Pierre Migaux he founded Group 84. He created and directed the mixed choir “Voix Ardens” to promote the traditional, classical, romantic and modern choral music. This choir gave many concerts from 1968 to 1987. During his later years, Ramette mainly composed works for the organ and the piano, his favorite instruments. In 1997 he published a memoir “Grandeur et Décadence d’une tribune” (Éditions Odilon Media/Éditions du Sel).

Ramette output includes six symphonies, several chamber musics, choral and vocal works and many organ and piano pieces. Almost all his works have been recorded on CD (Navona Records, USA). The American concert pianist Eric Himy has performed and recorded many of Ramette's piano works.

Yves Ramette died in Prades in June 2012, aged ninety-one.

== Complete works ==
=== Orchestral works ===
- Symphony No. 1 for Strings and percussion, op. 4 (1944)
- Symphony No. 2, op. 10 (1948)
- Symphony No. 3 for Strings, op. 11 (1949)
- Symphony No. 4, op. 13 (1951)
- Prelude, Fugue and Postlude for Strings, piano and timpani, op. 14 (1952)
- Symphony No. 5 "Hymn to Life", In Memory of Arthur Honegger, op. 15 (1956)
- Symphony No. 6 "Manfred", op. 18 (1963)

=== Chamber music ===
- Sonata for violon and piano No. 1 in A minor, without opus number (1941–42)
- String Quartet in C sharp minor, without opus number (1940; rev. 1942)
- Sonata for cello and piano, without opus number (1942)
- Sonata for violon and piano No. 2, without opus number (1943)
- Introduction et Allegro en forme de Scherzo, for flute, oboe, clarinet, bassoon and piano, op. 6 (1945)
- Trio for Three Pianos, op. 8 (1947)

=== Vocal and choral works ===
- Three poems of Francis Carco, for baritone and instrumental ensemble (flute, harp, piano, violin, viola, cello), op. 3 (1944)
- Three poems of Claude Apel, for narrator and piano, op. 9 (1947)
- Love Songs, for mezzo-soprano and piano, op. 16 (1959)
- La Flûte de jade, for mezzo-soprano and piano (on poems by Franz Toussaint), op. 17 (1960)
- Salve Regina, for soprano solo, mixed choir and organ, op. 28 (1982)
- Psaume 116, for soprano solo, mixed choir and organ, op. 29 (1982)
- Ave Maria, for soprano, tenor and organ, op. 30 (1983)
- Christus, cantata for mixed choir and organ, op. 31 (1983)

=== Organ works ===
- Concerto for solo organ, op. 19 (1964)
- Ricercare, op. 20 (1965)
- Organaria, op. 21 (1969)
- Ermia, poem, op. 22 (1971)
- Pastorale, op. 23 (1976)
- Toccata and Fugue, In Memory of Georges Guynemer, op. 26 (1979)
- Pour une nuit de Noël, triptych, op. 27 (1983)

=== Piano works ===
- Introduction and Scherzo, op. 1 (1943)
- Four Sketches, op. 2 (1944)
- Five Variations on a theme of Arthur Honegger, op. 5 (1945)
- Triptych, op. 7 (1946)
- Five Musical Moments, op. 12 (1950)
- Variations on an Original Theme, op. 32 (1985)
- Naiads, op. 33 (1986)
- Four Pastels, op. 34 (1987)
- Three Etudes, op. 35 (1988–89)
- First Sonata, op. 36 (1991)
- Humoresque, op. 37 (1994)
- Fountains and Cascades, op. 38 (1996)
- The Elves, op. 39 (1997)
- Arabesques, op. 40 (1998)
- Pour un bal imaginaire, op. 41 (1999)
- First Barcarolle, op. 42 (2000)
- Second Sonata, op. 43 (2001)
- Second Barcarolle, op. 44 (2003)
- Lullaby, op. 45 (2004)
- Variations on a theme of Mozart, op. 46 (2005)

== Discography ==
- Variations sur un thème d'Honegger; Naïades; Pastels; Fontaines et Cascades; Sonate n°1; Humoresque : Eric Himy (piano) 1 CD "Compositions for Piano" MMC Recordings 2001
- Prélude, Fugue et Postlude; Symphonie n°3 pour cordes & Symphonie n°5 « Hymne à la Vie » : Eric Himy (piano) & Prague Radio Symphony Orchestra, Vladimir Valek (conductor); Netherlands Radio Philharmonic Orchestra, Jan Stulen (conductor) 1 CD "Compositions for Orchestra" MMC Recordings 2002
- Variations sur un thème d'Honegger; Pour un bal imaginaire; Barcarolles n°1 & n°2; Sonate n°2 (+Debussy's La terrasse des audiences du clair de lune & Prélude à l'après-midi d'un faune) : Eric Himy (piano) 1 CD "Le Piano imaginaire" 2005
- Variations sur un thème de Mozart (+Mozart's Piano Sonata No. 13 & various works by Salieri, Fabregas & Mozart) : Eric Himy (piano) 1 CD "Homage to Mozart" CENTAUR RECORDS 2006
- Variations sur un thème d'Honegger; Naïades; Pastels; Fontaines et Cascades; Sonate n°1; Humoresque : Eric Himy (piano); Prélude, Fugue et Postlude; Symphonie n°3 pour cordes & Symphonie n°5 « Hymne à la Vie » : Czech Radio Symphony Orchestra, Vladimir Valek (conductor); Netherlands Radio Philharmonic Orchestra, Jan Stulen (conductor) 2 CDs "Cascading into Reverie" Navona Records 2013 (compilation of the CDs "Compositions for Piano" & "Compositions for Orchestra")
- Quatre Esquisses; Introduction et Scherzo; Trois Etudes; Variations sur un thème original; Berceuse; Les Elfes : Eric Himy (piano) 1 CD "With Passion" Navona Records 2013
- Symphonies n°1, n°2, n°4 & n°6 « Manfred » : St. Petersburg State Symphony Orchestra, Vladimir Lande (conductor) 2 CDs "At the Precipice" Navona Records 2014
- Toccata et Fugue in memoriam Georges Guynemer; Pour une Nuit de Noël; Solum in Modum (Concerto & Ricercare); Pastorale : Yves Ramette (organ) 2 CDs "The Golden Galaxy" Navona Records 2014
- Introduction et Allegro pour piano et vents (+Fire Tiger de Steven Block; Night Stream & Rhythm Modes de Rain Worthington; Gambit de Paula Diehl; Duo for Violin and Cello de Allen Brings) : Jessica Lizak (flute), Vladimir Lande (oboe), Rane Moore (clarinet), Bryan Young (bassoon), Karolina Rojahn (piano) 1 CD "Elements Rising" Navona Records 2015
- Quatuor à cordes; 3 Poèmes de Francis Carco; Sonates pour violon et piano n°1 & n°2; Sonate pour violoncelle et piano : Vit Muzik (violin), Carmine Miranda (cello), Karolina Rojahn (piano), Erik van Heyningen (baritone) 1 CD "In Times of Torment" Navona Records 2016
