= Pierre Ancelin =

French composer

Pierre Ancelin (October 25, 1934 – December 19, 2001) was a French composer.

== Life ==
Born in Cannes, Ancelin studied pedagogy and music history at the conservatories of Aix-en-Provence and Marseille, then followed the course of aesthetics of Olivier Messiaen in Paris.

He was mostly self-taught in composition and orchestration, although he followed the advice of Ernest Ansermet and Frank Martin. From 1963, he worked regularly in French literature and various music magazines abroad.

In 1975, he founded the UNCM (National Union of Composers of Music) with Andre Jolivet, Daniel Lesur and Henri Sauguet. He presided over the union until 2000.

== Musical organisations ==
Ancelin was appointed inspector general of music at the city of Paris in 1978 by Marcel Landowski. He was also behind other groups in favor of music, such as the European Union of Composers (1992), the French Society of Contemporary Music, and Music Action Philip Morris. At the latter, he presided a commission comprising, among others, Sauguet, Landowski, Rolf Liebermann, and Gabriel Bacquier, charged with discovering and promoting young French interpreters, as well as the creation and dissemination of French works, both in France and abroad.
