= Juan Vasle =

Slovenian opera singer

Juan Vasle (born 31 August 1954) is a Slovenian operatic and concert bass baritone and a journalist.

== Biography ==
=== Singing career ===
Vasle was born in Buenos Aires, Argentina, where he received his diploma as a singer at the Superior Institute of Arte (Instituto Superior de Arte) of the Teatro Colón. He was a finalist at the Luciano Pavarotti International Voice Competition in Philadelphia. Since 1990, he is a member of the solo ensemble of the SNG Opera and Ballet Ljubljana, where he has done a long line of important bass roles: Zahari, Lindorf, Coppelius, Dappertuto, Miracle, don Alfonso, Ferrando, Escamillo, Martin Krpan, St. Bris, Ramfis...

He also took part in guest appearances in Australia, Brazil, the Czech Republic, Italy, Canada, Kosovo, Peru, Uruguay, and elsewhere. He has also performed in a lot of oratorios of Bach, Mozart, Mendelssohn, Rossini, Verdi and lieder recitals.

=== Journalism ===
He received his journalist degree at the Journalism Academy in Buenos Aires. In the 1970s, he was employed at the Mercado weekly magazine, which was at the time considered the most influential in the world of business and economy in the country. He also wrote columns about football for the Crónica. Later, he co-founded and became the chief editor of a musical magazine ProMúsica. As a professional commentator of classical music, he took part of the show Matutino 103, which was at the time anchored by the well-known Luis Garibotti and received the Ondas award for the highest level of excellency for Spanish language broadcasts.

In his native Slovenia, he published articles about association football in South America in the local Delo newspaper. He had a column in the Dnevnik called Volej z odra (A volley from backstage), and is still an occasional participant in its Saturday supplement, Objektiv. Since 2008, he comments on the broadcasts of South American football matches at the local television station Šport TV.

== Discography ==
- Slovenske pesmi (Slovenski samospevi in narodne pesmi) (Slovenian songs (Slovene lieder and national songs)), 1993
- Slovenski samospevi XX. Stoletja (Slovenian lieder of the 20th century), 1996
- Sudamérica (Pesmi iz Južne Amerike), (Sudamérica (Songs from South America)) 1998
- Raduj, človek moj (Božične pesmi), (Be happy, dear fellow (Christmas carols))2002
- Ljuba si, pomlad zelena (Slovenske narodne pesmi), (Ljuba si, pomlad zelena (Slovenian national songs)) 2009

== Books ==
- Pevci so tudi ljudje (24 intervjujev z znamenitimi opernimi pevci) (Singers are also people (24 interviews with famous opera singers)), 1993
- Fuzbal, tango in polka (Nogometne zgodbe iz Slovenije in Južne Amerike) (Football, tango and polka (Stories about association football in Slovenia and South America)), 2002
- Ustavite svet! Mundial je tu (Zgodovina nogometnih svetovnih prvenstev 1930-2006) (Stop the world!The World Cup is here (The history of the Association football World Cup 1930-2006)), 2006
