= Zagreb Quartet =

- Also known as: Zagreb String Quartet
- Origin: Zagreb, Croatia
- Genres: Classical
- Occupation: String quartet
- Instrument(s): 2 violins, 1 viola, 1 cello
- Years active: 1919–present
- Members: Martin Krpan, violin Davor Philips, violin Hrvoje Philips, viola Martin Jordan, vcello
- Website: www.zagrebquartet.com

The Zagreb Quartet (Zagrebački Kvartet), also known as the Zagreb String Quartet (Zagrebački Gudački Kvartet) is a Zagreb–based string quartet formed in 1919. The oldest Croatian chamber ensemble, they have played at more than 3,000 concerts on all continents, recorded more than 60 albums and won numerous domestic and foreign awards, including the Vladimir Nazor Award for lifetime achievement in 2009.

From the beginning, the quartet's repertoire has included traditional and modern compositions by both international and Croatian composers. The Zagreb Quartet has appeared in many of the world's major concert halls including those of Berlin, Bonn, London, Milan, Amsterdam, Budapest, Warsaw, Ankara, Istanbul, New York and Sydney.

== Current members ==
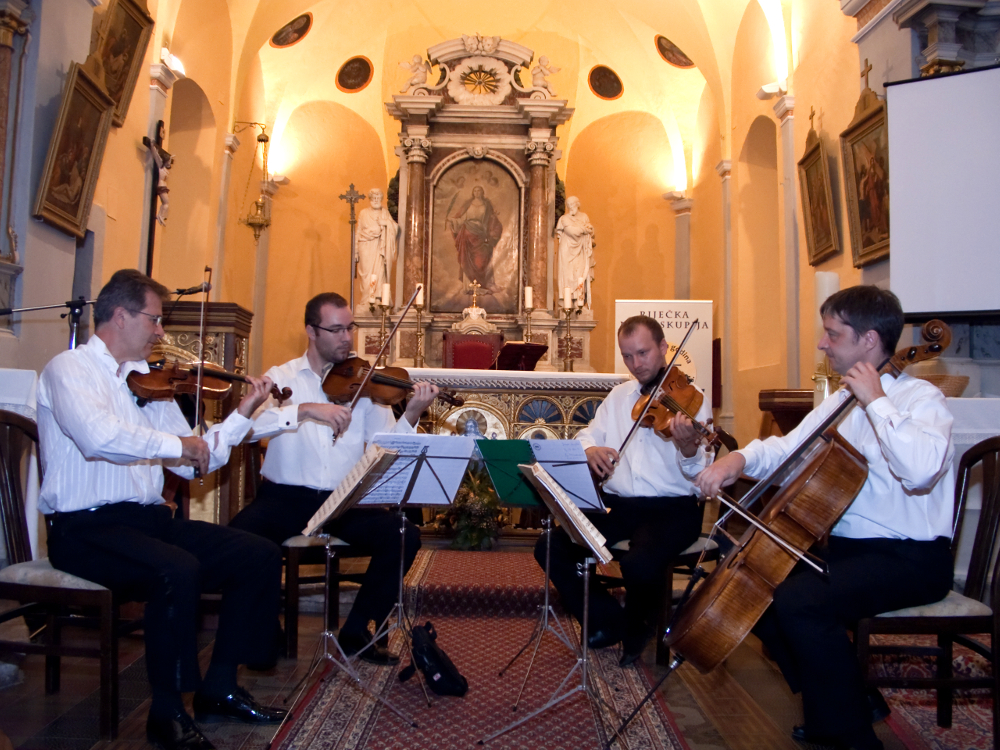
Members of the Zagreb String Quartet during a performance in 2009

- Martin Krpan, violin (member since 2017)
- Davor Philips, violin (member since 2001)
- Hrvoje Philips, viola (member since 2005)
- Martin Jordan, cello (member since 1992)

== Previous Members ==
In more than 95 years of performing, over 30 musicians have made a contribution as part of the quartet. These include:

=== Original Members ===
- Vaclav Huml, violin
- Milan Graf, violin
- Ladislav Miranov, viola
- Umberto Fabri, violoncello

=== Other Members ===
- Dragutin Arany
- Goran Bakrač
- Zlatko Balija
- Marija Cobenzl
- Fred Kiefer
- Josip Klima
- Zvonimir Pomykalo
- Tomislav Šestak
- Josip Stojanović
- Dušan Stranić
- Stjepan Šulek
- Zlatko Topolski
- Đorđe Trkulja
- Ante Živković
- Goran Končar
- Marin Maras

== Awards and recognition ==
- 2009 Vladimir Nazor Award for lifetime achievement
