= Fresnes, Val-de-Marne =

Fresnes
- Commune
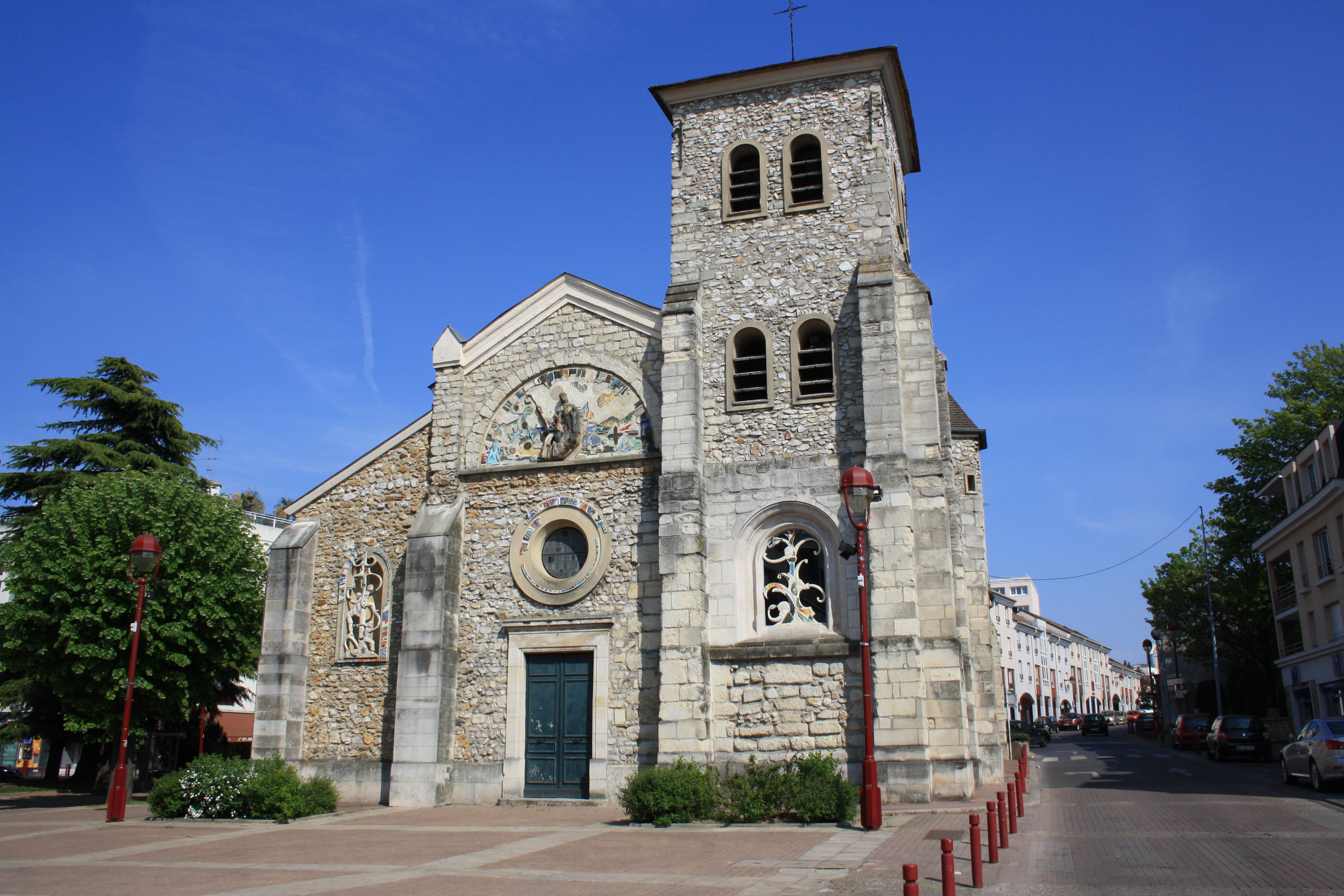
- The church of Saint-Éloi, in Fresnes

- Coat of arms

- Location (in red) within Paris inner suburbs
- Location of Fresnes
- Location within France Location within Île-de-France (region)
- Coordinates: 48°45′18″N 2°19′20″E
- Country: France
- Region: Île-de-France
- Department: Val-de-Marne
- Arrondissement: L'Haÿ-les-Roses
- Canton: L'Haÿ-les-Roses
- Intercommunality: Grand Paris

Government
  - Mayor (2026–32): Christophe Carlier
- Area^{1}: 3.58 km^{2} (1.38 sq mi)
- Highest elevation: 89 m (292 ft)
- Lowest elevation: 45 m (148 ft)
- Population (2023): 29,528
  - Density: 8,250/km^{2} (21,400/sq mi)
- Time zone: UTC+01:00 (CET)
  - Summer (DST): UTC+02:00 (CEST)
- INSEE/Postal code: 94034 /94260
- ^{1} French Land Register data, which excludes lakes, ponds, glaciers > 1 km^{2} (0.386 sq mi or 247 acres) and river estuaries.

Fresnes (French pronunciation: [fʁɛn]) is a commune in the Val-de-Marne department in the southern suburbs of Paris, France. It is located 11.2 km (7.0 mi) from the center of Paris, next to Antony, Sceaux and Rungis. It is drained by the River Bièvre.

The Fresnes Prison, where Jean Genet was held for a time, is located there. It was, between 1978 and 1981, the only place for executions in France, although no sentence of death was executed in that period. The guillotine maintained for the purpose remains in storage at the prison.

== Name ==
The name Fresnes was recorded for the first time in a papal bull of 1152 as Fraxinum. This name comes from Medieval Latin fraxinus (modern French: frêne), meaning "ash tree", after the ash trees covering the territory of Fresnes in ancient times.

== Population ==
Historical population

Year	Pop.	±% p.a.
1793	361	—
1821	336	−0.26%
1846	453	+1.20%
1872	471	+0.15%
1886	594	+1.67%
1891	611	+0.57%
1896	853	+6.90%
1901	2,400	+22.99%
1906	2,814	+3.23%
1911	3,037	+1.54%
1921	3,869	+2.45%
1926	3,722	−0.77%
1931	5,239	+7.08%

Year	Pop.	±% p.a.
1936	6,023	+2.83%
1946	8,734	+3.79%
1954	7,750	−1.48%
1962	21,527	+13.62%
1968	26,847	+3.75%
1975	28,539	+0.88%
1982	25,902	−1.38%
1990	26,959	+0.50%
1999	25,213	−0.74%
2007	25,115	−0.05%
2012	26,419	+1.02%
2017	27,802	+1.03%
2023	29,528	+1.01%

Source: EHESS and INSEE (1968-2023)

== Transport ==
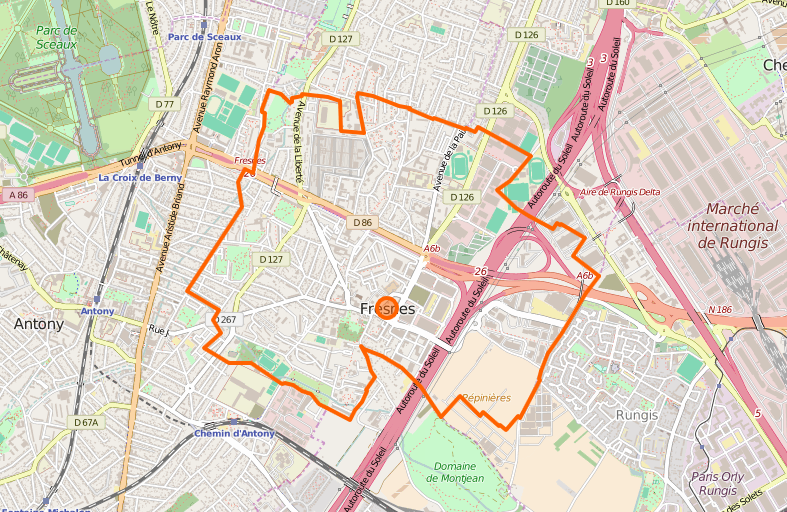

Fresnes is served by no station of the Paris Métro, RER, or suburban rail network. The closest station to Fresnes are Antony or La Croix de Berny station on Paris RER line B and Chemin d'Antony station on RER line C. These stations are located in the neighboring commune of Antony, 1.6 km (0.99 mi) from the town center of Fresnes.

== History ==
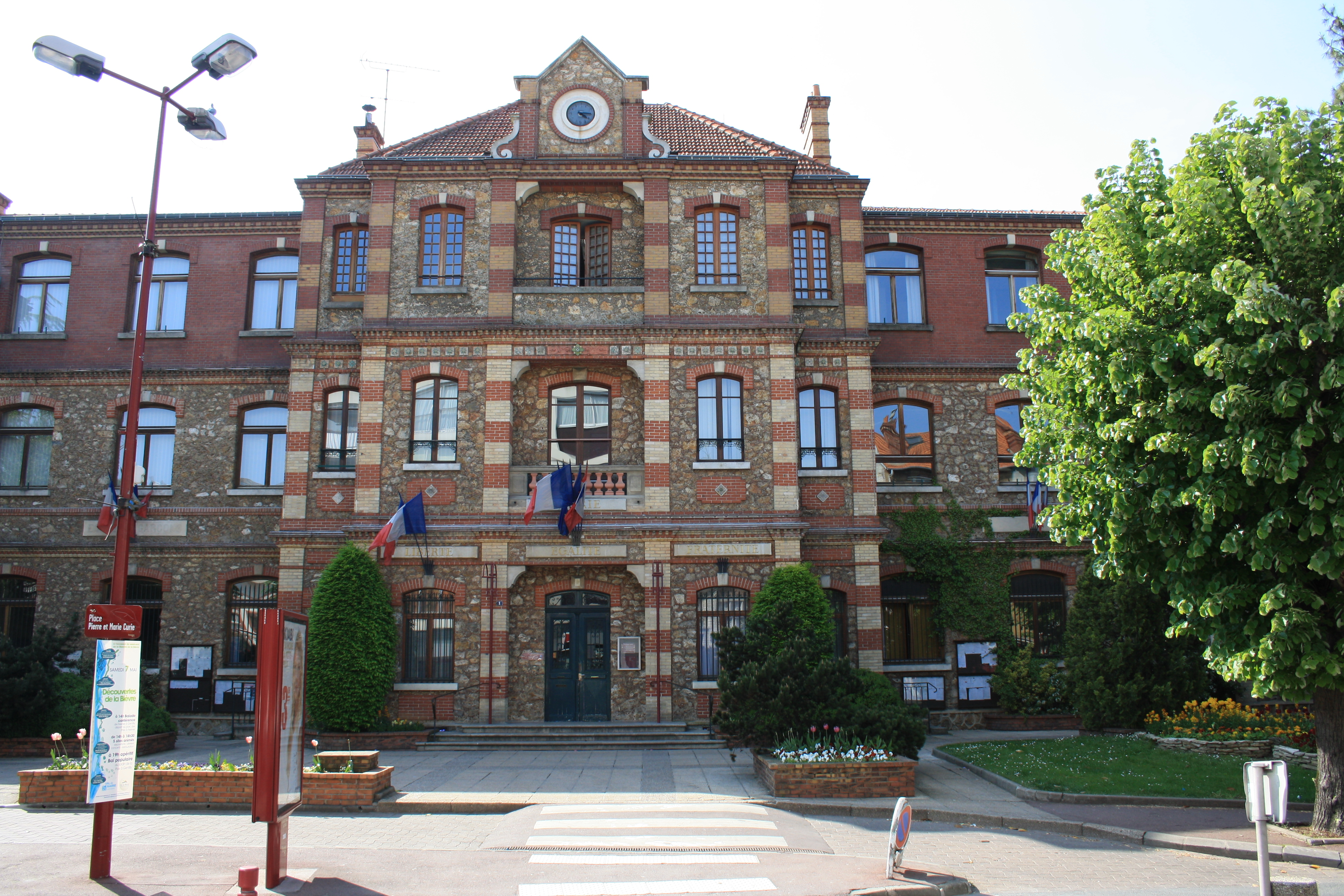
The Hôtel de Ville

The Hôtel de Ville was completed in 1887.

== Culture ==
In the MJC Louise Michel you can find a cinema, a theatre and a concert hall.

== Education ==
In Fresnes there are four kindergartens, five elementary schools, three junior high schools, and one senior high school/sixth-form college.

- Preschools: Barbara, Les Blancs Bouleaux, Les Capucines, Les Coquelicots, Les Marguerites, Les Tulipes
- Elementary schools: École Barbara, École des Frères Lumière, École Robert Doisneau, École Théodore Monod, École Jean Monnet, École Louis Pasteur, École Emilie Roux
- Junior high schools: Collège Jean Charcot, Collège Francine Fromond, Collège Antoine de Saint-Exupéry
- Senior high/sixth-form: Lycée intercommunal Frédéric Mistral

The commune is also home to a municipal library, Bibliothèque municipale de Fresnes.

== Sports ==
The AAS Fresnes is the football club of the city, they play at Parc des Sports.

== Shopping Centre ==
In Fresnes there is a mall called la Cerisaie.

== See also ==
- Communes of the Val-de-Marne department
