= Jean-Jacques Werner =

French conductor and composer

Jean-Jacques Werner (20 January 1935 – 22 October 2017) was a French conductor and composer of modern music.

Parallel to his life as a composer, his career as a conductor began in 1960, with the firm desire to make the works of his time known. He conducts the orchestras of the Radiodiffusion-Télévision Française, the chamber orchestra, the lyrical orchestra, the Orchestre philharmonique de Radio France and the Orchestre national de France, among others.

== Biography ==
Born in Strasbourg, Werner was the eldest of five children. Neither his mother Lucie Lamszus, nor his father Marcel Werner were particularly musicians. He studied music for the first time at the conservatoire in his hometown where he successively won first prizes for harp, horn and orchestral conducting. He then continued his studies at the Schola Cantorum de Paris in Pierre Wissmer's, Daniel Lesur's and Léon Barzin's classes.

Werner died in Barr (Bas-Rhin) at age 82.

== Selected discography ==
- Works by Jean-Jacques Werner published by Ctésibios (www.ctesibios.fr) Disques Ctesibios
- Triptyque for organ, Canticum for flute and organ, Spiritual for violin and organ, Le cantique de Siméon for organ, Psaume VIII for choir and organ. Frédéric Werner (flute), Elsa Grether (violin), Maîtrise Notre-Dame de Paris: Lionel Sow, Béatrice Piertot and Yannick Merlin (organ): Notre-Dame des Champs and Église Saint-Antoine-des-Quinze-Vingts in Paris

== Publications ==
- Jean-Jacques Werner: Diriger, composer, former

== Bibliography ==
- Geneviève Honegger, "Jean-Jacques Auguste Werner", in Nouveau Dictionnaire de biographie alsacienne, vol. 40, p. 4190
- Michaël Andrieu, Jean-Jacques Werner, mille ponts entre un homme et sa musique, éditions Delatour, 2009
