= Mimi Pinson =

Mimi Pinson may refer to:

- "Mimi Pinson", a short story by Alfred de Musset
- Mimi Pinson, Ruggero Leoncavallo's 1913 rewrite of his opera La bohème
- Mimi Pinson, a 1915 operetta with music by Henri Goublier and a libretto by Maurice Ordonneau and Francis Gally
- Mimi Pinson (1924 film), a French silent film
- Mimi Pinson (1958 film), a French film
