= Louis-Jacques Rondeleux =

French lyrical artist (1923–2000)

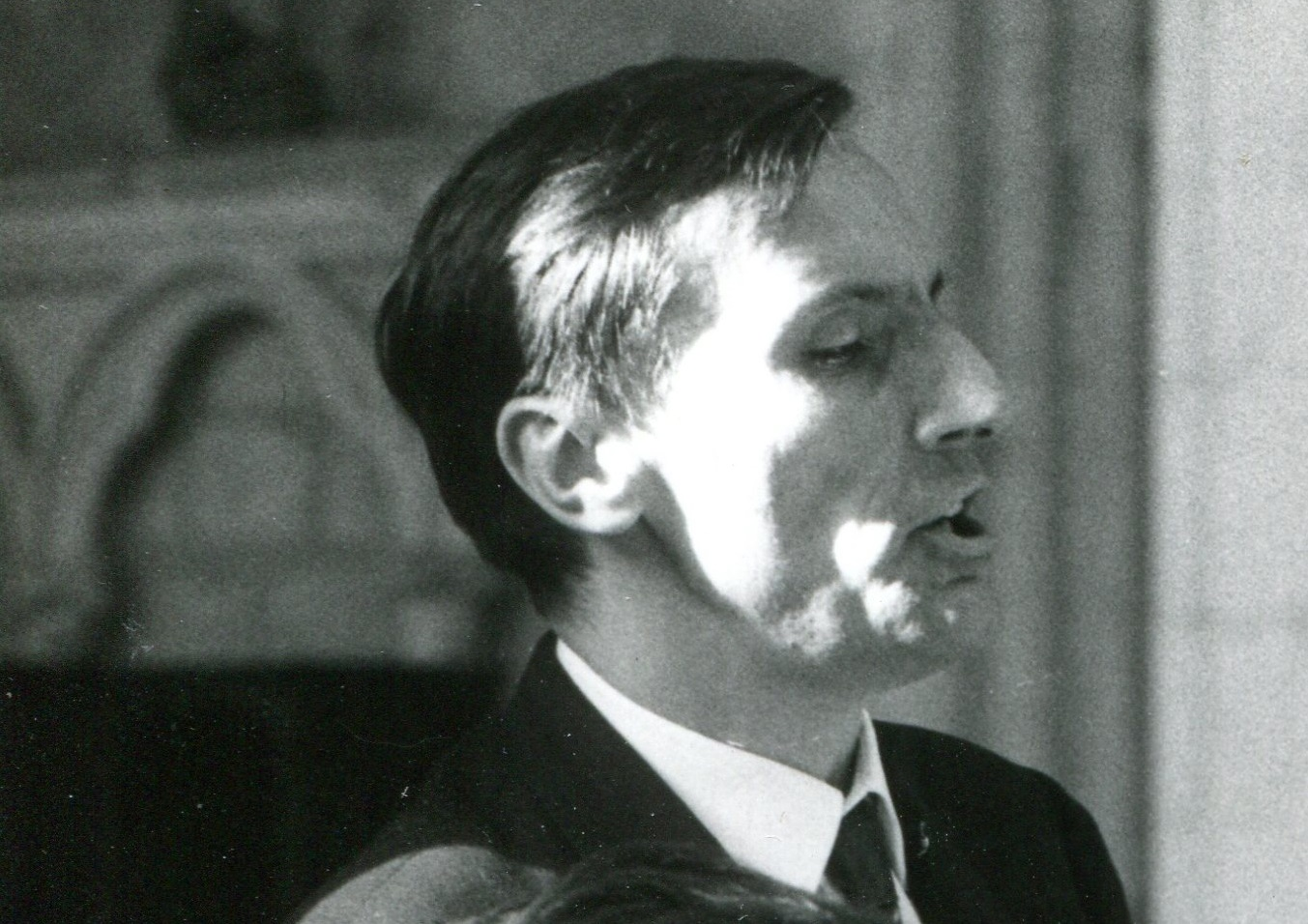
Louis Jacques Rondeleux en 1969

Louis-Jacques Rondeleux (24 October 1923 – 2 November 2000) was a 20th-century French lyrical artist (baritone).

== Biography ==
After studying eclectic topics (mathematics, history, philosophy and theology), Rondeleux began his career in the Catholic clergy. He entered the Major Seminary of Paris (1941–1944) and after a short period of service in the army (December 1944–August 1945) he began a novitiate with the Dominican friars. After 9 months with the Dominicans he gave up his ecclesiastical career (1946).

It was only in the early 1950s that he decided to become a professional singer. He made a career in the 1950s and 1960s during which he explored all repertoires, from medieval musics and troubador and trouvères songs to contemporary creation, through Baroque music and mélodies.

From 1970 to 1989 he was a singing teacher.

=== The lyrical artist (1951–1970) ===
In the late forties Louis-Jacques Rondeleux was a pupil of Jane Bathori, mezzo-soprano, creator of most of Maurice Ravel's melodies. She will pass on to him her art in the interpretation of melodies.

His career as a professional singer began in 1951, as member in the choirs of Élisabeth Brasseur or as a church singer (cantor) (particularly at the Église de la Trinité. In October 1951, he sang for the first time as a soloist under the direction of André Cluytens during a concert in Paris at the Théâtre des Champs-Élysées (Duruflé's Requiem Op.9, Florent Schmitt's Psaume XLVII). He soon became acquainted with many composers and conductors with whom he helped to promote contemporary music (Henri Sauguet, Darius Milhaud, Marcel Landowski, Míkis Theodorákis, Henri Cliquet-Pleyel, Manuel Rosenthal, Frank Martin, Henri Tomasi, Pierre Boulez…).

In 1954 he took part - still as a chorister - in two musical-theatrical creations of the compagnie Renaud-Barrault:

- in Paris, at the Théâtre Marigny, in an adaptation of Le Livre de Christophe Colomb (Libretto by Paul Claudel) on a new music by Darius Milhaud.
- as part of the Festival de Bordeaux, in May 1954, in L'Orestie (after Aeschylus) on a music by Pierre Boulez, of whom it will be the only stage music.

On 30 July 1954 at Aix-en-Provence, he was soloist at the time of the premiere of Sauguet's Les Caprices de Marianne opera.

In 1957, he recorded his first disc with works by Darius Milhaud and Henri Sauguet (Visions infernales).

In 1960, he performed two premieres:

- On 20 May at the Bordeaux festival an opera by Pierre Capdevielle: Les amants captifs.
- On 3 September at the Besançon festival, Henri Sauguet's cantata "L'oiseau a vu tout cela" .

In the same year, he toured Morocco with the Jeunesses musicales de France (JMF).

He also made his first televised recording in La Traviata (broadcast on 9 December 1960).

In 1963 he collaborated, under the direction of Pierre Boulez, on the homage album to Igor Stravinsky (concerning the whole of the discography see the notice on the BNF website).

On 15 June 1963 at the festival de Strasbourg, he performed with the orchestre radio-lyrique de l'ORTF, under the direction of Charles Bruck, Henri Tomasi's le Silence de la mer, after Vercors (cf. Site de l’association Henri Tomasi.) This "lyrical drama" will give rise to several performances in the theatre as well as a recording for television (broadcast on 7 February 1965).

In 1964 he also recorded a disc for the Harmonia Mundi label: Cantigas et Chansons de Troubadours (cf illustration below). In this disc, he inaugurated a revival of interest in medieval music that had not been sung for centuries.

In January 1965, Henry Barraud entrusted him with the creation of his motet Pange Lingua (a tribute to Rameau), a cantata for soprano, baritone, choir and orchestra.

Henri Sauguet wrote about Louis-Jacques Rondeleux:

A voice, a soul: it is precisely in this that Louis-Jacques Rondeleux's art appears so particularly engaging and dissuasive. As is the case with all those for whom music is not only music, it is not only a goal, but also a means of expressing feelings, a human communication.

This powerful and warm voice, with brilliant coppery reflections, he knows how to lead the vast expanse of his voice with flexibility and intelligence, giving him access to the vast and varied repertoires of chamber music, opera, lyrical comedy, profane or sacred oratorio. It seems that the noble virtues which make of a singer, during his life, the predestined performer, necessary for the permanence of music, not only of a time, or an era, are incarnated in him, of a style or genre, but from everyone and from all times to his or her own, giving him or her meaning and opportunity in the choice and use of the means that give his or her interpreters their evidence and authenticity.

A voice, a soul? Yes: it is the voice and soul of music that are reflected in Louis-Jacques Rondeleux.

Henri Sauguet Paris December 1963.

=== The pedagogue (1966–1989) ===
From 1966 Louis-Jacques Rondeleux began a second career, dedicated to teaching. He first worked part-time as a singing teacher at the Montreuil Conservatory (1966–1969).

In 1970, he joined Maurice Béjart in Brussels for the premiere of the École Mudra, a new multidisciplinary training centre for dancers, where he will be responsible for vocal technique.

In Belgium, he subsequently worked (in 1973) with Henri Pousseur at the Centre de recherches musicales de Wallonie (now Centre Henri Pousseur, in Liège. There, he set up vocal workshops specifically oriented towards singing.

In 1974, Jacques Rosner - who has just been appointed to the management of the Conservatoire national supérieur d’art dramatique de Paris - asked him to teach singing to future actors. Louis-Jacques Rondeleux taught there from 1975 to 1989, when he retired.

In 1977, in an effort to pass on the fruits of his experience to as many people as possible, he published a book entitled Trouver sa voix at éditions du Seuil. Trouver sa voix is a practical book, in which Louis-Jacques Rondeleux updates a voice work technique essentially oriented towards raising awareness of the body schema and an awareness of the mechanics of breath. But throughout the proposed exercises, even more so than the voice, we construct ourselves because "it is through the voice that the conscious opens up to the unconscious, and man to himself and to the Other" (Denis Vasse, L'Ombilic et la Voix).

Several times reissued, this book was a great success. Between phoniatric and theatrical experience, it is recognized by amateurs and professionals alike.

== Writing and Parkinson's disease ==
In the early 1950s, Louis-Jacques Rondeleux collaborated with the editorial secretariat of the Esprit magazine (1951 to 1953). Very involved in ideological debates within the Catholic Church, he participates in some of these debates through writing. This commitment will lead him to publish two books, Isaïe et le Prophétisme (1961) at Éditions du Seuil and Jean Steinmann (1969) at éditions Fleurus.

Alongside his friend Georges Suffert he helped create a magazine, les Mal Pensants which wanted to be a place of expression for "left-wing" Catholics; he wrote - in the first issue - the editorial under the title "Who are we?".

He will also collaborate in the establishment of a repertoire of songs dedicated to worship. With Marcel Frémiot he published certain liturgical songs on texts taken from the Bible and translated by him. (St Jacques du Haut-Pas); 1965. Excerpts published in Chanter pour Dieu, ed. du Seuil, Paris 1966). With Jean Bonfils and Michel Fustier he contributed to the same series Chanter pour Dieu (éd. du Seuil, 1967).

His Parkinson's disease, diagnosed at the beginning of the 1980s will profoundly change his last 15 years of existence. In an article published in a specialized journal, he explains how certain symptoms of this disease (quakes, muscular rigidity, hyper-emotionality, stuttering...) can be combated by a targeted work on voice and breath, body and mind work.

The writing of a third book (Éditions du Seuil) - which remained unpublished - will give him the opportunity to give a personal testimony on the different phases of the evolution of his fight against the Parkinson's disease between 1981 and 2000

== Bibliography ==
- Moscou des rêves, Revue Esprit, n°10, October 1957 (archive)
- Isaïe et le Prophétisme, Seuil, Collection Maîtres spirituels n°24, 1961 (notice BNF).
- Jean Steinmann, ed. Fleurus, 1969 (notice BNF).
- La mécanique vocale, la Recherche, 1974, Vol 5, No 48, (p. 734-743).
- La voix, les registres et la sexualité, July–August 1980, Revue Esprit, (p. 46-54) (archive)
- Préface introductive to L'Art du chant, by Manuel Garcia (1847), rééd. Minkoff, 1985.
- Trouver sa voix: contrôler sa respiration, enrichir son timbre, élargir son registre vocal, Seuil, 1st ed 1977, last ed 2004 - ISBN 978-2-020639811

== Discography ==
Some of these recordings have been re-released with the BNF Collection CDs, and most of them are available on the online music site qobuz.com cf: http://www.qobuz.com/fr-fr/search?q=rondeleux&i=boutique

- La Marseillaise, in Histoire de France par les chansons, vol. 9 La Révolution en marche (mono), BNF Collection, Chanson française et francophone
- André Campra: Les femmes & Nicolas Bernier's Bacchus, two French cantatas, Orchestre de chambre Pierre Menet, Denise Gouarne, 1962
- Michel Richard Delalande, Te Deum, orch. de chambre de Versailles, dir. Gaston Roussel.
- Claude Debussy, Mélodies: Trois chansons de France - Trois Ballade de François Villon - Le promenoir des deux amants - Fêtes galantes. Piano Jean-Claude Ambrosini. on Discogs
- Cantigas et chansons de troubadours, Jose Luis Ochoa, tenor / Louis Jacques Rondeleux, baritone, Roger Lepauw, vielle, Serge Depannemaker, tambourine, Harmonia Mundi (HMO 30.566),
- Les Trouveurs du Moyen-Âge, Bernard de Ventadour, Adam de La Halle, Tanhauser. Louis Jacques Rondeleux (baritone), Roger Lepauw (viola/vielle), Raoul W Coquillat (tambourine). Series Musique de Tous les Temps n°36, notice BNF FRBNF380719334
