= Charles Renoux =

French Benedictine monk and orientalist (1925–2026)

- Born: 30 April 1925; Bouin, France
- Died: 2 February 2026 (aged 100); En-Calcat Abbey, France
- Education: Catholic University of Toulouse; Catholic University of Paris
- Occupations: Monk, orientalist

Athanase Charles Renoux (French: [ʃaʁl ʁənu]; 30 April 1925 – 2 February 2026) was a French Benedictine monk and orientalist.

Renoux dedicated his life to laity at En-Calcat Abbey in Dourgne and attended the Catholic University of Toulouse, where he studied Syriac, Georgian, and Armenian. He then studied Eastern Christianity at the Catholic University of Paris. Throughout his career, he wrote dozens of articles on Syriac, Georgian, and Armenian liturgical texts.

Renoux died at En-Calcat Abbey on 2 February 2026, at the age of 100.

== Books ==
- Un rite pénitentiel le jour de la Pentecôte. L’office de la génuflexion dans la tradition arménienne (1973)
- Initiation chrétienne. 1. Rituels arméniens traduits, introduits et annotés (1997)
- Les Hymnes de la Résurrection. I. Hymnographie liturgique géorgienne, introduction, traduction et annotation des textes du Sinaï 18 (2000)
- Una nuova tappa del djachots (Lezionario armeno) e del suo ciclo eortologico (2018)
