= Alfred de Musset =

French writer (1810–1857)

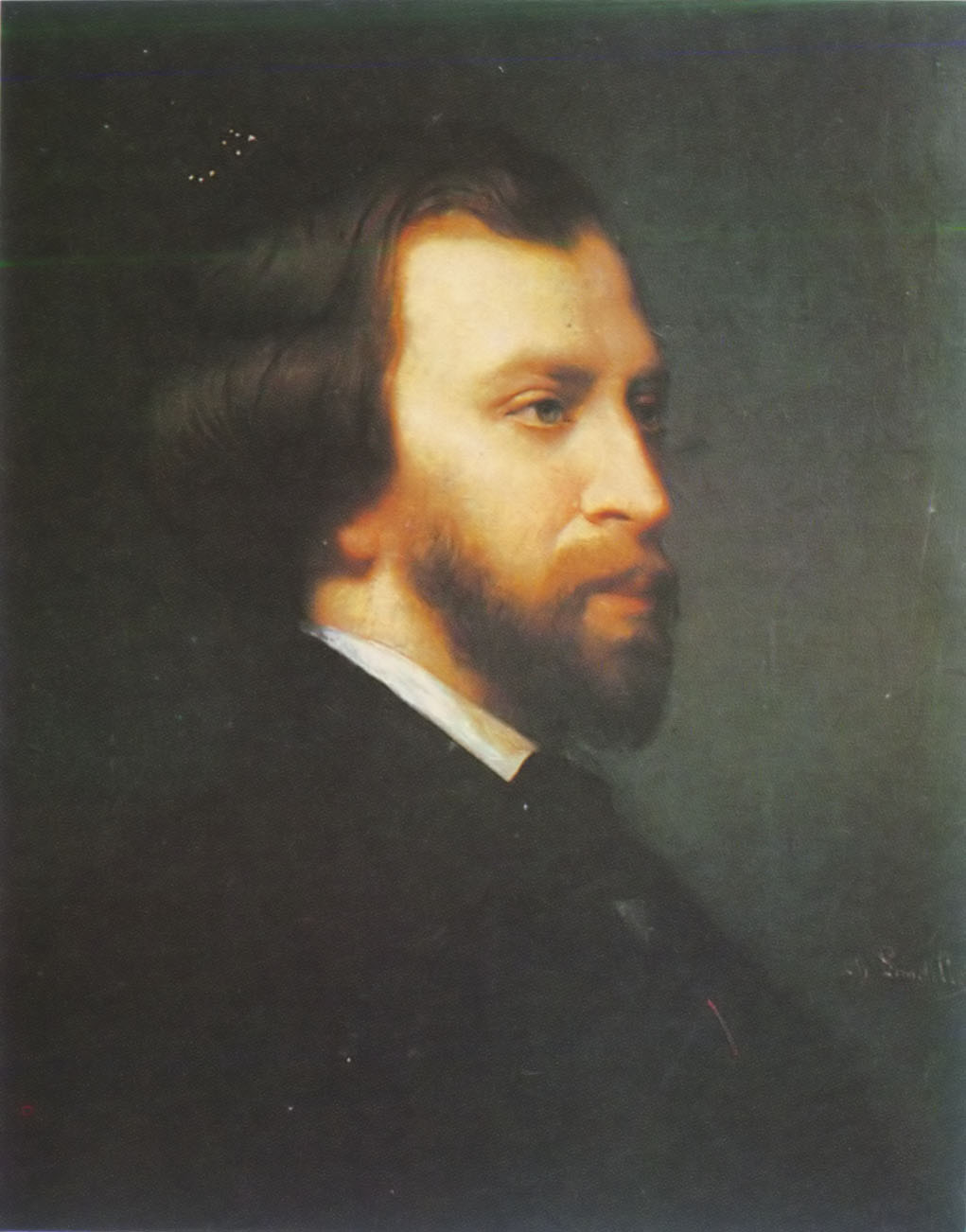
- Musset painted by Charles Landelle
- Born: Alfred Louis Charles de Musset-Pathay; 11 December 1810; Paris, France
- Died: 2 May 1857 (aged 46); Paris, France
- Occupations: Poet, dramatist
- Writing career
- Movement: Romanticism

Signature
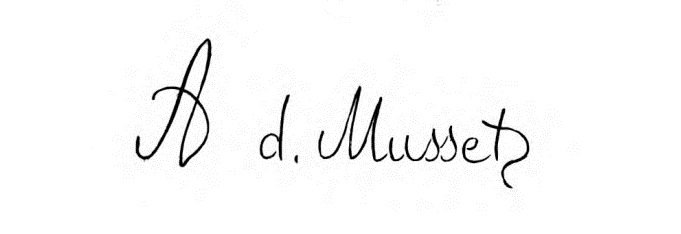

Alfred Louis Charles de Musset-Pathay (French: [alfʁɛd də mysɛ]; 11 December 1810 – 2 May 1857) was a French dramatist, poet, and novelist. Along with his poetry, he is known for writing the autobiographical novel La Confession d'un enfant du siècle (The Confession of a Child of the Century).

== Biography ==
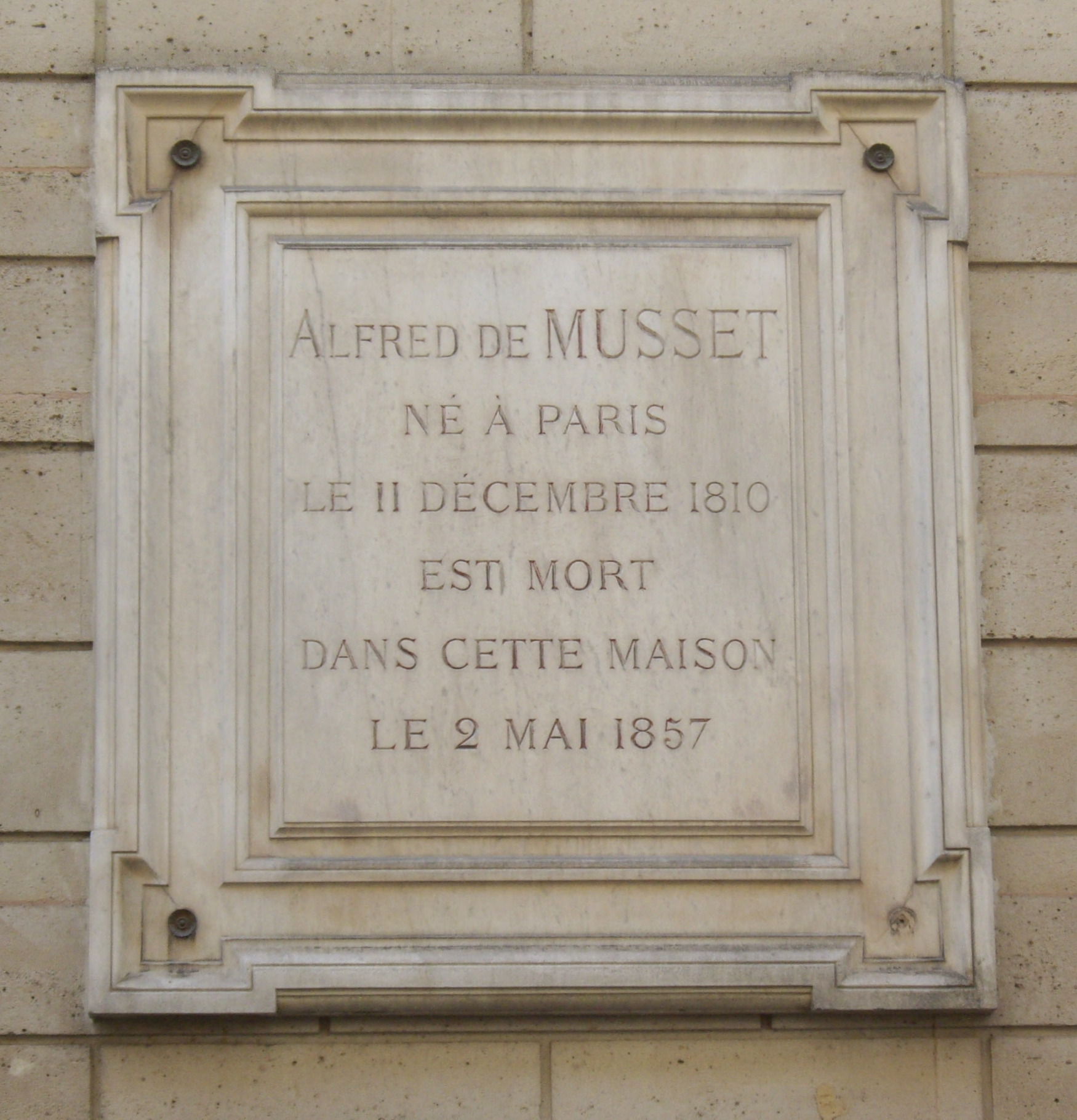
Commemorative plaque, 6 rue du Mont-Thabor, Paris

Musset was born in Paris. His family was upper-class but poor; his father worked in various key government positions, but never gave his son any money. Musset's mother came from similar circumstances, and her role as a society hostess – for example her drawing-room parties, luncheons and dinners held in the Musset residence – left a lasting impression on young Alfred.

An early indication of his boyhood talents was his fondness for acting impromptu mini-plays based upon episodes from old romance stories he had read. Years later, elder brother Paul de Musset would preserve these and many other details, for posterity, in a biography of his famous younger brother.

Alfred de Musset entered the lycée Henri-IV at the age of nine, where in 1827 he won the Latin essay prize in the Concours général at age 17. With the help of Paul Foucher, Victor Hugo's brother-in-law, he began to attend, at the age of 17, the Cénacle, the literary salon of Charles Nodier at the Bibliothèque de l'Arsenal. After attempts at careers in medicine (which he gave up owing to a distaste for dissections), law, drawing, English and piano, he became one of the first Romantic writers, with his first collection of poems, Contes d'Espagne et d'Italie (1829, Tales of Spain and Italy). By the time he reached the age of 20, his rising literary fame was already accompanied by a sulphurous reputation fed by his dandy side.

He was the librarian of the French Ministry of the Interior under the July Monarchy. His politics were of a liberal stamp, and he was on good terms with the family of King Louis Philippe. During this time he also involved himself in polemics during the Rhine crisis of 1840, caused by the French prime minister Adolphe Thiers, who as Minister of the Interior had been Musset's superior. Thiers had demanded that France should own the left bank of the Rhine (described as France's "natural boundary"), as it had under Napoleon, despite the territory's German population. These demands were rejected by German songs and poems, including Nikolaus Becker's Rheinlied, which contained the verse: "Sie sollen ihn nicht haben, den freien, deutschen Rhein ..." (They shall not have it, the free, German Rhine). Musset answered to this with a poem of his own: "Nous l'avons eu, votre Rhin allemand" (We've had it, your German Rhine).

The tale of his celebrated love affair with George Sand in 1833–1835 is told from his point of view in his autobiographical novel La Confession d'un Enfant du Siècle (The Confession of a Child of the Century) (1836), which was made into a 1999 film, Children of the Century, and a 2012 film, Confession of a Child of the Century, and is told from her point of view in her Elle et lui (1859). Musset's Nuits (Nights) (1835–1837) traces the emotional upheaval of his love for Sand from early despair to final resignation. He is also believed to be the anonymous author of Gamiani, or Two Nights of Excess (1833), a lesbian erotic novel which was rumored to be modeled on Sand.

Outside of his relationship with Sand he was a well-known figure in brothels, and is widely accepted to be the anonymous author-client who beat and humiliated the author and courtesan Céleste de Chabrillan, also known as La Mogador.

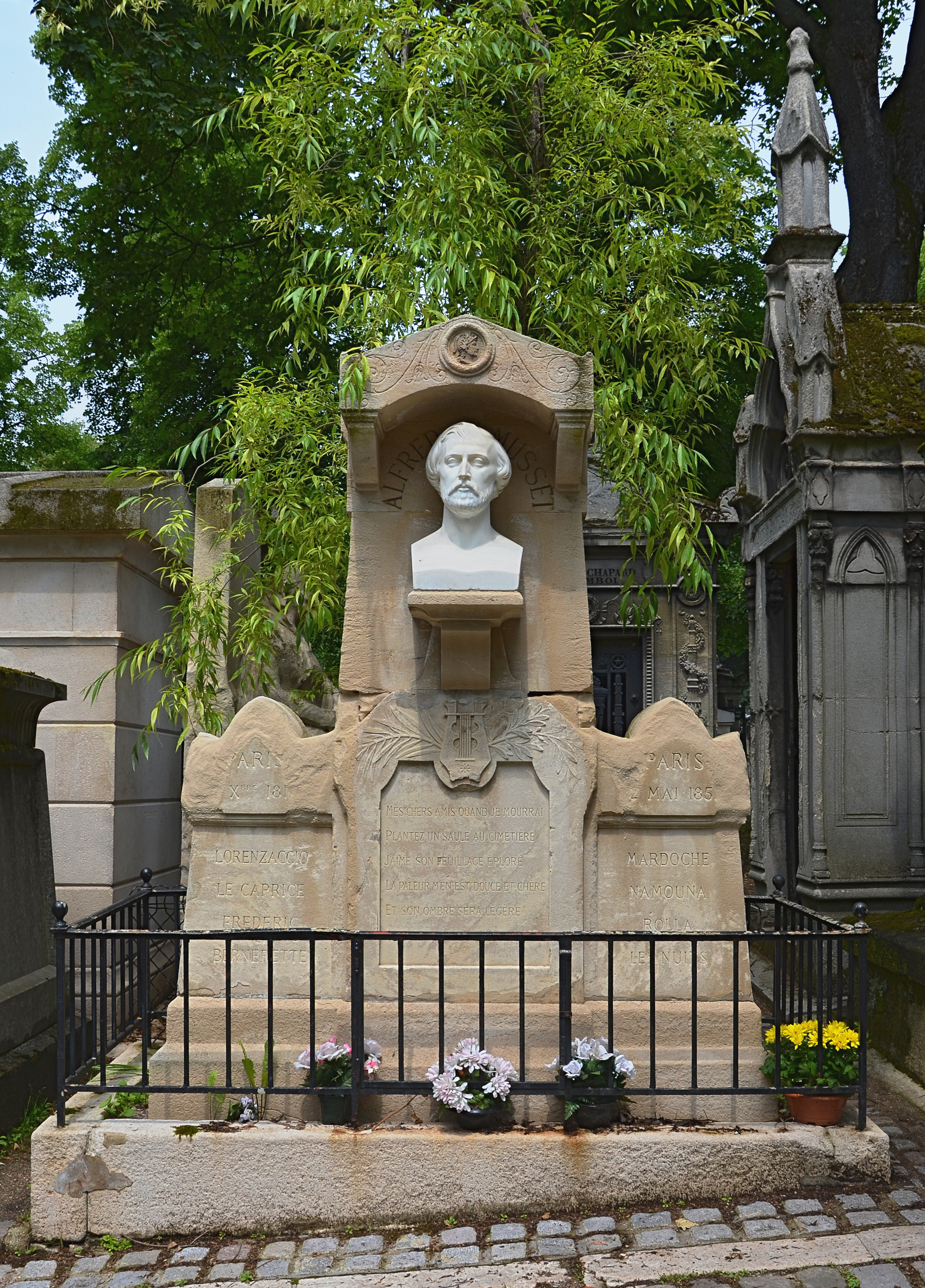
Tomb of Alfred de Musset in Père Lachaise Cemetery

Musset was dismissed from his post as librarian by the new minister Ledru-Rollin after the revolution of 1848. He was, however, appointed librarian of the Ministry of Public Instruction in 1853.

On 24 April 1845, Musset received the Légion d'honneur at the same time as Balzac, and was elected to the Académie Française in 1852 after two failed attempts in 1848 and 1850.

Alfred de Musset died in his sleep in Paris in 1857. The cause was heart failure, the combination of alcoholism and a longstanding aortic insufficiency. One symptom that had been noticed by his brother was a bobbing of the head as a result of the amplification of the pulse; this was later called de Musset's sign. He was buried in Père Lachaise Cemetery in Paris.

== Reception ==
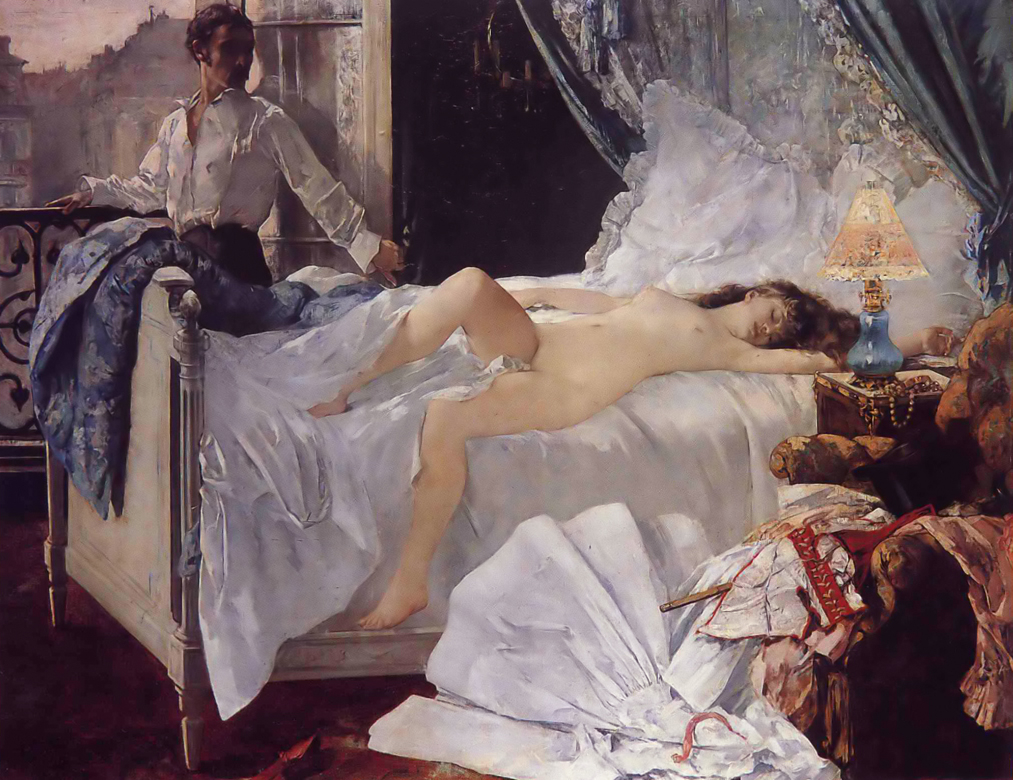
Rolla by Henri Gervex, 1878

The French poet Arthur Rimbaud was highly critical of Musset's work. Rimbaud wrote in his Letters of a Seer (Lettres du Voyant) that Musset did not accomplish anything because he "closed his eyes" before the visions (letter to Paul Demeny, May 1871).

Director Jean Renoir's La règle du jeu (The Rules of the Game) was inspired by Musset's play Les Caprices de Marianne.

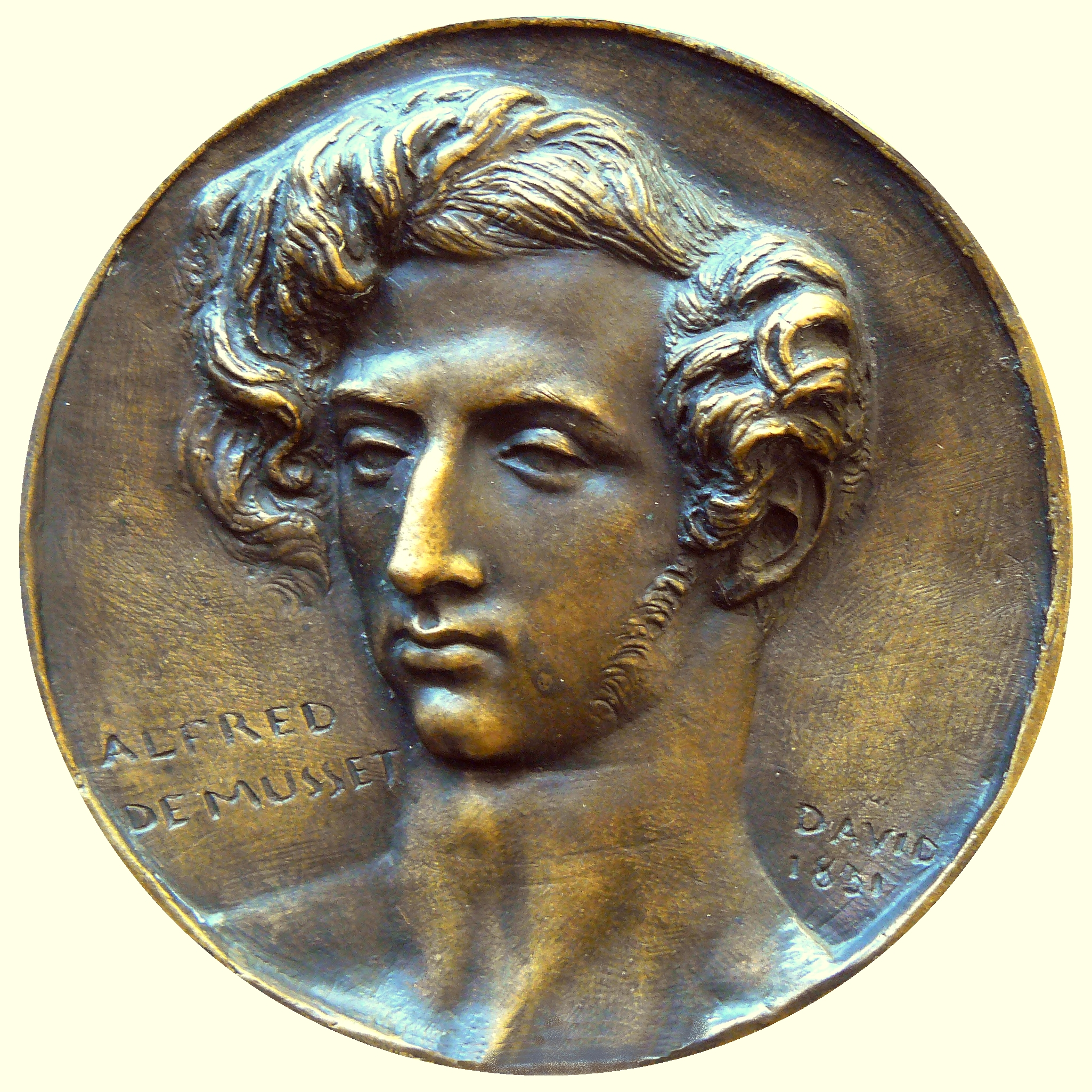
Medallion portrait of Alfred de Musset by David d’Angers (1831)

Henri Gervex's 1878 painting Rolla was based on a poem by De Musset. It was rejected by the jury of the Salon de Paris for immorality, since it features suggestive metaphors in a scene from the poem, with a naked prostitute shown after having sex with her client, but the controversy helped Gervex's career.

Jean Anouilh's Eurydice (1941) employs an intertextually salient quote of Musset's play On ne badine pas avec l'amour II.5 (1834), "The Tirade of Perdican" — Vincent and Eurydice's Mother rekindle the glorious days of their earlier acting careers and their own amours, when once his on-stage performance of Perdican's tirade instigated their first dressing-room love scene.

== Music ==
Numerous (often French) composers wrote works using Musset's poetry during the 19th and early 20th century.

Opera

Georges Bizet's opera Djamileh (1871, with a libretto by Louis Gallet) is based on Musset's story Namouna. In 1872 Offenbach composed an opéra comique Fantasio with a libretto by Paul de Musset closely based on the 1834 play of the same name by his brother Alfred. Dame Ethel Smyth composed an opera based on the same work, that premiered in Weimar in 1898. The play La Coupe et les lèvres was the basis of Giacomo Puccini's opera Edgar (1889). Fortunio, a four-act opera by André Messager is based on Musset's 1835 comedy Le Chandelier.The libretto of Mary Rosselli Nissim’s opera Andrea del Sarto (1931) was by Antonio Lega based on writings by Musset.Les caprices de Marianne, a two-act opéra comique by Henri Sauguet (1954) is based on the play by Musset. The opera Andrea del Sarto (1968) by French composer Daniel-Lesur was based on Musset's play André del Sarto. Lorenzaccio, which takes place in Medici's Florence, was set to music by the musician Sylvano Bussotti in 1972.

Song

Bizet set Musset's poems "À une fleur" and "Adieux à Suzon" for voice and piano in 1866; the latter had previously been set by Chabrier in 1862. Pauline Viardot set Musset's poem "Madrid" for voice and piano as part of her 6 Mélodies (1884). The Welsh composer Morfydd Llwyn Owen wrote song settings for Musset's "La Tristesse" and "Chanson de Fortunio". Lili Boulanger's Pour les funérailles d'un soldat for baritone, mixed chorus and orchestra is a setting of several lines from Act IV of Musset's play La Coupe et les lèvres.

Instrumental music

Ruggero Leoncavallo's symphonic poem La Nuit de Mai (1886) was based on Musset's poetry. Mario Castelnuovo-Tedesco's Cielo di settembre, op. 1 for solo piano (1910) takes its name from a line of Musset's poem "A quoi rêvent les jeunes filles". The score, in the original publication, is preceded by that line, "Mais vois donc quel beau ciel de septembre…" Rebecca Clarke's Viola Sonata (1919) is prefaced by two lines from Musset's La Nuit de Mai.

Other

Shane Briant played Alfred de Musset in one episode of a 1974 TV drama series, Notorious Woman.

In 2007, Céline Dion recorded a song called "Lettre de George Sand à Alfred de Musset" for her album D'elles.

== Quotations ==
- "How glorious it is – and also how painful – to be an exception."
- "Man is a pupil, pain is his teacher."
- "Verity is nudity."

== Works ==
=== Poetry ===
- À Mademoiselle Zoé le Douairin (1826)
- Un rêve (1828)
- Contes d'Espagne et d'Italie (1830)
- La Quittance du diable (1830)
- La Coupe et les lèvres (1831)
- Namouna (1831)
- Rolla (1833)
- Perdican (1834)
- Camille et Rosette (1834)
- L'Espoir en Dieu (1838)
- La Nuit de mai (1835)
- La Nuit de décembre (1835)
- La Nuit d'août (1836)
- La Nuit d'octobre (1837)
- La Nuit d'avril (1838)
- Chanson de Barberine (1836)
- À la Malibran (1837)
- Tristesse (1840)
- Une Soirée perdue (1840)
- Souvenir (1841)
- Le Voyage où il vous plaira (1842)
- Sur la paresse (1842)
- Après une lecture (1842)
- Les Filles de Loth (1849)
- Carmosine (1850)
- Bettine (1851)
- Faustine (1851)
- Œuvres posthumes (1860)

=== Plays ===
- La Quittance du diable (1830)
- La Nuit vénitienne (1830)
  - a failure; from this time until 1847, his plays were published but not performed
- La Coupe et les lèvres (1831)
- À quoi rêvent les jeunes filles (1832)
- André del Sarto (1833)
- Les Caprices de Marianne (1833)
- Lorenzaccio (1833)
- Fantasio (1834)
- On ne badine pas avec l'amour (1834)
- La Quenouille de Barberine (1835)
- Le Chandelier (1835)
- Il ne faut jurer de rien (1836)
- Faire sans dire (1836)
- Un Caprice (1837)
  - first performed in 1847, and a huge success, leading to the performance of other plays
- Il faut qu'une porte soit ouverte ou fermée (1845)
- L'Habit vert (1849)
- Louison (1849)
- On ne saurait penser à tout (1849)
- L'Âne et le Ruisseau (1855)

=== Novels ===
- La Confession d'un enfant du siècle (The Confession of a Child of the Century, 1836)
- Histoire d'un merle blanc (The White Blackbird, 1842)

=== Short stories and novellas ===
- Emmeline (1837)
- Le Fils du Titien (1838)
- Frédéric et Bernerette (1838)
- Margot (1838)
- Croisilles (1839)
- Les Deux Maîtresses (1840)
- Histoire d'un merle blanc (1842)
- Pierre et Camille (1844)
- Le Secret de Javotte (1844)
- Les Frères Van Buck (1844)
- Mimi Pinson (1845)
- La Mouche (1853)

=== In English translation ===
- A Good Little Wife (1847)
- Selections from the Prose and Poetry of Alfred de Musset (1870)
- Tales from Alfred de Musset (1888)
- The Beauty Spot (1888)
- Old and New (1890)
- The Confession of a Child of the Century (1892)
- Barberine (1892)
- The Complete Writings of Alfred de Musset (1907)
- The Green Coat (1914)
- Fantasio (1929)
- Camille and Perdican (1961)
- Historical Dramas (1997)
- Lorenzaccio (1998)
- Twelve Plays (2001)

== Selected filmography ==
- On ne badine pas avec l'amour, directed by Gaston Ravel and Tony Lekain (France, 1924, based on the play On ne badine pas avec l'amour)
- Mimi Pinson, directed by Théo Bergerat (France, 1924, based on the poem Mimi Pinson)
- Hon, den enda, directed by Gustaf Molander (Sweden, 1926, based on the play Il ne faut jurer de rien)
- One Does Not Play with Love, directed by G. W. Pabst (Germany, 1926, based on the play On ne badine pas avec l'amour)
- The Rules of the Game, directed by Jean Renoir (France, 1939, inspired by the play Les Caprices de Marianne)
- Lorenzaccio, directed by Raffaello Pacini (Italy, 1951, based on the play Lorenzaccio)
- Mimi Pinson, directed by Robert Darène (France, 1958, based on the poem Mimi Pinson)
- No Trifling with Love, directed by Caroline Huppert (France, 1977, TV film, based on the play On ne badine pas avec l'amour)
- La Confession d'un enfant du siècle, directed by Claude Santelli (France, 1974, TV film, based on the novel Confession d'un enfant du siècle)
- Le Chandelier, directed by Claude Santelli (France, 1977, TV film, based on the play Le Chandelier)
- Il ne faut jurer de rien !, directed by Éric Civanyan (France, 2005, based on the play Il ne faut jurer de rien)
- Confession of a Child of the Century, directed by Sylvie Verheyde (France, 2012, based on the novel Confession d'un enfant du siècle)
- Two Friends, directed by Louis Garrel (France, 2015, loosely based on the play Les Caprices de Marianne)

== Iconography ==
Musset is one of the five characters in the painting George Sand dans l'atelier de Delacroix avec Musset, Balzac et Chopin [George Sand in Delacroix's studio with Musset, Balzac and Chopin] made by Peruvian painter Herman Braun-Vega at the request of the Museums of Châteauroux, France, in 2004, for the bicentenary of George Sand's birth. In his commentary on the painting, Braun-Vega evokes the relationship between Musset and George Sand. The painting was exhibited for the first time in 2004-2005 at the Couvent des Cordeliers in Châteauroux, France.
