= Belgian Revenge =

1922 film

- Directed by: Théo Bergerat
- Produced by: Hippolyte De Kempeneer
- Starring: Fernand Crommelynck
- Production company: Belga Films
- Release date: 1922
- Country: Belgium
- Languages: Silent; French/Flemish intertitles

Belgian Revenge (French:La revanche belge) is a 1922 Belgian silent film directed by Théo Bergerat and starring Fernand Crommelynck. War drama about a woman hero, in love with a military engineer and coveted by his odious collaborationist "krauts". She does not give in to the blackmail of a German who is lying to her about her fiancé's alleged death. The only remnant of the Belgian production of the Frenchman Bergerat.

== Cast ==
- Fernand Crommelynck as René Forgeois
- Bella Darms as Hélène Forestier
- Coursière as Ingénieur Forestier
- Jimmy O'Kelly as Paul Forgeois
- Varenne as Fritz Bauer

== Bibliography ==
- Philippe Rège. Encyclopedia of French Film Directors, Volume 1. Scarecrow Press, 2009.
