= The Judge (1921 film) =

1921 film

- Directed by: Théo Bergerat
- Written by: Michel Lévy
- Produced by: Hippolyte De Kempeneer
- Production company: Compagnie Belge des Films Cinématographiques
- Release date: 1921
- Country: Belgium
- Languages: Silent; French/Dutch intertitles

The Judge (French:Le juge) is a 1921 Belgian silent drama film directed by Théo Bergerat and starring Fernand Crommelynck.

== Cast ==
- Fernand Crommelynck as Le juge
- Auffrey as Madame Orlac
- Bella Darms as Régine Orlac
- Coursière as Maître Tabellion
- Mallé as Lerminier
- Valdo as Valet de chambre
- Anna Gody
- Léopold
- Jimmy O'Kelly

== Bibliography ==
- Philippe Rège. Encyclopedia of French Film Directors, Volume 1. Scarecrow Press, 2009.
