= Maxime Jacob =

French composer and organist

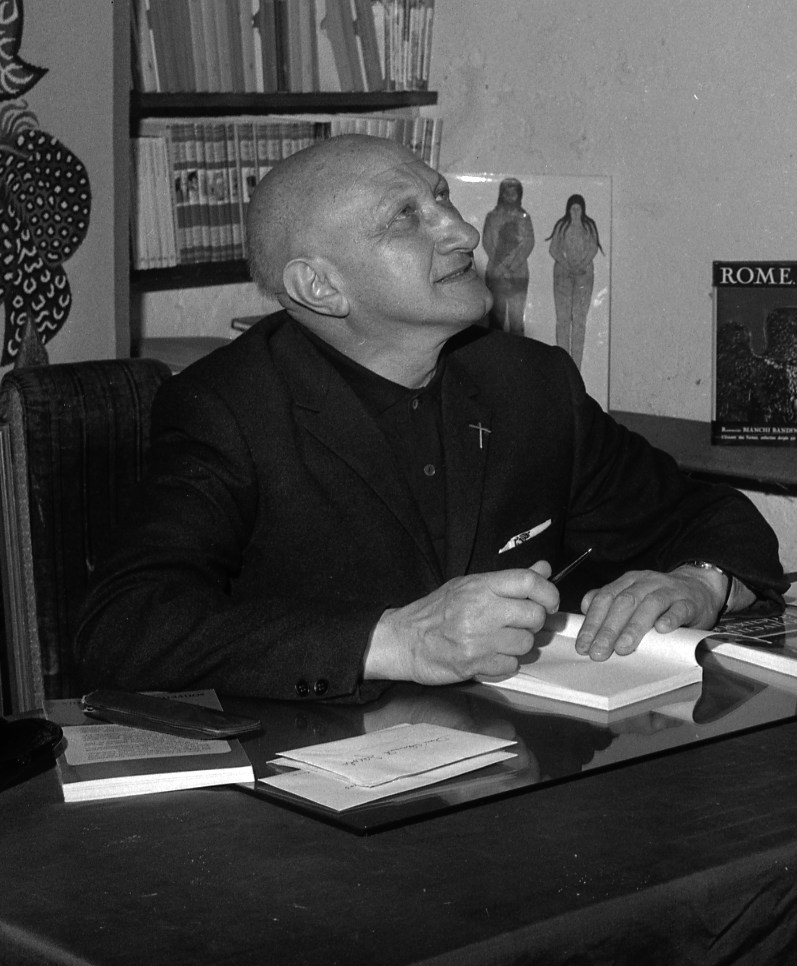
- Born: 13 January 1906
- Died: 26 February 1977 (aged 71)
- Education: Paris Conservatory
- Notable work: "Living God"; Ventre brûlé; ou La Mère folle
- Website: domclementjacob.com

Maxime Jacob, or Dom Clément Jacob, (13 January 1906 in Bordeaux – 26 February 1977 in En-Calcat Abbey, Dourgne, Tarn) was a French composer and organist.

== Biography ==
Jacob studied at the Paris Conservatory with Charles Koechlin and André Gedalge; an admirer of Darius Milhaud and Erik Satie, he was a member of the École d'Arcueil, a group of young composers sponsored by Satie after his rupture with his previous group of protégés, Les Six. Other members of this short-lived group included Henri Cliquet-Pleyel, Henri Sauguet and Roger Désormière.

In 1927, Jacob worked with Antonin Artaud at the Théâtre Alfred Jarry composing the score for his production of Ventre brûlé; ou La Mère folle (1927).^{:252}

In 1929, Jacob converted from Judaism to Catholicism (influenced by Jacques Maritain) and became a Benedictine monk at En-Calcat Abbey. He would go on to study organ with Maurice Duruflé, as well as Gregorian chant.

Jacob also published two books, L'art et la grâce (1939) and Souvenirs a deux voix (1969).

In the English-speaking world, his hymn tune "Living God" in 77.77 meter with 77.77 refrain, used for I Received the Living God (J'ai reçu le Dieu vivant), is well known.

== Works ==
Vocal

- Par la Taille (opera, after Alfred Jarry)
- Le Vitrail de Sainte-Thérèse (oratorio, 1952)
- Joinville et Saint-Louis (oratorio, after Péguy, 1971)
- Les psaumes pour tous les temps (1966)
- ca. 400 stage songs

Orchestral

- Ouverture (1923)
- Piano Concerto, 1961

Chamber music

- 8 string quartets

Miscellaneous

- Piano pieces for Clément Doucet
- Livre d'orgue (1967)
