= Les caprices de Marianne =

Opera by Henri Sauguet

Les caprices de Marianne is a two-act opéra comique by Henri Sauguet with a French libretto by Jean-Pierre Gredy after the 1833 play The Moods of Marianne by Alfred de Musset. It was first performed at the Aix-en-Provence Festival in 1954, with the Orchestre de la Société des Concerts du Conservatoire conducted by Louis de Froment with the Chorale Élisabeth Brasseur.

The opera was broadcast on French radio ten days after the premiere, performed at the Théâtre des Champs-Élysées in 1956, with Graziella Sciutti, Jacques Jansen and Michel Sénéchal, and was recorded in 1959 (conducted by Manuel Rosenthal). More recently, the opera has been staged by Compiègne (2006) and Dijon (2007).

== Roles ==
| Role | Voice type | Premiere Cast, 20 July 1954 (Conductor: Louis de Froment) |
|---|---|---|
| Marianne | soprano | Graziella Sciutti |
| Hermia (mother of Coelio) | mezzo-soprano | Irène Companeez |
| Coelio | tenor | Jean Capocci |
| Octave | baritone | Jean-Christophe Benoît |
| Claudio | baritone | Jacques Linsolas |
| Tibia | tenor | Louis-Jacques Rondeleux |
| Innkeeper | tenor | Gérard Friedmann |
| Chanteur de sérénades | baritone | Robert Tropin |
| La duègne | | Henri Bedex |

== Synopsis ==
The setting is Naples. The opera opens with musicians serenading Marianne beneath her balcony. Coelio is a young man desperately trying to win the love of Marianne, who is already married to Claudio, a Napolitan magistrate. Not daring to declare himself to her, Coelio appeals to his friend Octave, a libertine, and cousin of Claudio. She refuses to love Coelio but, as a result of her husband's rebukes, on a whim, announces her decision to take a lover, and offers Octave an assignation. However, Octave, after a certain amount of hesitation, decides to let Coelio take up the assignation with Marianne instead. Meanwhile, Claudio suspects his wife of being unfaithful to him. He determines to hire swordsmen to kill the lover when he gets near the house. Coelio falls into the trap, is ambushed and killed, believing that his friend Octave has betrayed him, by sending him in his place to the assignation. In the last scene, Octave declares to Marianne that he never had serious feelings for her. The end is tragic for all: Coelio is dead, Octave renounces the pleasures of life, Marianne's heart is broken.
