= Gabriel de Gravone =

French actor (1887–1972)

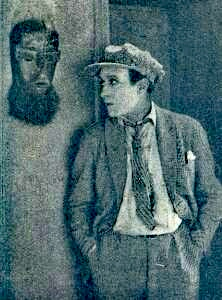
- Gabriel de Gravone in a 1922 film
- Born: 21 November 1887; Ajaccio, Corsica, France
- Died: 5 December 1972 (aged 85); Marseille, Bouches-du-Rhône, France
- Other name: Antoine Paul André Faggianelli
- Occupation: Actor
- Years active: 1910–1928 (film)

Gabriel de Gravone (French pronunciation: [ɡabʁijɛl d(ə) ɡʁavɔn]; 1887–1972) was a French stage actor. He acted in forty films during the silent era, as well as directing one which he also starred in.

== Selected filmography ==
- La Roue (1923)
- Mimi Pinson (1924)
- The Fiery Cavalcade (1925)
- Michel Strogoff (1926)

== Bibliography ==
- Abel, Richard. The Ciné Goes to Town: French Cinema, 1896-1914. University of California Press, 1994.
