= Hippolyte De Kempeneer =

Belgian film producer and director

- Born: 1876; Anderlecht, Belgium
- Died: August 1944
- Occupation(s): Director, Producer

Hippolyte De Kempeneer (1876–1944) was a Belgian film producer and director. He was one of the pioneers of the Belgian film industry during the silent era.

== Selected filmography ==
=== Producer ===
- A Farmyard Drama (1921)
- The Judge (1921)
- Ramparts of Brabant (1921)
- Belgian Revenge (1922)
