= Henri Cliquet-Pleyel =

French composer

- Born: 12 March 1894
- Died: 9 May 1963 (aged 69)

Henri Cliquet-Pleyel was a French composer born on 12 March 1894 in Paris and died in that city on 9 May 1963. In 1913 he undertook musical studies at the Conservatoire de Paris under teachers André Gedalge and Eugène Cools, from whom he learned counterpoint and fugue, before taking up composition studies with Charles Koechlin, who had taught such diverse musicians as Poulenc, Milhaud (members of the group Les Six) and Cole Porter.

He obtained a position as director of vocal studies at the school in Cannes, later transferring to Deauville, and finally to Aix-les-Bains. In 1923 he co-founded the School of Arcueil, with fellow musicians, Henri Sauguet, Maxime Jacob, and Roger Désormière. The four were devotees of the music of Erik Satie, who was living in Arcueil at the time. The musicians of this group dedicated themselves to the musical goals of clarity, simplicity, and a commitment to French musical tradition, including French humor, which they felt was typified by Satie's music. The group was short-lived, and did not long survive Satie's death in 1925. Cliquet-Pleyel is one of the few notable composers known to have written a piano concerto for the right hand alone (dozens of concerti for left-hand alone exist).

== Selected List of Works ==
=== With Orchestra ===
- The Beautiful Enchantress, operetta (1938)
- Transbaïkal for piano and orchestra (1938)
- Spain, for chorus and orchestra (1938)
- Sardana (1938)
- Concerto for piano (right hand) and orchestra (1939)
- Concerto for piano and orchestra (1940)
- Phaedra, for choir and orchestra (1940)
- Song of the Columns, for women's chorus and orchestra (1945)
- Scenes for Ballet (1962)
- Beetles, for voice and small orchestra (1962)

=== For Piano ===
- Three Pieces in the Style of Erik Satie [Trois pièces à la manière d'Erik Satie] (1921)
- Suite (1922)
- 1st Tango (1920)
- 2nd Tango (192?)
- 3rd Tango (1921)
- 4th Tango (1922)
- 5th Tango (192?)
- 1st Blues (Come Along) (1922)
- 2nd Blues (Far Away) (1922)
- Menuet (1926)
- Le Tombeau de Satie (1928)
- Seven Etudes for piano (1935)
- Childish Evenings, for piano, four hands (1937)
- Sonata (1940)
- Seven Preludes (1942)
- 6 Mazurkas (1958)

=== Other Ensembles ===
- Sonata #1 for Violin and Piano
- Sonata #2 for Violin and Piano
- Sonata #3 for Violin and Piano
- Trio for Piano and Strings
- String Quartet #1 (1912)
- String Quartet #2 (1923)
- Trio for Piano, Clarinet and Harp (1962)
- Incidental music for several films.
