= Carine (play) =

Carine ou la jeune fille folle de son âme is a Belgian play by Fernand Crommelynck. It was first published in 1929.
