= Ramparts of Brabant =

1921 film

- Directed by: Théo Bergerat
- Written by: Michel Lévy
- Produced by: Hippolyte De Kempeneer
- Production company: Compagnie Belge des Films Cinématographiques
- Release date: 1921
- Country: Belgium
- Languages: Silent; French/Dutch intertitles

Ramparts of Brabant (Dutch:De omwalling van Brabant, French:Rempart du Brabant) is a 1921 Belgian silent film directed by Théo Bergerat.

== Bibliography ==
- Philippe Rège. Encyclopedia of French Film Directors, Volume 1. Scarecrow Press, 2009.
