= The Moods of Marianne =

Play by Alfred de Musset

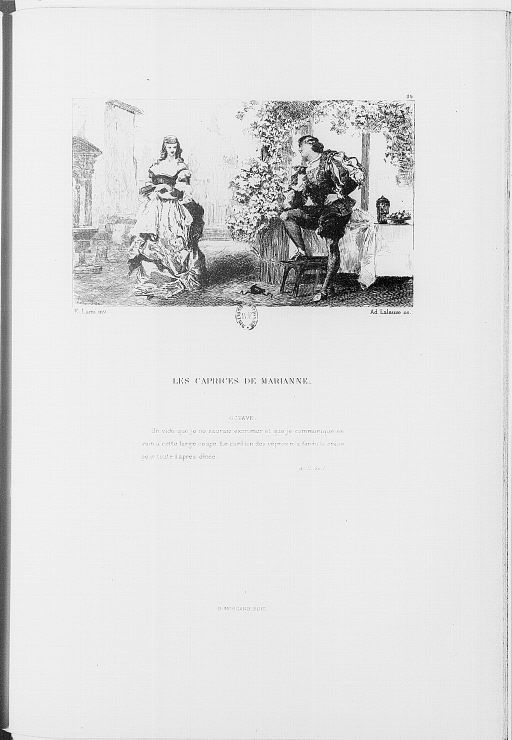
19th-century publication of Les Caprices de Marianne

The Moods of Marianne (French: Les Caprices de Marianne) is an 1833 play by the French dramatist Alfred de Musset. It served as the basis for Jean Renoir's film The Rules of the Game (1939).

The play was first published on 15 May 1833 in La Revue des Deux Mondes. It was played at the Comédie-Française on 14 June 1851.

An opera by Henri Sauguet, Les caprices de Marianne, was also based closely on the play.
