= En-Calcat Abbey =

Benedictine monastery in Southern France

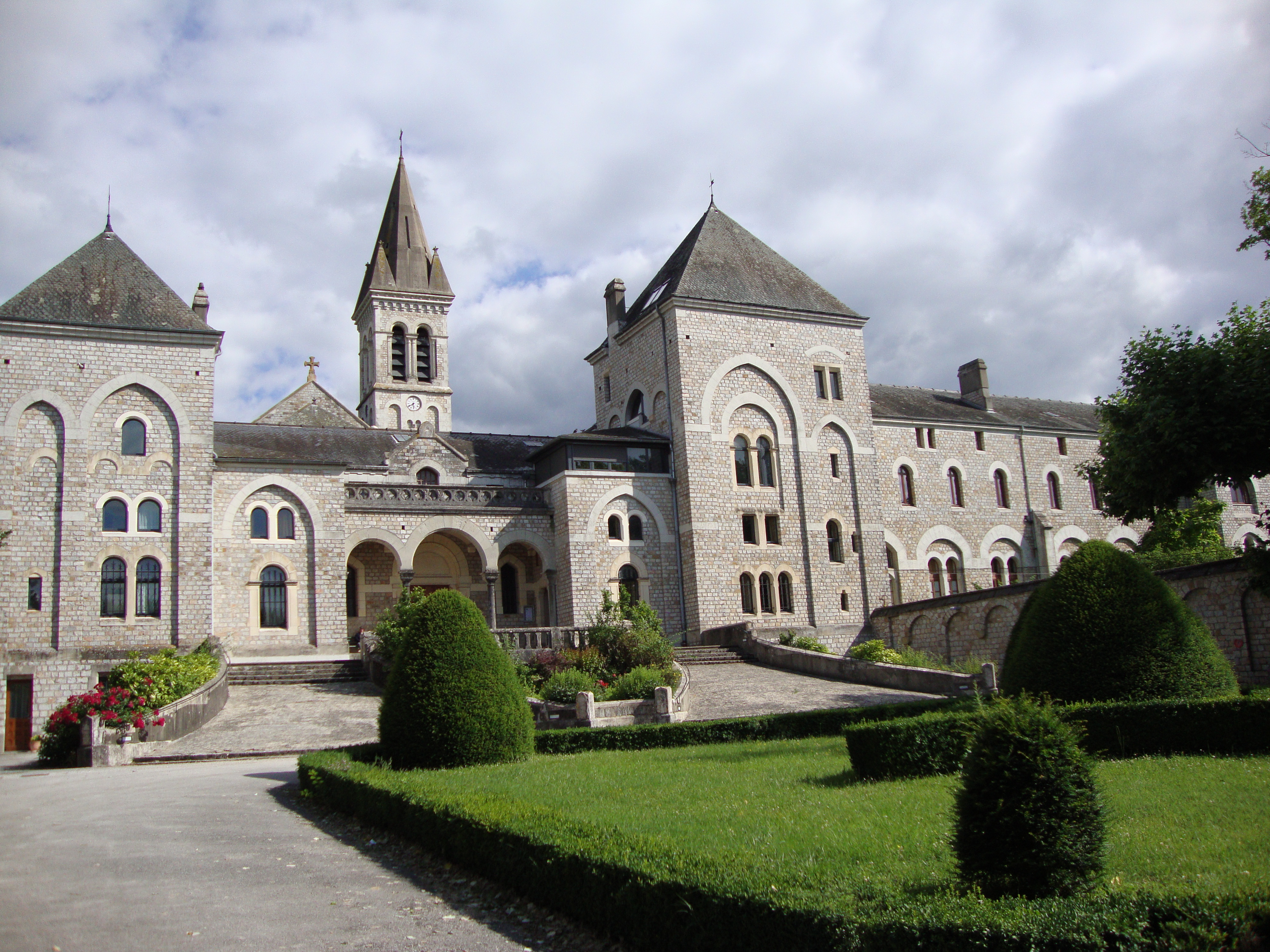
- En-Calcat Abbey

- Location within France
- Interactive map of En-Calcat Abbey

Monastery information
- Other name: Saint Benoît d'En Calcat
- Order: Subiaco Cassinese Congregation, OSB
- Established: 1890
- Mother house: Aiguebelle Abbey
- Dedication: Saint Benedict
- Diocese: Roman Catholic Archdiocese of Albi

People
- Founder: Romain Banquet

Site
- Location: Dourgne, Tarn, France
- Coordinates: 43°29′50″N 2°9′3″E
- Public access: Yes
- Website: www.encalcat.com

En-Calcat Abbey or Saint-Benoît d'En Calcat is a Benedictine abbey in Dourgne, France, belonging to the Subiaco Cassinese Congregation.

== History ==
=== Foundation and exile ===
The monastery of Saint Benoît d'En Calcat was founded in 1890 together with the monastery of Sainte Scholastique de Dourgne and both were granted the status of abbey in 1896. Though many men entered the monastery, the growth was ended by the Associations Bill of 1901. The monastic community was forced to leave France in 1903 and lived then for a few years in Paramon and then in Besalu before they were allowed to return in 1918. Though they were not living in France, 33 of the 45 monks were mobilised to fight in the French army during the First World War and 10 monks were killed.

After returning to En-Calcat in 1918, the monastery thrived and attracted many famous people. Maxime Jacob, a French composer and Jewish convert to Catholicism, became monk at the monastery in 1929 and was for many years the chief organist. A friend of Maxime, the painter Guy de Chaunac-Lanzac, entered the monastery in 1930 and became a priest in 1937. He became famous for his tapestries which were exhibited internationally and died at the monastery in 1997.

Robert Schuman stayed at the monastery between 1942 and 1944 where he followed the liturgical hours.

=== Post-war period and foundations ===
Angelo Giuseppe Roncalli, later pope John XXIII, went for his annual retreat to the monastery in November 1948. Lambert Beauduin, a pioneer in the European liturgical revival and proponent for ecumenism between Christian churches, was sent to the monastery due to his controversial ideas and influenced many monks here, staying until 1951.

As the monastic community grew, it send out some monks to revive the priory of Madiran which was later transferred to Tournay. In 1952, upon receiving an invitation from the archbishop of Rabat to found a monastery in Morocco, the monastery sent 20 monks which founded the monastery of Toumliline. In 1961, the monastery founded the Abbaye de l'Ascension in Dzogbégan, Togo.

The pianist Thierry de Brunhoff entered the monastery in 1974.

=== 21st century ===
As of February 2023, the community has around 40 monks and has been led since the death of Père Abbé Emmanuel Roques in February 2021 by Brother Columba Jennesson who acts as Prior-Administrator.

The monastery is known for producing zithers known as psaltérion which are used among others by the Society of the Precious Blood.

The monastery participates in the Dialogue Interreligieux Monastique and as such has hosted Zen monks and nuns in its premises.

== Abbots ==
- Père Romain Banquet (1890 - 1923)
- Père Marie Cambarou (1923 - 1943)
- Père Marie de Floris (1943 - 1953)
- Père Germain Barbier (1953 - 1964)
- Père Abbé Dominique Hermant (1965 - 1978)
- Père Abbé Thierry Portevin (1979 - 1996)
- Père Abbé André-Jean Demaugé (1996 - 2009)
- Père Abbé David d'Hamonville (2009 - 2020)
- Père Abbé Emmanuel Roques (2020 - 2021)

== Gallery ==
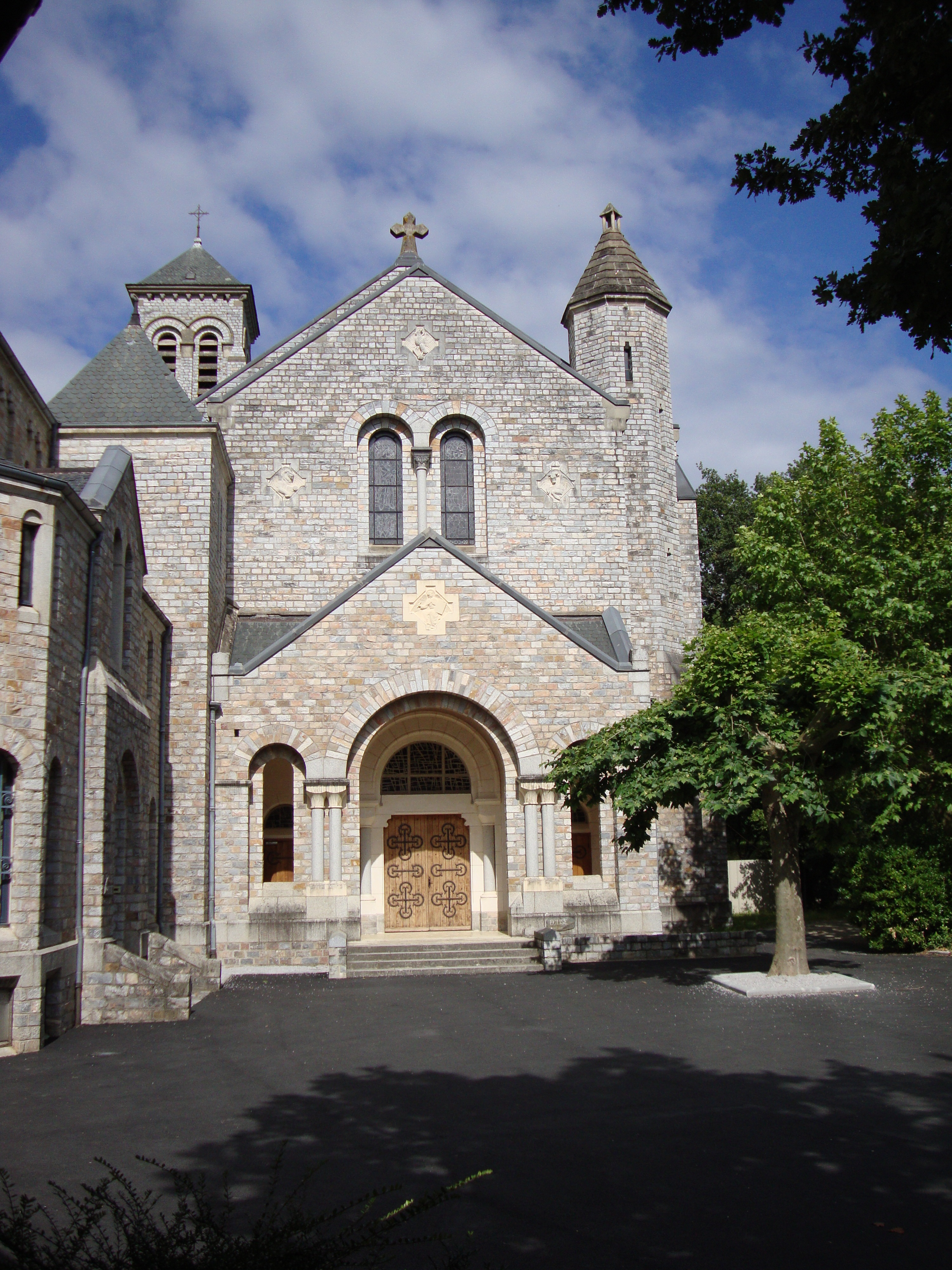
The church of the abbey.

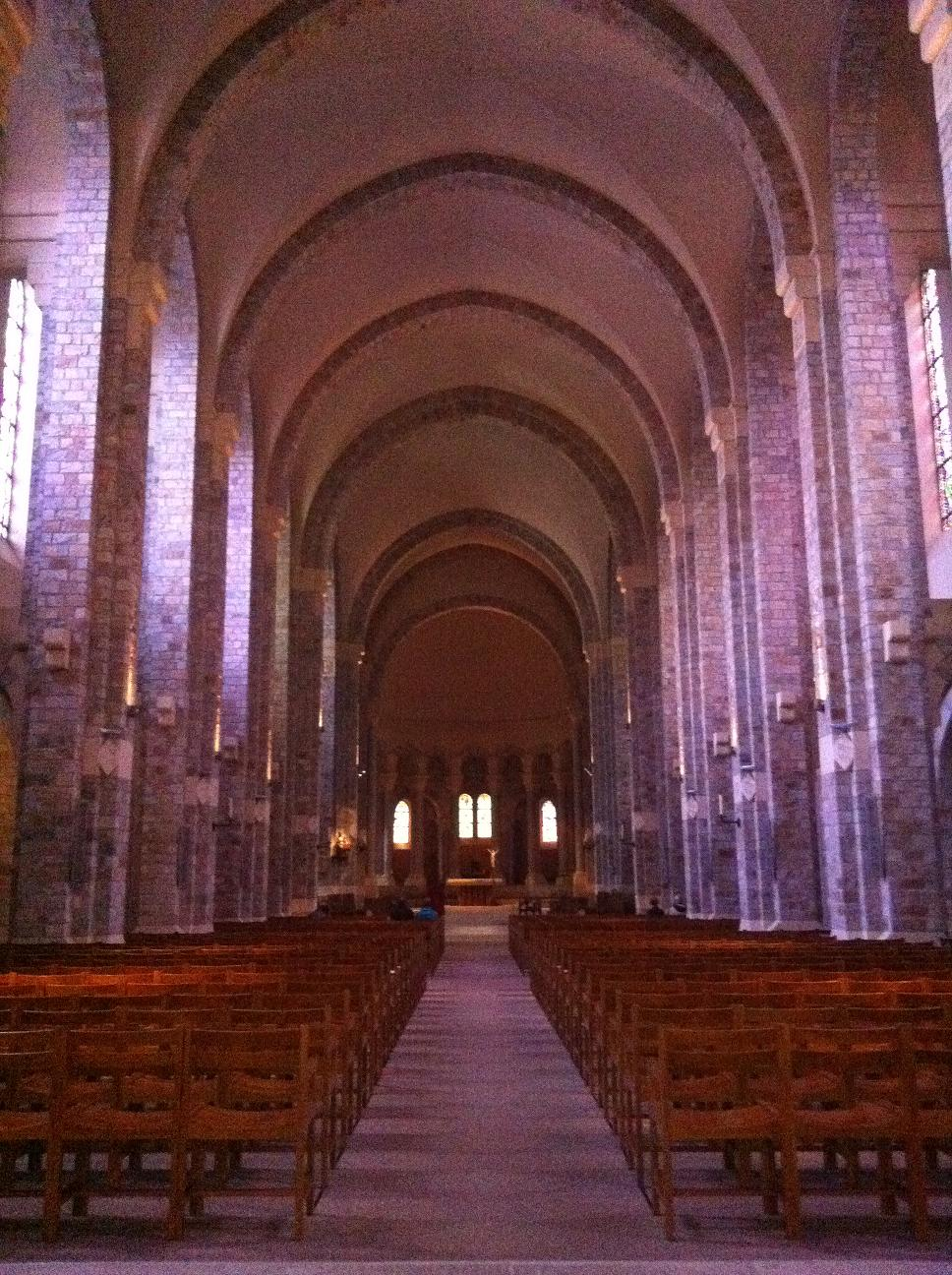
Interior of the church of the abbey.

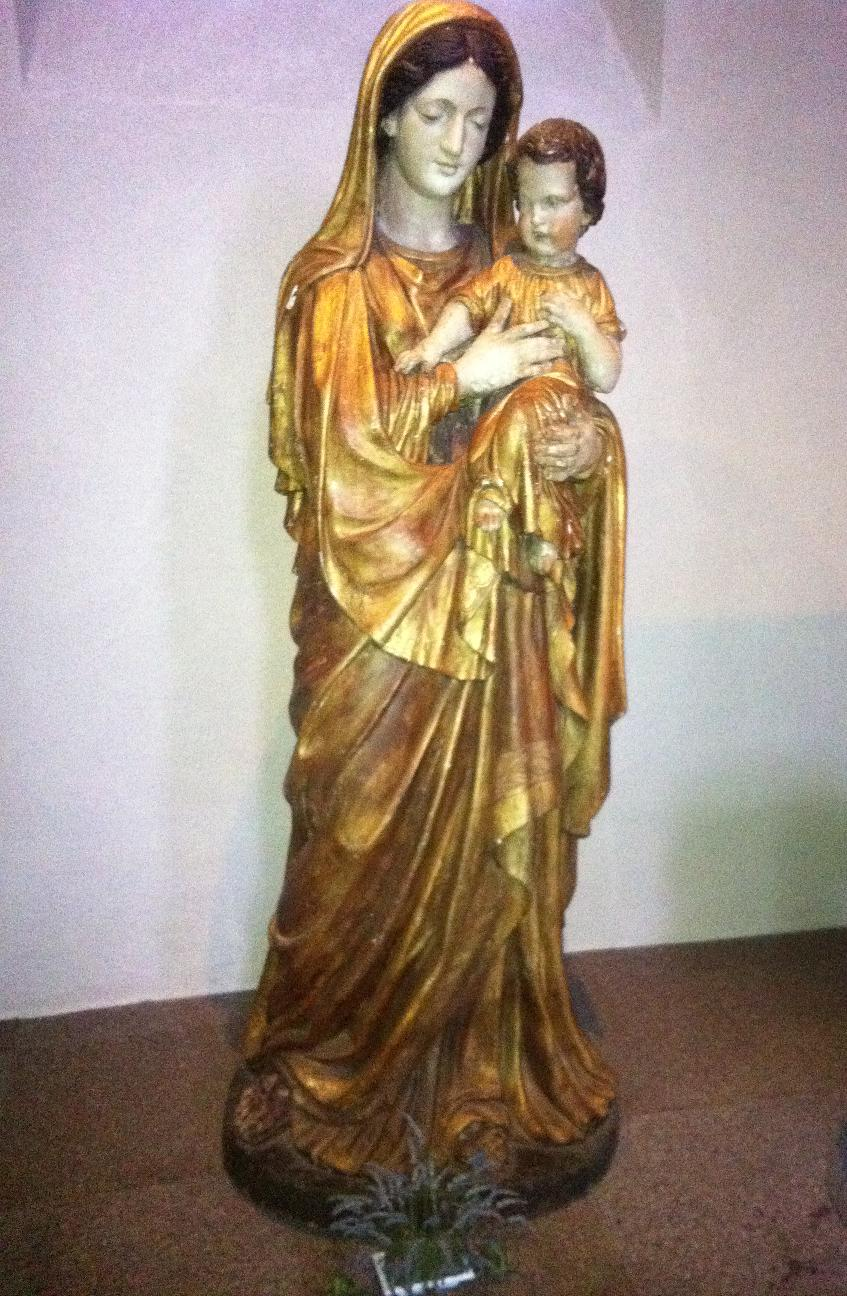
Statue of the Virgin Mary with the infant Jesus in the church of the abbey.

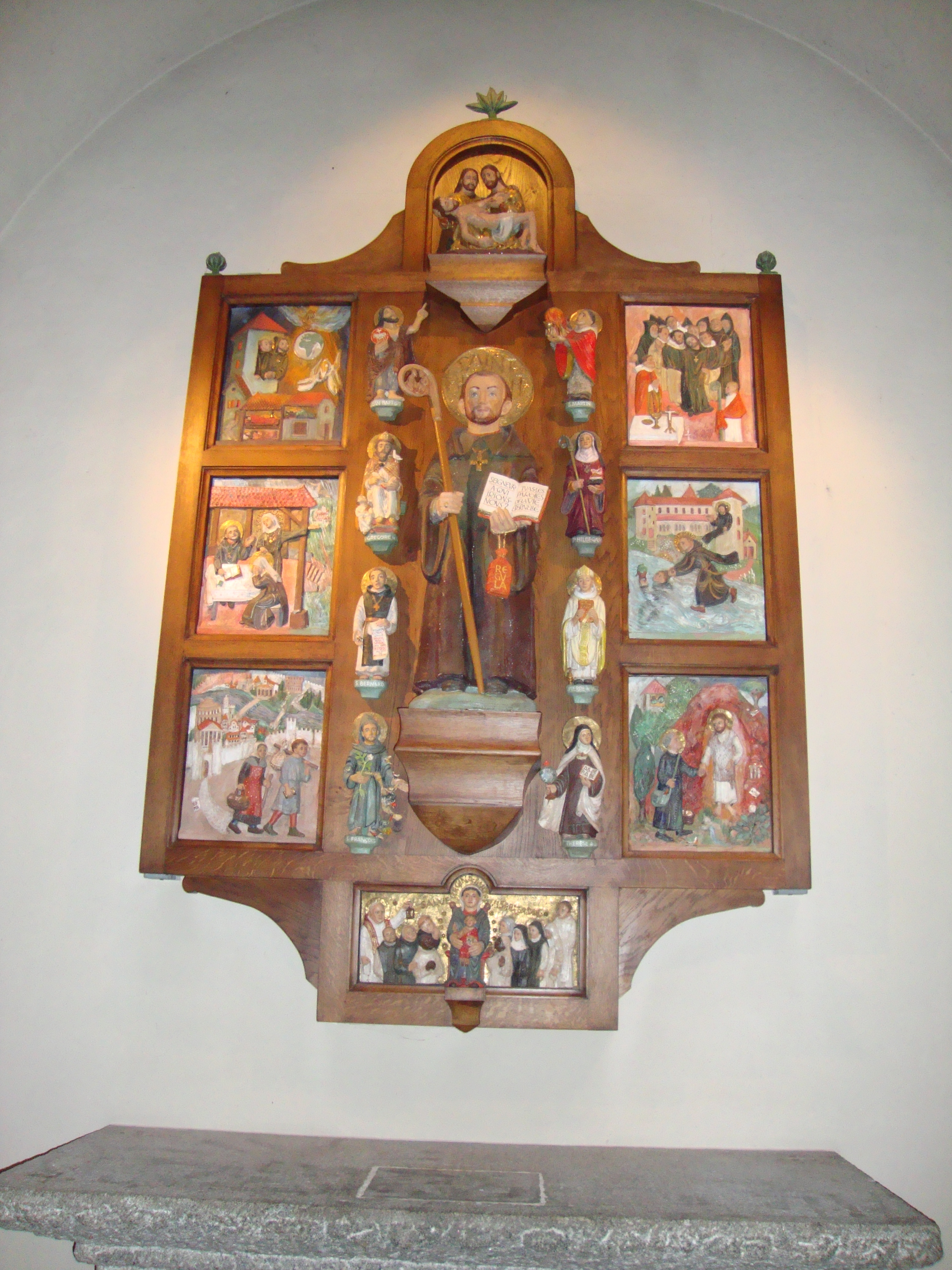
Statue of Saint Benedict in the church of the abbey.

== Sources ==
- "Abbaye d'En Calcat- Dourgne - Tarn". Abbaye d'En Calcat (in French). Abbaye Saint Benoît d'En Calcat.
- Bethune, Pierre-Francois De (2002). By Faith and Hospitality: The Monastic Tradition as a Model for Interreligious Encounter. Gracewing Publishing. ISBN 978-0-85244-548-8.
- Bicknell, Julia (9 November 2022). "'Spirit of Toumliline' Interfaith Inquiry Lives On 50 Years After Moroccan Monastery Closed". Religion Unplugged. Institute for Nonprofit News.
- Boucher, Jean-Jacques (23 February 2015). Le dictionnaire de la soie: Découvrir son histoire de ses origines jusqu'à nos jours (in French). Fernand Lanore. ISBN 978-2-85157-763-4.
- Bruneau-Boulmier, Rodolphe (2 November 2016). "Thierry de Brunhoff". France Musique (in French).
- Doidge, Norman (27 January 2015). The Brain's Way of Healing: Remarkable Discoveries and Recoveries from the Frontiers of Neuroplasticity. Penguin. ISBN 978-0-698-19143-3.
- Gollin, James (2001). Pied Piper: The Many Lives of Noah Greenberg. Pendragon Press. ISBN 978-1-57647-029-9.
- Haste, Amanda J. (20 October 2023). Music and Identity in Twenty-First-Century Monasticism. Taylor & Francis. ISBN 978-1-000-98594-8.
- Iuliu-Marius, Morariu (January 2017). "The French Benedictine Monasticism During The First World War.: Case Study: The Abbey of Saint Benoit from En Calcat". Studia Monastica. LXI (1): 189–196.
- Palayret, Jean-Marie (26 October 2022). "The Schuman Declaration of 9 May 1950". In Gehler, Michael; Guasconi, Maria Eleonora; Pierini, Francesco (eds.). Narrating Europe: Speeches on European Integration (1946–2020). Nomos Verlag. ISBN 978-3-7489-2827-0.
- Peters, Greg (15 January 2020). Exploring the Future of Christian Monasticisms. MDPI. ISBN 978-3-03928-024-7.
- Roncalli, Angelo Giuseppe (9 July 2000). Journal of a Soul. A&C Black. ISBN 978-0-567-12306-0.
- Trevor, Meriol (2000). Pope John. Gracewing Publishing. ISBN 978-0-85244-480-1.
