= Tournay Abbey =

Benedictine monastery in Tournay, Hautes-Pyrénées, France

Coordinates: 43.1800°N 0.2453°E

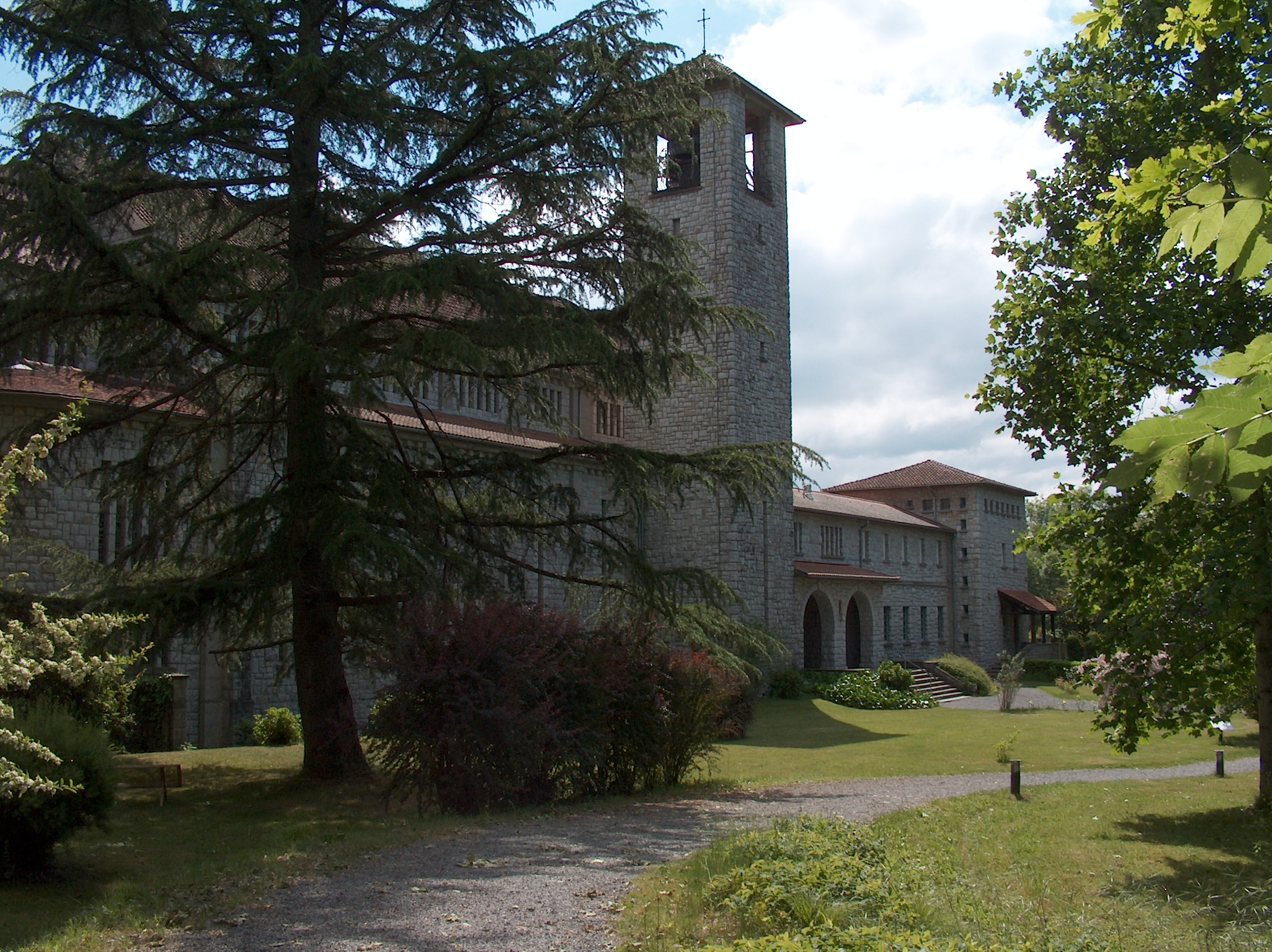
Exterior of Tournay Abbey

Tournay Abbey (French: Abbaye Notre-Dame de Tournay) is an active Benedictine monastery in Tournay, Hautes-Pyrénées, France.

A priory was first established on the site in the 11th century, which became an abbey in the 17th century. It was suppressed during the French Revolution.

A new abbey was founded in the 1930s in Madiran and was transferred to Tournay in 1952, the year after construction of a new monastery. The building was completed in 1958.

The abbey remains active and houses a community of approximately 20 monks.

== See also ==
- List of Benedictine monasteries in France
