= Mimi Pinson (1924 film) =

1924 film

- Directed by: Théo Bergerat
- Written by: Alfred de Musset (poem)
- Produced by: Charles de Gerschel
- Starring: Gabriel de Gravone; Simone Vaudry; Maud Garden
- Cinematography: Gaston Brun
- Production company: Etablissements Louis Aubert
- Distributed by: Etablissements Louis Aubert
- Release date: 5 September 1924
- Country: France
- Languages: Silent; French intertitles

Mimi Pinson is a 1924 French silent drama film directed by Théo Bergerat and starring Gabriel de Gravone, Simone Vaudry, and Maud Garden. It is based on a poem of the same name by Alfred de Musset.

== Cast ==
- Gabriel de Gravone as Frédéric
- Simone Vaudry as Mimi Pinson
- Maud Garden as Musette
- Armand Bernard as Coline
- Louis Dory as Alfred de Musset
- Marcelle Schmitt as Indiana
- Sandy Petit as Madame Machard

== Bibliography ==
- Philippe Rège. Encyclopedia of French Film Directors, Volume 1. Scarecrow Press, 2009.
