= Fernand Crommelynck =

Belgian dramatist

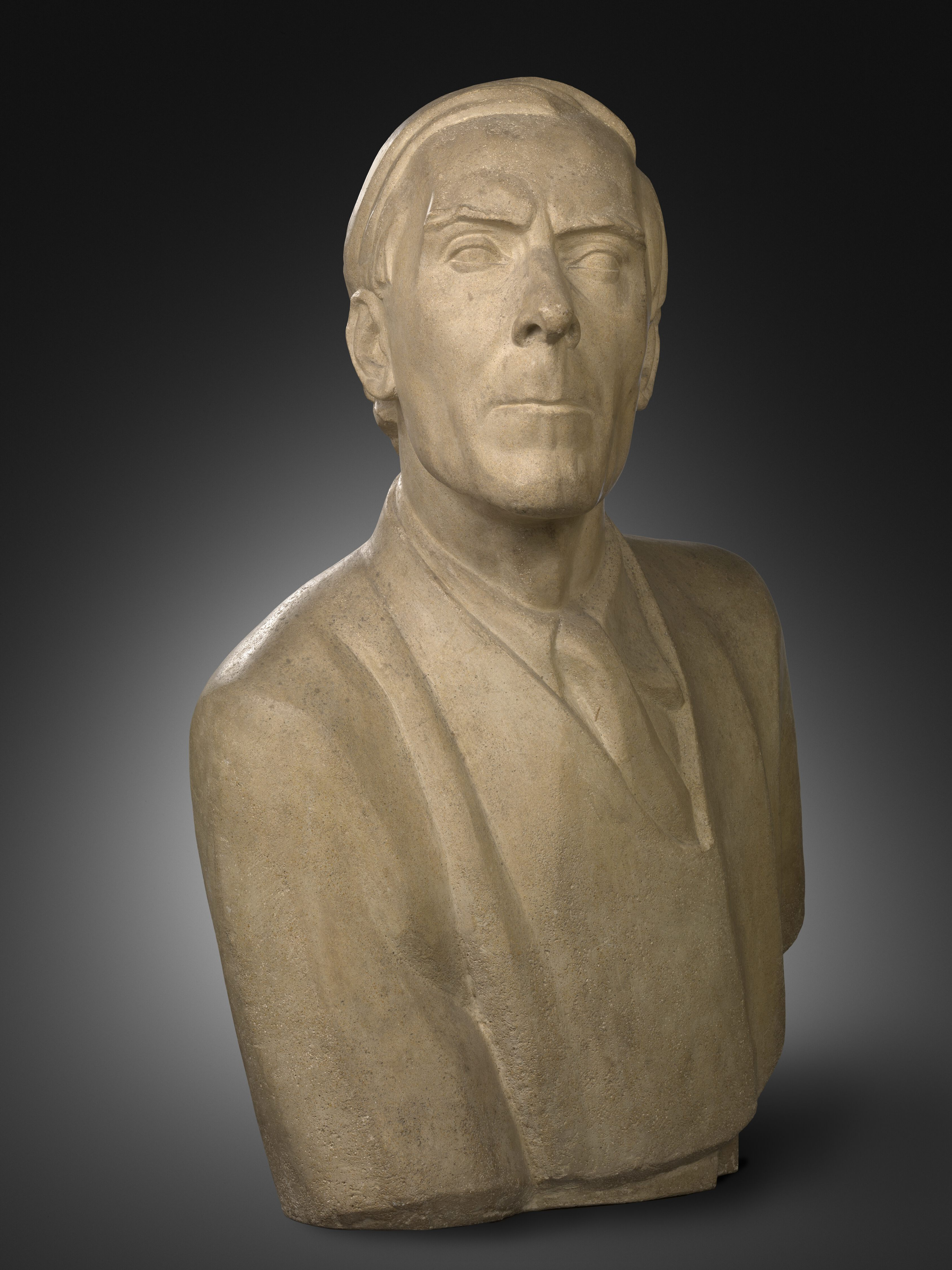
- Born: 19 November 1886; Paris, France
- Died: 17 March 1970 (aged 83); Saint-Germain-en-Laye, France
- Occupation: dramatist

Fernand Crommelynck (19 November 1886 – 17 March 1970) was a Belgian dramatist. His work is known for farces in which commonplace weaknesses are developed into monumental obsessions.

== Biography ==
He was born into a family of actors, the child of a French mother and a Belgian father, and he himself was also an actor. His sons Aldo Crommelynck (1931–2009), Piero (1934–2001), and Milan were renowned master printmakers, who worked with Pablo Picasso and many other major artists of the twentieth century. His brother was the artist and engraver Albert Crommelynck.

In his earliest works Crommelynck already demonstrated the grasp of style and content that in his maturity culminated in works of great poetic force. The dramatic structure in Nous n'irons plus au bois (1906), Le sculpteur de masques (1908) and Le marchand de regrets (1913), was already based on the logical development of an absurd premise. French composer Cecile Paul Simon set Le marchand de regrets to music. Crommelynck's masterpiece was Le Cocu magnifique (1920), a 'lyrical farce' on the theme of a lover's jealousy. Staged with constructivist sets by Vsevolod Meyerhold – the first of their kind – the theatre play was such a hit that Crommelynck was able to give up acting and devote himself to writing. In Tripes d'or (1926) he satirized the passion for money and the spurious prestige it confers, while in Carine, ou la jeune fille folle de son âme (1929) he contrasted love and sensuality in the story of a chaste young girl who is faithful to her ideals of love to the bitter end.

Both in language and dramatic technique, Crommelynck has been one of the most lyrical and original writers of the 20th century theatre.

== Select works ==
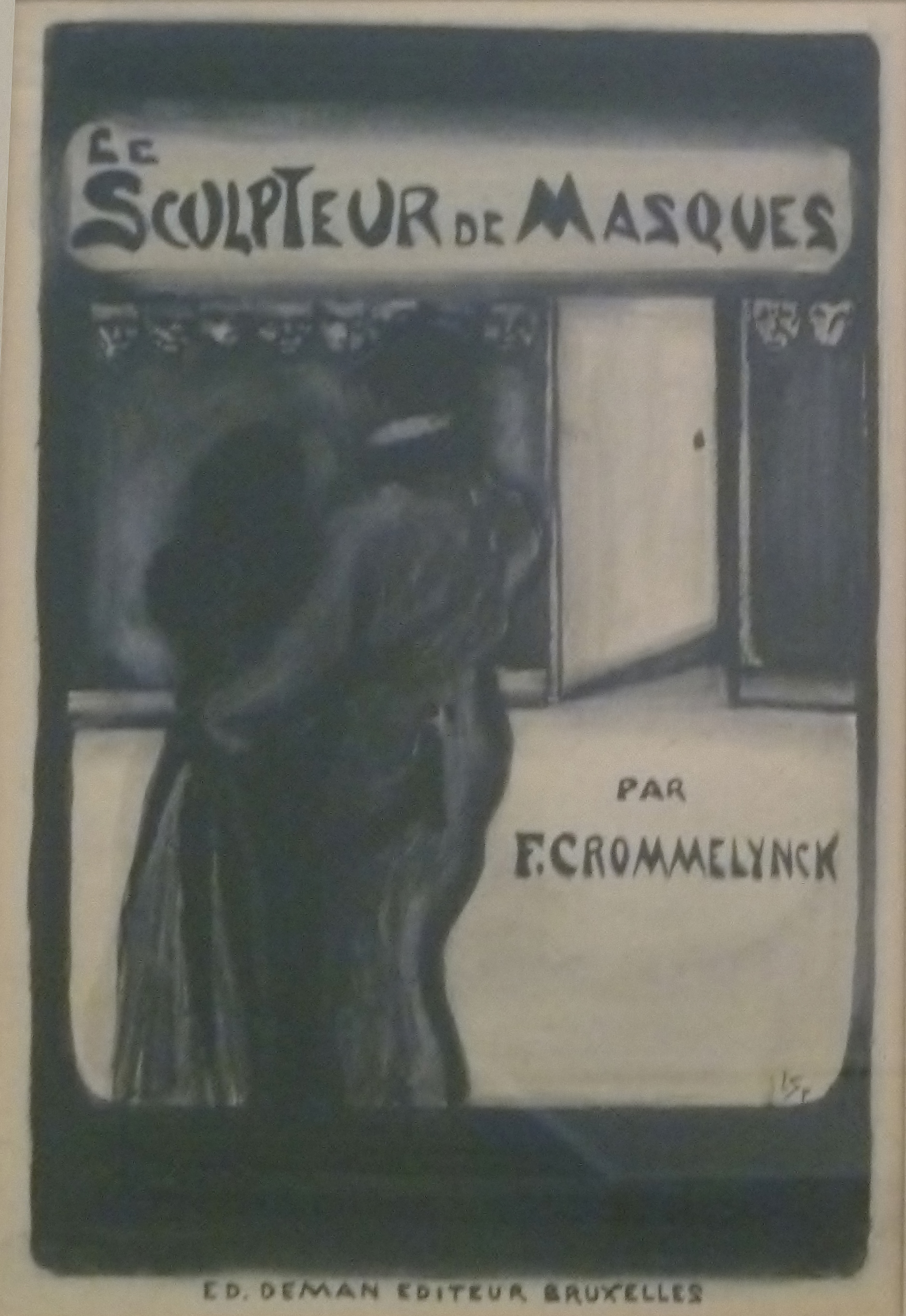
Illustration by Léon Spilliaert for Le Sculpteur de Masques (Brussels, Edmond Deman, 1908)

- Le Sculpteur de masques (1908)
- L'Histoire de Minna Claessens (Alfred Machin, 1912)
- L'agent Rigolo et son chien policier (Alfred Machin, 1912)
- Le Marchand de regrets (1913)
- Maudite soit la guerre (Alfred Machin, 1914)
- Le Cocu magnifique (drama)' (1921)
- Les Amants puérils (1921)
- Tripes d'or (1930)
- Le Cadavre n° 5 (Gaston Schoukens, 1932)
- Une Femme qu'a le cœur trop petit (1934)
- Chaud et froid (1936)

== Selected filmography ==
- The Judge (1921)
- Miarka (1937)
- The Novel of Werther (1938)
- The City of Lights (1938)
- I Am with You (1943)

== See also ==
- Vsevolod Meyerhold State Theatre
