= Dourgne =

- Commune
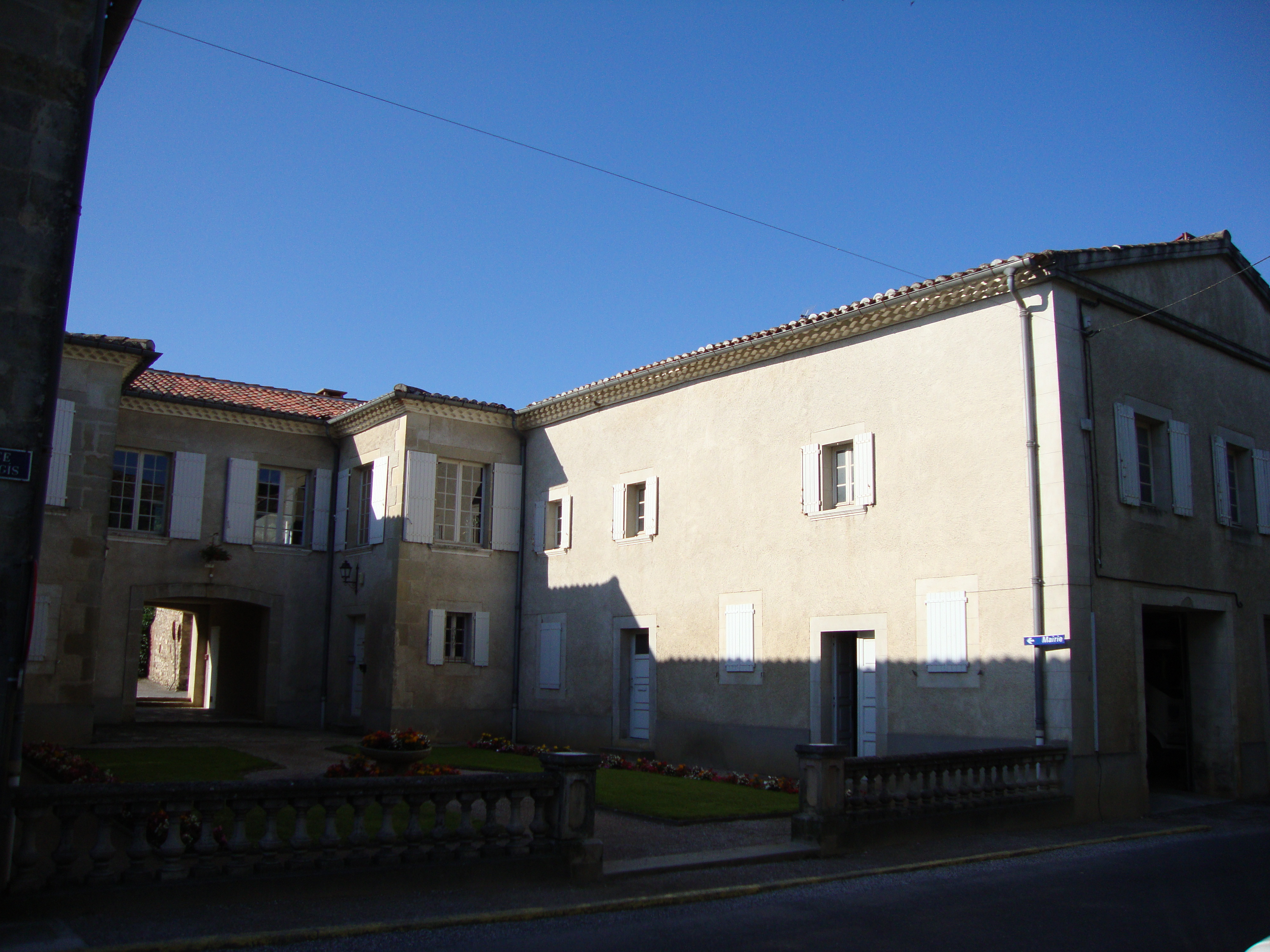
- The town hall in Dourgne

- Coat of arms
- Location of Dourgne
- Location within France Location within Occitanie
- Coordinates: 43°29′11″N 2°08′21″E
- Country: France
- Region: Occitania
- Department: Tarn
- Arrondissement: Castres
- Canton: La Montagne noire

Government
  - Mayor (2020–2026): Dominique Cougnaud
- Area^{1}: 22.75 km^{2} (8.78 sq mi)
- Elevation: 250 m (820 ft)
- Highest elevation: 804 m (2,638 ft)
- Lowest elevation: 186 m (610 ft)
- Population (2023): 1,313
  - Density: 57.71/km^{2} (149.5/sq mi)
- Time zone: UTC+01:00 (CET)
  - Summer (DST): UTC+02:00 (CEST)
- INSEE/Postal code: 81081 /81110
- ^{1} French Land Register data, which excludes lakes, ponds, glaciers > 1 km^{2} (0.386 sq mi or 247 acres) and river estuaries.

Dourgne (French pronunciation: [duʁɲ]; Occitan: Dornha) is a commune in the Tarn department and Occitanie region of southern France.

== Demographics ==
Historical population
Year	Pop.	±% p.a.
1968	1,299	—
1975	1,250	−0.55%
1982	1,233	−0.20%
1990	1,211	−0.22%
1999	1,186	−0.23%
2007	1,286	+1.02%
2012	1,303	+0.26%
2017	1,315	+0.18%
2023	1,313	−0.03%
Source: INSEE

== Sites and monuments ==
Dourgne is known for its two Benedictine monasteries, the En-Calcat Abbey and the Sainte Scholastique Abbey, both founded in 1890.

You can see the ruins of the Château de Castellas, destroyed by Simon de Montfort.

== See also ==
- Communes of the Tarn department
- List of Benedictine monasteries in France
