= Théo Bergerat =

French film director

- Born: 29 January 1876; Paris, France
- Died: 25 August 1934 (aged 58); Poissy, France
- Other name: Théophile Bergerat
- Occupations: Director, Writer
- Years active: 1918–1924 (film)

Théo Bergerat (January 29, 1876 – August 25, 1934) was a French film director of the silent era.

== Selected filmography ==
- Ramparts of Brabant (1921)
- Belgian Revenge (1922)
- Mimi Pinson (1924)

== Bibliography ==
- Philippe Rège. Encyclopedia of French Film Directors, Volume 1. Scarecrow Press, 2009.
