= Henri Sauguet =

French composer (1901–1989)

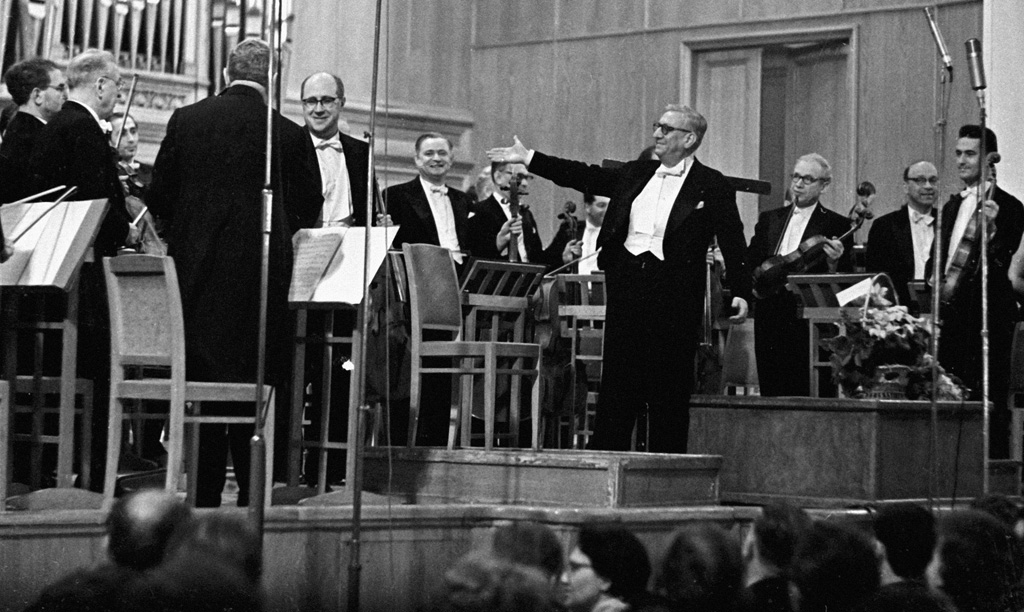
Sauguet (fourth right), with Mstislav Rostropovich (fourth left), in the Grand Hall of the Moscow Conservatory, 1964

Henri-Pierre Sauguet-Poupard (18 May 1901 – 22 June 1989) was a French composer.

Born in Bordeaux, he adopted his mother's maiden name as part of his professional pseudonym. His output includes operas, ballets, four symphonies (1945, 1949, 1955, 1971), concertos, chamber and choral music and numerous songs, as well as film music. Although he experimented with musique concrète and expanded tonality, he remained opposed to particular systems and his music evolved little: he developed tonal or modal ideas in smooth curves, producing an art of clarity, simplicity and restraint.

== Career ==
Sauguet started learning the piano at home when he was five years old. Later he was taught by the organist of the church of Sainte-Eulalie de Bordeaux. On the mobilization of his father in 1914, he was required to earn a living at a very young age. Eventually employed by the Prefecture of Montauban in 1919–1920, he formed a friendship with Joseph Canteloube, a former pupil of Vincent d'Indy. Together they collected and harmonized traditional songs under the title Chants d'Auvergne (Songs of Auvergne). During this period he continued his musical education with local organists and served as organist at the small church of St-Vincent de Floirac just outside the city (1916–22). Sacred music, and especially organ arrangements, were to influence him for the rest of his life. This is manifest in the pieces he later wrote for organ and various combinations of instruments: Oraisons, with four saxophones (1976); Ne moriatur in aeternum, with trumpet (1979); Church Sonata, with string quintet (1985).

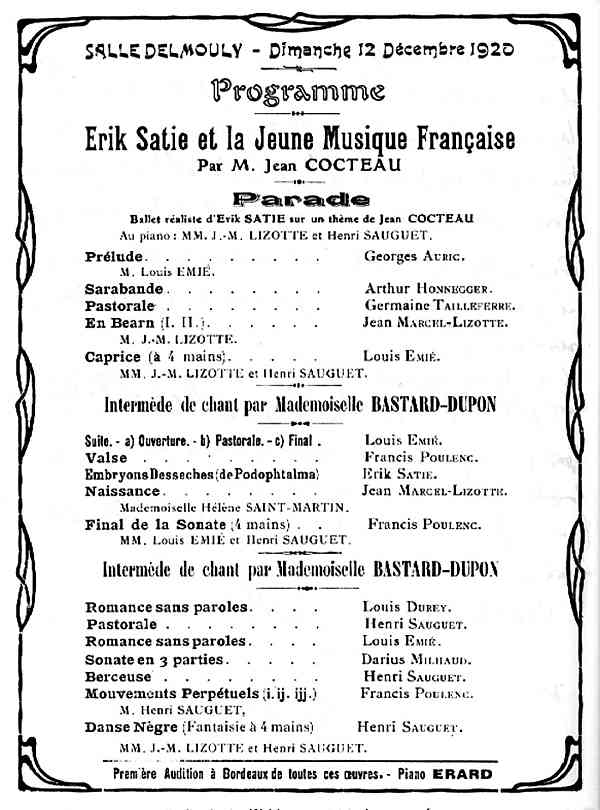
Programme of 12 December 1920 concert in Paris

When Henri Collet dubbed a group of Paris-based composers Les Six, Sauguet started writing to one of its members, Darius Milhaud. He also began to refer to himself and two Bordeaux friends, Louis Emié and Jean-Marcel Lizotte (another composer and a poet-musician), as 'Les Trois'. Their first concert took place on 12 December 1920. This included performances of works by 'Les Six' (Georges Auric, Louis Durey, Arthur Honegger, Germaine Tailleferre, Darius Milhaud and Francis Poulenc), together with "Erik Satie et la jeune musique française". Among compositions by all three local exponents of 'the young French music' were Sauguet's four-handed Danse nègre and his Pastorale pour piano.

Sauguet's correspondence with Milhaud led to the latter asking to see some of the younger man's works. He wrote a piano suite called Trois Françaises (Three Frenchwomen) which so impressed Milhaud that he encouraged Sauguest to move to Paris. Arriving in October 1921, he found work as a secretary at the Guimet Museum. For some six years he studied composition with Charles Koechlin, whom he credited with helping him understand music within its own context and find his own voice.

In 1923, together with three other admirers of Satie's music (Henri Clicquot-Pleyell, Roger Désormière, Maxime Jacob), Sauguet formed the 'School of Arcueil', named after the location of Satie's home. With his support, they had their first concert on 25 October 1923 at Théâtre des Champs-Elysées. In 1924 Erik Satie introduced Sauguet to Serge Diaghilev, the flamboyant impresario of the Ballets Russes, and he wrote his first ballet, Les Roses (Roses) that year. In 1927 Diaghilev's company produced the ballet La Chatte (The Cat) with music by Sauguet, which premiered in Monte Carlo on April 30. The story is about a young man who falls in love with a cat, which assumes a human form through the intervention of Aphrodite. As they make love, the cat-woman sees a mouse and cannot resist chasing it, whereupon she changes back into a cat. The work was choreographed by the young George Balanchine.

Sauguet gained his greatest popularity with his ballets, of which he wrote over twenty. The best of these, and the work by which he is most known outside France, was Les Forains (1945) about a talented, slightly tattered, but ultimately hopeful travelling circus troupe. He also wrote numerous works for radio, television, stage, and film, and a large quantity of chamber and other instrumental works, including solos for harmonica and musical saw, but his particular talent was vocal music. He worked ten years on La chartreuse de Parme (The Charterhouse of Parma, 1936) - based on Stendhal's novel - an opera that had a reputation in France as his most important work. Internationally, however, it was considered to be short on emotion and drama. Other operatic works include La Contrebasse (1930), La Gageure Imprévue (1942), Les Caprices de Marianne (1954) and Boule de Suif (1978).

The war period brought a change to Sauguet's work, which had previously been marked by his high spirits. He used his reputation during this time to help his Jewish friends but lost the oldest-established among them, Max Jacob, who died in the Drancy internment camp. At the war's end he completed his Symphony No. 1, known as Expiatoire (Expiatory), in tribute to the war's innocent victims. This was followed by his 2nd Symphony, known as The Allegorical or The Seasons, in 1949. His 3rd Symphony is known as I.N.R. and his 4th, a meditation on old age written as he approached the age of seventy, as Du Troisième Age (The Third Age). In 1945 he contributed incidental music to the premiere of La Folle de Chaillot, by Jean Giraudoux.

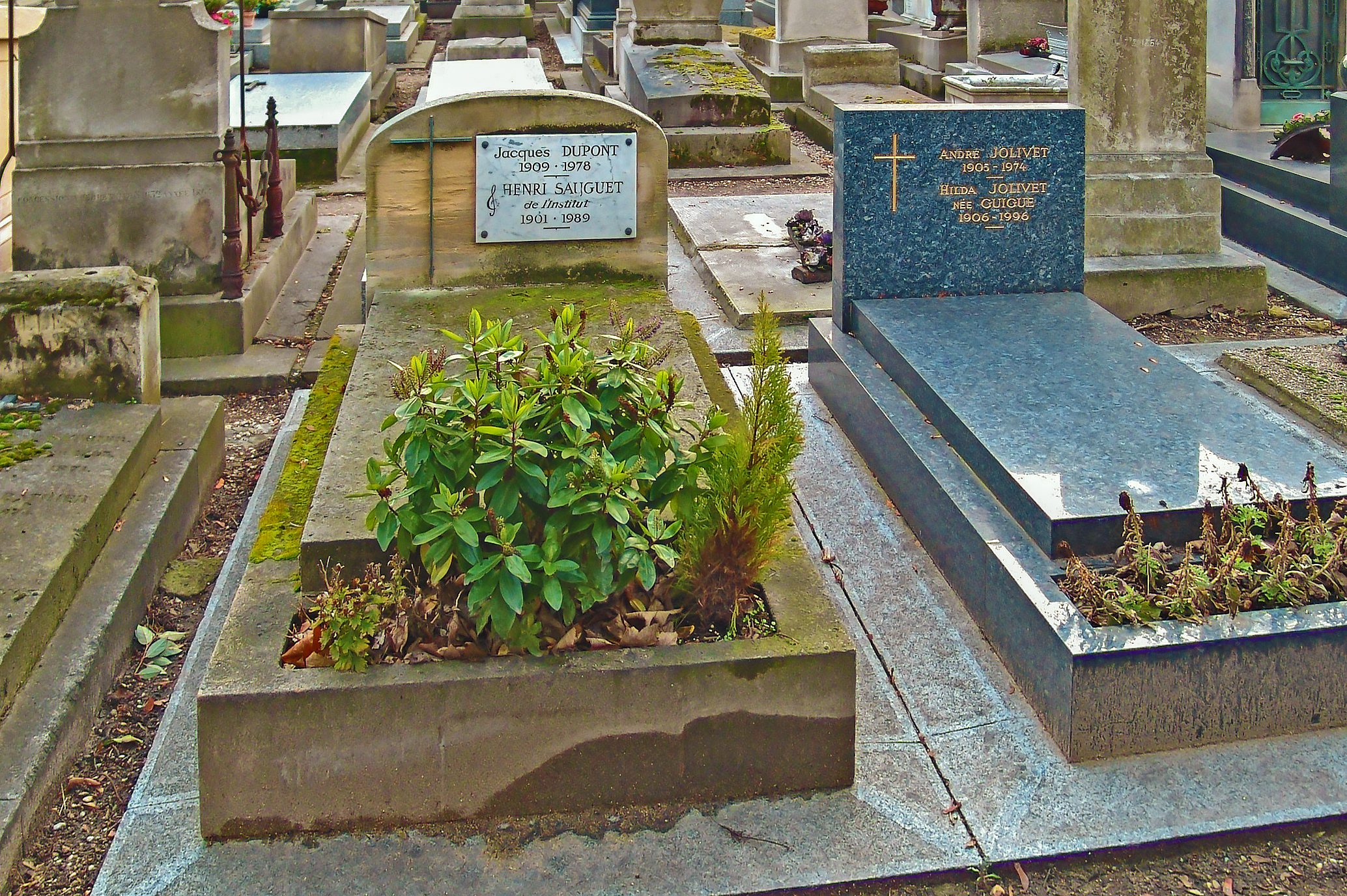
Sauguet's grave next to André Jolivet's

Sauguet worked as a music critic throughout the 1930s and 1940s. He founded the Composers Union, also devoting his time to Una Voce, an organization that works to preserve Latin and traditional chant in the Roman Catholic liturgy.

== Final years ==
In 1956 Sauguet was made an Officer of the Legion of Honour and succeeded his friend Milhaud into the French Academy in 1976.

Sauguet's personal partnership with a set designer and decorator of French theatre, Jacques Dupont, endured until the latter's death in 1978.

When Sauguet died in Paris in 1989, he was buried at the Montmartre Cemetery in the same grave as Dupont and next to that of André Jolivet in Section 27, near the grave of Hector Berlioz.

Sauguet's autobiography Musique, ma vie (Music, my life) was published posthumously in 1990.

== Selected recordings ==
- Les Forains and Tableaux de Paris - Toulouse Capitole Orchestra, Michel Plasson. His Master's Voice – C 069-16220
- Symphonies (complete) - Moscow Symphony Orchestra, Antonio de Almeida. Marco Polo (Naxos) - recorded 1994 and 1995
- Piano Concerto N° 1 in A minor - Vasso Devetzi (piano) - USSR Radio Orchestra, Gennady Rozhdestvensky & Les Forains - Lamoureux Orchestra, composer conducting. Le Chant Du Monde – LDX 78300
- Divertissement de Chambre - soloists directed by the composer; Lune inconstante - Suzanne Lafaye (soprano), Paul Derenne (tenor), Sauguet (piano); Les Animaux et Leurs Hommes - Suzanne Lafaye (soprano), Sauguet (piano); Neiges - Paul Derenne (tenor), Sauguet (piano). Disques André Charlin CCPE 2
- Les Caprices de Marianne - Andrée Esposito, Camille Maurane, Michel Sénéchal, Orchestre Radio-Lyrique, Manuel Rosenthal. Solstice SOCD 98/99 - recorded 1959
