= List of music students by teacher: G to J =

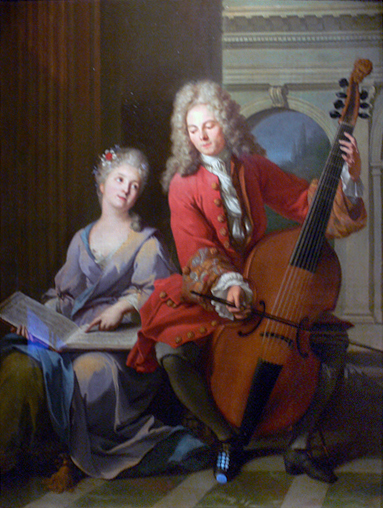

This is part of a list of students of music organized by teacher.

== G ==
=== Andrea Gabrieli ===
this teacher's teachers
Gabrieli (1532/1533 – 1585) studied with teachers including Orlande de Lassus.
- Giovanni Gabrieli [pupils]
- Hans Leo Hassler
- Lodovico Zacconi

=== Giovanni Gabrieli ===
this teacher's teachers
Gabrieli (c. 1554/1557 – 1612) studied with teachers including Andrea Gabrieli and Orlande de Lassus.
- Alessandro Grandi
- Heinrich Schütz [pupils]

=== Domenico Gabrielli ===
this teacher's teachers
Gabrielli (1651/1659 – 1690) studied with teachers including Petronio Franceschini, Giovanni Legrenzi, and Giacomo Antonio Perti.
- Giuseppe Maria Jacchini

=== Kenneth Gaburo ===
this teacher's teachers
Gaburo (1926–1993) studied with teachers including Howard Hanson.
- Jan Bach
- C. Curtis-Smith
- David Dunn
- Donald Erb [pupils]
- James Fulkerson
- Daniel Goode
- Peter Gordon
- Eleanor Hovda
- David Rosenboom [pupils]
- Allen Strange
- Ned Sublette
- James Tenney [pupils]

=== Henry Gadsby ===
this teacher's teachers
Gadsby (1842–1907) studied with teachers including William Bayley.
- Frederick Corder [pupils]
- Herman Finck
- Harold Osmond

=== Niels Gade ===
this teacher's teachers
Gade (1817–1890) studied with teachers including Frederik Thorkildsen Wexschall.
- Valborg Aulin
- Woldemar Bargiel [pupils]
- Louis Glass
- Edvard Grieg [pupils]
- Frits Hartvigson [pupils]
- Orla Rosenhoff [pupils]
- Cornelius Rübner
- August Winding

=== Tommaso Gaffi ===
this teacher's teachers
Gaffi (1667–1744) studied with teachers including Bernardo Pasquini.
- Andrea Basili

=== Ercole Gaibara ===
this teacher's teachers
Gaibara (1620–1690) studied with teachers including .
- Arcangelo Corelli [pupils]
- Bartolomeo Girolamo Laurenti
- Giuseppe Torelli [pupils](probably)

=== Hans Gál ===
this teacher's teachers
Gál (1890–1987) studied with teachers including Guido Adler, Eusebius Mandyczewski, and Richard Robert.
- Rudolf Schwarz [pupils]
- Fritz Spielmann [pupils]

=== Ivan Galamian ===
this teacher's teachers
Galamian (1903–1981) studied with teachers including Lucien Capet and Konstantin Mostras.
- David Cerone [pupils]
- Kyung-Wha Chung [pupils]
- Erick Friedman
- Vincent Frittelli [pupils]
- Fredell Lack
- Jaime Laredo
- Paul Makanowitzky
- David Montagu [pupils]
- Itzhak Perlman [pupils]
- Pinchas Zukerman
- Ellen Taaffe Zwilich

=== Paolo Gallico ===
- Frederick Jacobi [pupils]
- Zvi Keren
- Jerome Kern
- Elinor Remick Warren

=== Raymond Gallois-Montbrun ===
this teacher's teachers
Gallois-Montbrun (1918–1994) studied with teachers including Henri Büsser, Jean Gallon, Noël Gallon, and Firmin Touche.
- Akira Miyoshi [pupils]

=== Jean Gallon ===
this teacher's teachers
J. Gallon (1878–1959) studied with teachers including Albert Lavignac and Charles Lenepveu.
- Elsa Barraine
- Paul Bonneau
- Henri Challan [pupils]
- Georges Dandelot
- Jean-Yves Daniel-Lesur [pupils]
- Jeanne Demessieux
- Pierre Dervaux [pupils]
- Yvonne Desportes [pupils]
- Maurice Duruflé [pupils]
- Henri Dutilleux [pupils]
- Ulvi Cemal Erkin
- Raymond Gallois-Montbrun [pupils]
- Noël Gallon [pupils]
- Jean Hubeau
- Paule Maurice
- Olivier Messiaen [pupils]
- Jean Rivier [pupils]
- Pierre Sancan
- Paul Tortelier

=== Noël Gallon ===
this teacher's teachers
N. Gallon (1891–1966) studied with teachers including Georges Caussade, Jean Gallon, Albert Lavignac, Charles Lenepveu, Isidor Philipp, and Édouard Risler.
- Claude Arrieu
- Tony Aubin [pupils]
- Mansi Barberis
- Jocelyne Binet
- Gerd Boder
- Paul Bonneau
- Pierre Dervaux
- Yvonne Desportes [pupils]
- Maurice Duruflé
- Henri Dutilleux [pupils]
- Ulvi Cemal Erkin
- Lukas Foss [pupils]
- Raymond Gallois-Montbrun [pupils]
- Jean Hubeau
- Pedro Ipuche Riva
- Paul Kuentz
- Jean Langlais [pupils]
- Paule Maurice
- Olivier Messiaen [pupils]
- René Saorgin
- Ding Shande
- Michiko Toyama
- Xian Xinghai

=== Charles Henry Galloway ===
this teacher's teachers
Galloway (1871–1931) studied with teachers including Alexandre Guilmant and William Robyn.
- Allan Bacon
- Amy Upham Wood Bagg
- Lucien E. Becker
- George Cibulka
- Herbert Cohn
- Paul Freiss
- Hugo Hagen
- Rose Marie Hallam
- Mrs. Philip B. Hopkins
- Hunter Jones
- Oliver Henry Kleinschmidt
- Lucy Dimmitt Kolp
- Edna Bell Lieber
- Caroline May Lowe
- Edward E. Menges
- John Menown
- Leo C. Miller
- Walter D. Parker
- James Thomas Quarles
- O. Rauschelbach
- Ernest Prang Stamm
- Adolph Steuterman
- Harry E. von Tobel
- Henry Stanley Walser
- Walter Paul Wismar

=== Baldassare Galuppi ===
this teacher's teachers
Galuppi (1706–1785) studied with teachers including Antonio Lotti.
- Franz Ignaz Beck [pupils]
- Dmitry Bortniansky
- Andrea Luchesi [pupils]

=== Johann Baptist Gänsbacher ===
this teacher's teachers
Gänsbacher (1778–1844) studied with teachers including Georg Joseph Vogler.
- Josef Netzer
- Milka Ternina

=== Eugenie Garcia ===
- Marie Monbelli [pupils]

=== Gustave Garcia ===
- Béatrice La Palme

=== Manuel García, Jr. ===
this teacher's teachers
García (1805-1906) studied with teachers including François-Joseph Fétis.
- Jessie Bond
- Julia Ettie Crane
- Camille Everardi [pupils]
- Erminia Frezzolini
- Julius Günther
- Jenny Lind [pupils]
- Maria Malibran
- Mathilde Marchesi [pupils]
- Christina Nilsson
- Henriette Nissen-Saloman [pupils]
- Charles Santley
- Antoinette Sterling
- Julius Stockhausen [pupils]
- Marie Tempest
- Henry Wood [pupils]

=== Manuel García, Sr. ===
- Maria Malibran
- Pauline Viardot

=== Ramón Gargallo ===
- Joan Exequiel Fernández

=== Carlota Garriga ===
this teacher's teachers
Garriga (1937-) studied with teachers including Alicia de Larrocha and Frank Marshall.
- William Macclure II

=== Francesco Gasparini ===
this teacher's teachers
Gasparini (1661–1727) studied with teachers including Bernardo Pasquini.
- Benedetto Marcello
- Giovanni Porta
- Johann Joachim Quantz [pupils]
- Domenico Scarlatti

=== Bernard Gates ===
this teacher's teachers
Gates (1686–1773) studied with teachers including John Blow.
- Samuel Arnold
- James Nares [pupils]

=== Philippe Gaubert ===
this teacher's teachers
Gaubert (1879–1941) studied with teachers including Paul Taffanel, Xavier Leroux, and Charles Lenepveu.
- Tony Aubin [pupils]
- Roger Désormière [pupils]

=== Pierre Gaviniès ===
- Simon Le Duc [pupils]

=== Heinrich Gebhard ===
this teacher's teachers
Gebhard (1878–1963) studied with teachers including Theodor Leschetizky.
- Leonard Bernstein [pupils]
- Helen Coates [pupils]
- Peggy Stuart Coolidge
- Alan Hovhaness [pupils]

=== André Gedalge ===
this teacher's teachers
Gedalge (1856–1926) studied with teachers including Ernest Guiraud.
- Gina de Araújo
- Marion Bauer [pupils]
- André Bloch
- Nadia Boulanger [pupils]
- Claude Champagne [pupils]
- Claude Delvincourt [pupils]
- George Enescu [pupils]
- Gabriel Grovlez
- Arthur Honegger [pupils]
- Jacques Ibert
- Charles Koechlin [pupils]
- Paul Ladmirault
- Raoul Laparra
- Lazare Lévy [pupils]
- Darius Milhaud [pupils]
- Max d'Ollone
- Poldowski
- Henri Rabaud
- Maurice Ravel [pupils]
- Andree Rochat [pupils]
- Jean Roger-Ducasse
- Florent Schmitt
- Marthe Servine

=== Henry Geehl ===
- Philip Catelinet
- Pete Moore
- William Lovelock
- Eric Parkin
- Nicholas Temperley

=== Francesco Geminiani ===
this teacher's teachers
Geminiani (1687–1762) studied with teachers including Arcangelo Corelli and Alessandro Scarlatti.
- Charles Avison [pupils]
- Henry Carey
- Matthew Dubourg
- Michael Christian Festing
- Bernhard Joachim Hagen
- Cecilia Young

=== Harald Genzmer ===
this teacher's teachers
Genzmer (1909–2007) studied with teachers including Paul Hindemith.
- Gamal Abdel-Rahim
- Franco Evangelisti
- Bertold Hummel
- John McCabe

=== Friedrich Gernsheim ===
- Emil Bohnke
- Engelbert Humperdinck [pupils]
- Carl Lachmund
- Kurt Schindler
- Pancho Vladigerov [pupils]
- Ignatz Waghalter

=== Roberto Gerhard ===
this teacher's teachers
Gerhard (1896–1970) studied with teachers including Felip Pedrell and Arnold Schoenberg.
- Robert Ashley [pupils]
- Roger Reynolds [pupils]

=== Anton Gerke ===
this teacher's teachers
Gerke (1812–1870) studied with teachers including John Field, Friedrich Kalkbrenner, Ignaz Moscheles, and Ferdinand Ries.
- Modest Mussorgsky
- Nikolai Rimsky-Korsakov [pupils]

=== François-Auguste Gevaert ===
this teacher's teachers
Gevaert (1828–1908) studied with teachers including Martin-Joseph Mengal.
- Arthur De Greef [pupils]
- James Kwast [pupils]
- Karel Mestdagh
- Poldowski
- Edgar Tinel [pupils]
- Alfred Wotquenne

=== Giorgio Federico Ghedini ===
this teacher's teachers
Ghedini (1892–1965) studied with teachers including Marco Enrico Bossi.
- Claudio Abbado
- Marcello Abbado
- Luciano Berio [pupils]
- Guido Cantelli
- Fiorenzo Carpi
- Niccolò Castiglioni
- Barbara (Elena) Giuranna
- Carlo Pinelli

=== Vittorio Giannini ===
- David Amram
- Mark Bucci
- John Corigliano [pupils]
- Nancy Bloomer Deussen
- Nicolas Flagello
- Adolphus Hailstork
- Herbie Hancock
- Anthony Iannaccone
- M. William Karlins [pupils]
- Osvaldo Lacerda
- Thomas Pasatieri
- Alfred Reed
- Avraham Sternklar
- Irwin Swack

=== Reine Gianoli ===
- Malcolm Bilson

=== Christopher Gibbons ===
this teacher's teachers
Gibbons (1615–1676) studied with teachers including Edward Gibbons and Orlando Gibbons.
- John Blow [pupils]
- Pelham Humfrey [pupils]
- Henry Purcell [pupils]

=== Orlando Gibbons ===
this teacher's teachers
Gibbons (1583–1625) studied with teachers including .
- Christopher Gibbons [pupils]
- John Hingston [pupils]

=== Walter Gieseking ===
this teacher's teachers
Gieseking (1895–1956) studied with teachers including Karl Leimer.
- Mary Louise Boehm
- Albert Ferber
- Marian Filar
- Stewart L. Gordon
- Werner Haas
- Alfred Mouledous
- Yasuko Nakayama
- Hans Otte
- Peter Schmalfuss
- Sidney Sukoenig
- Ward Swingle
- Narciso Yepes

=== Eugène Gigout ===
this teacher's teachers
Gigout (1844–1925) studied with teachers including Camille Saint-Saëns.
- Léon Boëllmann
- Maurice Duruflé
- André Fleury
- Henri Gagnon
- André Marchal [pupils]
- André Messager
- Albert Roussel [pupils]
- Isabel Güell i López

=== Anthony Gilbert ===
this teacher's teachers
Gilbert (1934–2023) studied with teachers including Alexander Goehr, Denis Holloway, Anthony Milner, Gunther Schuller, and Mátyás Seiber.
- Sally Beamish
- Tim Benjamin
- Martin Butler
- Simon Holt [pupils]
- Adam Johnson
- Paul Newland
- Janet Owen Thomas
- Priti Paintal
- James Saunders
- Ian Vine

=== Georges Gillet ===
- Fernand Gillet
- Georges Longy
- Myrtile Morel
- Louis Speyer
- Marcel Tabuteau [pupils]

=== Alberto Ginastera ===
this teacher's teachers
Ginastera (1916–1983) studied with teachers including Aaron Copland.
- Rafael Aponte-Ledée
- Waldo de los Ríos
- Alcides Lanza [pupils]
- Jacqueline Nova
- Ástor Piazzolla
- Jacqueline Nova
- Iris Sanguesa
- Alicia Terzian
- Blás Emilio Atehortua

=== Leo Ginzburg ===
this teacher's teachers
Ginzburg (1901–1979) studied with teachers including Nikolai Golovanov, Nikolai Malko, and Konstantin Saradzhev.
- Alexander Anisimov
- Gennady Cherkasov
- Veronika Dudarova
- Leonid Grin
- Vladimir Fedoseyev
- Michail Jurowski
- Dmitri Kitayenko
- Nikolai Korndorf [pupils]
- Fuat Mansurov
- Vyacheslav Ovchinnikov
- Cao Peng
- Mstislav Rostropovich

=== Tommaso Giordani ===
- Thomas Simpson Cooke [pupils]
- John Field [pupils]
- Sydney, Lady Morgan

=== Narcisse Girard ===
this teacher's teachers
Girard (1797–1860) studied with teachers including Pierre Baillot and Anton Reicha.
- Édouard Colonne
- Jules Danbé
- Charles Lamoureux

=== Helen Glatz ===
this teacher's teachers
Glatz (1908–1996) studied with teachers including Ralph Vaughan Williams and Gordon Jacob.
- Lindsay Cooper
- Philip Sawyers
- Rosamund Strode
- John Wellingham

=== Alexander Glazunov ===
this teacher's teachers
Glazunov (1865–1936) studied with teachers including Nikolai Rimsky-Korsakov.
- Heino Eller [pupils]
- Leonid Kreutzer [pupils]
- Nikolai Malko [pupils]
- Witold Maliszewski [pupils]
- Nathan Milstein
- Sergei Prokofiev
- Vladimir Alexievitch Seniloff
- Dmitri Shostakovich [pupils]
- Maximilian Steinberg [pupils]
- Alexander Sverjensky [pupils]
- Dimitri Tiomkin

=== Frederick Grant Gleason ===
- Elsa Swartz
- Mortimer Wilson

=== Reinhold Glière ===
this teacher's teachers
Glière (1875–1956) studied with teachers including Anton Arensky, Georgi Conus, Jan Hřímalý, Mikhail Ippolitov-Ivanov, and Sergei Taneyev.
- Boris Alexandrovich Alexandrov
- Vernon Duke
- Aram Khachaturian [pupils]
- Lev Knipper
- Boris Lyatoshinsky
- Alexander Mosolov
- Nikolai Myaskovsky [pupils]
- Sergei Prokofiev
- Nikolai Rakov [pupils]
- Levko Revutsky

=== Mikhail Glinka ===
this teacher's teachers
Glinka (1804–1857) studied with teachers including Siegfried Dehn and Charles Mayer.
- Alexander Dargomyzhsky

=== Christoph Willibald Gluck ===
this teacher's teachers
Gluck (1714–1787) studied with teachers including Giovanni Battista Sammartini.
- Marie Antoinette
- Florian Leopold Gassmann [pupils]
- Antonio Salieri [pupils]

=== Walter Gmeindl ===
- Klaus Egge

=== Benjamin Godard ===
this teacher's teachers
Godard (1849-1895) studied with teachers including Henri Vieuxtemps and Napoléon Henri Reber.
- Valborg Aulin
- Cécile Chaminade

=== John Godfrey ===
- Ann Cleare

=== Alexander Goehr ===
this teacher's teachers
Goehr (born 1932) studied with teachers including Richard Hall, Olivier Messiaen, Humphrey Procter-Gregg, and Arnold Schoenberg.

Composers

- Thomas Adès
- Julian Anderson [pupils]
- George Benjamin
- Chen Yi
- Francesco Cilluffo
- Marc-Antonio Consoli
- Edward Cowie
- David Froom
- Anthony Gilbert [pupils]
- Nicolas Hodges [pupils]
- Robin Holloway [pupils]
- Nicola LeFanu [pupils]
- Silvina Milstein
- Bayan Northcott
- Geoffrey Poole
- Nick Sackman
- Daria Semegen [pupils]
- Roger Smalley
- Jeremy Thurlow
- Jack Van Zandt
- Ye Xiaogang
- Zhou Long

Musicologists

- Nicholas Cook
- Nicholas Williams

=== Walter Goehr ===
this teacher's teachers
Goehr (1903–1960) studied with teachers including Arnold Schoenberg.
- John Carewe [pupils]

=== Percy Goetschius ===
- Pauline Alderman
- Ulric Cole
- Henry Cowell [pupils]
- Lillian Fuchs
- Samuel Gardner
- Howard Hanson [pupils]
- Swan Hennessy
- Eva Jessye
- Arthur Loesser
- Daniel Gregory Mason
- Leo Ornstein
- Wallingford Riegger [pupils]
- Richard Rodgers
- Bernard Rogers [pupils]
- Arthur Shepherd
- Milton Suskind

=== Johann Gottlieb Goldberg ===
this teacher's teachers
Goldberg (1727–1756) studied with teachers including Johann Sebastian Bach.
- Gottlieb Friedrich Müller [pupils]

=== Aleksandr Goldenweiser ===
this teacher's teachers
Goldenweiser (1875–1961) studied with teachers including Vassily Safonoff, Sergei Taneyev, and Nikolai Zverev.
- Nelly Akopian-Tamarina
- Sulamita Aronovsky
- Dmitri Bashkirov
- Lazar Berman
- Alexander Braginsky
- Galina Eguiazarova
- Roza Eidus
- Samuil Feinberg
- Grigory Ginzburg
- Dmitry Kabalevsky [pupils]
- Nikolai Kapustin
- Tatiana Nikolayeva [pupils]
- Dmitry Paperno
- Nikolai Arnoldovich Petrov
- Rosa Tamarkina
- Oxana Yablonskaya

=== Friedrich Goldmann ===
this teacher's teachers
Goldmann (1941–2009) studied with teachers including Karlheinz Stockhausen.
- Paul Frick (of Brandt Brauer Frick)
- Arnulf Herrmann
- Chatschatur Kanajan
- Sergej Newski
- Helmut Oehring
- Enno Poppe
- Nicolaus Richter de Vroe
- Steffen Schleiermacher
- Charlotte Seither
- Jakob Ullmann
- H. Johannes Wallmann

=== Rubin Goldmark ===
this teacher's teachers
Goldmark (1872–1936) studied with teachers including Antonín Dvořák and Johann Nepomuk Fuchs.
- Mark Brunswick
- Aaron Copland [pupils]
- George Gershwin
- Alexei Haieff
- Frederick Jacobi [pupils]
- Philip James
- Paul Nordoff [pupils]

=== Boris Goldovsky ===
this teacher's teachers
Goldovsky (1908–2001) studied with teachers including Ernő Dohnányi and Artur Schnabel.
- Sarah Caldwell
- Phyllis Curtin
- Rosalind Elias
- Peter Feldman
- Robert McFerrin
- Sherrill Milnes
- Jane Stuart Smith
- Margareta Backer Sunnegårdh
- Elizabeth Pastor [pupils]
- Richard Rosenberg

=== Robert Goldsand ===
this teacher's teachers
Goldsand (1911-1991) studied with teachers including Joseph Marx, Emil von Sauer, and Moriz Rosenthal.
- Suezenne Fordham
- Neil Galanter
- Harris Goldsmith [pupils]
- Anne Koscielny
- Paul Rutman
- Thomas Schumacher
- Ralph Votapek

=== Harris Goldsmith ===
this teacher's teachers
Goldsmith (1935-2014) studied with teachers including Robert Goldsand.
- Cecile Licad
- Jenny Lin

=== Nikolai Golovanov ===
this teacher's teachers
Golovanov (1891–1953) studied with teachers including Alexander Ilyinsky, Mikhail Ippolitov-Ivanov, Alexander Kastalsky, Vasily Orlov, and Sergei Vasilenko.
- Leo Ginzburg [pupils]

=== Katharine Goodson ===
this teacher's teachers
Goodson (1872–1958) studied with teachers including Theodor Leschetizky.
- Clifford Curzon [pupils]

=== Léon Goossens ===
this teacher's teachers
Goossens (1897–1988) studied with teachers including Charles Reynolds.
- Evelyn Barbirolli
- Joy Boughton
- Natalie Caine
- Peter Graeme
- Terence MacDonagh [pupils]

=== Adam Gorb ===
this teacher's teachers
Gorb (b. 1958) studied with teachers including Robin Holloway, Paul Patterson, and Hugh Wood.
- Cecilia McDowall

=== Henryk Górecki ===
this teacher's teachers
Górecki (1933–2010) studied with teachers including Bolesław Szabelski.
- Eugeniusz Knapik
- Andrzej Krzanowski

=== Sascha Gorodnitzki ===
this teacher's teachers
Gorodnitzki (1904-1986) studied with teachers including Rubin Goldmark, Percy Goetschius and Josef Lhévinne .
- Janina Fialkowska
- Constance Geanakoplos
- Craig Sheppard
- Eduardus Halim
- Sophia Agranovich
- Joseph Villa
- Garrick Ohlsson
- Fei-Ping Hsu
- David Syme
- Jack Winerock
- Şahan Arzruni
- Manfred Clynes
- Michael Korstick
- Mari Kumamoto
- Hai-Kyung Suh
- Stephen Portman
- Lois Towles
- Armenta Adams
- Angela Cheng
- Erik Thomas Tawaststjerna
- André Laplante
- Stephen Masi
- Abbott Lee Ruskin
- Steve Mayer
- Albert Lotto
- Myoko Lotto
- Gisela Richter [pupils]
- Emmet Vokes [pupils]
- Herbert Rogers
- Dennis Russell Davies
- Eugene Istomin
- Nelita True
- Lars Roos
- Paul Rutman

=== John Goss ===
this teacher's teachers
Goss (1800–1880) studied with teachers including Thomas Attwood.
- Frederick Bridge [pupils]
- Frederick Scotson Clark [pupils]
- Frederic Cowen
- Florence Ashton Marshall
- Arthur Sullivan [pupils]

=== François-Joseph Gossec ===
this teacher's teachers
Gossec (1734–1829) studied with teachers including Jean-Philippe Rameau.
- Charles Simon Catel [pupils]
- Bernhard Crusell
- Victor Dourlen [pupils]
- Jean-Henri Simon [pupils]

=== Louis Moreau Gottschalk ===
this teacher's teachers
Gottschalk (1829–1869) studied with teachers including Charles Hallé, Pierre Maleden, and Camille-Marie Stamaty.
- Teresa Carreño [pupils]
- Ignacio Cervantes [pupils]

=== Charles Gounod ===
this teacher's teachers
Gounod (1818–1893) studied with teachers including Henri-Montan Berton, Fromental Halévy, Jean-François Le Sueur, Felix Mendelssohn, Anton Reicha, and Pierre-Joseph-Guillaume Zimmerman.
- Georges Bizet
- Reynaldo Hahn [pupils]
- Spyridon Samaras

=== N. Govindarajan ===
- Michael Tenzer [pupils]

=== Hermann Grabner ===
this teacher's teachers
Grabner (1886–1969) studied with teachers including Max Reger, Hans Sitt, and Leopold Suchsland.
- Wolfgang Fortner [pupils]
- Helen Tobias-Duesberg

=== Hermann Graedener ===
- Józef Koffler
- Clemens Krauss [pupils]
- Robert Winterberg

=== Joseph Graetz ===
- Caspar Ett
- Josepha von Fladt [pupils]
- Johann Nepomuk Kalcher
- Peter Josef von Lindpaintner
- Eduard Rottmanner

=== Guillermo Graetzer ===
this teacher's teachers
Graetzer (1914–1993) studied with teachers including Paul Hindemith.
- Mario Davidovsky [pupils]
- Fernando Egozcue
- Mariano Etkin
- Carlos Grätzer
- Marcelo Koc
- Marcelo Nisinman

=== Gary Graffman ===
this teacher's teachers
Graffman (1928-) studied with teachers including Rudolf Serkin and Vladimir Horowitz.
- Lydia Artymiw
- Lang Lang
- Yuja Wang
- Haochen Zhang

=== Percy Grainger ===
this teacher's teachers
Grainger (1882–1961) studied with teachers including Ferruccio Busoni, Karl Klimsch, Iwan Knorr, and James Kwast.
- Gordon Bryan
- Bernard Herrmann

=== Enrique Granados ===
this teacher's teachers
Granados (1867-1916 studied with teachers including Felip Pedrell, Joan Baptista Pujol, and Charles-Wilfrid de Bériot.
- Narcisa Freixas
- Rosa García Ascot
- Roberto Gerhard
- Francesca Madriguera i Rodon
- Frank Marshall [pupils]
- Concepció Badia i Millàs
- Mercedes Moner Raguer

=== Giuseppina Grassini ===
- Giuditta Grisi
- Giulia Grisi
- Giuditta Pasta

=== Johann Gottlieb Graun ===
this teacher's teachers
Graun (1703–1771) studied with teachers including Johann Georg Pisendel and Giuseppe Tartini.
- Wilhelm Friedemann Bach [pupils]
- Balthasar Christian Bertram [pupils]

=== Thomas Greatorex ===
this teacher's teachers
Greatorex (1758–1831) studied with teachers including Benjamin Cooke.
- Henry Hugo Pierson [pupils]

=== Gaetano Greco ===
this teacher's teachers
Greco (ca. 1657 – ca. 1728) studied with teachers including Giovanni Salvatore and Gennaro Ursino.
- Giovanni Battista Pergolesi
- Nicola Porpora [pupils]
- Leonardo Vinci

=== Kyla Greenbaum ===
this teacher's teachers
Greenbaum (1922–2017) studied with teachers including László Lajtha.
- Cornelius Cardew [pupils]

=== Maurice Greene ===
this teacher's teachers
Greene (1696–1755) studied with teachers including Richard Brind and William Croft.
- William Boyce [pupils]
- James Nares [pupils]
- John Stanley [pupils]

=== André Grétry ===
this teacher's teachers
Grétry (1741 – 1813) studied with teachers including Henri Moreau, Giovanni Battista Casali, and Giovanni Battista Martini .
- Nicolas Dalayrac
- Joseph-Denis Doche

=== Edvard Grieg ===
this teacher's teachers
Grieg (1843–1907) studied with teachers including Niels Gade, Salomon Jadassohn, Ignaz Moscheles, Robert Papperitz, Louis Plaidy, and Carl Reinecke.
- Frank Van der Stucken

=== Jessie Grimson ===
this teacher's teachers
Grimson studied with teachers including August Wilhelmj and Henry Holmes.

- Marjorie Hayward [pupils]
- Nona Liddell [pupils]

=== Gérard Grisey ===
this teacher's teachers
Grisey (1946–1998) studied with teachers including Henri Dutilleux, Olivier Messiaen, and Karlheinz Stockhausen.
- Mark Andre
- Roberto Andreoni
- Jörn Arnecke
- Franck Bedrossian
- Pietro Borradori
- Régis Campo
- Edmund Campion
- Pascale Criton
- Stéphane de Gérando
- Henrik Hellstenius
- Atli Ingólfsson
- Javier Jacinto
- Edward Jacobs
- Ramon Lazkano
- Fabien Lévy
- Magnus Lindberg
- Éric Morin
- Arturo Rodas
- Steingrimur Rohloff
- Fausto Romitelli
- Michael Tenzer [pupils]
- Erling Wold
- Xu Yi
- Evan Ziporyn

=== Ernst Gröschel ===
this teacher's teachers
Gröschel (1918–2000) studied with teachers including Emil von Sauer.
- Thomas Fink
- Zimmermann Walter

=== Stefans Grové ===
this teacher's teachers
Grové (1922–2014) studied with teachers including Aaron Copland, William Henry Bell, Erik Chisholm, Thurston Dart, and Walter Piston.
- Sergio Cervetti [pupils]

=== Gabriel Grovlez ===
this teacher's teachers
Grovlez (1879–1944) studied with teachers including Gabriel Fauré.
- Luís de Freitas Branco

=== Georg Wilhelm Gruber ===
- Johann Christoph Vogel

=== Jakob Grün ===
this teacher's teachers
Grün (1837–1916) studied with teachers including Joseph Böhm.
- Oskar Back [pupils]
- Rudolf Fitzner
- Carl Flesch [pupils]
- Franz Kneisel
- Luigi von Kunits
- Adolf Rebner
- Petar Stojanović
- Hans Wessely [pupils]

=== Friedrich Grützmacher ===
this teacher's teachers
Grützmacher (1832–1903) studied with teachers including Karl Drexler.
- Hugo Becker
- Wilhelm Fitzenhagen
- Leopold Suchsland [pupils]

=== Gaetano Guadagni ===
- Caterina Gabrielli

=== Gioseffo Guami ===
- Adriano Banchieri

=== Pelle Gudmundsen-Holmgreen ===
this teacher's teachers
Gudmundsen-Holmgreen (1932–2016) studied with teachers including Bjørn Hjelmborg, Finn Høffding, Vagn Holmboe, and Svend Westergaard.
- Hans Abrahamsen [pupils]

=== Paul Guérin ===
this teacher's teachers
Guérin (1799–1872) studied with teachers including Pierre Baillot.
- Charles Dancla [pupils]
- Jules Piédeleu

=== Alberto Guerrero ===
- Glenn Gould [pupils]
- Domingo Santa Cruz [pupils]

=== Francisco Guerrero ===
- Alonso Lobo [pupils]

=== Pedro Guerrero ===
- Francisco Guerrero

=== Alexandre Guilmant ===
this teacher's teachers
Guilmant (1837–1911) studied with teachers including Jacques-Nicolas Lemmens.
- Augustin Barié
- Joseph-Arthur Bernier
- Seth Bingham
- Joseph Bonnet
- Edward Morris Bowman
- Alexandre Eugène Cellier
- Abel Decaux
- Gabriel Dupont
- Marcel Dupré [pupils]
- Charles Henry Galloway
- Philip Hale
- Edgar Henrichsen
- Édouard Mignan
- Émile Poillot [pupils]

=== Ernest Guiraud ===
this teacher's teachers
Guiraud (1837–1892) studied with teachers including Antoine François Marmontel.
- André Bloch
- Mélanie Bonis
- Henri Büsser [pupils]
- Claude Debussy [pupils]
- Paul Dukas [pupils]
- Maurice Emmanuel [pupils]
- Achille Fortier
- André Gedalge [pupils]
- Halina Krzyżanowska [pupils]
- Jules Massenet [pupils]
- Erik Satie
- Alice Sauvrezis

=== Friedrich Gulda ===
- Martha Argerich

=== Eugen Gura ===
- Charles W. Clark [pupils]

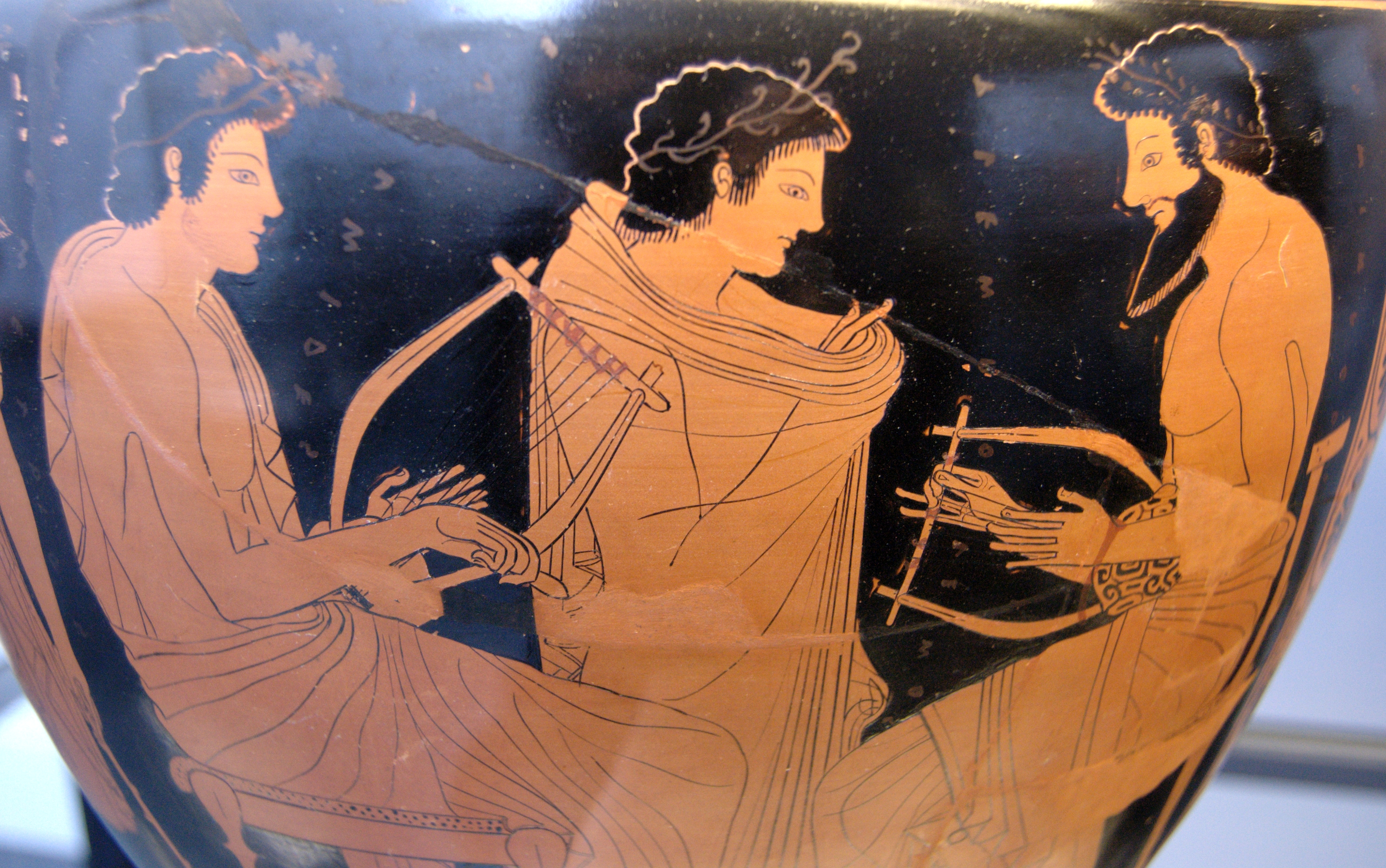

== H ==
=== Alois Hába ===
this teacher's teachers
Hába (1893–1973) studied with teachers including Vítězslav Novák, Franz Schreker, and Richard Stöhr.
- Slavko Osterc

=== François Habeneck ===
this teacher's teachers
Habeneck (1781–1849) studied with teachers including Pierre Baillot.
- Jean-Delphin Alard [pupils]
- César Franck [pupils]
- Édouard Lalo
- Hubert Léonard [pupils]
- Jean-Pierre Maurin [pupils]
- François Prume [pupils]
- Waldemar Thrane

=== Franz Habermann ===
- František Xaver Dušek [pupils]
- Josef Mysliveček [pupils]

=== Parashkev Hadjiev ===
- Dora Draganova

=== Howard Hadley ===
this teacher's teachers
Hadley studied with teachers including Frederic Cliffe and W. S. Rockstro.
- Miriam Hyde

=== Patrick Hadley ===
this teacher's teachers
Hadley studied with teachers including Cyril Rootham and Charles Wood.
- Denis ApIvor
- Brian Boydell
- Stephen Dodgson
- Rose Goldblatt
- William Lewarne Harris
- Ian Kemp
- Richard Hey Lloyd
- Stephen Wilkinson

=== Johann Christian Friedrich Hæffner ===
this teacher's teachers
Hæffner (1759–1833) studied with teachers including Johann Gottfried Vierling and Johann Adam Hiller.
- Adolf Fredrik Lindblad [pupils]
- Johan Erik Nordblom [pupils]

=== Ida Haendel ===
- David Garrett

=== Charles Hague ===
this teacher's teachers
Hague (1769–1821) studied with teachers including Benjamin Cooke, Pieter Hellendaal, Antony Manini, and Johann Peter Salomon.
- William Crotch [pupils]

=== Georg Joachim Joseph Hahn ===
this teacher's teachers
G. Hahn (1712–1772) studied with teachers including .
- Pater Alexius Molitor

=== Reynaldo Hahn ===
this teacher's teachers
R. Hahn (1874–1947) studied with teachers including Émile Decombes, Théodore Dubois, Charles Gounod, Albert Lavignac, Jules Massenet, and Camille Saint-Saëns.
- Luis Pacheco de Céspedes

=== Andre Hajdu ===
this teacher's teachers
Hajdu (1932–2016) studied with teachers including Zoltan Kodaly, Olivier Messiaen, and Darius Milhaud.
- Chaya Czernowin [pupils]
- Mátti Kovler
- Matan Porat
- Aharon Razel
- Yonatan Razel
- Yoni Rechter
- Gil Shohat

=== Laszlo Halasz ===
this teacher's teachers
Halasz (1905–2001) studied with teachers including Béla Bartók, Ernst von Dohnányi, Zoltan Kodály, and Leó Weiner.
- Sergio Cervetti

=== Fromental Halévy ===
this teacher's teachers
Halévy (1799–1862) studied with teachers including Henri-Montan Berton, Luigi Cherubini, and Étienne Méhul.
- François Bazin [pupils]
- Georges Bizet [pupils]
- Charles Dancla [pupils]
- Charles Delioux [pupils]
- Charles Gounod [pupils]
- Charles Lecocq
- Antoine François Marmontel [pupils]
- Victor Massé [pupils]
- Théodore Mozin [pupils]
- Joseph O'Kelly [pupils]
- Marguerite Samuel [pupils]

=== Rodolfo Halffter ===
- Mario Lavista [pupils]

=== Karel Halíř ===
this teacher's teachers
Halíř (1859–1909) studied with teachers including Joseph Joachim.
- Theodore Holland [pupils]
- Paul von Klenau
- David Mannes

=== Richard Hall ===
this teacher's teachers
Hall (1903–1982) studied with teachers including Edward Bairstow.
- Richard Rodney Bennett [pupils]
- Harrison Birtwistle [pupils]
- Arthur Butterworth [pupils]
- Peter Maxwell Davies [pupils]
- Alexander Goehr [pupils]
- Elgar Howarth
- Norman Kay
- John Ogdon
- Ronald Stevenson
- David Wilde

=== Gene Von Hallberg ===
this teacher's teachers
Von Hallberg (b. 1906) studied with teachers including unknown .
- Eugene Ettore
- John Serry Sr. [pupils]

=== Charles Hallé ===
this teacher's teachers
Hallé (1819–1895) studied with teachers including Christian Heinrich Rinck and Anton Halm.
- Marian Arkwright
- Louis Moreau Gottschalk [pupils]
- Madeline Schiller

=== Anton Halm ===
- Julius Epstein [pupils]
- Joseph Fischhof
- Stephen Heller [pupils]
- Adolf von Henselt [pupils]
- Anton Rée [pupils]

=== Bengt Hambraeus ===
- Peter Allen
- Barbara Monk Feldman
- Richard Hunt

=== Michael Hambourg ===
this teacher's teachers
Hambourg (1855–1916) studied with teachers including Nikolai Rubinstein.
- Clement Hambourg
- Mark Hambourg
- Gerald Moore
- Poldowski

=== Eero Hämeenniemi ===
- Juho Kangas
- Outi Tarkiainen
- Patrik Vidjeskog

=== Iain Hamilton ===
this teacher's teachers
Hamilton (1922–2000) studied with teachers including William Alwyn.
- Hugh Wood [pupils]

=== James Alexander Hamilton ===
this teacher's teachers
Hamilton (1785–1845) studied with teachers including unknown .
- Elizabeth Stirling [pupils]

=== Anton Joseph Hampel ===
- Giovanni Punto (Jan Václav Stich)

=== George Frideric Handel ===
this teacher's teachers
1663-1712 studied with teachers including Friedrich Wilhelm Zachow.
- John Stanley

=== J. N. Hanff ===
- Johann Mattheson

=== Ilmari Hannikainen ===
- Joonas Kokkonen

=== Wilhelm Hanser ===
- Étienne Méhul [pupils]

=== Howard Hanson ===
this teacher's teachers
Hanson studied with teachers including Percy Goetschius and Arne Oldberg.
- Dominick Argento [pupils]
- Jack Beeson [pupils]
- Frank Bencriscutto
- William Bergsma [pupils]
- David Borden
- John Davison
- Emma Lou Diemer [pupils]
- Kenneth Gaburo [pupils]
- Manuel Herrarte
- Joseph Willcox Jenkins
- Samuel Jones
- Homer Keller [pupils]
- John La Montaine [pupils]
- Martin Mailman
- Peter Mennin [pupils]
- Louis Mennini
- Ron Nelson
- Robert Moffat Palmer [pupils]
- Burrill Phillips [pupils]
- Alice Procter [pupils]
- Bill Pursell
- Gardner Read [pupils]
- H. Owen Reed
- Gloria Wilson Swisher
- John Weinzweig [pupils]
- John White

=== Raymond Hanson ===
- Barry Conyngham

=== John Harbison ===
this teacher's teachers
Harbison studied with teachers including Walter Piston and Roger Sessions.
- Koji Nakano
- Robert Paterson

=== Roy Harris ===
this teacher's teachers
Harris studied with teachers including Nadia Boulanger and Arthur Farwell.
- Lorne Betts
- George Lynn
- Charles Mills
- Robert Moffat Palmer [pupils]
- H. Owen Reed
- John Donald Robb
- Peter Schickele
- William Schuman [pupils]
- Diane Thome [pupils]
- Robert Turner
- John Verrall [pupils]

=== William Henry Harris ===
this teacher's teachers
Harris (1883–1973) studied with teachers including Walford Davies, Walter Parratt, and Charles Wood.
- Claud Peter Primrose Burton

=== Julius Harrison ===
this teacher's teachers
Harrison (1885–1963) studied with teachers including Granville Bantock.
- Peter Crossley-Holland
- Elizabeth Poston
- Humphrey Procter-Gregg [pupils]
- Charles Proctor

=== Lou Harrison ===
this teacher's teachers
Harrison studied with teachers including Henry Cowell, K. P. H. Notoprojo, and Arnold Schoenberg.
- Barbara Golden
- David Lang
- Gino Robair

=== Sidney Harrison ===
this teacher's teachers
Harrison (1903–1986) studied with teachers including Francesco Berger and Orlando Morgan.
- Leon Conrad
- Norma Fisher
- William Goodchild
- Carola Grindea
- John Lill [pupils]
- George Martin
- Malcolm Troup

=== Margaret Harshaw ===
this teacher's teachers
Harshaw (1909–1997) studied with teachers including Anna Eugénie Schoen-René.
- Laura Aikin
- William Burden
- Shirley Close
- Vinson Cole
- Jane Dutton
- Julia Faulkner
- Joseph Frank
- Colenton Freeman
- Franz Grundheber
- Cynthia Hoffmann [pupils]
- Kevin Langan
- Emily Magee
- Nancy Maultsby
- William McGraw
- Matthew Polenzani
- Laura Brooks Rice
- Nadine Secunde
- Christopher Shauldenbrand
- Alma Jean Smith
- Sharon Sweet
- Michael Sylvester
- Benita Valente
- Christine Weidinger
- Sally Wolf

=== Johan Peter Emilius Hartmann ===
- Cornelius Rübner
- Erik Anton Valdemar Siboni

=== Frits Hartvigson ===
this teacher's teachers
Hartvigson (1841–1919) studied with teachers including Niels Gade, Johan Christian Gebauer, Anton Rée, and Hans von Bülow.
- Constance Bache
- Pauline Ellice
- Alfred Hollins [pupils]
- William Murdoch
- George Thalben-Ball

=== Jonathan Harvey ===
this teacher's teachers
Harvey studied with teachers including Milton Babbitt.
- Evelyn Ficarra
- Christopher Fox
- Dominic Muldowney
- John Palmer

=== Kunihiko Hashimoto ===
this teacher's teachers
Hashimoto (1904–1949) studied with teachers including Arnold Schoenberg and Egon Wellesz.
- Yasushi Akutagawa
- Ikuma Dan
- Toshiro Mayuzumi
- Akio Yashiro [pupils]

=== Johann Adolph Hasse ===
this teacher's teachers
Hasse (baptised 1699 – 1783) studied with teachers including Alessandro Scarlatti, Nicola Porpora, and Johann Theile.
- Duchess Maria Antonia of Bavaria
- Johann Friedrich Agricola
- Marianna Martines
- Johann Gottlieb Naumann [pupils]
- Antonio Salieri [pupils]
- Johann Gottfried Schwanberg

=== Alphonse Hasselmans ===
- Marcel Grandjany [pupils]
- Pierre Jamet [pupils]
- Lily Laskine [pupils]
- Henriette Renié
- Gertrude Ina Robinson [pupils]
- Carlos Salzedo [pupils]
- Marcel Tournier [pupils]

=== Roman Haubenstock-Ramati ===
this teacher's teachers
Haubenstock-Ramati (1919–1994) studied with teachers including Artur Malawski and Józef Koffler.
- Beat Furrer [pupils]

=== Josef Matthias Hauer ===
- Friedrich Cerha
- Rene Clemencic
- Nikolaus Feodoroff
- Ferdinand Grossmann
- Hermann Heiss
- Arnold Keyserling
- Paul von Klenau
- Gerhard Rühm
- Heinrich Simbriger
- Victor Sokolowski
- Othmar Steinbauer
- Johann Ludwig Trepulka
- David Tudor

=== Carl August Haupt ===
this teacher's teachers
Haupt (1810–1891) studied with teachers including August Wilhelm Bach.
- Edward Morris Bowman
- Edward Fisher
- Arnold Mendelssohn
- Wilhelm Middelschulte [pupils]
- John Knowles Paine [pupils]
- Georg Riemenschneider
- James Hotchkiss Rogers [pupils]
- Gerrit Smith
- Whitney Eugene Thayer
- George Whiting

=== Moritz Hauptmann ===
this teacher's teachers
Hauptmann (1792–1868) studied with teachers including Francesco Morlacchi and Louis Spohr.
- Horton Claridge Allison
- Mikhail Azanchevsky
- Friedrich Baumfelder
- Ferdinand Böhme [pupils]
- Johann Friedrich Franz Burgmüller
- Hans von Bülow [pupils]
- Frederic Cowen
- Edward Dannreuther [pupils]
- Ferdinand David [pupils]
- Karl Davydov [pupils]
- Felix Otto Dessoff [pupils]
- John Farmer [pupils]
- Otto Goldschmidt
- Charles Edward Horsley
- Salomon Jadassohn [pupils]
- Joseph Joachim [pupils]
- Friedrich Kiel [pupils]
- William Mason [pupils]
- Karl Ernst Naumann
- Arthur O'Leary [pupils]
- Robert Papperitz [pupils]
- James Cutler Dunn Parker
- Oscar Paul [pupils]
- Karl Perfall
- Hubert Ries
- Wilhelm Albert Rischbieter
- Jean F. Schucht
- Isidor Seiss [pupils]
- Erik Anton Valdemar Siboni
- Arthur Sullivan [pupils]
- Franklin Taylor [pupils]
- Max Vogrich
- Carl Friedrich Weitzmann [pupils]
- August Wilhelmj [pupils]
- Hermann Adolf Wollenhaupt
- Bruno Zwintscher

=== Robert Hausmann ===
- Friedrich Koch [pupils]
- Wallingford Riegger [pupils]
- Philipp Roth
- Percy Such

=== William Hawes ===
this teacher's teachers
Hawes (1785–1846) studied with teachers including Edmund Ayrton.
- Edward John Hopkins [pupils]
- Samuel Sebastian Wesley

=== Fumio Hayasaka ===
- Masaru Sato
- Toru Takemitsu [pupils]

=== Battison Haynes ===
this teacher's teachers
Haynes (1859–1900) studied with teachers including Salomon Jadassohn, Ebenezer Prout, Franklin Taylor, and Carl Reinecke.
- Harry Farjeon
- Charles Macpherson
- Percy Hilder Miles
- Robert Radford

=== Joseph Haydn ===
this teacher's teachers
Haydn (1732–1809) studied with teachers including Nicola Porpora.
- Marianna Auenbrugger
- Ludwig van Beethoven [pupils]
- George Bridgetower
- Thomas Haigh
- Peter Hänsel
- Michael Haydn [pupils]
- Jean-Baptiste Krumpholz
- Franciszek Lessel [pupils]
- Marianna Martines
- Sigismund von Neukomm [pupils]
- Franz Nikolaus Novotny
- Ignaz Pleyel
- Rebecca Schroeter
- Anton Wranitzky

=== Michael Haydn ===
this teacher's teachers
Haydn (1737–1806) studied with teachers including Joseph Haydn.
- Ignaz Assmayer
- Anton Diabelli
- Benedikt Hacker
- Sigismund von Neukomm [pupils]
- Carl Maria von Weber [pupils]
- Joseph Woelfl [pupils]

=== Hugo Heermann ===
this teacher's teachers
Heermann (1844–1935) studied with teachers including Lambert Joseph Meerts.
- Lucien Durosoir
- Maxim Jacobsen
- Hermann Hans Wetzler [pupils]

=== Bernhard Heiden ===
this teacher's teachers
Heiden studied with teachers including Paul Hindemith and Robert Moffat Palmer.
- Donald Erb [pupils]
- Frederick A. Fox [pupils]

=== Jascha Heifetz ===
this teacher's teachers
Heifetz (1901–1987) studied with teachers including Leopold Auer.
- Ayke Agus
- Pierre Amoyal
- Eugene Fodor
- Erick Friedman
- Endre Granat
- Rudolf Koelman
- Paul Rosenthal
- Ilkka Talvi
- Yukiko Kamei-Kurakata

=== Johann David Heinichen ===
this teacher's teachers
Heinichen studied with teachers including Johann Kuhnau and Johann Schelle.
- Johann Georg Pisendel [pupils]

=== Paavo Heininen ===
- Jouni Kaipainen
- Magnus Lindberg
- Veli-Matti Puumala
- Kaija Saariaho
- Jukka Tiensuu

=== John Heiss ===
this teacher's teachers
Heiss studied with teachers including Milton Babbitt, Jack Beeson, Edward T. Cone, Henry Cowell, Josef Matthias Hauer, Earl Kim, Otto Luening, Darius Milhaud, and Peter Westergaard.
- Lee Hyla [pupils]

=== Carl Heissler ===
this teacher's teachers
Heissler (1823–1878) studied with teachers including Joseph Böhm, Matthias Durst, and Joseph Hellmesberger, Sr..
- Arnold Rosé
- Franz Schalk
- Hans Wessely [pupils]

=== Piers Hellawell ===
this teacher's teachers
Hellawell (1956–) studied with teachers including Nicholas Maw and James Wood.
- Deirdre McKay

=== Pieter Hellendaal ===
this teacher's teachers
Hellendaal (1721–1799) studied with teachers including Giuseppe Tartini.
- William Crotch [pupils]
- Charles Hague [pupils]

=== Stephen Heller ===
this teacher's teachers
Heller studied with teachers including Carl Czerny and Anton Halm.
- Isidor Philipp [pupils]

=== Ferdinand Hellmesberger ===
this teacher's teachers
F. Hellmesberger (1863–1940) studied with teachers including Anton Bruckner and Karl Udel.
- Franz Schmidt [pupils]

=== Georg Hellmesberger, Sr. ===
this teacher's teachers
G. Hellmesberger, Sr. (1800–1873) studied with teachers including Joseph Böhm and Emanuel Aloys Förster.
- Leopold Auer [pupils]
- Jakob Dont [pupils]
- Matthias Durst [pupils]
- Miska Hauser
- Georg Hellmesberger, Jr.
- Joseph Hellmesberger, Sr. [pupils]
- Joseph Joachim [pupils]
- Arnold Rosé [pupils]

=== Joseph Hellmesberger, Jr. ===
this teacher's teachers
J. Hellmesberger, Jr. (1855–1907) studied with teachers including Joseph Hellmesberger, Sr..
- George Enescu [pupils]
- Arthur Nikisch

=== Joseph Hellmesberger, Sr. ===
this teacher's teachers
J. Hellmesberger, Sr. (1828–1893) studied with teachers including Georg Hellmesberger, Sr..
- Robert Fuchs [pupils]
- Joseph Hellmesberger, Jr. [pupils]
- Hans Wessely [pupils]

=== Mara Margaret Helmuth ===
- Bonnie Miksch

=== Heinrich Henkel ===
this teacher's teachers
Henkel (1822–1899) studied with teachers including Johann Anton André and Aloys Schmitt.
- Wilhelm Hill

=== Pierre Henry ===
this teacher's teachers
Henry (born 1927) studied with teachers including Nadia Boulanger and Olivier Messiaen.
- Éliane Radigue

=== George Henschel ===
- Charles W. Clark [pupils]
- Ethel Smyth
- Sarah Robinson-Duff [pupils]

=== Adolf von Henselt ===
this teacher's teachers
Henselt (1814–1889) studied with teachers including Ludwig Berger, Anton Halm, Johann Nepomuk Hummel, Simon Sechter, and Josepha von Fladt.
- Ella Adayevskaya
- Alexander Serov
- Alexander Villoing [pupils]
- Nikolai Zverev [pupils]

=== Hans Werner Henze ===
this teacher's teachers
Henze studied with teachers including Wolfgang Fortner and René Leibowitz.
- Jeffery Cotton
- Cord Meijering
- David Graham
- Detlef Heusinger
- Marcel Wengler
- Gerd Kühr
- Stefan Hakenberg
- Detlev Glanert
- Peter Ruzicka
- David Lang
- Jörg Widmann

=== Philip Herschkowitz ===
- Vyacheslav Artyomov
- Vladimir Dashkevich
- Edison Denisov [pupils]
- Mikhail Druskin
- Elena Firsova
- Natan Fishman
- Leonid Hoffman
- Sofia Gubaidulina
- Leonid Hrabovsky
- Nikolai Karetnikov
- Yuri Kholopov [pupils]
- Alfred Schnittke
- Vladislav Shoot
- Valentin Silvestrov
- Dmitri Smirnov
- Viktor Suslin
- Boris Tishchenko
- Andrei Volkonsky
- Alexander Voustin
- Vladislav Soyfer

=== Johann Wilhelm Hertel ===
this teacher's teachers
Hertel (1727–1789) studied with teachers including Franz Benda and Carl Höckh.
- Carl Friedrich Christian Fasch [pupils]

=== Richard Hervig ===
- Charles Dodge
- David Lang
- Dennis Riley

=== Henri Herz ===
this teacher's teachers
Herz (1803–1888) studied with teachers including Louis-Barthélémy Pradher and Anton Reicha.
- Marie Jaëll
- Charles Kensington Salaman [pupils]
- Ludwig Schuncke
- Joseph Teodore Vilar

=== Norman Herzberg ===
this teacher's teachers
Herzberg (1916-2007) studied with teachers including Vincent Pezzi and Simon Kovar.
- Marita Abner
- Benjamin Kamins
- Mark Kelley
- Carol C. Lowe
- Roger Nye

=== Rogier de Hesdin ===
- Guillaume Dufay

=== Kenneth Hesketh ===
this teacher's teachers
Hesketh (1968– ) studied with teachers including William Bolcom, Simon Bainbridge, Henri Dutilleux, Joseph Horovitz, Stephen Pratt, and Edwin Roxburgh.
- William Dougherty
- Laurence Osborn
- Josephine Stephenson
- Gavin Higgins
- Hannah Kendall
- Lara Poe

=== Myra Hess ===
this teacher's teachers
Hess (1890–1965) studied with teachers including Tobias Matthay and Orlando Morgan.
- Yonty Solomon [pupils]

=== Willy Hess ===
this teacher's teachers
Hess (1859–1939) studied with teachers including Joseph Joachim.
- Ferruccio Bonavia
- Adolf Busch [pupils]
- Arthur Catterall
- Arthur Fiedler
- David Grunschlag [pupils]
- Georg Kulenkampff [pupils]
- Philip Newman
- Nikos Skalkottas
- Tossy Spivakovsky
- Albert Stoessel [pupils]
- Harold Sumberg
- Henri Temianka

=== Adolf Friedrich Hesse ===
- Jacques-Nicolas Lemmens [pupils]

=== Barbara Hesse-Bukowska ===
this teacher's teachers
Hesse-Bukowska (1930– 2013) studied with teachers including Arthur Rubinstein.
- Teresita Gómez

=== Richard Heuberger ===
this teacher's teachers
Heuberger studied with teachers including Robert Fuchs and Wilhelm Mayer.
- Ernst Kanitz [pupils]
- Clemens Krauss [pupils]
- Hans May
- Franz Mittler

=== Désiré Heynberg ===
this teacher's teachers
Heynberg (1831-1897) studied with teachers including François Prume.
- Martin Pierre Marsick [pupils]
- Ovide Musin [pupils]
- César Thomson [pupils]
- Eugène Ysaÿe [pupils]

=== William Hibbard ===
this teacher's teachers
Hibbard studied with teachers including Francis Judd Cooke.
- David Lang

=== Johann Heinrich Hildebrand ===
this teacher's teachers
Hildebrand (1646-1691) studied with teachers including Heinrich Bach.
- Georg Böhm [pupils] (highly probable)

=== John Hingston ===
this teacher's teachers
Hingston (1612-1683) studied with teachers including Orlando Gibbons.
- John Blow [pupils]

=== Edward Burlingame Hill ===
- Leonard Bernstein [pupils]
- Elliott Carter [pupils]
- Irving Fine [pupils]
- Ross Lee Finney [pupils]
- Walter Piston [pupils]
- Roger Sessions [pupils]
- Virgil Thomson [pupils]

=== Ferdinand Hiller ===
this teacher's teachers
Hiller (1811–1885) studied with teachers including Johann Nepomuk Hummel and Aloys Schmitt.
- Max Bruch [pupils]
- Frederick Corder [pupils]
- Charles Donald Maclean
- Friedrich Wilhelm Riem
- Franz Wilke

=== Johann Adam Hiller ===
this teacher's teachers
Hiller (1728–1804) studied with teachers including Gottfried August Homilius.
- Johann Christian Friedrich Hæffner [pupils]
- Gertrud Elisabeth Mara
- Christian Gottlob Neefe [pupils]
- Corona Schröter
- Daniel Gottlob Türk [pupils]

=== Lejaren Hiller ===
this teacher's teachers
Hiller studied with teachers including Milton Babbitt and Roger Sessions.
- Carmelo Bernaola
- James Fulkerson
- Larry Lake
- Ilza Nogueira
- David Rosenboom [pupils]
- Bernadette Speach
- James Tenney [pupils]

=== Paul Hindemith ===
this teacher's teachers
Hindemith studied with teachers including Bernhard Sekles.
- Samuel Adler [pupils]
- Violet Archer
- John Avison
- Louis S. Bagger
- Irwin Bazelon
- Leonard Berkowitz
- Charles L. Bestor
- Easley Blackwood Jr. [pupils]
- Martin Boykan [pupils]
- Wernher von Braun
- Frederick Matthias Breydert
- Charles Faulkner Bryan
- Arnold Cooke
- Norman Dello Joio
- Emma Lou Diemer [pupils]
- Alvin Etler
- Paul Fetler [pupils]
- Lukas Foss [pupils]
- Thomas Frost
- Harald Genzmer [pupils]
- Olga Gorelli
- Guillermo Graetzer [pupils]
- Frank Ll. Harrison
- Bernhard Heiden [pupils]
- Andrew Hill
- Ulysses Kay
- Koichi Kishi
- Heinrich Konietzny
- David Kraehenbuehl
- Felicitas Kukuck
- Mitch Leigh
- Walter Leigh
- Donald Loach
- Willson Osborne
- Hans Otte
- William P. Perry
- Alejandro Planchart
- Mel Powell [pupils]
- Franz Reizenstein
- John Donald Robb
- Willie Ruff
- Oskar Sala
- Gerhard Samuel
- Ruth Schonthal
- Harold Shapero [pupils]
- Alan Shulman
- Robert Strassburg [pupils]
- Joseph Tal
- Tan Xiaolin [pupils]
- Francis Thorne
- Yehudi Wyner [pupils]
- Jón Þórarinsson

=== Clytie Hine ===
this teacher's teachers
Hine (1887–1983) studied with teachers including Frederick Bevan, Medora Henson, and Bryceson Treharne.
- Marge Champion
- Kirk Douglas
- Alfred Drake
- Nanette Fabray
- Kathleen Ferrier
- John Forsythe
- Celeste Holm
- Peter Pears [pupils]
- David Wayne

=== Grete Hinterhofer ===
- Malcolm Bilson

=== Kozaburo Hirai ===
- Akira Miyoshi [pupils]

=== Rozalie Hirs ===
- Edmund Finnis [pupils]
- Cindy Giron [pupils]
- Rob Jones [pupils]
- Tobias Klein [pupils]
- Aino Tenkanen [pupils]

=== Joseph Hislop ===
- Birgit Nilsson

=== Jacob Hochbrucker ===
- Marcel de Marin

=== Carl Höckh ===
- Carl Friedrich Christian Fasch [pupils]
- Johann Wilhelm Hertel [pupils]
- Friedrich Wilhelm Rust

=== Sydney Hodkinson ===
this teacher's teachers
Hodkinson studied with teachers including Milton Babbitt, Edward T. Cone, and Roger Sessions.
- Robert Paterson
- D. J. Sparr

=== K. David van Hoesen ===
- Judith LeClair

=== Finn Høffding ===
this teacher's teachers
Høffding (1899–1997) studied with teachers including Knud Jeppesen, Thomas Laub, and Joseph Marx.
- Pelle Gudmundsen-Holmgreen [pupils]
- Vagn Holmboe [pupils]
- Bent Lorentzen
- Leif Thybo

=== Cynthia Hoffmann ===
this teacher's teachers
Hoffmann (b. unknown) studied with teachers including Margaret Harshaw.
- Pamela Armstrong
- Fleur Barron
- Raehann Bryce-Davis
- Jason Ferrante
- Susan Graham
- William Guanbo Su
- Arthur Levy
- Will Liverman
- Meagan Miller
- Ronnita Miller
- Miles Mykkanen
- Susanna Phillips
- Tommy Richman
- Stacey Tappan
- Davóne Tines
- Nina Warren
- Yang Guang (mezzo-soprano)

=== Paul Hofhaimer ===
- Hans Buchner [pupils]

=== Josef Hofmann ===
this teacher's teachers
Hofmann (1876–1957) studied with teachers including Moritz Moszkowski, Anton Rubinstein, and Heinrich Urban.
- Jean Behrend
- Jorge Bolet
- Abram Chasins
- Shura Cherkassky
- Harry Kaufman
- Ezra Rachlin
- Nadia Reisenberg [pupils]
- Abbey Simon
- Ruth Slenczynska

=== Theodore Holland ===
this teacher's teachers
Holland (1878–1947) studied with teachers including Frederick Corder, Joseph Joachim, and Karel Halíř.
- John Joubert [pupils]
- Arnold van Wyk

=== York Höller ===
this teacher's teachers
Höller (born 1944) studied with teachers including Bernd Alois Zimmermann, Else Schmitz-Gohr, and Karlheinz Stockhausen.
- William Mival
- Wang Ying

=== Alfred Hollins ===
this teacher's teachers
Hollins (1865–1942) studied with teachers including Frits Hartvigson and Edward John Hopkins.
- Cyril Stanley Christopher

=== Robin Holloway ===
this teacher's teachers
Holloway (born 1943) studied with teachers including Alexander Goehr.
- Thomas Adès
- Bertie Baigent
- Jonathan Dove
- Adam Gorb [pupils]
- Robert Saxton [pupils]
- Peter Seabourne
- Judith Weir

=== Vagn Holmboe ===
this teacher's teachers
Holmboe studied with teachers including Finn Høffding and Knud Jeppesen.
- Pelle Gudmundsen-Holmgreen [pupils]
- Egil Hovland
- Bent Lorentzen
- Arne Nordheim
- Per Nørgård [pupils]
- Ib Nørholm
- Alan Stout [pupils]

=== Edward Holmes ===
this teacher's teachers
Holmes (1797–1859) studied with teachers including Vincent Novello.
- Elizabeth Stirling [pupils]

=== Henry Holmes ===
- Arnold Dolmetsch
- Arthur Elwell Fisher
- Jessie Grimson
- Kathleen Parlow

=== William Henry Holmes ===
this teacher's teachers
William Henry Holmes (1812-1885) studied with teachers including Cipriani Potter.
- Charlotte Alington Barnard [pupils]
- Horton Claridge Allison
- William Sterndale Bennett [pupils]
- George Alexander Macfarren [pupils]
- Walter Cecil Macfarren [pupils]

=== Gustav Holst ===
this teacher's teachers
Holst (1874–1934) studied with teachers including George Case, William Stephenson Hoyte, Georges Jacobi, Knud Jeppesen, Hubert Parry, Frederick Sharpe, and Charles Villiers Stanford.
- Arthur Bliss
- Elliott Carter [pupils]
- Cecil Coles
- Joan Cross
- Jane Joseph
- Elizabeth Maconchy [pupils]
- Robin Milford
- Edmund Rubbra
- Catherine Storr
- Percy Turnbull

=== Adriana Hölszky ===
this teacher's teachers
Hölszky studied with teachers including Ştefan Niculescu.
- Agustín Castilla-Ávila
- Jolanta Debicka
- Marios Joannou Elia (1978)
- Carsten Hennig (1967)
- Eunyoung Esther Kim (1973)
- Benjamin Johnson Lang [pupils] (1976)
- Barbara Mayer
- Olga Neuwirth (1968)
- Karola Obermüller (1977)
- Martin Wistinghausen [pupils] (1979)

=== Simon Holt ===
this teacher's teachers
Holt (born 1958) studied with teachers including Anthony Gilbert.
- Tansy Davies

=== Ignaz Holzbauer ===
this teacher's teachers
Holzbauer studied with teachers including Johann Joseph Fux.
- Johann Anton Friedrich Fleischmann
- František Xaver Pokorný
- Carl Stamitz

=== Paul Homeyer ===
this teacher's teachers
Homeyer (1853–1908) studied with teachers including Salomon Jadassohn and Robert Papperitz.
- T. J. Crawford
- Harry Dean [pupils]
- Sigfrid Karg-Elert

=== Gottfried August Homilius ===
this teacher's teachers
Homilius (1714–1785) studied with teachers including Johann Sebastian Bach.
- Johann Adam Hiller [pupils]
- Carl David Stegmann
- Johann Gottlieb Naumann [pupils]
- Daniel Gottlob Türk [pupils]
- Christian Ehregott Weinlig [pupils]

=== Louis Homilius ===
this teacher's teachers
Homilius (1845–1908) studied with teachers including Friedrich Homilius, Anton Rubinstein, and Nikolai Zaremba.
- Alfrēds Kalniņš
- Artur Kapp [pupils]

=== Arthur Honegger ===
this teacher's teachers
Honegger studied with teachers including Vincent d'Indy, André Gedalge, and Charles-Marie Widor.
- Marius Constant
- Ding Shande
- Luc Ferrari
- Simeon ten Holt
- Karel Husa
- Maurice Jarre
- Eugene Kurtz [pupils]
- Richard Markowitz
- Ginette Martenot
- Clermont Pépin
- Michel Perrault
- Allan Pettersson
- Daniel Pinkham
- Yves Ramette
- Lester Trimble
- Margrit Zimmermann
- María Luisa Escobar

=== Edward John Hopkins ===
this teacher's teachers
Hopkins (1818-1901) studied with teachers including William Hawes and Thomas Forbes Walmisley.
- Frederick Scotson Clark [pupils]
- Alfred Hollins [pupils]
- Gordon Saunders [pupils]

=== John Hopkins ===
this teacher's teachers
J. Hopkins (1822–1900) studied with teachers including William Hawes, Edward John Hopkins, and Thomas Forbes Walmisley.
- Frederick Bridge [pupils]

=== J. L. Hopkins ===
- Stephen Austen Pearce

=== Camillo Horn ===
Also known as Kamillo Horn.

- Hedy Frank-Autheried
- Toni Pfeifer

=== Charles Edward Horn ===
this teacher's teachers
Horn studied with teachers including Charles Frederick Horn and Venanzio Rauzzini.
- Michael William Balfe

=== Charles Frederick Horn ===
this teacher's teachers
Horn studied with teachers including Christoph Gottlieb Schröter.
- Michael William Balfe
- Queen Charlotte
- Charles Edward Horn [pupils]

=== Jan Hornziel ===
- Henryk Wieniawski

=== Joseph Horovitz ===
this teacher's teachers
Horowitz (1926-2022) studied with teachers including Gordon Jacob and Nadia Boulanger.
- Tony Britten
- Martin Ellerby
- Kevin Farrell
- Kenneth Hesketh [pupils]
- Cecilia McDowall
- John Wilson (conductor)

=== Vladimir Horowitz ===
this teacher's teachers
Horowitz (1903-1989) studied with teachers including Artur Schnabel, Sergei Tarnowsky, and Felix Blumenfeld.
- Coleman Blumfield
- Ivan Davis
- Alexander Fiorillo
- Gary Graffman [pupils]
- Eduardus Halim
- Byron Janis
- Nico Kaufmann
- Murray Perahia
- Ronald Turini

=== Mieczysław Horszowski ===
this teacher's teachers
Horszowski studied with teachers including Theodor Leschetizky.
- Steven De Groote
- Robert Dennison
- Julius Eastman
- Richard Goode
- Eugene Istomin
- Anton Kuerti
- Cecile Licad
- Murray Perahia
- Kathryn Selby
- Peter Serkin
- Leslie Spotz

=== Alan Hovhaness ===
this teacher's teachers
Hovhaness studied with teachers including Frederick Converse, Heinrich Gebhard, and Bohuslav Martinů.
- Dominick Argento [pupils] (1927–2019)
- John Davison (1930–1999)
- John Diercks (1927-2020)
- Robert Gauldin (b. 1931)
- Gigi Gryce (1925–1983)
- John S. Hilliard (1947-2019)
- W. Francis McBeth (1933–2012)
- Sam Rivers (1923–2011)
- Mary Jeanne van Appledorn (1927–2014)

=== Dorothy Howell ===
this teacher's teachers
Howell (1898–1982) studied with teachers including Granville Bantock, John Blackwood McEwen, Tobias Matthay, and Percy Waller.
- Antoinette Kirkwood

=== Herbert Howells ===
this teacher's teachers
Howells studied with teachers including Charles Villiers Stanford and Charles Wood.
- James Bernard
- Hugo Cole
- David Cox
- Madeleine Dring
- Desmond Dupré
- William Lewarne Harris
- Imogen Holst
- Gordon Jacob [pupils]
- Bryan Kelly
- Mary Lucas
- David Moule-Evans
- Arthur Oldham
- Alan Ridout
- Edwin Roxburgh [pupils]
- Robert Simpson
- Robert Spearing
- Paul Spicer
- Joan Trimble
- Ian Edward Stewart
- Harold Truscott
- Eric Wetherell
- R.W. Wood

=== Jan Hřímalý ===
this teacher's teachers
Hřímalý (1844–1915) studied with teachers including Moritz Mildner.
- Vladimir Bakaleinikov
- Stanisław Barcewicz [pupils]
- Issay Barmas
- Julius Conus
- Arcady Dubensky
- Reinhold Glière [pupils]
- Paul Juon [pupils]
- Iosif Kotek
- Lea Luboschutz
- Alexander Moguilewsky
- Alexander Petschnikoff
- Mikhail Press
- Nikolai Roslavets
- Konstantin Saradzhev [pupils]
- Alexander Schmuller
- Pyotr Stolyarsky [pupils]
- Alfred Wiłkomirski [pupils]

=== Jenő Hubay ===
this teacher's teachers
Hubay studied with teachers including Joseph Joachim.
- Alberto Bachmann [pupils]
- Eddy Brown
- Jelly d'Arányi [pupils]
- Bram Eldering [pupils]
- Ilona Fehér [pupils]
- Carl von Garaguly
- Barnabás von Géczy
- André Gertler [pupils]
- Stefi Geyer [pupils]
- Stephan Ipolyi
- Ferenc Jancsin
- Stephan Kerner
- Géza de Kresz
- Eugene Lehner
- Tibor Ney
- Eugene Ormandy [pupils]
- Ödön Pártos
- Giovanni Pavovich
- Erna Rubinstein [pupils]
- Tibor Serly
- Zoltán Székely [pupils]
- Joseph Szigeti [pupils]
- Gerhard Taschner
- Emil Telmányi [pupils]
- Franz von Vecsey [pupils]
- Sándor Végh [pupils]
- Robert Virovai
- Imre Waldbauer
- Ede Zathureczky
- Nándor Zsolt

=== Hans Huber ===
- Edwin Fischer
- Richard Flury
- Franz Josef Hirt
- Ernst Levy
- Hans Münch
- Hermann Suter
- Werner Wehrli

=== Klaus Huber ===
this teacher's teachers
Huber (1924–2017) studied with teachers including Boris Blacher.
- Reinhard Febel
- Brian Ferneyhough [pupils]
- Michael Jarrell
- Younghi Pagh-Paan
- Wolfgang Rihm [pupils]
- Kaija Saariaho
- Peter-Jan Wagemans

=== Bronisław Huberman ===
- Sophie Carmen Eckhardt-Gramatté
- Ivry Gitlis
- David Grunschlag
- Eric Rosenblith

=== Edwin Hughes ===
this teacher's teachers
Hughes studied with teachers including Rafael Joseffy and Theodor Leschetizky.
- Reginald Bedford [pupils]
- Sascha Gorodnitzki

=== Candelario Huizar ===
- Blas Galindo

=== Arthur Eaglefield Hull ===
- Walter Gaze Cooper
- Frederic Lord
- George Oldroyd
- Alfred Whitehead

=== Pelham Humfrey ===
this teacher's teachers
Humfrey (1647–1674) studied with teachers including Henry Cooke, Christopher Gibbons, and Jean-Baptiste Lully.
- Henry Purcell [pupils]

=== Bertold Hummel ===
this teacher's teachers
Hummel studied with teachers including Harald Genzmer.
- Claus Kühnl [pupils]

=== Johann Nepomuk Hummel ===
this teacher's teachers
Hummel studied with teachers including Johann Georg Albrechtsberger, Wolfgang Amadeus Mozart, and Antonio Salieri.
- Julius Benedict [pupils]
- Carl Czerny [pupils]
- Felix Mendelssohn [pupils]
- Adolf von Henselt [pupils]
- Ferdinand Hiller [pupils]
- August Gottfried Ritter [pupils]
- August Röckel
- Friedrich Silcher
- Sigismond Thalberg [pupils]

=== Engelbert Humperdinck ===
this teacher's teachers
Humperdinck (1854–1921) studied with teachers including Friedrich Gernsheim and Josef Rheinberger.
- Leo Blech
- Edward Joseph Collins
- Arthur Farwell [pupils]
- Luís de Freitas Branco
- Jan van Gilse
- Aurelio Giorni
- Manfred Gurlitt
- Robert Hermann
- Andrés Isasi
- Hans Jelmoli
- Walter Niemann
- Alfred Reynolds
- Ludomir Różycki
- Carl Schuricht
- Leo Spies
- Eduard Steuermann [pupils]
- Robert Stolz
- Otto Urbach
- Yuliya Veysberg
- Siegfried Wagner
- Kurt Weill
- Hermann Hans Wetzler

=== Karel Husa ===
- Byron Adams [pupils]
- David Conte [pupils]
- Christopher Hopkins [pupils]
- David A. Jaffe
- Leonard J. Lehrman [pupils]
- Mark Mandarano [pupils]
- Christopher Rouse [pupils]
- Steven Stucky [pupils]

=== Ernest Hutcheson ===
this teacher's teachers
Hutcheson (1871–1951) studied with teachers including Carl Reinecke and Bernhard Stavenhagen.
- Paul Jacobs

=== Brenda Hutchinson ===
this teacher's teachers
Hutchinson studied with teachers including Robert Erickson, Pauline Oliveros, and Roger Reynolds.
- Wally Scharold

=== Lee Hyla ===
this teacher's teachers
Hyla studied with teachers including John Heiss, David Lewin, and Malcolm Peyton.
- Seth Cluett
- Daniel Felsenfeld
- Koji Nakano

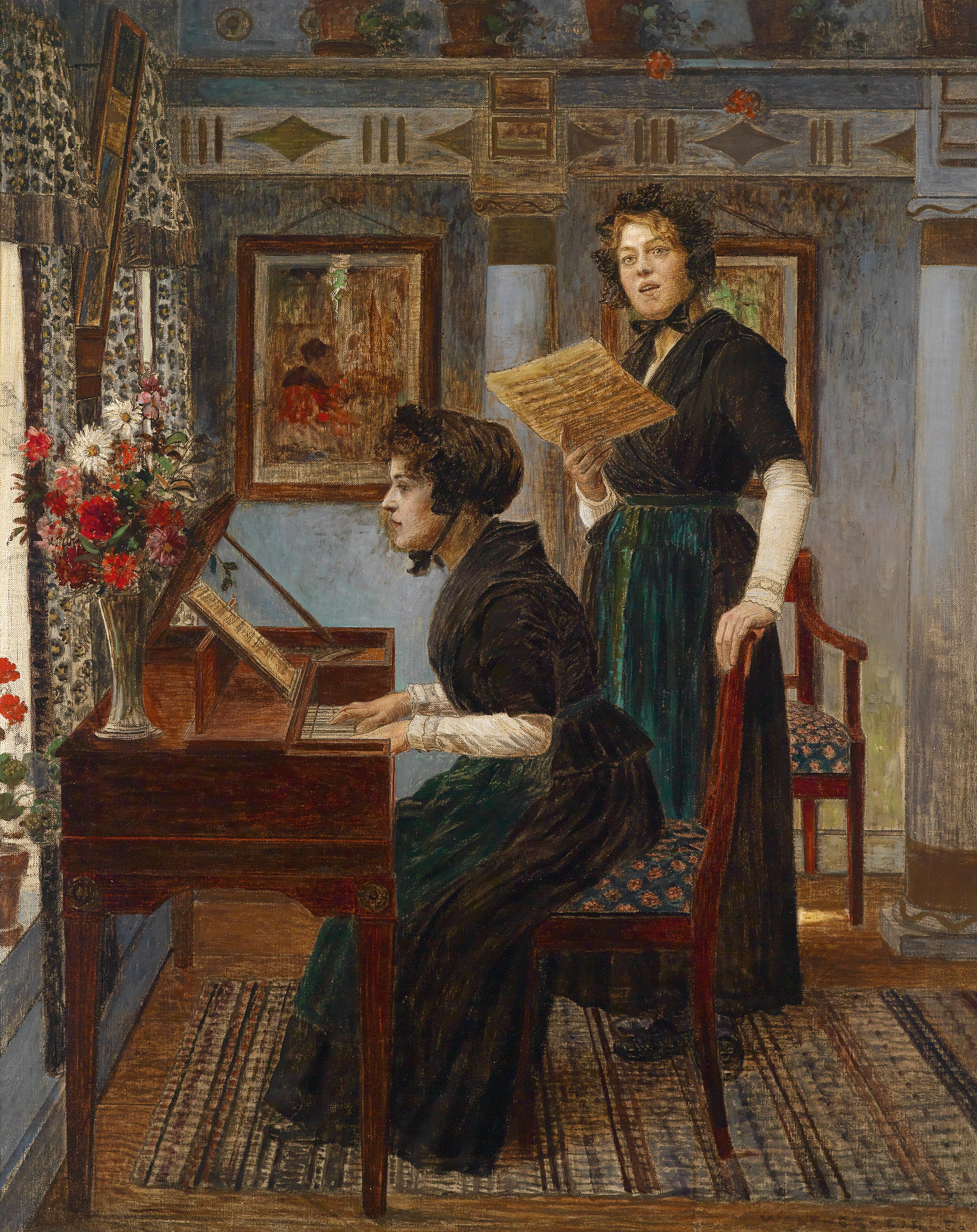

== I ==
=== Konstantin Igumnov ===
this teacher's teachers
Konstantin Igumnov (May 1 [O.S. April 19], 1873, Lebedyan, Tambov Governorate, – March 24, 1948) studied with teachers including Nikolai Zverev, Alexander Siloti, Pavel Pabst, Sergei Taneyev, Anton Arensky, and Mikhail Ippolitov-Ivanov.
- Anatoly Nikolayevich Alexandrov
- Tengiz Amirejibi
- Ryszard Bakst
- Elena Beckman-Shcherbina
- Boris Moiseyevitch Berlin
- Oleg Boshniakovich
- Bella Davidovich
- Issay Dobrowen
- Yakov Flier
- Maria Grinberg
- Aleksandr Iokheles
- Bolesław Kon
- Lev Oborin [pupils]
- Natalia Satina
- Naum Shtarkman
- Rosa Tamarkina
- Evgeny Timakin [pupils]
- Andrzej Wasowski

=== Akira Ifukube ===
- Yasushi Akutagawa
- Maki Ishii
- Teizo Matsumura
- Toshiro Mayuzumi
- Minoru Miki
- Koji Ueno
- Kaoru Wada
- Akio Yashiro

=== Tomojirō Ikenouchi ===
- Hikaru Hayashi
- Ryohei Hirose
- Toshi Ichiyanagi
- Shin’ichirō Ikebe
- Maki Ishii
- Teizo Matsumura
- Toshiro Mayuzumi
- Akira Miyoshi [pupils]
- Akira Nishimura
- Roh Ogura
- Sadao Bekku
- Makoto Shinohara
- Kōhei Tanaka
- Akio Yashiro [pupils]
- Isang Yun

=== Alexander Ilyinsky ===
this teacher's teachers
Ilyinsky (1859–1920) studied with teachers including Theodor Kullak.
- Nikolai Golovanov [pupils]

=== Andrew Imbrie ===
this teacher's teachers
Imbrie studied with teachers including Nadia Boulanger and Roger Sessions.
- Larry Austin [pupils]
- Tamar Diesendruck
- Richard Festinger
- Nils Frykdahl
- Edward Jacobsˌ
- Alden Jenks
- Hi Kyung Kim
- Jonathan Kramer [pupils]
- Frank La Rocca
- Kurt Rohde
- Neil Rolnick
- Laura Schwendinger
- Allen Shearer
- Michael Tenzer [pupils]
- Leslie Wildman
- Carolyn Yarnell
- La Monte Young [pupils]

=== Marc'Antonio Ingegneri ===
- Claudio Monteverdi [pupils]

=== John Ireland ===
this teacher's teachers
Ireland (1879–1962) studied with teachers including Frederic Cliffe, Hubert Parry, and Charles Villiers Stanford.
- Richard Arnell [pupils]
- Benjamin Britten [pupils]
- Alan Bush
- Geoffrey Bush
- Ernest John Moeran
- Helen Perkin
- Percy Turnbull

=== Heinrich Isaac ===
- Pope Leo X
- Balthasar Resinarius [pupils]
- Ludwig Senfl

=== Mikhail Ippolitov-Ivanov ===
this teacher's teachers
Ippolitov-Ivanov (1859–1935) studied with teachers including Nikolai Rimsky-Korsakov.
- Reinhold Glière [pupils]
- Nikolai Golovanov [pupils]
- Sergei Vasilenko [pupils]

=== Jean Eichelberger Ivey ===
- Vivian Adelberg Rudow

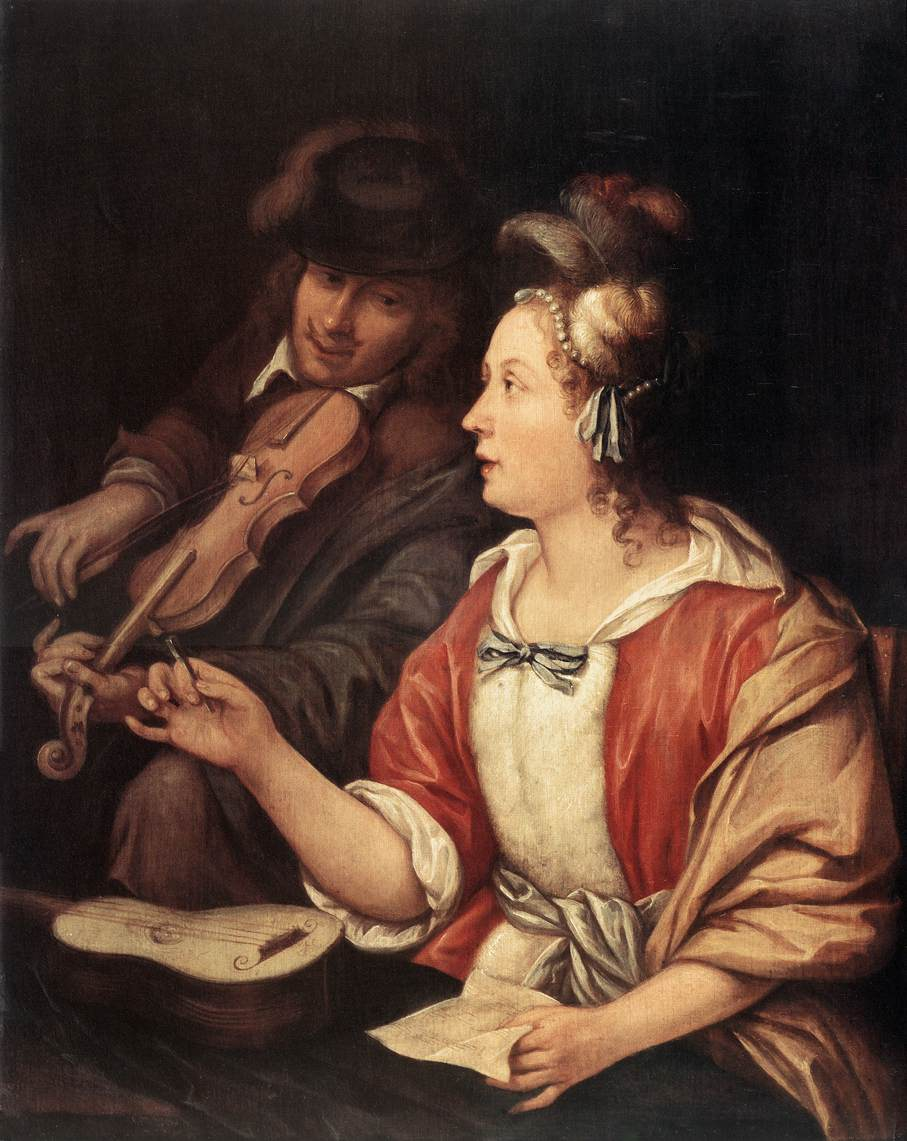

== J ==
=== Francis Jackson ===
this teacher's teachers
Jackson (1917–2022) studied with teachers including Edward Bairstow.
- John Barry

=== Gordon Jacob ===
this teacher's teachers
Jacob studied with teachers including Herbert Howells and Charles Villiers Stanford.
- John Addison
- Malcolm Arnold
- William Blezard
- Philip Cannon
- Ruth Gipps
- David Gow
- Pamela Harrison
- Imogen Holst
- Antony Hopkins
- Joseph Horovitz [pupils]
- Miriam Hyde
- Adrian Jack
- Kenneth V. Jones
- Norman Kay
- Bryan Kelly
- Peter Klatzow
- Dorian Le Gallienne
- Iris Lemare
- Colin Mawby
- Alan Ridout
- Mervyn Roberts
- Esther Rofe
- Bernard Stevens [pupils]
- Michael Tippett [pupils]
- Eric Wetherell
- Grace Williams
- R.W. Wood

=== Frederick Jacobi ===
this teacher's teachers
Jacobi (1891–1952) studied with teachers including Ernest Bloch, Paolo Gallico, and Rubin Goldmark.
- Mark Bucci
- Barbara Pentland
- John Verrall [pupils]

=== Simon E. Jacobsohn ===
- Max Bendix

=== Salomon Jadassohn ===
this teacher's teachers
Jadassohn (1831–1902) studied with teachers including Moritz Hauptmann and Julius Rietz.
- Isaac Albéniz
- Franco Alfano
- Sergei Bortkiewicz
- Fritz Brase
- Ferruccio Busoni [pupils]
- Julián Carrillo
- George Whitefield Chadwick [pupils]
- Mikalojus Konstantinas Čiurlionis
- Frederick Delius
- Cornelis Dopper
- Zdeněk Fibich [pupils]
- Richard Franck
- Albert Fuchs [pupils]
- Edvard Grieg [pupils]
- Battison Haynes [pupils]
- Alfred Hill
- Paul Homeyer [pupils]
- Robert Kajanus
- Sigfrid Karg-Elert
- Jean Paul Kürsteiner
- Ruben Liljefors
- Stevan Mokranjac
- Percy Pitt [pupils]
- Emil von Reznicek
- Hugo Riemann [pupils]
- Émile Sauret [pupils]
- Gustav Schreck
- Christian Sinding
- Ethel Smyth
- George Templeton Strong
- Felix Weingartner
- Richard Wetz
- Bernard Zweers [pupils]

=== Hyacinthe Jadin ===
- Hortense de Beauharnais

=== Alfred Jaëll ===
this teacher's teachers
Jaëll studied with teachers including Carl Czerny and Ignaz Moscheles.
- Benjamin Johnson Lang [pupils]
- Samuel Sanford

=== Ivor James ===
- Hugo Cole
- Amaryllis Fleming
- Martin Lovett

=== Philip James ===
- Bernard Herrmann

=== Leoš Janáček ===
this teacher's teachers
Janáček (1854–1928) studied with teachers including Leo Grill, Franz Krenn, Pavel Křížkovský, Carl Reinecke, František Zdeněk Skuherský, and Oscar Paul.
- Břetislav Bakala
- Osvald Chlubna
- Pavel Haas
- Václav Kaprál
- Jan Kunc [pupils]
- Jaroslav Kvapil
- Slavko Osterc
- Vilém Petrželka [pupils]
- Vilém Tauský

=== Giuseppe Jannacconi ===
this teacher's teachers
Janacconi (1740–1816) studied with teachers including Giuseppe Carpani and Don Socorso Rinaldini.
- Giuseppe Baini [pupils]
- Francesco Basili

=== Émile Jaques-Dalcroze ===
this teacher's teachers
Jaques-Dalcroze (1865–1950) studied with teachers including Anton Bruckner, Léo Delibes, Gabriel Fauré, Robert Fuchs, and Mathis Lussy.
- Ernest Bloch [pupils]
- Fernande Peyrot

=== Philipp Jarnach ===
this teacher's teachers
Jarnach studied with teachers including Ferruccio Busoni, Paul Juon, and Albert Lavignac.
- Ingolf Dahl [pupils]
- Edward Staempfli
- Pozzi Escot

=== Józef Jarzębski ===
- Grażyna Bacewicz
- Eugenia Umińska

=== Hanns Jelinek ===
this teacher's teachers
Jelinek studied with teachers including Arnold Schoenberg.
- Junsang Bahk
- Dawid Engela
- Heinz Karl Gruber
- Petr Kotík
- Alireza Mashayekhi
- Anne-Marie Ørbeck
- Gregory Rose
- Gunnar Sonstevold
- Maj Sønstevold
- Igor Štuhec
- Erich Urbanner

=== John Jenkins ===
- Roger North

=== Donald Jenni ===
- David Lang
- Dennis Riley

=== Knud Jeppesen ===
this teacher's teachers
Jeppesen studied with teachers including Carl Nielsen.
- Finn Høffding [pupils]
- Vagn Holmboe [pupils]
- Gustav Holst [pupils]

=== Karel Boleslav Jirák ===
this teacher's teachers
Jirák studied with teachers including Josef Bohuslav Foerster and Vítězslav Novák.
- Jaroslav Řídký [pupils]
- Elizabeth Maconchy [pupils]

=== Joseph Joachim ===
this teacher's teachers
Joachim (1831–1907) studied with teachers including Moritz Hauptmann and Stanisław Serwaczyński.
- Leopold Auer [pupils]
- Woldemar Bargiel
- Henri Berény
- Fritz Brase
- Willy Burmester [pupils]
- Will Marion Cook
- Carl Courvoisier [pupils]
- Gustav Dannreuther
- Lucien Durosoir
- Bram Eldering [pupils]
- Adila Fachiri
- Sam Franko
- Karel Halíř [pupils]
- Willy Hess [pupils]
- Theodore Holland [pupils]
- Jenő Hubay [pupils]
- Bronisław Huberman [pupils]
- Robert Imandt
- Willem Kes [pupils]
- Karl Klingler [pupils]
- Editha Knocker [pupils]
- Iosif Kotek
- John Marquardt
- Charles Martin Loeffler
- Martin Marsick [pupils]
- Waldemar Meyer
- Andreas Moser [pupils]
- Tivadar Nachéz
- Henri Petri
- Ettore Pinelli [pupils]
- Enrico Polo
- Maud Powell
- Martin Röder
- Arnold Schering [pupils]
- Ernst Skalitzky
- Marie Soldat-Roeger
- Theodore Spiering
- Emil Telmányi [pupils]
- Franz von Vecsey [pupils]
- Ernst Wendel
- Max Wertheim [pupils]
- Gabriele Wietrowetz
- Franz Wilczek
- Leonhard Wolff

=== Ben Johnston ===
this teacher's teachers
Johnston studied with teachers including John Cage, Otto Luening, Darius Milhaud, Robert Moffat Palmer, Harry Partch, Burrill Phillips, and Vladimir Ussachevsky.
- Neely Bruce [pupils]
- William Duckworth
- James Fulkerson
- Kyle Gann
- Jan Gilbert
- Chris Granner
- Maggi Payne [pupils]
- Michael Pisaro
- Dennis Riley

=== Niccolò Jommelli ===
this teacher's teachers
Jommeli (1714–1774) studied with teachers including Francesco Durante, Francesco Feo, and Leonardo Leo.
- Francesco Bianchi [pupils]
- Christian Cannabich [pupils]
- Cristiano Giuseppe Lidarti
- Henri-Joseph Rigel
- Jean-Joseph Rodolphe
- Joseph Aloys Schmittbaur

=== Philly Joe Jones ===
- Rashied Ali

=== Richard Jones ===
- Michael Christian Festing

=== Mihail Jora ===
this teacher's teachers
Jora studied with teachers including Robert Teichmüller.
- Myriam Marbé
- Alfred Mendelsohn
- Octavian Nemescu
- Ștefan Niculescu [pupils]
- Doru Popovici
- Florica Racovitză-Flondor

=== Rafael Joseffy ===
this teacher's teachers
Joseffy (1852–1915) studied with teachers including Ignaz Moscheles.
- Edwin Hughes [pupils]
- Albert Mildenberg
- Moriz Rosenthal

=== John Joubert ===
this teacher's teachers
Joubert (1917–2022) studied with teachers including William Henry Bell, Theodore Holland, Howard Ferguson, and Alan Bush.
- John Casken [pupils]
- Robin Stevens

=== Paul Juon ===
this teacher's teachers
Juon (1872–1940) studied with teachers including Anton Arensky, Jan Hřímalý, and Sergei Taneyev.
- Philipp Jarnach [pupils]
- Gunnar Johansen
- Henry Jolles
- Heinrich Kaminski
- Max Trapp
- Stefan Wolpe [pupils]
