= Høffding =

Høffding (or Hoeffding) is a surname. Notable people with the name include:

- Finn Høffding (1899–1997), Danish composer
- Harald Høffding (1843–1931), Danish philosopher and theologian
- Wassily Hoeffding (1914–1991), Finnish statistician
