= Gennady Cherkasov =

Pianist and conductor (b. 1930, d. 2002)

Gennady Konstantinovich Cherkasov (Russian: Геннадий Константинович Черкасов), (23 February 1930, Leningrad – 18 September 2002, Moscow) was a Russian pianist, conductor and professor.

== Early life ==
Cherkasov moved to Moscow in 1939. He studied piano at Moscow Central Music School for gifted children. He graduated from Samuil Feinberg's class of Moscow Conservatory in 1954. In 1957 he finished his postgraduate studies with Feinberg, and in 1958-1959 studied conducting at Paris Conservatory with Louis Fourestier. In 1961 Cherkasov received his Moscow Conservatory postgraduate conducting diploma (class of Aleksandr Gauk and Leo Ginzburg).

== Career ==
From 1960–1962 Cherkasov worked as a conductor at Moscow Conservatory Opera Studio. In 1962–1964 he worked at Bolshoi Theatre, and from 1964–1972 he was a chief conductor at Moscow Operetta Theatre. In 1972–1996 he served as head of musical programming at the editorial board of USSR (and later Russian) State Television and Radio. Cherkasov taught piano and chamber music at Moscow Conservatory from 1954 until the end of his life. In 1984 he became a chief conductor of Moscow Conservatory Chamber Orchestra.

== Honours ==
- Merited Artist of the RSFSR in 1972
- People's Artist of the RSFSR in 1980.
- Order of the Badge of Honour in 2000.
