= Inglis Gundry =

British writer and musician

- Born: 8 May 1905; Wimbledon, London
- Died: 13 April 2000 (aged 94); London
- Occupations: Composer, musicologist, music pedagogue, writer
- Employer(s): WEA London; University of Cambridge; University of London; University of Surrey

Inglis Gundry (8 May 1905 – 13 April 2000) was an English composer, novelist, musicologist, music pedagogue and writer. He is particularly remembered for his operas and for his numerous books; not only on music, but on a broad array of historical subjects. For five decades he lectured on music appreciation for WEA London and also taught on the music faculties at the University of Cambridge, the University of London, and the University of Surrey.

== Early career and wartime ==
Born in Wimbledon to parents of Cornish descent, Gundry had a passion for Cornish culture and played an instrumental role in preserving Cornish folk songs and carols with the publication of Canow Kernow: Songs and Dances of Cornwall (1966). He had previously been named a bard of the Gorsedh Kernow in 1952.

Gundry was educated at Rokeby and Mill Hill School, where he was scholar. Following this, Gundry studied classics and philosophy at Balliol College, Oxford, law at Middle Temple, and worked for a few years as a barrister before pursuing music studies at the Royal College of Music in 1935 where he was a pupil of Gordon Jacob (orchestration), R. O. Morris (counterpoint), and Ralph Vaughan Williams (composition). He achieved his first success as a composer in 1936 when his Phantasy String Quartet was awarded the Cobbett Prize. His first of several novels, The Countess' Penny, was published in 1934.

Gundry served in the Royal Navy during the Second World War and survived the torpedoing of HMS Welshman on 1 February 1943. Later that year his orchestral suite Heyday Freedom from his opera Return of Odysseus was featured in a performance at The Proms. After the war, he worked as music advisor to the Admiralty's education department and edited The Naval Songbook.

== Opera and later life ==
In 1938 Gundry wrote his first opera Naaman, The Leprosy of War which remains unperformed. He went on to write 12 more operas, including The Return of Odysseus, staged at the Royal College of Music in 1940, and The Logan Rock which premiered at the Minack Theatre on the cliffs at Porthcurno in 1956 with mezzo Edith Coates and conductor Marcus Dods. Avon, an Elizabethan opera on the subject of Essex's 1602 rebellion, predated Gloriana by Benjamin Britten by four years. It was staged at the Scala Theatre in 1949. His eighth opera The Prince of Coxcombs won Morley College's opera composition contest in 1960. His final opera, Galileo, was written in 1992. Gundry became friendly with another Cornish composer of operas, William Lewarne Harris.

His London address during the 1950s was 11, Winterstoke Gardens, N.W.7. During the second half of his life, Gundry became a committed Christian with what he described as "growing conviction". This interest informed some of his activities as both a writer and musician. In 1960 he co-founded the Sacred Music Drama Society in London with whom he conducted concerts of medieval dramas at Easter and Christmas into the 1980s. In 1966 he edited the song book Canow Kernow which helped revive interest in the Cornish folk tradition. Gundry's book, Composers by the Grace of God (1998), examined the role that Christianity played in the lives of many of Western music's greatest composers. An autobiography, The Last Boy of the Family was published in the same year.

Gundry died in London at the age of 94 and is buried at St. Paul's Church, Mill Hill.

== Selected compositions ==
Opera

- Naaman: the Leprosy of War (1938)
- The Return of Odysseus (after Homer) (1939–40)
- The Partisans (1946)
- Avon (The Household Musician) (1949)
- The Horses of the Dawn (school opera, after Euripides: Rhesus, 1950)
- The Tinners of Cornwall (1953)
- The Logan Rock (chamber opera, 1956)
- The Prince of Coxcombs (after Vanbrugh: The Relapse, 1965)
- The Three Wise Men (church chamber opera' 1967)
- The Prisoner Paul (church chamber opera, 1970)
- A Will of Her Own (comic chamber opera, 1972–3)
- The Rubicon (1983)
- Lindisfarne (1986)
- Claudia’s Dream (1989)
- Galileo (1992)

Other works

- Phantasy String Quartet (1936)
- Comedy Overture, orchestra (1939)
- Five Bells, naval suite for chorus and orchestra (1942)
- Heyday Freedom, suite for orchestra (1943)
- The Black Mountains, song cycle (1956)
- Harp Concerto (1973)
- Woman’s Heart, songs for soprano and harp (1974)
- Comedy Symphony for orchestra (based on themes from The Prince of Coxcombs, 1976)
- The Daytime of Christ, oratorio (1978)
- Ruth and Naomi, song-cycle (1993)

== Publications ==
- The Countess' Penny, novel (1934)
- (as editor): Naval Song Book (1945)
- Opera in a Nutshell (Hinrichsen's Miniature Surveys, 1945)
- Men of the Hills, introduction to a new English opera, The Partisans (1946)
- The Nature of Opera as a Composite Art (London, 1947)
- (as editor): Canow Kernow: Songs and Dances from Cornwell (1966)
- Composers by the Grace of God: a Study of Music and Religion (London, 1998)
- The Last Boy of the Family, autobiography (London, 1998)
