= John Hingston =

British composer and organ builder (1612–1683)

John Hingston (1612–1683) was an English composer, organist and viol player who served Charles I of England, the Protector Oliver Cromwell and Charles II of England.

== Biography ==
Born in 1612, little is known about Hingston's early life. A pupil of Orlando Gibbons, Hingston became a composer and viol player.

Hingston first served Charles I as a viol player and as a member of the court band. Hingston was also teacher for the composer and organist John Blow.

When Cromwell assumed power, he appointed Hingston as him court organist and keeper of instruments. He transported a Dallam organ from Magdalen College, Oxford, to his court so that Hingston could play it for him. Hingston also tutored Cromwell's daughters in music.

After the Restoration in 1660, Charles II kept Hingston at the royal court. He continued to play viol for the king, and also served as an organ-builder, tuner and keeper of wind instruments. In 1673 Henry Purcell, then a young chorister, was assigned as Hingston's apprentice after his voice broke. The royal warrant read "...to swear and admit Henry Purcell in the place of keeper, mender, maker, repairer and tuner of the regals, organs, virginals, flutes and recorders and all other kind of wind instruments whatsoever, in ordinary, without fee, to his Majesty, and assistant to John Hingston, and upon the death or other avoidance of the latter, to come into ordinary with fee."

Hingston continued working for Charles II until his death in 1683.

== Contemporary accounts ==
Roger L'Estrange, in his ‘'Truth and Loyalty vindicated,’' 1662, writes: ‘Being in St. James's Park I heard an organ touched in a little low room of one Mr. Hinkson's; I went in and found a private company of five or six persons; they desired me to take up a viol and bear a part. I did so. … By and by, without the least colour of a design, or expectation, in comes Cromwell. He found us playing, and, as I remember, so he left us.’

Hingston is mentioned in the diary of Samuel Pepys.

== Other sources ==
- Campbell, Margaret. Henry Purcell - Glory of His Age. Oxford University Press, 1995. (retrieved 25 July 2011)
