= Horton Claridge Allison =

English pianist and composer (1846–1926)

Horton Claridge Allison (25 July 1846 – 17 October 1926) was an English organist, pianist, composer and music examiner.

== Biography ==
Born in Marylebone, London, he was the son of a language teacher. A child prodigy who performed in public from the age of eight, he studied at the Royal Academy of Music from 1856, with W.H. Holmes, George Macfarren and Louis Plaidy. From 1862 until 1865 he was studying in Leipzig with Ernst Richter, Carl Reinecke, Moritz Hauptmann and Ignaz Moscheles, performing at the Gewandhaus while there. In 1877, he received a Bachelor of Music degree from St John's College, Cambridge, proceeding to a doctorate at Trinity College, Dublin the same year.

Much of his career was spent as a concert pianist, organist and board examiner. He made his formal debut as a concert pianist at the Willis's Rooms in May 1860, began concert tours in 1865, and in 1867 was appointed organist at St James's Church, Westmoreland Street. From 1875 he became the Manchester examiner for the Royal Academy of Music, and organist at St. Paul's Church, Kersal Moor.

Allison was an active composer whose works include a Symphony (1875), two piano concertos, a suite for orchestra, the War March for orchestra, a string quartet (1865), as well as vocal, piano and organ music.

He married his wife Sara in 1869 at St Mary's, Bryanston Square in London, and there were three children. One of them, Godfrey Ely Allison, a doctor living in Petersfield, committed suicide in 1909, aged 26. Allison died in Manchester at his house, 24 Park Range, Victoria Park. At the time of his death his estate was worth £9,136. He is buried in the Southern Cemetery, Manchester.

== Works ==
- Songs: A Song of Welcome; Again the Woods (1860)
- Concert Duet for two pianos (1865)
- Philomele, song (1868, published Ascherberg, 1870)
- The Meeting, song for three voices (1872)
- Organ Sonata in D minor, three movements (1865, published 1879)
- String Quartet (1865)
- Piano Concerto (1870, fp. 1877)
- Sacred Cantata for four solo voices, chorus and orchestra (1871, fp. 1877)
- Boaz and the Reapers, part song (1871)
- The Four Friends, part song (1871)
- Sigh no more, Ladies, part song (1871)
- Lovely Flowers song (1872)
- Oxford Concert Pieces piano solo (pub. Weekes & Co, 1872)
- Cambridge Concert Studies, piano solo (pub. Weekes & Co, 1873)
- O Praise ye the Lord, Christmas anthem (1873)
- War March: Le Champ de Mars for orchestra (1873)
- Cantata for four solo voices, chorus and orchestra (1874)
- Lyrics in Three Sets, piano solo (1874)
- Melodious and Characteristic Pianoforte Studies (two books, 1874)
- Symphony (1875)
- 110th, 117th, and 134th Psalms, for solo voices, chorus, and string orchestra (1876)
- Lord Wolsley's March, brass band (1883)
- Piano Concerto No. 2 (first performed in Manchester, February 1894)
- Suite for orchestra
- Behold, bless ye the Lord, anthem
