= William Lewarne Harris =

English composer and teacher

William Lewarne Harris (23 May 1929 - 17 August 2013) was an English composer and teacher.

Harris was born in Birkenhead. He was educated at the King's School, Canterbury until the war saw him evacuated to St Austell in Cornwall. He performed National Service with the Duke of Cornwall's Light Infantry. Afterwards he studied at the Royal College of Music with Patrick Hadley and later Herbert Howells. While there he won the Lionel Tertis prize for his folk-song influenced Suite for viola and piano (1952). It was later broadcast on BBC Radio by Watson Forbes.

Harris was married in 1956 and the couple had two sons and a daughter. But the marriage ended in divorce and Harris became a single parent of three children, working as a music and piano teacher in various London and Kent schools. He maintained his Cornish roots from his mother's side of the family, frequently returning to Cornwall and becoming friendly with another Cornish composer of operas, Inglis Gundry. He was made a Cornish bard in 2002 in recognition of his support for Cornish music.

He died in a London nursing home on 17 August 2013, aged 84. His memoirs, Knocking on a Bolted Door, were edited by his son Steven and published in 2014. Steven Harris has also written a memoir about his time working as a piano tuner at the Harrods department store in the late 1970s.

== Selected works ==
Harris composed operas, song cycles and orchestral music as well as chamber music. His operas include: The Woman on the Hill (1980), based on a short story by Eleanor Inglefield (a relative of Delius); The Sunken City (1992), his largest opera, telling the story of the mythical submerged city of Ker-ys off the Breton coast; The Shining Ones (2000), set in London's East End of the 1930s; and Rescorla Variations (2001, premiered in 2006 by the Cornwall Chamber Orchestra), about the Cornish national hero Rick Rescorla, who died saving lives at the Twin Towers on 9/11.

The seven song A Cycle of Love and Death, setting Ezra Pound, was composed in 1967 and premiered in 1973 at a Wigmore Hall recital featuring the composer as pianist. The same recital included Stanzas for a Drowned City and the piano duo Sonatina patetico. The orchestral works include three substantial pieces: Dance of Life (1982), Celtic Triptych (1983, for chamber orchestra) and the 20 minute symphonic suite My Country (1987) also arranged for two pianos.

The Camerata Ensemble has recorded the Quintet for recorder and string quartet, which was dedicated to recorder soloist John Turner. There is also a modern recording of the early Suite for viola and piano by Sarah Jane Bradley and John Lenehan.

- Suite for viola and piano (1952, publisher OUP)
- Goldenhair, song (1953, text James Joyce)
- An Irish Pilgrimage, song cycle for baritone and piano (1954, text J M Synge)
- Sibylla's Scena, soprano, clarinet and piano (1955)
- Three Settings Of W.B. Yeats, mezzo-soprano and piano (1959)
- Sonatina patetico for piano duo (1960)
- Four Settings of Ezra Pound for baritone and piano (1963, revised 1988)
- A Cycle of Love and Death, song cycle, baritone and piano, text Ezra Pound (1967)
- Four Seascapes for unaccompanied chorus (1973, text D.M.Knight; L.Henry; T. S. Eliot)
- Stanzas for a Drowned City, song for harp and soprano (fp. 1973)
- Cantata di femmina, chorus and chamber ensemble (1974, text W.B. Yeats)
- The Woman on the Hill, chamber opera in two acts (fp. 26 September 1980, London)
- Dance of Life for orchestra (1982)
- Variations on a Cornish Tune, brass trio (1982, publisher Alphonse Leduc)
- A Celtic Triptych for small orchestra (1983)
- Chansons de Baudelaire, song cycle (1983)
- When The Cornish Came To Town, unaccompanied part song (1984)
- My Country, symphonic suite for orchestra (1987)
- Two Chorales for horn, two trumpets, trombone and tuba (1989)
- Old Mary Kelynack, song (1990, text by the composer)
- The Sunken City, three act chamber opera "in monochrome" (1992)
- Passacaglia for Strings (1996)
- The Secret Kingdom, song cycle for soprano, clarinet and piano (1996, text by the composer)
- Three Dances From 'The Sunken City' for orchestra (1997)
- Three Songs From Cornwall (1997, texts Bert Biscoe, Alan Kent, Donald Rawe)
- Wind Quintet (1997 - includes 'The Entry to the Rose Garden')
- Quintet for treble recorder, two violins, viola and cello (2002, dedicated to John Turner)
- The Mother of Storms, harp and soprano (2002, text by the composer)
- The Shining Ones, opera in four acts (2000)
- Rescorla Variations, opera (2001)
