= Nikolai Korndorf =

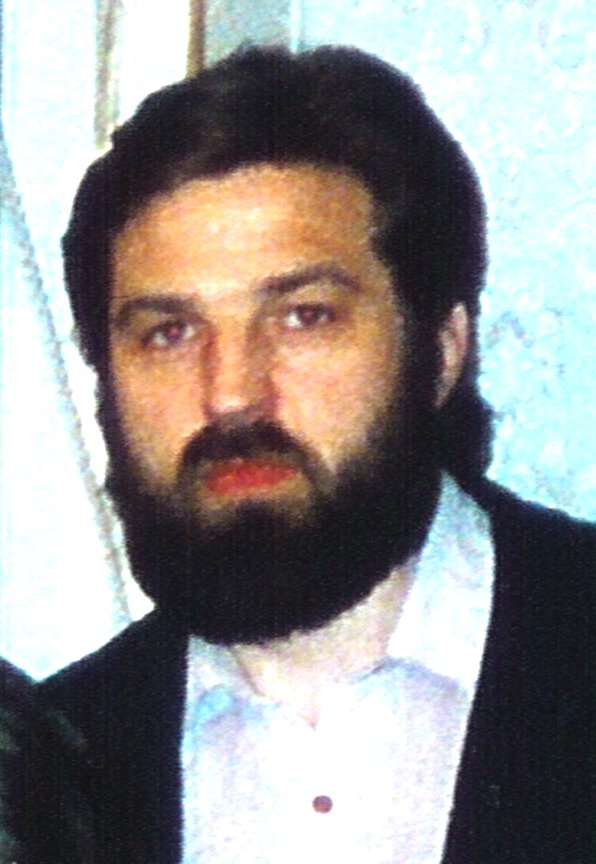
- Nikolai Korndorf, March 3, 1990, Moscow

Background information
- Born: Nikolai Sergeevich Korndorf; January 23, 1947; Moscow, Russian SSR, Soviet Union
- Died: May 30, 2001 (aged 54) Vancouver, British Columbia, Canada
- Genres: Classical, opera
- Occupations: Composer, conductor

Nikolai Sergeevich Korndorf (Russian: Никола́й Серге́евич Корндóрф, January 23, 1947 – May 30, 2001) was a Russian and Canadian (from 1991) composer and conductor. He was prolific both in Moscow, Russia, and in Vancouver, British Columbia, Canada.

== Biography ==
Born in Moscow, (Russian SSR, Soviet Union), Korndorf studied composition with Sergey Balasanian at the Moscow Conservatory from 1965 to 1970. During these years, he wrote a one-act opera A tale on... (Russian: Сказание про... – Skazanie pro...) based on the work of Semyon Kirsanov. In 1973 Korndorf completed post-graduate studies with his opera Feast in the Time of Plague based on the play of the same name by Alexander Pushkin.

He studied conducting with Leo Ginsburg from 1967 to 1979 and taught composition and orchestration at the Conservatory from 1972 to 1991. In 1973 he became a member of the Union of Composers and the Moscow Presidium of the Soviet Composers' Union. He was a co-founder and deputy president of the New Association for Contemporary Music (ACM).

His early works were written in a traditional and academic manner until he adopted an atonal post-expressionist style. Later, he turned to a kind of minimalist repetitive aesthetic, notable in his Confessiones (1979) for double bass and twelve wind instruments, and in Jarilo (1981) an extensive piece for piano and tape. Korndorf developed this aesthetic further in his large-scale works such as the three Hymns (1987–1990), his 3rd and 4th Symphonies, and the opera MR (Marina and Rainer) based on correspondence between Marina Tsvetaeva and Rainer Maria Rilke.

In 1991 Korndorf left Russia for Vancouver, British Columbia, Canada, where he began experimenting with electro-acoustic media. In Canada, he became an associate composer of the Canadian Music Centre and an associate of the Canadian League of Composers. He taught composition at the University of British Columbia towards the end of his life.

A champion of Korndorf's music, Russian conductor Alexander Lazarev has performed and recorded most of his work.

Korndorf died suddenly while playing soccer with friends in 2001. He was 54.

== Selected works ==
- Concertino for viola and string orchestra (1970)
- Sonata for viola solo (1970)
- Feast in the Time of Plague – one-act opera after Alexander Pushkin (1972)
- Symphony No. 1 – for full symphony orchestra (1975)
- Confessiones – for 14 players and tape (1979)
- Symphony No. 2 – for full symphony orchestra (1980)
- Movements – for percussion ensemble (1981)
- Primitive music – for twelve saxophones (1981)
- Yarilo – for piano and tape (1981)
- Yes!! – ritual for three singers, chamber ensemble and tape (1982)
- Singing – for mezzo-soprano and tape (1982)
- Tristful Songs – for chamber choir and percussion (1 player) (1983)
- Con Sordino – for 16 string instruments and harpsichord (1984)
- Lullaby – for two pianos (1984)
- Brass-quintet for two trumpets, horn, trombone and tuba (1985)
- Concerto capriccioso – for violoncello solo, string orchestra and percussion (1986)
- Amoroso – for 11 players (1986)
- The Dance in Metal in Honour of John Cage – for one percussion player (1986)
- In Honour of Alfred Schnittke (AGSCH) – string trio for violin, viola and violoncello (1986)
- Hymn I Sempre Tutti – for full symphony orchestra (1987)
- Hymn II – for full symphony orchestra (1987)
- MR (Marina and Rainer) – chamber opera in one act after J. Lourié (1989)
- Symphony No. 3 – for full symphony orchestra, boys' choir, men's choir, piano solo and narrator (1989)
- Hymn III In Honour of Gustav Mahler – for full symphony orchestra and soprano (1990)
- Mozart-Variations – for string sextet (1990)
- Continuum – for organ and tape (bells, gongs and tam-tams) (1991)
- The Magic Gift of Segnoro Luigi – for percussion ensemble (1991)
- Prologue – for full symphony orchestra (1992)
- Let the Earth Bring Forth – for chamber ensemble (1992)
- String Quartet for two violins, viola and violoncello (1992)
- ...Si Muove! – play for instrumental ensemble, actors and dancers (1993)
- Epilogue – for full symphony orchestra (1993)
- Victor (The Victor) – for full symphony orchestra (1995)
- Welcome! – for female choir and instruments played by singers themselves (1995)
- Get out!!! – for any four or more instruments (1995)
- Welcome! – version for six female voices and instruments played by singers themselves (1995)
- Are You Ready, Brother? – trio for piano, violin, and violoncello (1996)
- Symphony No. 4 Underground music – for full symphony orchestra (1996)
- Music for Owen Underhill and His Magnificent Eight – for chamber ensemble (1997)
- Passacaglia – for solo cello (1997)
- The smile of Maud Lewis – for small symphony orchestra (1998)
- Canzone triste – for harp (1998)
- Musica Nominis Expers – for full symphony orchestra (1998)
- In D – for full symphony orchestra (1998)
- Triptych : Lament, Response and Glorification – for cello and piano (1998–1999)
- A Letter to V. Martynov and G. Pelecis – for piano (1999)
- Echo – for mixed choir and ensemble (1999)
- Merry Music for Very Nice People – for violin, cello, clarinet, piano and percussion (2000)

== Recordings ==
- CD Art and Electronics CD AED 68017
- CD Megadisc MDC 7817: Patricia Kopatchinskaya (violin), Daniel Raskin (viola), Alexander Ivashkin (cello), Ivan Sokolov (piano)
- CD Sony SK 66824: BBC SO, Alexander Lazarev (conductor), Catherine Bott (soprano) (1994)

== Bibliography ==
- Baker's Biographical Dictionary of Musicians, 7th edition, Schirmer books, A Division of Macmillan, Inc. New York. Maxwell MacMillan, Canada, Toronto, 1984. 8th edition, 1992.
- Contemporary Composers, St. James Press, Chicago, London, 1992.
- Kuzina, Olga: Nikolai Korndorf. Kompozitory Moskvy (Moscow's Composers), 4th issue, Moscow, Kompozitor, 1994. pp. 142–165 (in Russian).
- Ferenc, Anna: The Association for Contemporary Music in Moscow: An interview with Nikolai Korndorf. Tempo, 190. September, 1994. pp. 2–4.
- Guljanitskaja, Natalia: On the style of contemporary spiritual musical compositions, Musykalnaya Arademi' No. 1, 1994. pp. 18–25 (in Russian).
- Dubinets, Elena: In memory of Nikolai Korndorf, Musykalnaya Arademia, 2002, No. 2
