= Cecilia McDowall =

British composer (born 1951)

- Born: 1951 (age 74–75); London, England
- Education: University of Edinburgh; Trinity College of Music
- Occupation: Composer
- Awards: British Composer Awards
- Website: www.ceciliamcdowall.co.uk

Cecilia McDowall (born 1951 in London, England) is a British composer, particularly known for her choral compositions.

== Life and career ==
Born in London, McDowall attended Grey Coat Hospital School and read music at the University of Edinburgh, continuing her studies at Trinity College of Music in London and later completing an MMus in composition. She studied with Joseph Horovitz, Robert Saxton and Adam Gorb. She has won many awards and has been short-listed seven times for the British Composer Awards. In 2014 she won the British Composer Award for her choral piece Night Flight.

Her publisher since 2010 has been Oxford University Press. Since 2015, she has been Visiting Composer in Dulwich College, London. In 2015, she served on the panel for a Women Composers Competition of The Arcadian Singers of Oxford. She lives in Chiswick.

== Music ==
McDowall's music has been commissioned and performed by both professional and amateur choirs. A commission from the Portsmouth Festival Choir, The Shipping Forecast, gained her national media attention in June 2011. The work draws together the poetry of Seán Street, the psalm 'They that go down to the sea in ships', and the words of the Shipping Forecast itself.

As with The Shipping Forecast, many of her subsequent choral works have taken their inspiration from extra-musical influences. The cantata 70 Degrees Below Zero was commissioned by the Scott Polar Research Institute and the City of London Sinfonia as part of the Scott 100 Festival of Events in 2012, and premiered at Symphony Hall, Birmingham on 3 February 2012. Night Flight was composed in 2013 to commemorate the pioneering flight of American aviator Harriet Quimby across the English Channel. Its first performance was given by the Choir of Clare College, Cambridge at the Fringe in the Fen Festival on 6 July 2013. The five-movement cantata Everyday Wonders: The Girl from Aleppo (2018) was based on Nujeen Mustafa's biography, retold by Kevin Crossley-Holland. And the large scale Da Vinci Requiem, using texts derived from Leonardo da Vinci's Notebooks and from the Requiem Mass, was written to coincide with the 500th anniversary of da Vinci's death. It was premiered by the Wimbledon Choral Society and the Philharmonia Orchestra at the Royal Festival Hall on 7 May 2019.

Other choral pieces using more traditional religious or literary or religious texts include the substantial Stabat Mater composed for St Albans Choral Society in 2004 and the Three Latin Motets commissioned the same year by the City of Canterbury Chamber Choir, which have since been recorded by the Phoenix Chorale. The Latin Adoro te devote was written for the Westminster Cathedral Choir in 2015 and When time is broke (Three Shakespeare Songs), for the BBC Singers in 2016.

Although choral music dominates her output, McDowall has also composed four stage works (including the chamber opera Airbourne, 2014), orchestral music (such as Great Hills for solo violin, 2 flutes and strings, 2007, and Dance the Dark Streets, a concerto grosso with piano obbligato, 2005), and a considerable body of chamber and instrumental music, including Dream City for flute, clarinet, harp and string quartet (2002), the two movement The Night Trumpeter for trumpet, violin, cello, clarinet, bassoon and piano (2002), and the String Quartet No 1, subtitled the case of the unanswered wire, from 2004. The impressionistic Y Deryn Pur ('The Gentle Dove') was written for the 2007 Presteigne Festival and scored for oboe, violin, viola and cello.

== Selected recordings ==
Notable recordings of McDowall's music include:

- A Tree is a Song: secular choral works (2026), The Rodolfus Choir, Signum Classics SIGCD988
- Rise heart; thy Lord is risen, All shall be Amen (2023), Caritas Chamber Choir, Ulysses Arts UA230120
- Century Dances (2023), Tailleferre Ensemble, Ulysses Arts UA220060
- Da Vinci Requiem, 70 Degrees Below Zero (2023), Wimbledon Choral Society, Signum SIGCD749
- British Chamber Music, SOMM CD 0653 (2022) (includes Y Deryn Pur)
- Sacred Choral Music (2021), Stephen Layton, Choir of Trinity College, Cambridge, Hyperion CDA68251
- Works for Organ (2021), William Fox (organ), Lucy Humphris (trumpet), Naxos 8.579077
- If I Touched the Earth (2020), Jeremy Huw Williams, Paula Fan, Lorelt LNT143
- A Time for All Seasons (2019), Bristol Choral Society, Delphian DCD 34242
- Colour of Blossoms (various chamber music) (2017), Trio Derazey, Deux-Elles, DXL 1171
- Three Latin Motets (No. 3) (2015), Wells Cathedral School Choralia, Naxos 8.573427
- Laudate (2009) CCCC, George Vass, Dutton Epoch CDLX 7230
- Spotless Rose (2008), Phoenix Chorale, Charles Bruffy, Chandos 5066
- Stabat Mater, On Angel's Wings, Three Latin Motets (2007), CCCC, Joyful Company of Singers, CDLX 7197
- Proclamation (2006), International Celebrity Trumpet Ensemble, Brass Classics
- Seraphim (2005), Orchestra Nova, George Vass, Dutton Epoch CDLX 7159
- Ave maris stella , Magnificat (2004), CCCC, George Vass, Dutton Epoch CDLX 7146
- Piper's Dream (2002), Emma Williams, Richard Shaw, Ensemble Lumière, DXL 1033
