= Leonid Grin =

Soviet-born American conductor (born 1947)

Leonid Gavrilovich Grin
- Леонид Гаврилович Грин
- Born: June 19, 1947 (age 79); Dnepropetrovsk, Ukrainian SSR
- Occupation: Conductor

Leonid Gavrilovich Grin (Russian: Леонид Гаврилович Грин, IPA: [lʲɪɐˈnʲid ɡrʲin]) (born June 19, 1947) is a Soviet-born American conductor.

== Biography ==
Grin was born in Dnepropetrovsk, Ukrainian SSR (today part of Ukraine). From early childhood he studied piano and composition. Later he studied conducting at the Moscow Conservatory with Leo Ginzburg and Kirill Kondrashin. After graduating with honors he was appointed associate conductor of the Moscow Philharmonic Orchestra. Before his emigration he conducted orchestras across the Soviet Union including the Leningrad Philharmonic Orchestra and Moscow Radio Symphony Orchestra.

In 1981 Grin immigrated with his family to the United States. Soon after Leonard Bernstein became his mentor and selected him to be one of the first conducting fellows of the Los Angeles Philharmonic Orchestra. During this period Grin conducted and recorded with various orchestras in North America and Western Europe.

Grin has been music director of the Tampere Philharmonic Orchestra, San Jose Symphony Orchestra, (Saarländisches Staatstheater) and the National Symphony Orchestra of Chile.

Among the soloists that Grin has collaborated with are Yo-Yo Ma, Itzhak Perlman, Barbara Hendricks, Misha Maisky, Yefim Bronfman, Evgeny Kissin, Frederica von Stade, and Isaac Stern.

As a teacher Grin served as Professor of Symphony and Opera Conducting at the faculty of the University of Houston School of Music, the Gstaad Menuhin Festival, and the Järvi Academy. His most notable student is Paavo Järvi.
