= Dennis Riley =

American classical composer

Dennis Riley (28 May 1943 – 6 May 1999) was an American composer whose style extends from early Webernesque music to a later embrace of neo-romanticism.

He was born in Los Angeles, CA, his family moving in 1950 to Lakewood, CO. At the University of Colorado his teachers included Storm Bull. He received a Master of Music in composition (1968) from the University of Illinois, and a Ph.D. in composition (1973) from the University of Iowa, where some of his teachers were George Crumb and Ben Johnston. He taught at California State University, Fresno (1971—74), and Columbia University (1974—77). He died of AIDS in New York.

His large oeuvre, almost all published by C. F. Peters, includes two operas with libretti by Joseph Pazillo: Rappaccini’s Daughter (1981–84), after the Hawthorn's story and Cats’ Concert (1983), a children's opera. He was notable as a very early adopter of score writing software.

== Sources ==
- Cassaro, James P. (2001). "Dennis Riley". In Sadie, Stanley; Tyrrell, John (eds.). The New Grove Dictionary of Music and Musicians (2nd ed.). London: Macmillan Publishers. ISBN 978-1-56159-239-5..
