= Koji Nakano (composer) =

Japanese composer (born 1974)

Koji Nakano (中野 浩二, Nakano Kōji; born August 1974) is a Japanese composer.

== Early life and education ==
Nakano was born in Japan. He received his bachelor's degree and master's degree in composition from the New England Conservatory of Music in Boston. From 2002 to 2003, he studied with Dutch composer Louis Andriessen in Amsterdam and at the Royal Conservatory of Hague as the Japanese Government Overseas Study Program Artist. In 2006, he received his Ph.D. in composition from the University of California, San Diego.

== Career ==
As a guest professor, he has taught composition at Taipei National University of the Arts, National Taiwan University of Arts, National Chiao Tung University, and Seoul National University. In the winter quarter of 2013, he was a visiting professor at the University of California, Santa Cruz, where he taught world music composition.

As the co-founder of the Asian Young Musicians' Connection, Nakano commissions compositions from emerging Asian composers alongside worldwide professional musicians for its regular concert in Asia and North America. He is the Head of International Affairs in the Faculty of Music and Performing Arts at Burapha University in Thailand, where he also teaches composition as a full-time faculty member. At Burapha, he is also the Director of International Programs for the Annual Music and Performing Arts International Festival and the Artistic Director of the Annual Experimental Thai Music Laboratory for Young Composers. In the fall of 2016, he held the Scripps Erma Taylor O'Brien Distinguished Visiting Professorship at Scripps College in the U.S.
