= Adam Gorb =

British composer and academic

- Born: 12 March 1958 (age 68); Cardiff, Wales
- Education: Cambridge University; Royal Academy of Music; University of Birmingham
- Genres: Contemporary classical music
- Occupations: Composer, academic
- Instrument: Piano
- Website: adamgorb.co.uk

Adam Gorb (born 1958) is a British classical composer and academic. He is best known for his compositions for wind ensemble, opera, and chamber music. He served as the Head of School of Composition at the Royal Northern College of Music from 2000 to 2023. His compositions have been performed, broadcast, and recorded worldwide, spanning opera, wind ensemble, orchestral, and chamber music.

== Biography ==
Gorb was born in Cardiff, Wales, and moved with his family to London in 1963 at the age of five. He began composing at the age of ten. In 1973, at the age of fifteen, he wrote a 26-piece keyboard collection titled A Pianist's Alphabet, a selection of which was performed by pianist Susan Bradshaw for a BBC Radio 3 broadcast in 1976. Around this time, his early scores were examined by Benjamin Britten, who offered advice and encouragement shortly before his death; Gorb's compositional talent was also recognised by musicologist Hans Keller.

Gorb studied music at Cambridge University from 1977 to 1980 under composers Hugh Wood and Robin Holloway. After graduating, he divided his time between composition and working as a musician in the theatre, earning a living as a répétiteur with Sadler's Wells and the Royal Ballet.

In 1987, he studied privately with Paul Patterson, later continuing under Patterson at the Royal Academy of Music to complete his Master of Music degree with honours. In 2013, he completed a PhD in Composition at the University of Birmingham.

He served as the Head of School of Composition at the Royal Northern College of Music (RNCM) in Manchester from 2000 to 2023. His notable students include the composer Cecilia McDowall, who studied with him privately.

== Selected works ==
- Metropolis (1992) – won the Walter Beeler Memorial Prize (1994)
- Wedding Breakfast (1993) – a four-minute dramatic scena for solo soprano, written to a text, by the composer, of phonetic pseudo-Russian.
- Awayday (1996) for wind ensemble / orchestra.
- Yiddish Dances (1998) – a five-movement suite for symphonic wind orchestra combining classical frameworks with Klezmer folk styles, composed for the 60th birthday of conductor Timothy Reynish.
- Towards Nirvana (2002) – a symphonic wind ensemble piece commissioned by the Tokyo Kosei that won a British Composer Award (2004)
- Adrenaline City (2006) – a concert overture for wind band that won a British Composer Award.
- Farewell (2008) – a work for wind band that won a British Composer Award.
- Eternal Voices (2010) – an oratorio themed around the war in Afghanistan with a libretto by Ben Kaye, premiered at Exeter Cathedral.
- Anya 17 (2012) – an opera with a libretto by Ben Kaye highlighting the realities of human trafficking, which premiered in Liverpool and Manchester before receiving international productions.
- The Path to Heaven (2018) – a one-act opera with libretto by Ben Kaye concerning the Holocaust, premiered at the Royal Northern College of Music.
