= Bent Lorentzen =

Danish composer (1935–2018)

Bent Lorentzen (11 February 1935, Stenvad – 3 October 2018, Copenhagen) was a Danish composer. He was one of the outstanding figures in contemporary Danish music. His works are frequently performed at festivals at home and abroad, and he had established particularly close links with musical life in Poland and Germany. He was honoured with several international prizes and was named Choral Composer of the Year in Denmark in 1989 (Source: Edition·S – music¬sound¬art – Denmark).

Bent Lorentzen was born in Stenvad, a village on Djursland, East Jutland. He studied musicology at the university in Aarhus and at the Royal Danish Academy of Music in Copenhagen. He was a pupil of Knud Jeppesen, Finn Høffding, Vagn Holmboe and Jørgen Jersild. After his final examination he taught at the Academies of Music in Aarhus and Copenhagen for several years. (Source: Bonde 2005)

Lorentzen was one of the earliest pioneers in the field of Danish electronic music (The Bottomless Pit in 1972 for the Nordic Music Days in Oslo, and Visions 1978), which was also introduced with an educational aim: the LP Elektronmusikkens materiale [The Material of Electronic Music, 1968] and the LP Water – electronic music for children, 1968. (Source: Bonde 2005)

Lorentzen's orchestral music includes concertos for oboe (1980), cello (1984), piano (1984), saxophone (1986), trumpet (1991) and violin (2001); his chamber music comprises solo works for organ, piano, trumpet, saxophone, clarinet, guitar, violin, cello and double-bass, as well as string quartets and works with mixed ensembles (2-12 instruments). He also composed numerous choral works in a dramatic style. His last opera Der Steppenwolf (Libretto after Hermann Hesse's novel by Michael Leinert) was first performed in Aarhus 2016 in a semi-concert version.

== Awards ==
Lorentzen held a number of important posts in different organisations in the Danish musical life, and he was the artistic director of the Ebeltoft Festival 1990-93. He was a prizewinner at several foreign competitions such as the Prix Italia in 1970 (for the opera Euridice), the Serocki composers' competition in 1984 (for the chamber work Paradiesvogel), the International Competition for Choir Compositions in Austria 1987 (for Olof Palme), the Olivier Messiaen Organ Prize in 1988 (for Luna), Vienna Modern Masters in 1991 (for the Piano Concerto) and the Music and Poetry Prize in Belgium in 1989 (for Enzensberger's Prozession). He was awarded "Danish Choir Composer of the year" in 1990 and the Carl Nielsen Prize in 1995 and in 2003 the Wilhelm Hansen Composer Prize. Since 1982 and until his death, Lorentzen had received the lifelong grant of the Danish Art Council. (Source: Bonde 2005)

== Selected works ==
Bent Lorentzen's works are published in Denmark by Edition Wilhem Hansen, Copenhagen and Edition Samfundet, Copenhagen.

Opera and musical theatre

- Bill and Julia (1991)
- Cain and Abel (2005/06)
- Do You Know The Tune They're Playing? (Die Musik kommt mir äusserst bekannt vor) – Mozart Panorama (1974)
- Eine Wundersame Liebesgeschichte (A wondrous love story) -Tristan Variations (1979)
- The End!? (1969)
- Euridice (1965; radio opera 1969)
- Fackeltanz (1993)
- Friisholm (1971)
- Den Stundesløse/The Fussy Man (1994), after the play by Ludvig Holberg
- Orfeo (1992), after Monteverdi's opera
- Pergolesi's Homeservice (1998), after Pergolesi's "La Serva Padrona"
- The Magic Brillant (1994)
- The Serpent (1964;1974)
- Stalten Mette (1963; 1980; TV 1981)
- Studies for Two (1967)
- Toto The Clown (1985)
- Der Steppenwolf (1999), after the novel by Hermann Hesse
- Jeppe (2009), after the play by Ludvig Holberg

Orchestra

- Latin Suite I (1984)
- Partita (1976)
- Tide (1971)

Soloist(s) and orchestra

- Cello Concerto (1984)
- Gewitter im Juni (2000)
- Hunting Concerto (1996)
- My Bride is Like a Garden (1972)
- Oboe Concerto (1980)
- Partita (1994)
- Piano Concerto (1984)
- Saxophone Concerto (1986)
- Tivoli (2006)
- Violin Concerto (2001)
- Regenbogen (1991)
- Double concerto for trumpet and trombone (1999)

Large ensemble (7 or more players)

- Cyclus 4
- Paesaggio (1983)
- Paradiesvogel (1983)
- Wunderblumen (1982)
- Zauberspiegel (1998)
- Steppenwolf-Fragment (2000)

Works for 2-6 players

- Flamma (2001)
- Mambo (1982)
- Orfeo Suite (1992)
- Quadrata (1963)
- Quartetto Barbaro (1990)
- Samba (1980)
- Schumann-variations (1993)
- Warszawa (1983)
- Cello Scenes (1990)

Solo works (excluding keyboard)

- Birds (2001)
- Circles (1996)
- Cries (1991)
- Round (1981)
- Diamond (1983)
- Granite (1971)
- Quartz (1971)
- Sif's Golden Hair (2006)
- Tears (1992)
- Tiefe (1993)
- Circus (2001)

Solo keyboard(s)

- Jupiter (1995)
- Luna (1984)
- Mars (1985)
- Saturnus (1996)
- Sirrum (1986)
- Sun (1982)
- Triplex (1974)
- Venus (1996)
- Nachtigall (1988)
- Nimbus (1977)
- Puncti (1972)

Solo voices, chorus, orchestra, narrator

- Genesis (1992)
- The Tinder Box (2003)
- Comics (1987)

Chorus a cappella / chorus plus one instrument

- 3 Madrigals (1977
- Ammen Dammen Des (1981)
- Auschwitz (1987)
- Graffiti (1984)
- Mund (1989)
- Olof Palme (1986)
- Prozession (1988)
- Purgatorio (1975)

Solo voice(s) and up to six players

- 11 Danish Lovesongs (2003)
- Erotic Hymns (1998)
- Carnaval (1976)
- Dejligste rose (1989)
- Den Lidendes Mund (2000)
- Far verden, far vel (1989)
- Fire Kingo-koralmotetter (2004)
- Her vil ties, her vil bies (1989)
- Ich bin eine Rose (1988)
- Når mit øje, træt af møje (1989)
- Siv Vand og Måne (1997)
- Tristan und die Künigîn (1987)

Music for young performers

- 9 Easy Pieces for Strings (1964)

Electroacoustic works

- The Bottomless Pit (1972)
- Cloud-Drift (1973)
- Visions (1978)

== Selected discography ==
- 5 Easy Pieces

Abgrund - Colori - Goldranken - Nachtigall

Piano Works Dacapo: 8.224246

- Do You Know The Tune They're Playing - Mozart Panorama

Die Musik kommt mir äusserst bekannt vor!

Chamber opera Helikon: HCD 1012

- Hunting Concerto

Ensemble Århus Sinfonietta Conductor Søren K. Hansen and Thomas Søndergaard

Dacapo: 8.226516

- Intersection

Aarhus Brass Quintet

Paula: PACD 82

- Mambo

Ensemble The Danish Trio

Paula: PACD 57

- Contemporary Denmark 1992

The Danish Trio, Esbjerg Ensemble, Kontra etc.

Danish Music Export: MXPCD 0292

- Concertos for Oboe and Trumpet

Ensemble Aarhus SO, Frans Rasmussen

Merete Hoffmann (oboe), Martin Schuster (trumpet)

Dacapo: DCCD 9314

- Piano Concerto

Ensemble Århus Sinfonietta

Conductor Søren K. Hansen and Thomas Søndergaard

Erik Kaltoft (piano)

Dacapo: 8.226516

- Piano Concerto Music From Six Continents

Ensemble Slovak RSO, Szymon Kawalla

Vienna Modern Masters: VMM 3009

- Syncretism

Composers: Cope/Bräm/Haubenstock-Ramati/Lorentzen/Kaczynski

Ensemble MW2 Vienna Modern Masters: VMM 2024

- An introduction to electronic music

Record CHESTER JWC 1001

Format: Vinyl, LP; Country: UK; Released: 1968

Style: Musique Concrète, Education, Spoken Word, Experimental

Credits: Compilation Producer, Narrator - Bent Lorentzen

- A Wondrous Love Story - Tristan Variation

Opera. Label: Kontrapunkt. 2005

- "Erotic Hymns" - "Four Danish Chorale Motets" - Flamma (organ and percussion) - Triplex (organ) - Saturnus (organ)

Morten Frank Larsen (barytone). Jens E. Christensen (organ). Joanna Stroz (percussion.

Label: dacapo 8.226568
