= Finn Høffding =

Danish composer

Niels Finn Høffding (10 March 1899 – 29 March 1997) was a Danish composer. Høffding was born and died in Copenhagen. He studied composition under Knud Jeppesen and Thomas Laub, and then under Joseph Marx in Vienna from 1921-22. His works first became well known in Denmark in the 1920s, particularly the piece Karlsvognen (chorus and orchestra, 1924). He began to study folk music about 1930, and founded the Copenhagen School of Folk Music in 1931. From 1931 he also taught at the Royal Danish Academy of Music, where he served as director after 1954. In 1956 and 1958 he was awarded the Nielsen Prize. His pupils include Pelle Gudmundsen-Holmgreen, Vagn Holmboe, Bent Lorentzen, and Leif Thybo. See: List of music students by teacher: G to J#Finn Høffding.

In addition to composing, Høffding also wrote several theoretical treatises.

== Works ==
Note:This list is incomplete

=== Opera ===
- Kejserens nye klæder (1928)
- Kilderejsen op. 15 (1942)

=== Choral ===
- 4 DIAPSALMATA (Søren Kierkegaard words, four diapsalmata (aphorism) from Either/Or vol. I. 1977
- Karlsvognen (chorus and orchestra, 1924)
- Christofer Columbus (1937)
- Kantate til Det Kongelige Danske Musikkonservatoriums årsfest (1948)
- Giordano Bruno (1968)

=== Orchestral ===
- Romance for Violin and String orchestra (1918)
- Concerto grosso (strings, piano and harp – 1920)
- Symphony No. 1 "Sinfonia impetuosa" op. 3 (1923)
- Symphony No. 2 "Il canto liberato" op. 5 (1924)
- Suite from Kejserens nye klæder (The Emperor’s New Clothes) op. 9 (1927)
- Symphony No. 3 op. 12 (1928)
- Overture for small orchestra (1930)
- Overture for amateur orchestra op. 18 (1931)
- Concerto for oboe and string orchestra (1933)
- Symphony No. 4 "Sinfonia concertante" for piano, wind quintet and string orchestra op. 25 (1934)
- Evolution, Symphonic Fantasy No. 1 (1939)
- Fanfare, concert piece for orchestra (1939)
- Det er ganske vist, Symphonic Fantasy No. 2 (1940)
- Fire minespil, suite for orchestra (1944)
- Majfest, Fantasy on Danish folk dances (orchestra 1945)
- Fantasia concertante op. 67(1965)

=== Chamber music ===
- String Quartet No. 1 op. 2 (1920)
- String Quartet No. 2 op. 6 (1925)
- Chamber piece for soprano, oboe and piano (1927)
- Dialoger for oboe and clarinet op. 10 (1927)
- Wind Quintet op. 36(1940)
- Sonata for oboe and piano (1943)
- Familien Vind, quintet for flute, oboe, clarinet, horn and bassoon op. 53 (1954)

=== Piano ===
- Syv lette klaverstykker (Seven light piano pieces) op. 15 (1931)
- Tre lettere klaverstykker (Three lighter piano pieces) op. 16 (1931)
- Sonatine in C (piano 1951)
- 7 små episoder for piano 4 hands (piano 1951)
- 20 små episoder for piano (1954)
- Kanon for piano (1959)
- Fem klaverstykker (five piano pieces) (1965)
