= Ralph W Wood =

English businessman, amateur composer and musical writer (1902–1987)

Ralph Walter Wood (also R.W. Wood, 31 May 1902 – 28 March 1987) earned his living as a businessman but was also a writer on music subjects and an amateur, though prolific, composer. He helped form the Society for the Promotion of New Music.

Born in Plumstead, London, he was mostly self-taught in music, apart from a few further education lessons from Gordon Jacob, Richard Henry Walthew and Herbert Howells at the Guildhall School of Music and Morley College. He worked at the Port of London Authority. As a composer working in his spare time he typically signed himself R.W. Wood. He wrote his Symphony No 1. in G minor, Op. 22 around 1923. Some of his pieces – such as the Three Studies for piano, composed in 1939 – were later published. He also composed a string trio (performed on 8 February by the London String Trio at a London Contemporary Music Centre concert in 1949), at least three string quartets, and a Piano Concerto which was premiered at the Cheltenham Music Festival in 1960. There were also two operas, The Demand Boys (1959) and The Dead (1961).

The composer began self-publishing many of his works in later life. Posthumously, his Third Quartet was broadcast by the Dartington String Quartet in June 1979. The British Music Collection holds an archive of his surviving scores.

Wood was also a writer on musical subjects, contributing essays on Mendelssohn, Tchaikovsky, Sibelius and others to publications including The Musical Times and Music and Letters. He worked several times with the editor Gerald Abraham. He famously commented that Sibelius' Violin Concerto "was the best that Tchaikovsky ever produced".

He was married to Mary Louise Ducret (of Swiss/French parentage) and there was one daughter, Diana Simmonds (1930–2017). They lived at various times in Ilford, Wimbledon and (by 1950) at 5 Doughty Street in Holborn.

== Selected compositions ==
- Symphony in G minor, Op. 22 (circa 1923)
- Concerto for string orchestra (1933, British Music Collection)
- Divertimento for clarinet, french horn and string trio (1937)
- Three Songs (1939, first broadcast 1953, published 1982, Bradwell, Essex: Anglian Edition)
  - 'La Vision'
  - 'Le Rat qui s'est retire du monde'
  - 'Les Séparés'
- Suite for small orchestra (1939, British Music Collection)
- Three Studies for piano (1939, published Joseph Williams, 1950)
- Piano Quartet (1944, published 1982, Bradwell, Essex: Anglian Edition)
- Piano Concerto (1946, premiered Cheltenham, 1960)
- String Quartet No. 2 (1948, published 1985, Bradwell, Essex: Anglian Edition)
- Curfew (Longfellow), for choir and piano, published Stainer & Bell, 1949)
- String Trio (1949)
- Symphony No. 2 (1950, British Music Collection)
- String Quartet No. 3 (1952, published Bradwell, Essex: Anglian Edition)
- And When Icicles Hang for male voices (published 1953)
- Quiet Pilgrimage, Choral Sinfonietta, texts Drummond, Shelley, Shakespeare, Campion. (1955)
- Six Elegies for piano (published Augener in 1955)
- The Demand Boys, opera (1959)
- The Dead, opera (1961)
- Symphony No. 3 (1966, British Music Collection)
- Sequenza for double wind quintet (1967, Composer's Guild)
- Piano Sonata (published 1968, Bradwell, Essex: Anglian Edition)
- Sweet, be not proud (Robert Herrick), madrigal for six voices (published 1968, Bradwell, Essex: Anglian Edition)
- Celebrazione for orchestra (published 1969, Bradwell, Essex: Anglian Edition)
- Concerto for oboe and strings (published 1973, Paigles, Essex: Anglian Edition)
- Facets for wind band and optional percussion ((published 1976, Bradwell, Essex: Anglian Edition)
- Concerto da camera for ten instruments (published 1977, Paigles, Essex: Anglian Edition)
- Piano Quartet No. 2 (published 1980, Bradwell, Essex: Anglian Edition)
- Sonatina for flute and guitar (published 1984, Bradwell, Essex: Anglian Edition)
- Sonatina for recorder and piano (published 1985, Bradwell, Essex: Anglian Edition)

== Selected writings ==
- 'The Meaning of Beethoven', in Music & Letters, Vol. 15, Issue 3, July 1934, pp. 209–221
- 'The Future of Music-Making ', in The Musical Times , Vol. 80, No. 1152, February 1939, p. 9
- 'Psychology and Musical Texture', in The Musical Times, Vol. 83, No. 1191. January 1942, p. 140
- 'Sibelius's Use of Percussion', in Music & Letters, Vol. 23, No. 1 (January 1942), pp. 10–23
- 'Mendelssohn', in The Musical Times, Vol. 83, No. 1197 (November 1942), pp. 329–331
- 'Debussy and the Minor Second', in Musical Opinion, March 1943, p. 193
- 'Miscellaneous Orchestral Works', in The Music of Tchaikovsky , ed. Gerald Abraham (1946)
- 'The Miscellaneous Orchestral and Theatre Music' , in The Music of Sibelius , ed. Gerald Abraham (1947)
- Contributor to A.L. Bacharach (ed.): The Music Masters, Pelican, 1957
- 'Skryabin and His Critics' in Monthly Musical Record, November–December 1957
