= Ferenc Jancsin =

Hungarian classical violinist (1912–2002)

Ferenc Jancsin (2 April 1912, Budapest – 2002) was a Hungarian classical violinist and music educator, and the concertmaster of the Hungarian State Opera.

== Education ==
He studied violin at the Franz Liszt Academy of Music in Budapest (1929–1933), where his teachers were Oszkár Studer and Ede Zathureczky, and from 1931 Jenő Hubay in his master class. His chamber music teacher was Leó Weiner.

== Career ==
Jancsin started his career as the member of the Hungarian State Opera's orchestra in 1933. He became its first concertmaster of it in 1936, and held the post until 1971. Before World War II, he gave solo concerts Hungary and in Sweden, Austria, Italy, and Czechoslovakia. After the war, he stayed in Hungary, where he founded his chamber group in 1947, the Jancsin quartet, which and led it until 1968. Besides his solo concerts, and chamber music concerts he became a lecturer at the Béla Bartók Conservatory in Budapest.

He made his first recordings under the label of the Hungarian music publisher Radiola from 1930; now these are published by the Rózsavölgyi és Társa Kft on CD.

== Sources ==
- Szabolcsi Bence - Tóth Aladár: Zenei lexikon, Zeneműkiadó Vállalat, 1965. II. p. 266. "Jancsin Ferenc", in Hungarian
- Jancsin Ferenc, 1997. április, Muzsika
