= Leif Thybo =

Danish organist and composer

Leif Thybo (12 June 1922 – 24 January 2001) was a Danish organist and composer. He studied theory with Vagn Holmboe before entering the Royal Danish Academy of Music where he was taught instrumentation by Poul Schierbeck, organ by Emilius Bangert, and theory by Finn Høffding. His music is characterized by a clarity of expression and stringency of construction.

He was a professor of music theory at the Royal Danish Academy of Music from 1965 to 1990. Amongst his pupils are the composers María Luisa Ozaita and Frederik Magle.

== Notable works ==
- Preludio, pastorale e fugato, op.11 (1948)
- Preludium (1950)
- Concerto per organo (1953–54)
- Concerto (1956)
- Passacaglia con Intermedios (1961)
- Contrasti per organo (1965)
- Liber organi (1967)
- Compenius-suite (1968)
- Mouvement Symphonique (1979)

== See also ==
- List of Danish composers
