= Leo Ginzburg =

Soviet conductor (1901–1979)

Leo Moritsevich Ginzburg (or Ginsburg; Russian: Лео Морицевич Гинзбург; Warsaw, April 12, 1901 – Moscow, November 1, 1979) was a Soviet conductor and pianist of Polish Jewish origin. He conducted the Moscow State Symphony Orchestra (МГАСО) after Lev Steinberg and Nikolai Anosov.

His students at the Moscow Conservatory included among others Michail Jurowski, Nikolai Korndorf, Fuat Mansurov, Alexander Anisimov, Leonid Grin, Vladimir Fedoseyev, and the Chinese conductor Cao Peng.

He conducted, on occasion, the USSR State Radio Symphony Orchestra, and was noted for recordings of Tchaikovsky.

== Recordings ==
- Tchaikovsky: Symphony in E-flat;
- Tchaikovsky: Symphony no.7
- Alexander Glasunow (1865–1936): Carnaval Ouverture op. 45 with S. Sherman, orgue, Moscow Radio Symphony Orchestra
