= List of music students by teacher: N to Q =

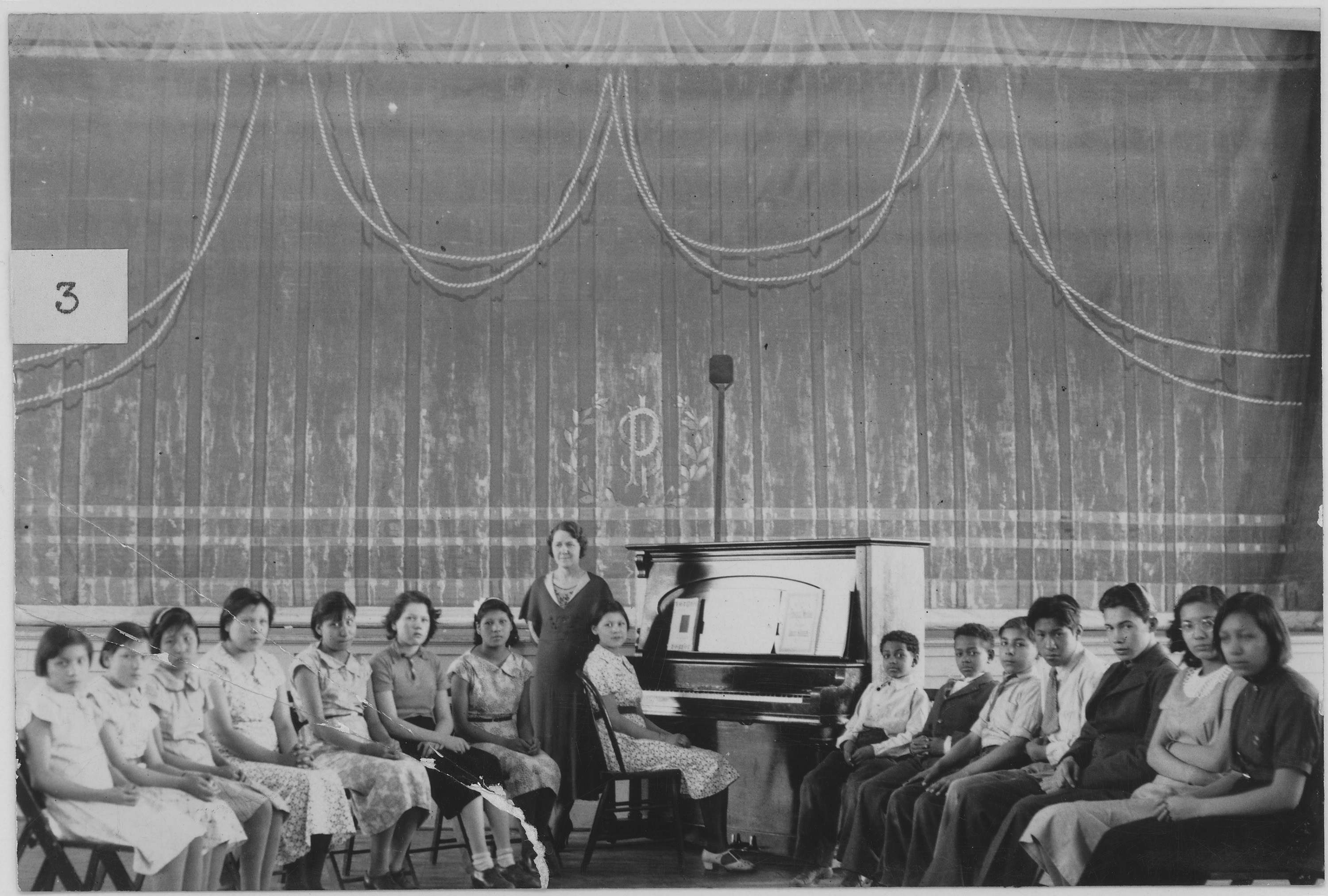

This is part of a list of students of music, organized by teacher.

== N ==
=== François Joseph Naderman ===
this teacher's teachers
Naderman (1781–1835) studied with teachers including Jean-Baptiste Krumpholz.
- Nicolas-Charles Bochsa [pupils]
- Félix Godefroid
- Théodore Labarre

=== Paul Nani ===
this teacher's teachers
Nani (1906– 1986) studied with teachers including Carlo Fiamingo, Vincenzo di Donato, and Ermanno Wolf-Ferrari.
- Charles Camilleri [pupils]

=== Giovanni Maria Nanino ===
this teacher's teachers
G. M. Nanino (1543 or 1544 – 1607) studied with teachers including Giovanni Pierluigi da Palestrina.
- Gregorio Allegri
- Antonio Brunelli
- Antonio Cifra
- Giovanni Bernardino Nanino
- Pier Francesco Valentini

=== Eduard Nápravník ===
- Thérèse Leschetizkaya-Dolinina

=== James Nares ===
this teacher's teachers
Nares (1715-1783) studied with teachers including Bernard Gates, Maurice Greene, William Croft, and Johann Christoph Pepusch.
- Samuel Arnold
- Thomas Attwood [pupils]
- Edmund Ayrton [pupils]

=== Pietro Nardini ===
this teacher's teachers
Nardini (1722–1793) studied with teachers including Giuseppe Tartini.
- Bartolomeo Campagnoli
- Giovanni Francesco Giuliani

=== Johann Naret-Koning ===
- Walther Davisson
- Ferdinand Küchler

=== Pandit Pran Nath ===
this teacher's teachers
Nath (1918–1996) studied with teachers including Abdul Wahid Khan.
- Joan Allekotte
- George Brooks
- Rhys Chatham
- Don Cherry
- Brian Crittenden
- John Da'ud Constant
- Alex Dea
- Sheila Dhar
- Henry Flynt
- Simone Forti
- Jon Gibson
- Michael Harrison
- Jon Hassell
- Catherine Christer Hennix
- Shabda Kahn
- Sri Karunamayee
- Lee Konitz
- Douglas Leedy [pupils]
- Rik Masterson
- W.A. Mathieu
- Rose Okada
- Charlemagne Palestine
- Terry Riley [pupils]
- Hayat Helen Rubardt
- Sargam Shah
- Michael Stirling
- Lee Torchia
- Bernard Xolotl
- La Monte Young [pupils]
- Yoshi Wada
- David Weinrib
- Marian Zazeela

=== Johann Gottlieb Naumann ===
this teacher's teachers
Naumann (1741–1801) studied with teachers including Johann Adolph Hasse, Gottfried August Homilius, and Giuseppe Tartini.
- Friedrich August Pitscher

=== Lev Naumov ===
this teacher's teachers
Lev Naumov (1925–2005) studied with teachers including Heinrich Neuhaus.
- Tatyana Chudova [pupils]
- Alexander Tchaikovsky [pupils]

=== Gaetano Nava ===
- Michael Maybrick
- Charles Santley

=== Karel Navrátil ===
this teacher's teachers
Karel Navrátil (1867–1936) studied with teachers including Guido Adler and Felix Salzer.
- Arthur Hinton
- Helen Hopekirk
- John Powell
- Carl Adolph Preyer
- Alexander Winkler [pupils]

=== Karl Navrátil ===
this teacher's teachers
Karl Navrátil (1836–1914) studied with teachers including Gustav Nottebohm.
- Eduard Schütt
- Anna Yesipova [pupils]

=== Grażyna Pstrokońska-Nawratil ===
this teacher's teachers
Pstrokońska-Nawratil (1947–...) studied with teachers including Pierre Boulez and Olivier Messiaen.
- Kasia Glowicka

=== Elmira Nazirova ===
this teacher's teachers
Nazirova (1928–2014) studied with teachers including Dmitri Shostakovich.
- Aida Huseynova

=== Charles Neate ===
this teacher's teachers
Neate (1784–1877) studied with teachers including John Field, Emanuel Aloys Förster, Peter Winter, and Joseph Woelfl.
- Charles Kensington Salaman [pupils]

=== Christian Gottlob Neefe ===
this teacher's teachers
Neefe (1748–1798) studied with teachers including Johann Adam Hiller.
- Ludwig van Beethoven [pupils]

=== Marcantonio Negri ===
- Lucia Quinciani

=== August Neithardt ===
- Wilhelm Taubert

=== Dimitar Nenov ===
this teacher's teachers
Nenov (1901–1953) studied with teachers including Egon Petri.
- Vera Baeva
- Svetla Protich
- Triphon Silyanovski [pupils]

=== Heinrich Neuhaus ===
this teacher's teachers
Neuhaus (1888–1964) studied with teachers including Aleksander Michałowski.
- Amalya Baiburtyán
- Ryszard Bakst
- Victor Derevianko [pupils]
- Emil Gilels
- Anton Ginsburg
- Vera Gornostayeva
- Tamara Guseva
- Zdeněk Hnát
- Tikhon Khrennikov [pupils]
- Vladimir Krainev
- Alexei Lubimov
- Radu Lupu
- Yevgeny Malinin
- Berta Maranz
- Evgeny Mogilevsky
- Aleksey Nasedkin
- Lev Naumov [pupils]
- Sviatoslav Richter
- Alexander Slobodyanik
- Nina Svetlanova
- Alexander Tchaikovsky [pupils]
- Eliso Virsaladze
- Yakov Zak
- Igor Zhukov

=== Sigismund von Neukomm ===
this teacher's teachers
Neukomm (1778–1858) studied with teachers including Joseph Haydn and Michael Haydn.
- Franz Xaver Wolfgang Mozart

=== Arthur Newman ===
- Samuel Ramey

=== Jean Louis Nicodé ===
- Otto Taubmann [pupils]

=== Otto Nicolai ===
this teacher's teachers
Nicolai (1810–1849) studied with teachers including Carl Friedrich Zelter.
- Salvatore Meluzzi [pupils]

=== Willem Nicolaï ===
- Georg Hendrik Witte

=== Ștefan Niculescu ===
this teacher's teachers
Niculescu (1927–2008) studied with teachers including Mihail Andricu and Mihail Jora.
- Adriana Hölszky [pupils]
- Mihail Jora [pupils]

=== Louis Niedermeyer ===
this teacher's teachers
Niedermeyer (1802–1861) studied with teachers including Emanuel Aloys Förster, Ignaz Moscheles, and Niccolò Antonio Zingarelli.
- Gabriel Fauré [pupils]
- Georges Sporck

=== Carl Nielsen ===
this teacher's teachers
Nielsen (1865–1931) studied with teachers including Orla Rosenhoff.
- Thorvald Aagaard (1877–1937)
- Harald Agersnap (1899–1982)
- Emilius Bangert (1883–1962)
- Jørgen Bentzon (1897–1951)
- Nancy Dalberg (1881–1949)
- Henry Holst (1899–1991)
- Knud Jeppesen [pupils] (1892–1974)
- Herman David Koppel (1908–1998)
- Poul Schierbeck [pupils] (1888–1949)
- Mogens Wöldike (1897–1988)

=== Arthur Nikisch ===
- Henryk Opieński
- Louis Persinger [pupils]

=== Tatiana Nikolayeva ===
this teacher's teachers
Nikolayeva (1924-1993) studied with teachers including Aleksandr Goldenweiser.
- Mark Clinton
- Nikolai Lugansky

=== Henriette Nissen-Saloman ===
this teacher's teachers
Nissen-Saloman (1819–1879) studied with teachers including Frédéric Chopin and Manuel García.
- Yelizaveta Lavrovskaya

=== Luigi Nono ===
this teacher's teachers
Nono (1924–1990) studied with teachers including Gian Francesco Malipiero and Hermann Scherchen.
- Don Banks
- Nicolaus A. Huber [pupils]
- Helmut Lachenmann [pupils]
- Wolfgang Motz [pupils]
- Jacqueline Nova
- Andreas Raseghi [pupils]
- Eric Salzman
- Serge Tcherepnin [pupils]
- Olga Neuwirth

=== Paul Nordoff ===
this teacher's teachers
Nordoff (1909–1977) studied with teachers including Rubin Goldmark.

Vincent Persichetti [pupils]

=== Per Nørgård ===
this teacher's teachers
Nørgård (born 1932) studied with teachers including Vagn Holmboe and Nadia Boulanger.
- Hans Abrahamsen [pupils]
- Deirdre Gribbin
- Niels Marthinsen
- Steen Pade
- Wayne Siegel
- Bent Sørensen

=== Homer Norris ===
- Olin Downes
- Philip James
- John Patton Marshall

=== Zygmunt Noskowski ===
this teacher's teachers
Noskowski (1846–1909) studied with teachers including Apolinary Kątski, Friedrich Kiel, and Stanisław Moniuszko.
- Grzegorz Fitelberg
- Ludomir Różycki
- Apolinary Szeluto
- Karol Szymanowski [pupils]

=== K. P. H. Notoprojo ===
Also known to his students as "Pak Cokro".

- Lou Harrison [pupils]
- Vincent McDermott
- Mark Nauseef

=== Gustav Nottebohm ===
this teacher's teachers
Nottebohm (1817–1882) studied with teachers including Simon Sechter.
- Eusebius Mandyczewski [pupils]
- William Charles Ernest Seeboeck [pupils]
- Fritz Steinbach [pupils]

=== Vítězslav Novák ===
this teacher's teachers
Novák (1870–1949) studied with teachers including Antonín Dvořák.
- Emil Axman
- Sabin Drăgoi
- Fidelio Friedrich Finke
- Alois Hába [pupils]
- Karel Boleslav Jirák [pupils]
- Mykola Kolessa [pupils]
- Jan Kunc [pupils]
- Alexander Moyzes [pupils]
- Slavko Osterc
- Vilém Petrželka [pupils]
- Sláva Vorlová

=== Vincent Novello ===
this teacher's teachers
Novello (1781–1861) studied with teachers including Samuel Webbe.
- George Rodwell [pupils]
- Edward Holmes [pupils]

== O ==
=== Lev Oborin ===
this teacher's teachers
Lev Nikolayevich Oborin (Russian: Лев Николаевич Оборин, Lev Nikolaevič Oborin; Moscow, 11 September [O.S. 29 August] 1907 – Moscow, 5 January 1974) studied with teachers including Elena Gnesina , Alexander Gretchaninov , and Konstantin Igumnov.
- Vladimir Ashkenazy
- Alexander Bakhchiev
- Boris Berman
- Anatoly Dokumentov
- Andrei Egorov
- Olga Kiun
- Eduard Miansarov
- Lev Natochenny
- Minoru Nojima
- Dmitri Sakharov
- Mikhail Voskresensky

As assistant

- Elisso Virsaladze

=== Eugene O'Brien ===
this teacher's teachers
O'Brien (born 1945) studied with teachers including Robert Beadell, John Eaton, Donald Erb, Iannis Xenakis, and Bernd Alois Zimmermann.
- Christopher Hopkins [pupils]
- Robert Paterson

=== Vincent O'Brien ===
this teacher's teachers
O'Brien (1871–1948) studied with teachers including Robert Prescott Stewart.
- James Joyce
- John McCormack
- Margaret Burke Sheridan

=== Johannes Ockeghem ===
- Antoine Brumel
- Loyset Compère
- Josquin des Prez

=== David Oistrakh ===
this teacher's teachers
Oistrakh (1908–1974) studied with teachers including Pyotr Stolyarsky and Mykola Vilinsky.
- Cyrus Forough
- Oleg Kagan
- Valery Klimov
- Gidon Kremer
- Oleh Krysa
- Victor Pikayzen
- Jean Ter-Merguerian
- Emmy Verhey

=== Arne Oldberg ===
this teacher's teachers
Oldberg (1874–1962) studied with teachers including Theodor Leschetizky and Josef Rheinberger.
- Cecilia Clare Bocard
- Joseph Brye
- Howard Hanson [pupils]

=== Arthur O'Leary ===
this teacher's teachers
O'Leary (1834–1919) studied with teachers including William Sterndale Bennett, Moritz Hauptmann, Ignaz Moscheles, Louis Plaidy, Cipriani Potter, Ernst Richter, and Julius Rietz.
- Stanley Hawley
- Alicia Adélaide Needham
- Agnes Clune Quinlan
- Charles Villiers Stanford [pupils]
- Arthur Sullivan [pupils]

=== Pauline Oliveros ===
this teacher's teachers
Oliveros (1932–2016) studied with teachers including Robert Erickson and Seymour Shifrin.
- Cory Arcangel
- Betsey Biggs
- Jorge Boehringer
- Anne Bourne
- Wendy Mae Chambers
- Seth Cluett
- Sidney Corbett
- Corey Dargel
- Andrew Deutsch
- Paul Dresher
- Arnold Dreyblatt
- David Dunn
- Brenda Hutchinson [pupils]
- Lam Bun-Ching
- Lynn Lonidier
- Alexina Louie
- Richard Marriott
- Jennifer & Kevin McCoy
- Dana Reason
- Ben Richter
- Eric Glick Rieman
- John Warthen Struble
- Ned Sublette
- Doug Van Nort
- Heidi Von Gunden
- Betty Ann Wong

=== František Ondříček ===
this teacher's teachers
Ondříček (1857–1922) studied with teachers including Antonín Bennewitz.
- Karel Navrátil [pupils]
- Achille Rivarde [pupils]

=== Giacomo Orefice ===
- Victor de Sabata
- Lodovico Rocca

=== Buxton Orr ===
this teacher's teachers
Orr (1924–1997) studied with teachers including Benjamin Frankel.
- Deirdre Gribbin
- Barry Guy
- Gary Higginson
- Philip Sawyers
- Debbie Wiseman

=== Robin Orr ===
this teacher's teachers
Orr (1909–2006) studied with teachers including Arthur Benjamin and Cyril Rootham.
- John Exton
- George Guest
- Peter Hemmings
- Ian Kemp
- William Mann
- Raymond Warren

=== Juan Orrego-Salas ===
this teacher's teachers
Orrego-Salas (1919–2019) studied with teachers including Pedro Humberto Allende, Aaron Copland, George Herzog, Paul Henry Lang, Randall Thompson, and Domingo Santa Cruz Wilson.
- Ricardo Lorenz
- Miguel Roig-Francolí
- Sylvia Soublette
- Darwin Vargas
- Carol Ann Weaver

=== William Ortiz-Alvarado ===
- Robert Paterson

=== Alexander Ossovsky ===
this teacher's teachers
Ossovsky (1871–1957 studied with teachers including Nikolai Rimsky-Korsakov.
- Dmitri Shostakovich [pupils]
- Alexander Tcherepnin

=== August von Othegraven ===
- Herbert Eimert [pupils]

=== Ernst Julius Otto ===
- Bruno Zwintscher [pupils]

=== Hall Overton ===
this teacher's teachers
Overton (1920–1972) studied with teachers including Darius Milhaud and Vincent Persichetti.
- Teddy Charles
- Dennis Russell Davies
- Doris Duke
- Talib Rasul Hakim
- Margarita Luna de Espaillat
- Marian McPartland
- Carman Moore
- Steve Reich
- Laurie Spiegel

=== Frederick Ouseley ===
this teacher's teachers
Ouseley (1825–1889) studied with teachers including Stephen Elvey.
- Charles A. E. Harriss
- John Stainer [pupils]

== P ==
=== Pavel Pabst ===
this teacher's teachers
Pabst (1854–1897) studied with teachers including Anton Door and Franz Liszt.
- Lev Conus
- Aleksandr Goldenweiser [pupils]
- Konstantin Igumnov
- Nikolai Medtner

=== Antonio Maria Pacchioni ===
this teacher's teachers
Pacchioni (1654–1738) studied with teachers including Giovanni Maria Bononcini.
- Tomaso Antonio Vitali [pupils]

=== Carmelo Pace ===
this teacher's teachers
Pace (1906–1993) studied with teachers including Carlo Fiamingo and Thomas Mayne.
- Charles Camilleri [pupils]

=== Johann Pachelbel ===
this teacher's teachers
Pachelbel (1653–1706) studied with teachers including Heinrich Schwemmer and Georg Caspar Wecker.
- Johann Christoph Bach (organist at Ohrdruf)
- Johann Heinrich Buttstett
- Charles Theodore Pachelbel
- Wilhelm Hieronymus Pachelbel
- Nicolaus Vetter

=== Martijn Padding ===
this teacher's teachers
Padding (born 1956) studied with teachers including Louis Andriessen.
- Oscar Bettison

=== Christian Padel ===
this teacher's teachers
Padel (1845–1930) studied with teachers including Ignaz Moscheles.
- George Butterworth

=== Ignacy Jan Paderewski ===
this teacher's teachers
Paderewski (1860–1941) studied with teachers including Theodor Leschetizky.
- Lennart Lundberg [pupils]
- Witold Małcużyński
- Ernest Schelling
- Zygmunt Stojowski
- Dalhousie Young

=== Niccolò Paganini ===
this teacher's teachers
Paganini (1782–1840) studied with teachers including Giacomo Costa, Gasparo Ghiretti, Ferdinando Paer, Antonio Paganini, Alessandro Rolla, and Giovanni Servetto.
- Catarina Calcagno
- Gaetano Ciandelli [pupils]
- Apollinaire de Kontski
- Camillo Sivori

=== John Knowles Paine ===
this teacher's teachers
Paine (1839–1906) studied with teachers including Carl August Haupt.
- Richard Aldrich
- John Alden Carpenter
- Frederick Converse [pupils]
- Arthur Foote
- Hugo Leichtentritt [pupils]

=== Giovanni Pierluigi da Palestrina ===
- Giovanni Dragoni
- Annibale Stabile
- Tomás Luis de Victoria

=== Robert Moffat Palmer ===
this teacher's teachers
Palmer (1915–2010) studied with teachers including Howard Hanson.
- Jerry Amaldev
- Paul Chihara
- David Conte
- Daniel Dorff
- Jack Gallagher
- Bernhard Heiden [pupils]
- John S. Hilliard
- Brian Israel
- Ben Johnston [pupils]
- Leonard Lehrman
- Christopher Rouse [pupils]
- Steven Stucky [pupils]
- Gil Trythall [pupils]

=== Selim Palmgren ===
- Joonas Kokkonen

=== Carter Pann ===
this teacher's teachers
Pann (born 1972) studied with teachers including Samuel Adler, William Albright, Warren Benson, William Bolcom, Michael Daugherty, David Liptak, Joseph Schwantner, Bright Sheng, and Barry Snyder.
- Greg Simon

=== Giacomo Panizza ===
- Emilio Naudin

=== Bindo Paoli ===
- Claudio Arrau [pupils]

=== Rosa Papier ===
this teacher's teachers
Papier studied with teachers including Mathilde Marchesi.
- Anna von Mildenburg

=== Robert Papperitz ===
this teacher's teachers
Papperitz (1826–1903) studied with teachers including Moritz Hauptmann, Ignaz Moscheles, and Ernst Richter.
- Algernon Ashton
- Calvin Brainerd Cady
- Felix Draeseke
- Stephen Albert Emery
- John Comfort Fillmore
- W. O. Forsyth
- Gustave Gagnon
- Edvard Grieg [pupils]
- Basil Harwood
- Paul Homeyer [pupils]
- Iwan Knorr [pupils]
- David Maurice Levett
- Oskar Merikanto
- Smith Newell Penfield
- Ernst Perabo [pupils]
- Karl Piutti [pupils]
- Charles Villiers Stanford [pupils]
- Franklin Taylor [pupils]
- Augustus Stephen Vogt
- Richard Zeckwer

=== Pietro Domenico Paradies ===
- Gertrud Elisabeth Mara

=== Dorothy Parke ===
this teacher's teachers
Parke (1904–1990) studied with teachers including Paul Corder and Ambrose Coviello.
- Derek Bell
- Norma Burrowes
- Kenneth Montgomery

=== Horatio Parker ===
this teacher's teachers
Parker (1863–1919) studied with teachers including Josef Rheinberger.
- Seth Bingham
- Virginia Carrington-Thomas
- William Arms Fisher
- Charles Ives
- Edward Moore
- Quincy Porter [pupils]
- John Donald Robb
- Roger Sessions [pupils]

=== James Cutler Dunn Parker ===
- Arthur Battelle Whiting

=== Walter Parratt ===
this teacher's teachers
Parratt (1841–1924) studied with teachers including George Cooper.
- Basil Allchin [pupils]
- Herbert Brewer [pupils]
- Percy Buck [pupils]
- Walford Davies [pupils]
- Harold Darke [pupils]
- Norman Demuth
- Thomas Dunhill [pupils]
- Ernest Farrar [pupils]
- William Henry Harris [pupils]
- Henry Ley
- Hubert Stanley Middleton
- T. Tertius Noble
- Cyril Rootham [pupils]
- Heathcote Dicken Statham
- Howard Talbot
- Bryceson Treharne [pupils]

=== Hubert Parry ===
this teacher's teachers
Parry (1848–1918) studied with teachers including William Sterndale Bennett, Edward Dannreuther, George Elvey, George Alexander Macfarren, and Henry Hugo Pierson.
- Frank Bridge [pupils]
- Percy Buck [pupils]
- George Butterworth
- Harold Darke [pupils]
- Walford Davies [pupils]
- George Dyson [pupils]
- Cecil Forsyth
- Gustav Holst [pupils]
- John Ireland [pupils]
- Cyril Rootham [pupils]
- Bryceson Treharne [pupils]
- Ralph Vaughan Williams [pupils]
- Charles Wood [pupils]

=== Harry Partch ===
- Dean Drummond
- David Dunn
- Lee Hoiby
- Ben Johnston [pupils]
- Allen Strange
- James Tenney [pupils]

=== Bernardo Pasquini ===
this teacher's teachers
Pasquini (1637–1710) studied with teachers including Loreto Vittori.
- Francesco Durante [pupils]
- Tommaso Gaffi [pupils]
- Francesco Gasparini [pupils]
- Georg Muffat

=== Elizabeth Pastor ===
this teacher's teachers
Pastor studied with teachers including Boris Goldovsky.
- Jerod Impichchaachaaha' Tate

=== Paul Patterson ===
this teacher's teachers
Patterson studied with teachers including Richard Stoker and Richard Rodney Bennett.
- Geoffrey Álvarez
- Kit Armstrong
- Nimrod Borenstein
- Nigel Clarke
- Ailsa Dixon
- Andrew Gant
- Adam Gorb [pupils]
- Albert Garzia
- Sungji Hong
- John Jansson
- Odaline de la Martinez
- Roderick Watkins

=== Ernst Pauer ===
this teacher's teachers
Pauer (1826–1905) studied with teachers including Franz Xaver Wolfgang Mozart.
- Alfred Anderson
- William Carter
- Eugen d'Albert
- Emily Daymond
- Stephen Kemp
- Emma Mundella
- Bernhard Scholz [pupils]
- Charles Villiers Stanford [pupils]
- Bryceson Treharne [pupils]
- Edmund Hart Turpin
- Ernest Walker
- Agnes Zimmermann

=== Oscar Paul ===
this teacher's teachers
Paul (1836–1898) studied with teachers including Louis Plaidy, Ernst Richter, and Moritz Hauptmann.
- Theodore Baker
- Fanny Davies
- Cornelis Dopper
- Albert Fuchs [pupils]
- Alfred Hill
- Hans Huber
- Leoš Janáček [pupils]
- W. Waugh Lauder
- John Lund
- Ferdinand Pfohl
- Anna Diller Starbuck
- Felix Weingartner

=== Maggi Payne ===
this teacher's teachers
Payne (born 1945) studied with teachers including Robert Ashley, Ben Johnston, M. William Karlins, Salvatore Martirano, Gordon Mumma, and Alan Stout.
- Barbara Golden
- Eric Glick Rieman

=== František Martin Pecháček ===
this teacher's teachers
Pecháček (1763–1816) studied with teachers including Carl Ditters von Dittersdorf.
- Frederik Thorkildsen Wexschall [pupils]

=== Felip Pedrell ===
this teacher's teachers
Pedrell (1841-1922) studied with teachers including José Brocá.
- Isaac Albéniz
- Rosa García Ascot
- Manuel de Falla [pupils]
- Narcisa Freixas
- Roberto Gerhard [pupils]
- Enrique Granados [pupils]
- Joan Lamote de Grignon
- Lluís Millet [pupils]

=== Peter Pears ===
this teacher's teachers
Pears (1910-1986) studied with teachers including Dawson Freer, Elena Gerhardt, Clytie Hine, Lucie Manén, and Thérèse Behr-Schnabel.
- James Griffett
- Kevin McMillan

=== Frank Pelleg ===
- Stanley Babin
- Herbert Brün [pupils]
- Naomi Shemer

=== Romain-Octave Pelletier I ===
this teacher's teachers
Pelletier I (1843–1927) studied with teachers including George Cooper and Antoine François Marmontel.
- Albertine Caron-Legris
- Claude Champagne [pupils]
- Jean Deslauriers
- J.-J. Gagnier
- Henri Gagnon
- Alfred La Liberté
- Clarence Lucas
- Alfred Mignault
- Albertine Morin-Labrecque
- William Reed
- Amédée Tremblay

=== Petros Peloponnesios ===
- Peter the Byzantine [pupils]

=== Joseph Pembaur ===
this teacher's teachers
Pembaur studied with teachers including Anton Bruckner and Josef Rheinberger.
- Ludwig Thuille [pupils]

=== Krzysztof Penderecki ===
this teacher's teachers
Pendereck (1933–2020) studied with teachers including Franciszek Skołyszewski, Artur Malawski, and Stanisław Wiechowicz.
- Chester Biscardi [pupils]
- David Feldman
- Eduardo Frigatti
- Sean Hickey
- Cindy McTee

=== Johann Christoph Pepusch ===
this teacher's teachers
Pepusch (1667–1752) studied with teachers including Martin Klingenberg and Severus Grosse.
- John Bennett
- William Boyce [pupils]
- Benjamin Cooke [pupils]
- James Nares [pupils]
- John Stanley

=== Ernst Perabo ===
this teacher's teachers
Perabo (1845-1920) studied with teachers including Carl Reinecke, Ignaz Moscheles, Robert Papperitz, and Ernst Richter.
- Amy Beach

=== George Perle ===
this teacher's teachers
Perle (1915–2009) studied with teachers including Ernst Krenek.
- Paul Lansky [pupils]
- Bruce Saylor
- Bright Sheng
- Ye Xiaogang
- Moshe Zorman

=== Vlado Perlemuter ===
this teacher's teachers
Perlemuter (1904–2002) studied with teachers including Moritz Moszkowski, Alfred Cortot, and Maurice Ravel.
- Mireya Arboleda
- Michèle Boegner
- Michel Dalberto
- Melvyn Tan

=== Vincent Persichetti ===
this teacher's teachers
Persichetti (1915–1987) studied with teachers including Russel King Miller, Paul Nordoff, Fritz Reiner, and Olga Samaroff.
- Bruce Adolphe
- Leonardo Balada
- Leo Brouwer
- Richard Danielpour
- James DePreist
- Kenneth Fuchs
- Philip Glass
- Paavo Heininen
- Lowell Liebermann
- Hall Overton [pupils]
- Thomas Pasatieri
- Claire Polin
- Einojuhani Rautavaara
- Steve Reich
- Elena Ruehr
- Michael Jeffrey Shapiro
- Peter Schickele
- William Schimmel
- Laurie Spiegel
- Conrad Susa
- Robert William Witt
- Ramon Zupko

=== Louis Persinger ===
this teacher's teachers
Persinger (1887–1966) studied with teachers including Arthur Nikisch, Jacques Thibaud, and Eugène Ysaÿe.
- Guila Bustabo
- Arnold Eidus
- Fredell Lack
- Yehudi Menuhin [pupils]
- Sonya Monosoff [pupils]
- Ruggiero Ricci [pupils]
- Isaac Stern [pupils]
- Almita Vamos
- Camilla Wicks
- Zvi Zeitlin

=== Giacomo Antonio Perti ===
this teacher's teachers
Perti (1661–1756) studied with teachers including Giuseppe Corsi da Celano.
- Petronio Franceschini [pupils]
- Domenico Gabrielli [pupils]
- Giovanni Battista Martini [pupils]
- Giuseppe Torelli [pupils]

=== Giovanni Battista Pescetti ===
- Josef Mysliveček
- Antonio Salieri [pupils]

=== Émile Pessard ===
- Jacques Ibert
- Maurice Ravel [pupils]
- Jean Roger-Ducasse [pupils]

=== Peter the Byzantine ===
this teacher's teachers
Petros Byzantios (fl. 1770 – 1808) studied with teachers including Petros Peloponnesios.
- Chartophylax Chourmouzios

=== Goffredo Petrassi ===
this teacher's teachers
Petrassi (1904–2003) studied with teachers including Alessandro Bustini, Vincenzo di Donato, and Fernando Germani.
- Sven-Erik Bäck
- Robert Beaser
- Norma Beecroft
- Mario Bertoncini
- Cornelius Cardew [pupils]
- Aldo Clementi
- Peter Maxwell Davies [pupils]
- Michael Dellaira
- Franco Donatoni [pupils]
- Zsolt Durkó
- Will Eisma
- Richard Hillert
- Zoltán Jeney
- Karl Korte
- Nicola LeFanu [pupils]
- Kenneth Leighton
- Ennio Morricone
- Jorge Peixinho
- Daniel Perlongo [pupils]
- Ernesto Rubin de Cervin [pupils]
- Eric Salzman
- Alfredo Sangiorgi [pupils]
- Armando Santiago
- Józef Świder
- András Szőllősy
- Richard Teitelbaum

=== Egon Petri ===
this teacher's teachers
Petri (1881–1962) studied with teachers including Felix Draeseke and Hermann Kretzschmar.
- Victor Borge
- Joseph Brye
- Winifred Burston
- Balys Dvarionas
- Esther Gilodo
- Gordon Green
- Jan Hoffman
- Lee Hoiby
- Eugene Istomin
- Claire James
- Grant Johannesen
- Gunnar Johansen
- Alfred Kanwischer
- Emme Kemp
- Leonard Klein
- Xenia Boodberg Lee
- Ernst Levy
- Alexander Libermann
- Charles Lynch [pupils]
- Lois Maer
- Ozan Marsh
- Phillip Morgan
- John Moriarty
- Dimitar Nenov [pupils]
- John Ogdon
- Ruth Orr
- Newman Powell
- Ruth Preusser
- Alice Ray
- Alan Rawsthorne [pupils]
- Daniell Revenaugh
- Forrest Robinson
- Friedrich Schnapp
- Robert Sheldon
- Larry Sitsky
- Ruth Slenczynska
- Lucie Stern
- John Sweeney
- Vitya Vronsky
- Gordon Watson
- Julian White
- Earl Wild
- Terry Wohl

=== Vilém Petrželka ===
this teacher's teachers
Petrželka (1889–1967) studied with teachers including Karel Hoffmeister, Leoš Janáček, and Vítězslav Novák.
- Pavel Haas

=== Malcolm Peyton ===
this teacher's teachers
Peyton (born 1932) studied with teachers including Edward T. Cone.
- Lee Hyla [pupils]

=== Isidor Philipp ===
this teacher's teachers
Philipp (1863–1958) studied with teachers including Georges Mathias, Stephen Heller, Camille Saint-Saëns, and Théodore Ritter.
- Emma Boynet
- Harold Bradley
- John L. Buttrick
- Serge Conus
- Aaron Copland [pupils]
- Jeanne-Marie Darré
- Pierre Dervaux
- Ania Dorfmann
- Rolande Falcinelli [pupils]
- Felix Fox
- Jean Françaix
- Norman Fraser
- Henri Gagnon
- Noël Gallon [pupils]
- Youra Guller
- Georges Hugon
- Carol Klein
- Yvonne Loriod [pupils]
- Nikita Magaloff [pupils]
- Colin McPhee
- Federico Mompou
- Léo-Pol Morin
- Guiomar Novaes
- Wilfrid Pelletier
- Émile Poillot [pupils]
- Harrison Potter
- Albert Schweitzer
- Phyllis Sellick [pupils]
- Soulima Stravinsky
- Louise Talma
- Alexander Tcherepnin
- Paul Velucci
- Beveridge Webster
- Lūcija Garūta
- Victor Young

=== Burrill Phillips ===
this teacher's teachers
Phillips (1907–1988) studied with teachers including Howard Hanson, Bernard Rogers, and Edwin Stringham.
- Ben Johnston [pupils]
- Daria Semegen [pupils]

=== Niccolò Piccinni ===
this teacher's teachers
Piccinni (1728–1800) studied with teachers including Leonardo Leo and Francesco Durante.
- Domenico Cimarosa
- Gaspare Spontini

=== Gabriel Pierné ===
this teacher's teachers
Pierné (1863 - 1937) studied with teachers including Antoine François Marmontel, Albert Lavignac, Émile Durand, César Franck, and Jules Massenet.
- Antonio María Valencia

=== Henry Hugo Pierson ===
this teacher's teachers
Pierson (1815-1873) studied with teachers including Thomas Attwood, Arthur Thomas Corfe, Thomas Greatorex, Carl Gottlieb Reissiger, Johann Christian Rinck, Václav Tomášek, and Thomas Attwood Walmisley.
- Hubert Parry [pupils]

=== Willem Pijper ===
- Kees van Baaren [pupils]
- Piet Ketting
- Guillaume Landré

=== Pierre Pincemaille ===
this teacher's teachers
Pincemaille (1956–2018) studied with teachers including Rolande Falcinelli.
- David Cassan [pupils]
- Quentin Guerillot [pupils]
- Baptiste-Florian Marle-Ouvrard [pupils]

=== Ettore Pinelli ===
this teacher's teachers
Pinelli (1843–1915) studied with teachers including Joseph Joachim.
- Stanislao Falchi [pupils]
- Vincenzo Tommasini

=== Maria João Pires ===
- Alba Ventura

=== André Pirro ===
- Arthur Berger [pupils]
- Vladimir Fédorov
- Marc Pincherle
- Dragan Plamenac

=== Johann Georg Pisendel ===
this teacher's teachers
Pisendel (1687–1755) studied with teachers including Johann David Heinichen, Antonio Montanari, and Antonio Vivaldi.
- Franz Benda [pupils]
- Johann Gottlieb Graun

=== Paul Pisk ===
this teacher's teachers
Pisk (1893–1990) studied with teachers including Arnold Schoenberg.
- Samuel Adler [pupils]
- Gary Lee Nelson
- Leopold Spinner

=== Francesco Antonio Pistocchi ===
- Antonio Bernacchi [pupils]
- Annibale Pio Fabri

=== Walter Piston ===
this teacher's teachers
Piston (1894–1976) studied with teachers including Nadia Boulanger, Paul Dukas, and Edward Burlingame Hill.
- Samuel Adler [pupils]
- Leroy Anderson
- Arthur Berger [pupils]
- Leonard Bernstein [pupils]
- Martin Boykan [pupils]
- Elliott Carter [pupils]
- John Davison
- Irving Fine [pupils]
- Stefans Grové [pupils]
- John Harbison [pupils]
- Michael Horvit
- Karl Kohn [pupils]
- Ellis B. Kohs
- Gail Kubik
- Noël Lee
- Joel Mandelbaum
- Robert Moevs
- Conlon Nancarrow
- William P. Perry
- Daniel Pinkham
- Frederic Rzewski
- Allen Sapp
- Harold Shapero [pupils]
- Claudio Spies
- Robert Strassburg [pupils]
- Yehudi Wyner [pupils]

=== Thomas Pitfield ===
this teacher's teachers
Pitfield (1903–1999) studied with teachers including Eric Fogg, Carl Fuchs, Thomas Keighley, Frank Merrick, and Kathleen Moorhouse.
- David Ellis
- Robin Field
- John Golland
- John McCabe
- John Ogdon
- Philip Spratley
- Ronald Stevenson

=== Percy Pitt ===
this teacher's teachers
Pitt (1870–1932) studied with teachers including Salomon Jadassohn and Josef Rheinberger.
- Poldowski

=== Leopold Pittner ===
this teacher's teachers
Pittner (1687–1754) studied with teachers including Unknown .
- Johann Georg Albrechtsberger [pupils]

=== Friedrich Wilhelm Pixis ===
this teacher's teachers
Pixis (1786–1842) studied with teachers including Ignaz Fränzl and Giovanni Battista Viotti.
- Moritz Mildner [pupils]
- Johann Peter Pixis [pupils]

=== Johann Peter Pixis ===
this teacher's teachers
Pixis (1788–1874) studied with teachers including Johann Georg Albrechtsberger and Friedrich Wilhelm Pixis.
- Virginia Gabriel
- George Alexander Osborne

=== Ildebrando Pizzetti ===
- Mario Castelnuovo-Tedesco
- Franco Donatoni [pupils]
- Nicolas Flagello
- Manoah Leide-Tedesco
- Virgilio Mortari
- Gardner Read [pupils]
- Olga Rudge
- Amaury Veray [pupils]

=== Hans Pfitzner ===
this teacher's teachers
Pfitzner (1869–1949) studied with teachers including Iwan Knorr and James Kwast.
- Sem Dresden [pupils]
- Felix Wolfes

=== Louis Plaidy ===
this teacher's teachers
Plaidy (1810–1874) studied with teachers including Albrecht Agthe and Ludwig Haase.
- Horton Claridge Allison
- Dudley Buck [pupils]
- Hans von Bülow [pupils]
- Frederic Hymen Cowen
- Felix Draeseke
- John Farmer [pupils]
- Gustave Gagnon
- Edvard Grieg [pupils]
- Michael Maybrick
- Arthur O'Leary [pupils]
- James Cutler Dunn Parker
- Oscar Paul [pupils]
- Julius Röntgen
- Ernst Rudorff [pupils]
- Samuel Sanford
- Hermann Scholtz
- Gustav Schreck
- Arthur Sullivan [pupils]
- Franklin Taylor [pupils]
- Bruno Zwintscher

=== Nicolas-Joseph Platel ===
this teacher's teachers
Platel (1777–1835) studied with teachers including Jacques-Michel Hurel de Lamare.
- Alexandre Batta
- Adrien-François Servais

=== Simone Plé-Caussade ===
this teacher's teachers
Plé-Caussade (1897–1986) studied with teachers including Georges Caussade, Alfred Cortot, Henri Dallier, Maurice Emmanuel, and César-Abel Estyle.
- Gilbert Amy
- Rolande Falcinelli [pupils]
- Pierre Gabaye
- Jean Guillou
- Betsy Jolas
- Jean-Étienne Marie
- Bruce Mather
- Serge Nigg
- Tolia Nikiprowetzky
- Jean-Louis Petit
- Makoto Shinohara
- Georges-Émile Tanguay

=== Émile Poillot ===
this teacher's teachers
Poillot (1886–1948) studied with teachers including Isidor Philipp, Alexandre Guilmant, and Louis Vierne.
- Michel Chapuis

=== Larry Polansky ===
this teacher's teachers
Polansky (born 1954) studied with teachers including James Tenney.
- Gino Robair

=== Yuri Pomerantsiev ===
this teacher's teachers
Pomerantsiev studied with teachers including Sergei Taneyev.
- Sergei Prokofiev

=== Herb Pomeroy ===
- Toshiko Akiyoshi
- Franck Amsallem
- Alan Broadbent
- Gary Burton
- Duško Gojković
- Gary McFarland
- Mika Pohjola
- Jože Privšek
- Miroslav Vitouš

=== Amilcare Ponchielli ===
this teacher's teachers
Ponchielli (1834–1886) studied with teachers including Alberto Mazzucato.
- Marco Enrico Bossi [pupils]
- Caterina Gabrielli (perhaps)
- Vittorio Gianfreschi
- Pietro Mascagni
- Emilio Pizzi
- Giacomo Puccini [pupils]

=== Marcel Poot ===
this teacher's teachers
Poot (1901–1988) studied with teachers including Arthur De Greef, Paul Dukas, Paul Gilson, Martin Lunssens, Lodewijk Mortelmans, and José Sevenans.
- Willem Kersters [pupils]

=== David Popper ===
this teacher's teachers
Popper (1843–1913) studied with teachers including Julius Goltermann.
- Arnold Főldesy
- Ludwig Lebell
- Adolf Schiffer [pupils]

=== Nicola Porpora ===
this teacher's teachers
Porpora (1686–1768) studied with teachers including Gaetano Greco.
- Caffarelli
- Matteo Capranica
- Farinelli
- Johann Adolph Hasse [pupils]
- Joseph Haydn [pupils]
- Duchess Maria Antonia of Bavaria
- Marianna Martines
- Venanzio Rauzzini [pupils]
- Vittoria Tesi
- Tommaso Traetta [pupils]
- Antonio Uberti

=== Costanzo Porta ===
this teacher's teachers
Porta (1528 or 1529 – 1601) studied with teachers including Adrian Willaert.
- Ludovico Balbi
- Lodovico Grossi da Viadana

=== Quincy Porter ===
this teacher's teachers
Porter (1897–1966) studied with teachers including Ernest Bloch and Horatio Parker.
- Maurice Blackburn
- Peggy Stuart Coolidge
- Paul Fetler [pupils]
- Michael Horvit
- Donald Keats [pupils]
- Alvin Lucier [pupils]
- Ezra Sims

=== John Samuel Charles Possin ===
this teacher's teachers
Possin (1753-) studied with teachers including Johann Abraham Peter Schulz.
- Stephen Francis Rimbault [pupils]

=== Cipriani Potter ===
this teacher's teachers
Potter (1792-1871) studied with teachers including Thomas Attwood, William Crotch, and Joseph Woelfl.
- Henry Charles Banister
- Laura Wilson Barker
- Joseph Barnby [pupils]
- William Sterndale Bennett [pupils]
- William Cusins [pupils]
- William Henry Holmes [pupils]
- Arthur O'Leary [pupils]
- Edward Collett May
- Henry Wylde

=== Francis Poulenc ===
this teacher's teachers
Poulenc (1899–1963) studied with teachers including Charles Koechlin and Erik Satie.
- Jacques Leguerney

=== Henri Pousseur ===
- David Behrman [pupils]
- Philippe Boesmans
- Jonathan Lloyd (composer)
- Gilberto Mendes

=== Lloyd Powell ===
- Isador Goodman
- Alec Templeton

=== Mel Powell ===
this teacher's teachers
Powell (1923–1998) studied with teachers including Paul Hindemith, Nadia Reisenberg, Joseph Schillinger, Ernst Toch, and Bernard Wagenaar.
- Justin Connolly
- Brian Evans
- John Ferritto
- Walter Hekster
- Eleanor Hovda
- Arturo Marquez
- Lewis Spratlan
- John Stewart
- Lois V. Vierk

=== Louis-Barthélémy Pradher ===
this teacher's teachers
Pradher (1782–1843) studied with teachers including Henri-Montan Berton.
- Henri Herz [pupils]
- Jacques-Simon Herz
- Henri Rosellen

=== Jacob Praetorius ===
this teacher's teachers
Praetorius (1586–1651) studied with teachers including Jan Pieterszoon Sweelinck and Jacob Praetorius the Elder.
- Johann Mattheson
- Matthias Weckmann

=== Jacob Praetorius the Elder ===
- Hieronymus Praetorius

=== Eddie Prévost ===
- Gino Robair

=== Gottfried von Preyer ===
this teacher's teachers
Preyer (1807–1901) studied with teachers including Simon Sechter.
- Carl Mayrberger
- Hans Schläger

=== Humphrey Procter-Gregg ===
this teacher's teachers
Procter-Gregg (1895–1980) studied with teachers including Charles Villiers Stanford, Charles Wood, and Julius Harrison.
- Harrison Birtwistle [pupils]
- Peter Maxwell Davies [pupils]
- Alexander Goehr [pupils]
- Peter Hope
- Elgar Howarth
- John McCabe
- John Ogdon
- Ernest Tomlinson
- David Wilde

=== Ignazio Prota ===
- Matteo Capranica
- Niccolò Jommelli [pupils]

=== Ebenezer Prout ===
this teacher's teachers
Prout (1835–1909) studied with teachers including Charles Kensington Salaman.
- Eugen d'Albert
- Ethel Barns
- Leonard Butler
- Dora Bright
- Frederic Cliffe [pupils]
- Edward German
- Percy Godfrey
- John Locke Gray
- Stanley Hawley
- Battison Haynes [pupils]
- Alicia Adélaide Needham
- Tobias Matthay [pupils]
- John Blackwood McEwen [pupils]
- Charles William Pearce
- Herbert Sharpe [pupils]
- Arthur Goring Thomas
- John Waterhouse
- Henry Wood [pupils]

=== Francesco Provenzale ===
this teacher's teachers
Provenzale (1632–1704) studied with teachers including Erasmo Bartolo and Giovanni Salvatore.
- Nicola Fago [pupils]
- Nicolo Grimaldi
- Leonardo Leo [pupils]
- Gaetano Veneziano

=== François Prume ===
this teacher's teachers
Prume (1816–1849) studied with teachers including François Habeneck.
- Jacques Dupuis [pupils]
- Frantz Jehin-Prume [pupils]
- Hubert Léonard [pupils]

=== Giacomo Puccini ===
this teacher's teachers
Puccini (1858–1924) studied with teachers including Antonio Bazzini and Amilcare Ponchielli.
- Erwin Lendvai

=== Gaetano Pugnani ===
this teacher's teachers
Pugnani (1731–1798) studied with teachers including Giovanni Battista Somis.
- Luigi Borghi
- Antonio Bartolomeo Bruni
- Charles Michael Alexis Sola
- Giovanni Battista Viotti [pupils]

=== Raoul Pugno ===
this teacher's teachers
Pugno (1852–1914) studied with teachers including Georges Mathias and Ambroise Thomas.
- Ernst Levy

=== Vladimir Pukhal'ski ===
this teacher's teachers
Pukhal'ski (1848–1933) studied with teachers including Theodor Leschetizky.
- Alexander Brailowsky

=== Henry Purcell ===
this teacher's teachers
Purcell (1659–1695) studied with teachers including John Blow, Henry Cooke, Christopher Gibbons, and Pelham Humfrey.
- Daniel Roseingrave [pupils]
- John Weldon

=== Veli-Matti Puumala ===
- Sampo Haapamäki
- Sebastian Hilli
- Anna Huuskonen
- Seunghee Lee
- Minna Leinonen
- Jimmy López
- Tiina Myllärinen
- Timothy Page
- Jüri Reinvere
- Gundega Šmite
- Lauri Supponen
- Outi Tarkiainen
- Niilo Tarnanen
- Juhani Vesikkala

=== Johann Christoph Pyrlaeus ===
- John Antes

== Q ==
=== Johann Joachim Quantz ===
this teacher's teachers
Quantz (1697–1773) studied with teachers including Johann Joseph Fux, Francesco Gasparini, and Jan Dismas Zelenka.
- Johann Friedrich Agricola
- Frederick II
- Christoph Nichelmann

=== Michael Quarry ===
this teacher's teachers
Quarry (1840–1906) studied with teachers including Ignaz Moscheles.
- Charles Villiers Stanford [pupils]

=== Héctor Quintanar ===
- Mario Lavista [pupils]
