= Perabo =

Perabo is a surname. Notable people with the surname include:

- Ernst Perabo (1845–1920), German-born American composer, pianist, and music teacher
- Piper Perabo (born 1976), American actress
