= Robert Papperitz =

German music educator, composer, and organist

- Born: Benjamin Robert Papperitz; December 4, 1826; Pirna, Kingdom of Saxony
- Died: September 29, 1903 (aged 76) Leipzig, German Empire
- Education: Leipzig Conservatory
- Occupations: Music educator; Composer; Organist
- Instruments: Organ; Piano

Benjamin Robert Papperitz (4 December 1826 – 29 September 1903) was a prominent German music educator, composer, and organist who served on the faculty of the Leipzig Conservatory for over fifty years. He was highly regarded for his instruction in harmony, counterpoint, and organ, training an influential generation of international composers and performers.

== Biography ==
Papperitz was born in Pirna, Saxony, on 4 December 1826. He initially pursued academic interests, such as philology and philosophy, while training to become a schoolteacher at a local seminary before shifting his career path to music. In 1848, at the age of 22, he enrolled at the Leipzig Conservatory, where he completed his studies under Moritz Hauptmann, Ernst Friedrich Richter, and Ignaz Moscheles.

Due to his academic success, the Leipzig Conservatory invited him to join its faculty immediately upon his graduation in 1851, where he taught harmony and counterpoint until 1902.

In 1868, he succeeded his former teacher Richter as the titular organist of St. Nicholas Church, Leipzig (Nikolaikirche), a post he occupied until 1899.

Papperitz died in Leipzig on 29 September 1903 at the age of 76.

== Notable students ==
During his half-century on the faculty of the Leipzig Conservatory, Papperitz trained an influential, international generation of musicians, educators, and composers. Among his European students was Edvard Grieg, who later recalled that Papperitz granted him "freer rein" than other instructors, encouraging the integration of chromatic voice leading into his chorale harmonisations. The Irish-born composer Charles Villiers Stanford travelled to Leipzig to study advanced piano under Papperitz between 1874 and 1875. Other notable European pupils included British composer Algernon Ashton, English pedagogue Franklin Taylor, Finnish opera pioneer Oskar Merikanto, and German concert organist Paul Homeyer, who eventually joined Papperitz on the conservatory's faculty.

Papperitz also instructed a significant number of pioneering musicians from North America. His American students included prominent music theorists and educators Stephen A. Emery, John Comfort Fillmore, and Albert Ross Parsons, as well as organists Smith Newell Penfield and Fenelon B. Rice. He also taught pianists Ernst Perabo, David Maurice Levett, Richard Zeckwer, and composer-pianist Louis Maas. His Canadian students included composer W. O. Forsyth, organist Gustave Gagnon, and Augustus Stephen Vogt, the founder of the Toronto Mendelssohn Choir.

== Compositions ==
Papperitz composed a variety of sacred choral works, solo lieder, and pieces for keyboard and organ. Many of his works were published in Leipzig by prominent houses such as Breitkopf & Härtel and C.F. Kahnt.

His notable publications include:

- Choral-Studien für die Orgel (Chorale Studies for Organ), Op. 15
- Sechs Choralstudien für die Orgel (Six Chorale Studies for Organ), Op. 16
- Choralstudien für die Orgel (Chorale Studies for Organ), Op. 17
- Sechs Lieder für eine Mezzo-Sopranstimme mit Begleitung des Pianoforte (Six Songs for Mezzo-Soprano Voice with Piano Accompaniment), Op. 19
- Lieder am Pianoforte, (Songs for Piano and Voice), Book 4 [c. 1865]
