= Adolf Ruthardt =

German piano teacher, composer and music editor

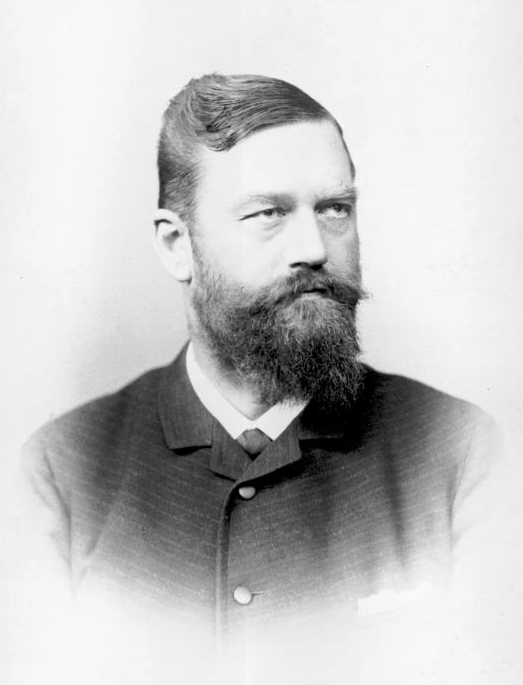
Adolf Ruthardt

Adolf Ruthardt (9 February 1849 – 12 September 1934) was a German piano teacher, composer and music editor.

Adolf Ruthardt was the son of the oboist Friedrich Ruthardt and the younger brother of Julius Ruthardt. After studying music at the Stuttgart Conservatory he moved to Geneva in 1868, working as a pianist and teacher. From 1885 he taught piano at the Leipzig Conservatory, becoming professor there in 1910.

== Works ==
- Das Klavier, 1880
