= Friedrich Ruthardt =

Friedrich Ruthardt (/ˈrʊˌtɑːrt/; 9 December 1802 – 23 May 1862) was a German oboist and composer. He was born in Stuttgart as the son of an oboist in the chapel of the king of Württemberg. He became cantor of the main church of this city. He played in the Stuttgart court orchestra (probably the Hofkapelle Stuttgart), and composed chorales as well as pieces for the oboe and the zither. Fétis claimed that Ruthardt was one of the most skillful players of the latter instrument in Germany. One of the best-known 19th-century oboe concertos, by Bernhard Molique, was likely written for Ruthardt, and first performed at Stuttgart in 1829.

Two of his sons were also musicians: Julius Ruthardt (1841–1909), a violinist; and Adolf Ruthardt (1849–1934), a music teacher and composer.

== Publications ==
=== Chorales ===
- Choralmelodien des Würtembergischen Gesangbuchs in zwei Heften; Stuttgart, G.A. Zumsteeg, 1841
  - Heft No. 1: 12 Mélodies chorales du livre de chant du royaume de Wurtemberg, avec accompagnement de guitare
  - Heft No. 2: 13 Mélodies chorales etc.

=== For zither ===
- Gründliche Anleitung die Zither spielen zu lernen. Nebst 50 Uebungestücken in fortschreitender Ordnung und mit angemerktem Fingersatze; Stuttgart, Wagner, 1844.
- Sammlung ausgewählter Opern-Melodien, Gebirgs- und Volkslieder für Zither, als Anhang zu dessen Zitherschule. Lief. 1, 2; Stuttgart, Ebner, February 1850
- Sammlung ausgewählter Opern-Melodien, Gebirgs- und Volkslieder sowohl für die 18saitige, als auch für die 28saitige Zither einger. Lief. 3; Tübingen, Osiander, March 1855
- Schule für Hand-Harmonika. Leichtfassliche Anleitung, dieses Instrument durch Selbstunterricht nach musikal. Regeln, in kurzer Zeit rein und gründlich spielen zu lernen. qu.-8; Stuttgart, Ebner, November 1862
