= Peter Hope (composer) =

British composer and arranger (born 1930)

Peter Hope (born 2 November 1930) is a British composer and arranger. He is particularly noted for his light music compositions, such as the Ring of Kerry Suite, which won an Ivor Novello award, and for his arrangements, such as "Mexican Hat Dance". He has also written a Recorder Concerto and arranged music for the 2003 Spanish royal wedding, as well as Jessye Norman and José Carreras. He is sometimes credited as William Gardner.

== Career ==
Born in Edgeley, Stockport, Hope spent a lot of time at the cinema during his childhood, absorbing the musical scores, and began learning piano at the age of thirteen. One of his teachers was Dora Gilson, on the staff of the Royal Manchester College of Music. He began composing while still at school. From 1949 he studied music at Manchester University under Humphrey Procter-Gregg (1895-1980) and Maurice Aitchison. His time there overlapped with Peter Maxwell-Davies and Elgar Howarth, who joined in 1952.

With help from mentor Ernest Tomlinson, who Hope met while at Manchester, he gained employment at Mills Music in London as a copyist and arranger, where he stayed until 1954. He began providing regular arrangements for the BBC Concert Orchestra, using a lot of his own invention around the basic thematic material. This led to the commissioning of his first original work to gain attention: the three movement Momentum Suite for string orchestra (1959). Others followed, including the Ring of Kerry Suite, in 1961, Four French Dances (1968) and the orchestral showpiece Kaleidoscope (1970).

The 1950s and 1960s were the heyday of British light music, and Hope's music received regular broadcasts until the early 1970s when the musical climate in the UK changed dramatically. Hope gradually rebuilt his career as an arranger for Dutch television and German radio, and in 1979 gained huge commercial success and a lasting commercial career through his arrangements for An Album of Tosti Songs with Jose Carreras and its many follow-ups. He also had major success in Spain working as an arranger with Nacho Cano, starting with the album Un mundo separado por el mismo Dios (1994). This led to commissions to arrange the wedding music for Prince Felipe of Spain in 2004 and the Spanish Olympic bid in 2012.

Hope became co-chairman (with Anthony Hedges) of the Composers Guild of Great Britain in 1971 and retained his interest in original composition. From 2000 new works began to appear again, including the Bassoon Concertino (2000), two large scale cantatas - Along the Shore (2005) and The Song of Solomon - and a series of sonatas for wind instruments.

== Works ==
=== Orchestral ===
- Momentum: suite for string orchestra (1959)
- Scaramouche, ouverture (1967)
- Four French Dances (1968)
- Kaleidoscope (1969/70)
- The Ring of Kerry, suite (1961)
- Irish Legend, suite (1967)
- Playful Scherzo (1962/3)
- Petit Point (1962)
- Champagne Festival (1981)
- Speedbird Salutes the Few, march commissioned by British Airways. (1990)
- Concerto for Trumpet and orchestra (1952)
- Concertino for Bassoon Strings, Harp and Percussion (2000)
- Concerto (Birthday Concerto) for Recorder, Strings, Harp and Percussion (2003)

=== Orchestral arrangements ===
- Three American Sketches
  1. Marching Through Georgia
  2. Black is the Colour of my True Loves Hair
  3. Camptown Races
- Cantos Canarias
- Cielito Lindo
- Cockles and Mussels
- La Cucaracha
- Hollywood Concerto (for Rostal and Schaefer) 2 pianos and orchestra
- The Lark in the Clear Air
- Majorcan Fantasy
- Mexican Hat Dance
- O Waly Waly
- Waltzes of Offenbach
- Several Christmas carols

=== Chamber music ===
- Divertimento for guitar and string trio (2002)
- Serenade for violin viola and cello (2005)
- Bramall Hall Dances for recorder and guitar (2003) (alternative versions for recorder and piano, and recorder cello and harpsichord)
- Four Sketches, for oboe bassoon and piano (2003) (Emerson)
- Overture to "The Rivals", for recorder, bassoon and harpsichord (or piano) (2004)
- Sonata for Oboe and Piano (2009)
- Sonata for Bassoon and Piano (2014)
- Sonata for Clarinet and Piano (2015)
- Sonata for Recorder and Piano (2015)

=== Vocal music ===
- Beaminster – song for low voice and piano (2005)
- A Herrick Garland, for Countertenor, recorder, cello and harpsichord (2004)
- Along The Shore, cantata for Soprano, Choir and Orchestra (2005)

=== Incidental music ===
- "Chips Comic" two series of children's programmes for Channel 4 (with Juliet Lawson)
- Gala Concert Hall – signature tune for BBC radio programme of the same name
- Newsroom 1 for the BBC 1 television news (1969 to the early eighties)
- The Rivals (RADA production, 2004).
