= Simone Plé-Caussade =

French composer (1897–1986)

Simone-Marie Plé-Caussade (14 August 1897, Paris – 6 August 1986, Bagnères-de-Bigorre) was a French music pedagogue, composer and pianist. She wrote mainly works for solo piano and organ in addition to choral works, songs, chamber music, and sacred music. She notably published two volumes of piano music for children.

Plé-Caussade was married to composer Georges Caussade, 24 years her senior, who had been one of her teachers at the Conservatoire de Paris. Her other professors at the conservatoire included Alfred Cortot and Henri Dallier. She succeeded her husband as professor of fugue at the Paris Conservatoire in 1928.

Her notable students included Gilbert Amy, Marc Bleuse, Antoine Bouchard, Herbert de Castro, Monic Cecconi-Botella, Pierre Gabaye, Jean Guillou, Betsy Jolas, Noël Lancien, Jean-Etienne Marie, Bruce Mather, Serge Nigg, Tolia Nikiprowetzky, Jean-Louis Petit, Makoto Shinohara, Georges-Émile Tanguay, and Serge Gut. See: List of music students by teacher: N to Q#Simone Plé-Caussade.
