= W. O. Forsyth =

Canadian composer

Wesley Octavius Forsyth
- Born: 26 January 1859; Markham, Canada West
- Died: 7 May 1937 (aged 78); Toronto, Canada
- Occupations: Author, Composer

Wesley Octavius Forsyth (January 26, 1859 – May 7, 1937) was a Canadian pianist, composer and music educator based in Toronto, Ontario. Most of his compositions were written for the piano and voice.

== Early life and education ==
Forsyth was born in Markham Township, York County, Canada West. As a child Forsyth studied piano with Edward Fisher (musician). As a young man he studied at the University of Music and Theatre Leipzig with Salomon Jadassohn (composition, harmony, counterpoint, canon, and fugue), Martin Krause (piano), Gustav Schreck (composition), Paul Klengel (composition), Richard Hofmann (composer) (orchestration), Robert Papperitz, Bruno Zwintscher, (piano) and Adolf Ruthardt,(piano).

== Career ==
While studying in Leipzing, Forsyth wrote articles for Toronto's The Musical Courier, and created his first successful composition, "Romanza", as part of his Suite in E minor, in 1888. The piece was performed in Leipzig that year by a military orchestra. He made his debut that year as a solo pianist, but did not achieve success as an instrumental performer, and returned to Toronto to teach. In 1892 he travelled to Vienna and Ischl to study with Julius Epstein In 1893 he was the director of Toronto's Metropolitan College of Music, later renamed Metropolitan School of Music.

In the 1890s he wrote music reviews and other articles for the publications The Musician and The Week.

By 1913 his compositions had been published internationally, and he continued to produce a large volume of work after World War I. By 1923, his pupils had formed a "Forsyth Club", and a number of his works were performed on the radio.

A collection of Forsyth's papers and other documents about his life are preserved at the National Library of Canada.

== Select works ==
- "Love took me softly by the hand" : op. 30, no. 2
- "Showers are falling"
- "The homelight"
- Prelude and fugue : no. 1 in C minor : for the organ", op. 18
- "No. 2 : Song of the silver night (romance)"
- 'Frülingsabend = Spring evening : Alt oder Mezzo-Sopran mit Pianofortebegleitung", op. 16, no. 2
- "Through enchanting meadows", op. 54
