= Jani Christou =

Greek composer

Jani Christou (Greek: Γιάννης Χρήστου, Giánnīs Chrī́stou; 8 or 9 January 1926 – 8 January 1970) was a Greek composer.

== Biography ==
There is some disagreement about Christou's birth, the date of which is given by some authorities as 8 January; while others state 9 January. Most sources agree that he was born in Heliopolis, Egypt, though one states he was born in Alexandria, and it has recently been reported that a birth certificate has been found stating that the composer was born in Nicosia, Cyprus, though this certificate is suspected of being a forgery. His parents were Eleutherios Christou, a Greek industrialist and chocolate manufacturer, and Lilika Tavernari, of Cypriot origin. He was educated at the English School in Alexandria and he took his first piano lessons from various teachers and from the important Greek pianist Gina Bachauer. In 1948 he gained an MA in philosophy after having studied with Ludwig Wittgenstein and Bertrand Russell in King's College, Cambridge.

During that time he also studied music with Hans Redlich (then living at Letchworth) and in 1949 travelled to Rome to study orchestration with Angelo Francesco Lavagnino. He briefly attended lectures by Carl Jung in Zurich. In 1951 he returned to Alexandria where he married Theresia Horemi in 1961. He died on or the day before his 44th birthday in a car accident in Athens, Greece.

== Main works ==
- Phoenix Music (for orchestra) – 1949
- Symphony No. 1 – 1949–50
- Latin Liturgy – 1953
- Six T. S. Eliot Songs (for piano or orchestra and mezzo-soprano) – 1955 (piano) / 1957 (orch.)
- Symphony No. 2 – 1957–58
- Toccata for piano and orchestra – 1962
- Tongues of Fire (a Pentecost oratorio) – 1964
- Persians (Incidental music for Aeschylus' drama) – 1965
- Agamemnon – 1965
- Enantiodromia – 1965–68
- The Frogs – 1966
- Mysterion (for orchestra, tape, choir and soloists) – 1965–66
- Praxis for 12 (for 11 string instruments and director-pianist) – 1966
- Anaparastasis I (The Baritone) – 1968
- Anaparastasis III (The Pianist) – 1968
- Oedipus Rex – 1969
- Oresteia (unfinished) – 1967–70
