= Robin Field =

British composer (1935–2024)

Robin Field (16 September 1935 – 11 April 2024) was a British composer, a member of the Lakeland Composers group that also includes Arthur Butterworth, Gary Higginson and David Jennings.

Born in Redditch, Worcestershire, Field received early tuition from Hugh Allen in Worcester, then studied with James Murray Brown in London and Durham, and Thomas Pitfield in Manchester. Field combined his compositional activity with a full time career as an industrial chemist. He moved to the Lake District in 1962.

His worklist of over 160 compositions includes a Violin Concerto, an Oboe Concerto, the Fantasia Concertante on a Theme of Guillaume de Machaut for oboe and strings (North West Arts Award, 1971), eight string quartets, three piano sonatas, choral music (such as O Magnum Mysterium, for mixed chorus and organ) and songs. Among the songs are several cycles, such as When I Was One and Twenty (Housman) and A Sudden Revelation (Kenneth Steven).

== =External links ==
- Robin Field website
- List of works by category
- Robin Field plays A Song of Hope in 2019
