= Jeannine Richer =

French composer and music educator (1924–2022)

Jeannine Paulette Albertine Richer (6 June 1924 – 18 August 2022) was a French composer and music educator who taught music theory and published four books before she began composing.

Richer was born in Caudebec-en-Caux, France. She studied at the Paris Conservatory and the International Center of Music Research. Her teachers included Max Deutsch, Jean Etienne Marie, and Arnold Schoenberg. After she graduated, Richer taught music theory in Paris at the Ecole Normale de Musique until 1972.

Richer's works were published by Chappell & Co., Editions Musicales Transatlantiques, Furore-Verlag, G. Billaudot, Henry Lemoine, and M. Eschig. They included:

== Books ==
- 1962 – 60 Dictées: Très Faciles et Faciles
- 1962 – 65 Dictées: Faciles et de Moyenne Force
- 1969 – Cinquante Dictées Musicales
- 1958 – Vingt et une Leçons de Solfège

== Compositions ==
=== Chamber ===
- 3e Recueil d'Oeuvres, for string bass and piano
- Alchimies, for two violins
- Alpha Beta Gamma, for two Celtic harps
- Darissimo, for oboe
- En ce Temps-la, for 12 guitars
- La Guitar Contemporaine
- Le Lointain Trottoir d’en Face, for brass quintet
- Ligne Interrompue, for string bass
- Memoire, for piano, violin, and cello
- Piece, for flute
- Piege VI, for guitar
- Quartet for Saxophones
- Quartet for Trombones
- Rite, for 20 guitars
- Rives, for guitar
- String Bass Quartet
- Undecim, for brass ensemble

=== Electronic ===
- Le Crane (biblical text)
- Oiseaux Foux

=== Opera ===
- Parade Cruelle

=== Orchestra ===
- Confrontation
- Periodes, for oboe and string orchestra

=== Organ/Piano ===
- Delta V
- Entrechoquements et Zones Silencieuses
- Hantise
- Miniatures
- Musiquemobile
- Orgue 88 Mineral Fragment I (organ)
- Sonorite
- Tremblements/Derapages
- Triangle, for two pianos

=== Theatre ===
- Les Portes du Chemin

=== Vocal ===
- Anonymes, for large chorus and ten instruments
- Vocal, for a capella chorus
