= Gary Higginson =

British composer

Gary Higginson (born 1952) is a British composer. Higginson trained at the Guildhall School of Music and Drama under Edmund Rubbra, Patric Standford, Buxton Orr and Alfred Nieman, and then at Birmingham University under John Joubert. He is a member of the Lakeland Composers group that also includes Arthur Butterworth, Robin Field and David Jennings. He is a regular contributor of reviews to MusicWeb International.

Higginson has written over 200 pieces, including choral and orchestral works (such as The Stations of the Cross, op. 50), two operas for young people, five string quartets, song cycles (such as Messages of Hope, op. 87, a 22 minute setting of various poems for piano, soprano, tenor and baritone) and many solo sonatas and songs. He also composes brass band and educational music. His two sets of William Blake settings, Songs of Innocence and Experience, (op. 33, 1977 and op. 55, 1979-82) have been recorded. The Theme and Eight Variations for Solo Piano (1972, revised 2025), is published by Fand Music Press.
