= Serge Gut =

French musicologist

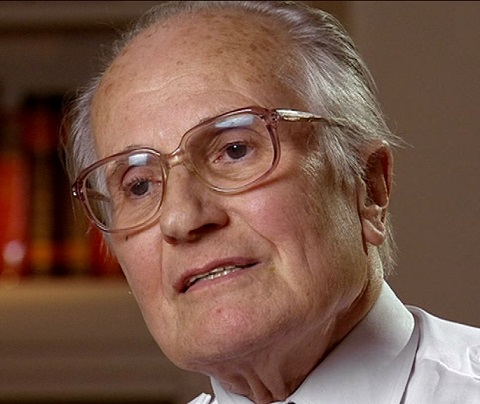
- Serge Gut (Franz Liszt, der Unvollendete, documentary by Ute Gebhardt, Mitteldeutscher Rundfunk, 2010)
- Born: 25 June 1927; Basel Switzerland
- Died: 31 March 2014 (aged 86); Suresnes
- Education: Sorbonne; Conservatoire de Paris
- Occupations: Classical composer; Musicologist

Serge Gut (25 June 1927 – 31 March 2014 on ResMusica) was a French musicologist of Swiss origin.

== Biography ==
A pupil of Simone Plé-Caussade, Tony Aubin and Olivier Messiaen at the Conservatoire de Paris, of Solange Corbin and Jacques Chailley at the Sorbonne, emeritus professor at the Paris-Sorbonne a composer, Serge Gut was a specialist of Franz Liszt. He was also a great specialist in German and French music of the 19th and early 20th century, the theory of musical language and its evolution.

== Selected publications ==
- 1967: La tierce harmonique dans la musique occidentale.
- 1989: Franz Liszt (Fallois, l'Âge d'homme, 1989, translated into German and expanded in 2009.
- 1975: Franz Liszt : les éléments du langage musical. (Klinsksieck, 1975, reissued in a revised and expanded version in 2008 at Éditions Aug. Zurfluh)
- 1993: Correspondence Liszt-d'Agoult (Fayard)
- 1994: Aspects du Lied romantique allemand. (Actes Sud)
- 1998: Collection of articles Musicologie au fil des siècles (PUPS), which is the tribute of Paris-Sorbonne University to the person who directed the UFR in music and musicology from 1983 to 1990.
- 2014: Tristan et Isolde, Fayard, Paris, ISBN 978-2-213-68113-9.
- 2018: Les principes fondamentaux de la musique occidentale, Beauchesne, Paris, ISBN 978-2-7010-2238-3.
