= Zygmunt Noskowski =

Polish composer, conductor and teacher

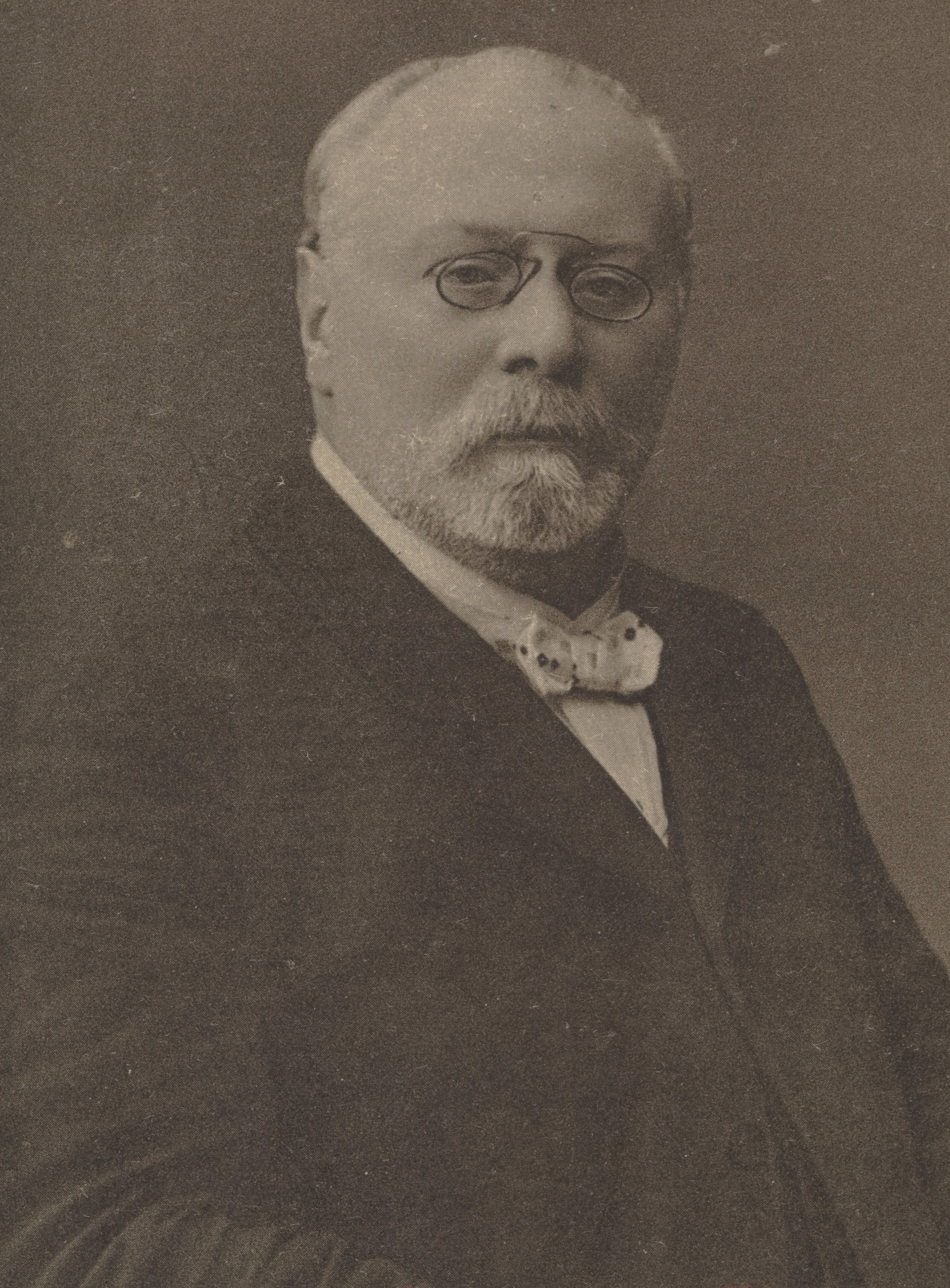
Zygmunt Noskowski

Zygmunt Noskowski (2 May 1846 – 23 July 1909) was a Polish composer, conductor, and teacher.

== Biography ==
Noskowski was born in Warsaw and was originally trained at the Warsaw Conservatory studying violin and composition with Stanisław Moniuszko, graduated with distinction in 1867. A scholarship enabled him to travel to Berlin where between 1872 and 1875, he studied with Friedrich Kiel, one of Europe’s leading teachers of composition. After holding several positions - kapellmeister and conductor of the Bodan Choral Society in Konstanz, Noskowski returned to Warsaw in 1880 where he remained for the rest of his life, professor of composition at the Warsaw Conservatory and conductor of Warsaw Society of Friends and the Warsaw Philharmonic (1905-1908).

He worked not only as a composer, but also became a famous teacher, a prominent conductor and a journalist. He was one of the leading figures in Polish music during the late 19th century and the first decade of the 20th. He taught virtually all of the important Polish composers of the next generation, including Karol Szymanowski and Grzegorz Fitelberg. See: List of music students by teacher: N to Q#Zygmunt Noskowski. He served as head of the Warsaw Music Society from 1880 to 1902 and was considered Poland’s leading composer during the last decade of his life. He died in Warsaw.

While Noskowski is best known for his orchestral compositions, he composed opera, chamber music, instrumental sonatas and vocal works of importance. Discussing Noskowski's chamber music, the famous critic and scholar Wilhelm Altmann wrote that it was "very effective and deserving of public attention and performance." Judging from the piano quartet written in 1879, one can hear that Noskowski had assimilated the recent musical developments taking place in Central Europe but the music, other than structurally, shows little or no influence of any of the major composers of the time, such as Brahms, Liszt, or Wagner, who were then dominating the scene.

== Selected works ==
- Symphony No. 1 in A major (1874–75)
- String Quartet, Op. 9 (1875)
- Morskie Oko, Concert Overture for Orchestra, Op. 19 (1879)
- Symphony No. 2 in C minor, "Elegiac" (1875–79)
- Fantasy for String Quartet (1879)
- Piano Quartet in D minor, Op. 8 (1880)
- Polonaise élegiaque in E minor, orchestra, Op. 22 No. 3 (1885)
- The Steppe, symphonic poem, Op. 66 (1895)
- Marche funèbre, Op. 53, orchestra (1897)
- Livia Quintilla, opera (1898)
- Symphonic Variations on Chopin's Prelude in A, Op. 28/7, subtitled "From the Life of a Nation" (1901)
- Symphony No. 3 in F major, "From Spring to Spring" (1903)
- Wyrok (The Judgment), opera (1906)
- Zemsta za mur graniczny (Revenge for the Boundary Wall), opera based on a play by Aleksander Fredro (1902–08)

== Recordings ==
- 2008 : Piano Works vol. 1 - Acte Préalable AP0188 - Valentina Seferinova: Impressions Op. 29; 3 Pieces Op. 35; Moments Melodiques Op. 36: Contes Op. 37; Feuille de Trefle Op. 44
- 2015 : Piano Works vol. 2 - Acte Préalable AP0355 - Anna Mikolon : Craoviennes op. 2, Polnisches Wiegenlied op. 11, Les sentiments op. 14, Aquarelles op. 20, En pastel op. 30
- 2017 : Piano Works vol. 3 - Acte Préalable AP0382 - Anna Mikolon: Images op. 27, Danses polonaises op. 23 a & 23 b, 3 Cracoviennes op. 5, 3 Morceaux op. 22, 3 Morceaux op. 26, 2 Morceaux op. 15
- 2018 : Piano Works vol. 4 - Acte Préalable AP0415 - Anna Mikolon, Anna Liszewska: Cracoviennes op. 7, Danses masoviennes op. 38, Six Polonaises op. 42
- 2009 : Chamber Works vol. 1 - Acte Préalable AP0234 - Four Strings Quartet: String Quartets Nos. 1 & 2
- 2013 : Chamber Works vol. 2 - Acte Préalable AP0235 - Four Strings Quartet: String Quartet No. 3, Variations on a theme by Viotti, Humorous Quartet, Vis à vis for violin and cello
- 2011 : Chamber Works vol. 3 - Acte Préalable AP0248 - *Jolanta Sosnowska: Violin sonata in A minor, Violin miniatures
- 2018 : Complete Songs vol. 1 – Acte Préalable AP0421 - Bogumiła Tarasiewicz, mezzo-soprano; Karol Schmidt piano
- 2018 : Complete Songs vol. 2 – Acte Préalable AP0422 - Bogumiła Tarasiewicz, mezzo-soprano; Karol Schmidt piano
- 2018 : Complete Songs vol. 3 – Acte Préalable AP0423 - Bogumiła Tarasiewicz, mezzo-soprano; Karol Schmidt piano
- Symphonic poem "Step" Orchestre des Champs Élysées - Philippe Herreweghe (2012 Narodowy Instytut Frederika Chopina / The Frederyk Chopin Institute.
- Symphonic Works, Vol. 1: Symphony No. 1, Morskie Oka, and Pan Zolzikiewicz (Sterling 1083)
- Symphonic Works, Vol. 2: Symphony No. 2, Variations on an Original Theme, and Odglosy paniątkowe (Sterling 1093)
- Symphonic Works, Vol. 3: Symphony No. 3, From the Life of the Nation, Prelude to Act 2 of Livia Quintilla, and Elegiac Polonaise (Sterling 1101)

Cultural offices
Preceded by Emil Młynarski	Music directors, Warsaw Philharmonic Orchestra; 1906–1908	Succeeded by Henryk Melcer-Szczawiński
