= Paul Homeyer =

German organist

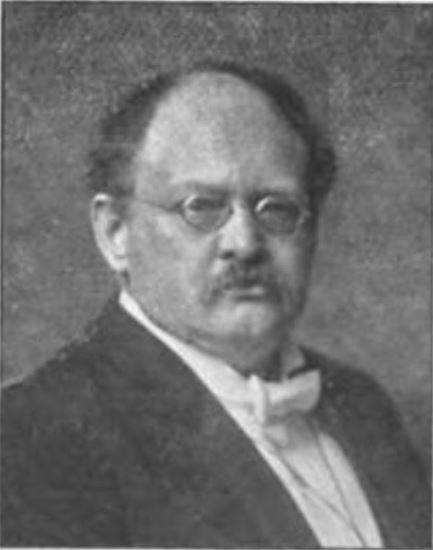
Paul Homeyer

Paul Homeyer (26 October 1853 – 27 July 1908) was a German organist who had an active international concert career during the late 19th century and early 20th century. His repertoire encompassed works from a variety of musical periods from ancient to contemporary works. He was particularly admired for his performances of the compositions of Johann Sebastian Bach, Robert Schumann and Felix Mendelssohn. In 1903 he was given special recognition for his work by King George of Saxony.

== Life ==
Born in Osterode am Harz, Homeyer began studying music at an early age with his father, organist Henry Homeyer, and his uncle, Josef Maria Homeyer. After attending high school in Hildesheim, he studied at Göttingen and at the Leipzig Conservatory. His teachers there were the professors Benjamin Robert Papperitz and Salomon Jadassohn.

In 1881 he started appearing in concerts in Leipzig that were organized by Carl Riedel's music club. Three years later he began performing regularly at the Gewandhaus in Leipzig. In 1885 he joined the faculty of the Leipzig Conservatory where he taught for the rest of his life. Among his pupils were organist T. J. Crawford, the composer Sigfrid Karg-Elert and the Anglo-Canadian conductor and keyboardist Harry Dean.

From the mid-1880s up until his death, Homeyer traveled extensively as a recitalist. He gave performances in Italy and Austria as well as cities throughout Germany. Franz Liszt attended one of these performances in 1883 in Karlsruhe and became an admirer of his artistry. He died in Leipzig at the age of 54.

== Sources ==
- Franz Neubert (Hrsg.), Deutsches Zeitgenossenlexikon, Leipzig (1905).
