= Pier Francesco Valentini =

Italian nobleman, composer and music theorist

Pietro Francesco Valentini (c.1570-1654) was an Italian nobleman, amateur composer and music theorist. He studied with G. B. Nanino. His tour de force on the art of the contrapuntal canon was Canone nel nodo Salomonis (1631) a 96-voice contrapuntal exercise which could be expanded to a symbolically significant 144,000 voices, singing at different speeds and in different metres. He also published more conventional madrigal and motet collections.
