= Jean-Étienne Marie =

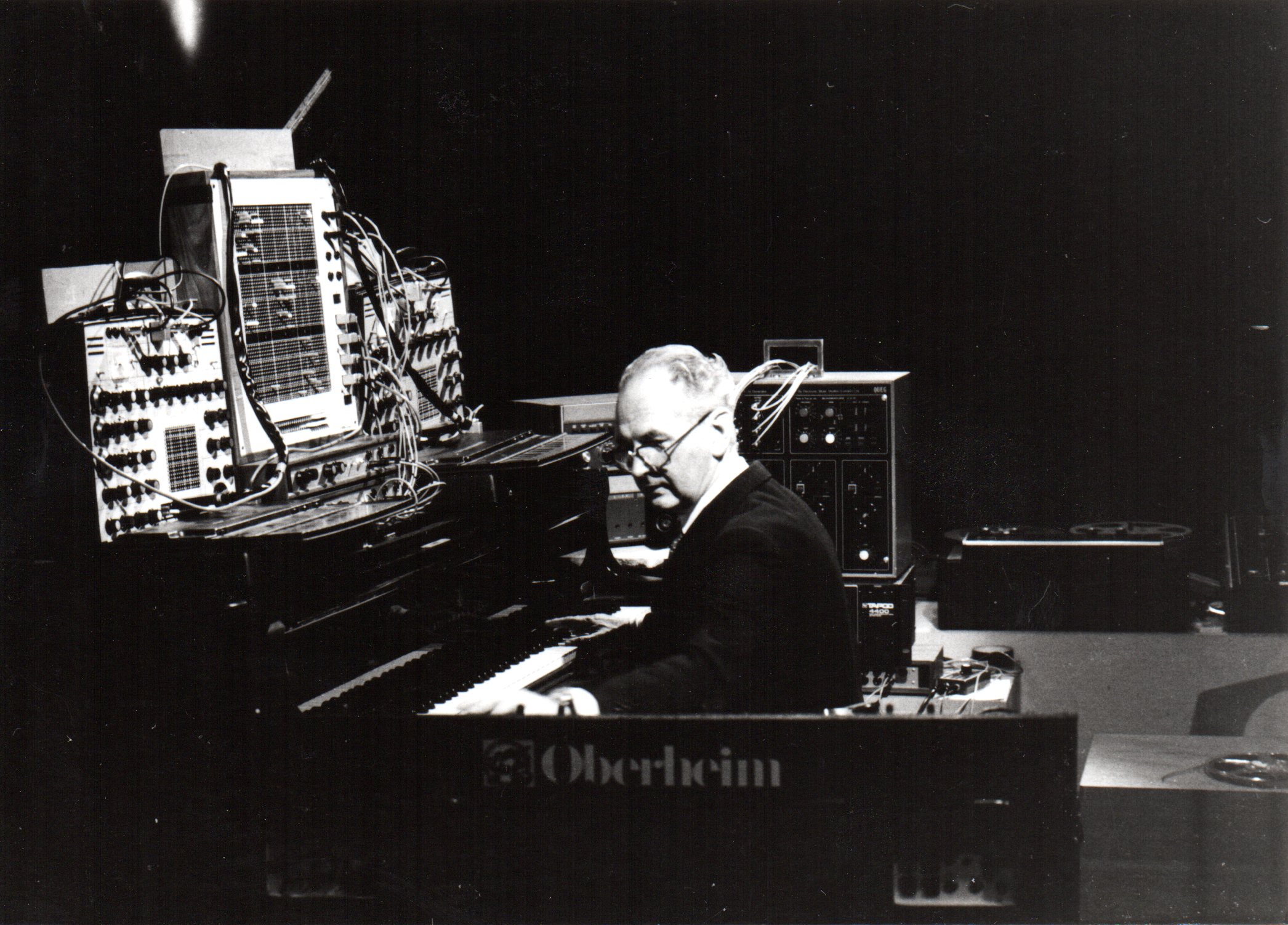

Background information
- Born: 22 November 1917
- Origin: Pont-l'Évêque, Calvados, France
- Died: 25 December 1989 (aged 72)
- Genres: Microtonal, electroacoustic, contemporary classical
- Occupation: Composer

Jean-Étienne Marie (French pronunciation: [ʒɑ̃ etjɛn maʁi]; 22 November 1917 – 25 December 1989) was a French composer of contemporary music. He is an important figure in the history and exploration of Microtonal music and electroacoustic.

== Biography ==
Born in Pont-l'Évêque, Calvados, Marie studied at the Conservatoire de Paris with Simone Plé-Caussade. After World War II, he dedicated his life to music. He worked at the Radiodiffusion Française, where he was a specialist in broadcasting contemporary music festival. His students included author and composer Jeannine Richer.

Marie was the disciple of Olivier Messiaen and of Darius Milhaud, but it is his meeting with microtonality pioneer Julián Carrillo that was crucial in his musical work. He created le CIRM in 1968 in Paris and set it to Nice in 1978. In 1979 he created the MANCA Festival (Musiques actuelles Nice Côte-d'Azur).

== Music ==
He dedicated most of his work to microtonal and to mixed music. His works and his theorisation in microtonal music were significant in the modern knowledge of European microtonal music.

Like Julian Carrillo, he explored the potential of microtonal scales, either widespread (1/4 tone, 1/3rd tone, 1/6tone) or less known (1/7th tone, 1/5th tone). One of his techniques was to use polytempered music, that is to say music exploiting the simultaneous use of several different microtonal scales. This concept suggested by Carillo. In Tombeau de Carillo he exploited 1/2, 1/3rd, 1/5th and 1/6 tone scales simultaneously.

He also tried to apply serialism to these scales. In 1972 he wrote a serial and polytempered piece Ecce Ancilla Domini, where he uses rows in 1/4, 1/5th and 1/6th tone.

== Works ==
- DEUX POEMES DE PAUL ELUARD 1949
- SONATE POUR HAUTBOIS SOLO 1950
- PIECES VOCALES TROISIEME DIMANCHE DE CAREME 1951
- LES CHAUSSONS VERTS 1952
- UN GARCON, UNE FILLE, UN CHIEN ET DES ... 1953
- POESIES (Schéhadé) 1956
- POLYGRAPHIE POLYPHONIQUE n°1 1957-58
- PENTHATLE MONOGENIQUE 1958
- LA MUERTE DEL TORO 1959
- IMAGES THANAIQUES 1960-61
- LE CHRIST DANS LA CITE 1962
- EXPERIENCE AMBIGUE 1962
- POLYGRAPHIE POLYPHONIQUE n°2 1961-63
- ACOUSTIQUE PAR L'IMAGE 1965
- HOMMAGE A JULIAN CARRILLO 1965
- LE TOMBEAU DE CARRILLO 1966
- OBEDIENS USQUE AD MORTEM 1966
- NOCTURNE MARIN (O'Tamsi) 1967
- TLALOC I 1967
- APPEL AU TIERS-MONDE 1967-68
- LES CAVES DE L'ESPRIT (Nerval) 1968
- MIMODRAME 68 1969
- S 68 1969
- JOIE 1969
- BSN 240 1969
- CONCERTO MILIEU DIVIN 1969-70
- SAVONAROLE 1970
- ICH GLAUBE 1971
- TOMBEAU DE Jean-Pierre Guézec 1971
- ECCE ANCILLA DOMINI 1972
- SYMPHONIES 1972
- LA PAROLE DE DIEU EST COMME UNE EPEE 1972
- UN FANAL POUR MES CANAUX 1972
- VOS LEURRES DE MESSE 1972
- EMETTEUR DE NORDHEIM 1973
- ITHOS 1974
- IN MANUS TUAS DOMINE 1975
- CRHEODE LAMBDA 1977
- COMPLIES A ST-THOME 1977
- QUAND ELIE L'ENTENDIT 1977
- TOMBEAU DE CESAIRE LEVILLAIN 1978
- CHREODE MU 1978
- LE CUIRASSE POTEMKINE 1978
- OBSERVER 01 1978
- OBSERVER n°5 1978
- OBSERVER n°6 1979
- TROIS ETUDES POUR DEUX PERCUSSIONISTES 1979
- FRACTAL FIGURAL III 1980
- GRAVURE POLYMORPHIQUE 1980
- HEPHAISTOS 1980
- TLALOC II 1980
- TROIS AFFICHES D'HOLGER MATTHIES 1980
- SOLDE POUR UN COMPTE DE NOEL 1981
- FRACTAL FIGURAL IV 1981
- IRRATIONNELLE HOMOTHETIE 1981
- AULOGRAPHIE 1981
- LE VIOLENT HARMONIEUX COMBAT 1981
- ESPACES DE REVES: I - REPETITION 1981
- JE SUIS ALLE A THOARA 1981-82
- LES BIJOUX DE CORNELIA 1982
- TOPIQUE TOPIAIRE 1982
- BIOT HERMES 1983
- BONJOUR MONSIEUR LIGETI 1983
- LIMONAIRE LITHOGRAPHE 1983
- DE L'AMBIGUITE ( Hommage à Evariste Galois ) 1983
- SYNFONIETTA 1983
- IMPROVISATION II 1983
- LIS ABEIHO FASIEN VIOULOUN DE SIS ALETO 1984
- SYLVIANA STORY 1984
- HOLZWEGE 1984
- LABYRINTHE 1985
- LIS ABEIHO FASIEN VIOULOUN DE SIS ALETO, version Ballet 1985
- SYLVIANA STORY version Ballet 1985
- IMPROVISATION III 1985
- TOMBEAU DU DOCTEUR DOUADY 1985
- MOBILE ALEATOIRE BACH 1986
- COJE 1986
- EN LIEU ET PLACE DE 1986
- PAPA, MAMAN, LA MUSIQUE ET MOI 1986
- ARMURES AUX DUITES ENCHAINEES 1987
- LES PIRATES AVALAIENT DES COULEUVRES 1987
- MARANA THA 1988
- TROIS POEMES SANS TEXTE 1988
- CONDORCET 1990
