= Ketzerbachtal =

- Ortsteil of Nossen
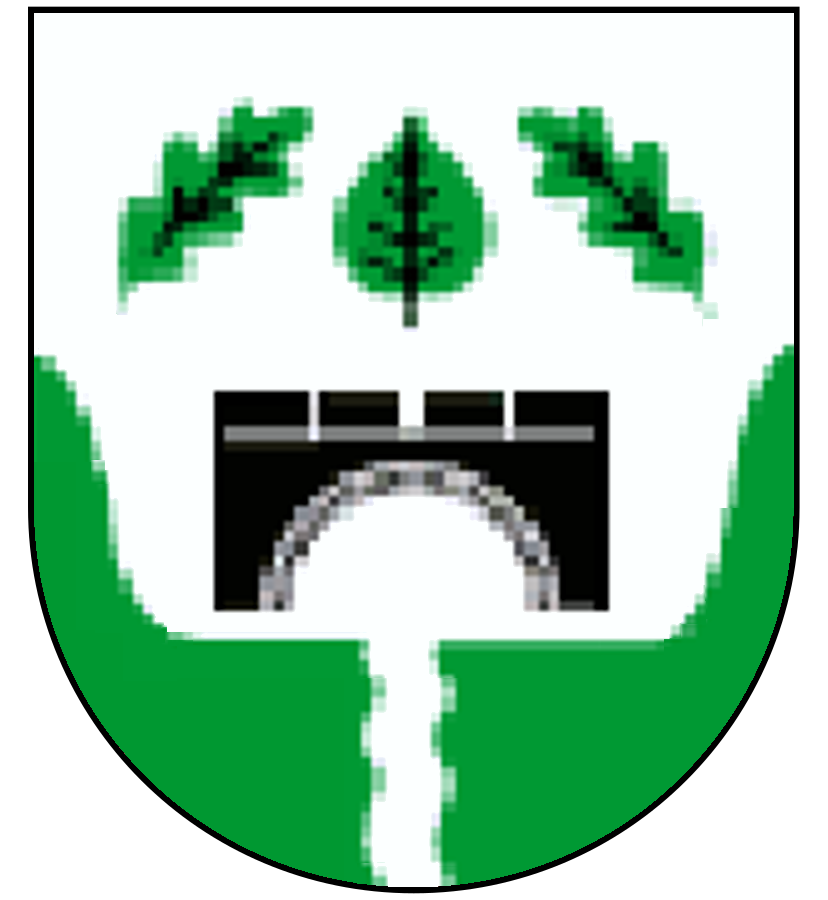
- Coat of arms
- Interactive map of Ketzerbachtal
- Location within Germany Location within Saxony
- Coordinates: 51°7′N 13°19′E
- Country: Germany
- State: Saxony
- District: Meißen
- Town: Nossen

Area
  - Total: 45.38 km^{2} (17.52 sq mi)
- Elevation: 246 m (807 ft)

Population (2012-12-31)
  - Total: 2,578
  - Density: 56.81/km^{2} (147.1/sq mi)
- Time zone: UTC+01:00 (CET)
  - Summer (DST): UTC+02:00 (CEST)
- Postal codes: 01623
- Dialling codes: 035246
- Vehicle registration: MEI, GRH, RG, RIE
- Website: www.ketzerbachtal.de

Ketzerbachtal (German pronunciation: [ˈkɛtsɐbaxˌtaːl], lit. 'Ketzerbach Valley') is a former municipality in the district of Meißen, in Saxony, Germany. Since 1 January 2014, it is part of the town Nossen.
