= Pierre Gabaye =

French composer (1930–2019)

Pierre Gabaye (20 February 1930 – 1 November 2019) was a French composer.

His musical education began at age seven on piano, which led him to pursue a career as a pianist and composer in both the classical and jazz spheres. He studied piano with Simone Plé-Caussade at the Conservatoire de Paris. He won the 1956 Prix de Rome, and was later appointed Director of Light Music at Radio France. He retired in 1986 and moved to Chamonix, where he lived until his death in 2019 at age 89.

Gabaye's compositional style can be described as a late example of French neo-classical tradition, in the mold of Poulenc and Saint-Saëns. Much of his music is light-hearted and written for brass and wind instruments.

== Selected works ==
- Boutade, for trumpet (1957)
- Recréation (1958)
- Two Pieces for Wind Instruments (1959)
- Sonatina for clarinet and piano (1959)
- Special, for trombone (1970)
