= Virginia Carrington-Thomas =

American organist

Virginia Carrington-Thomas in 1924.

Virginia Carrington-Thomas (born 27 October 1897 in Bristol CT; † 3 April 1978 in New York) was an American organist, composer, editor of organ music, and music educator.

== Biography ==
Already at the age of four, Carrington expressed a desire to become an organist. In 1916, at the age of 16, she was appointed organist at South Park Methodist Church in Hartford, CT. A year later she was accepted into the American Guild of Organists as its youngest member at the time. In 1918 she enrolled at Yale University's School of Music, her organ teacher being Harry B. Jepson and her composition teacher being Horatio Parker. During her studies, Carrington served as organist at the United Church in New Haven, where she met Richard Banks Thomas, an architecture student. They married in 1920 and had four children, born in 1921, 1925, 1926 and 1929.

Carrington-Thomas graduated from Yale University School of Music in 1921. In 1922, sponsored by a scholarship, she spent the summer months at the Conservatoire Américain in Fontainebleau, which had been founded the previous year. Her organ teacher there was Charles-Marie Widor, with whom she studied the works of Bach and Franck, among others, but also Widor's own works. After a second stay in Fontainebleau in the summer of 1923, Carrington-Thomas was appointed organist at the First Baptist Church in Jacksonville, FL, and in 1925, as the youngest member of the American Guild of Organists at the time, she was made a Fellow. In 1926 she was appointed professor at the Florida State College for Women in Tallahassee. That same year, Carrington-Thomas founded the Florida Chapter of the American Guild of Organists.

In 1929 the family moved to Hempstead on Long Island, where Carrington-Thomas founded the Nassau Chapter of the AGO. At that time she also studied with Rubin Goldmark at the Juilliard School (composition) and Lynwood Farnam (organ). In 1930 Carrington-Thomas was appointed organist at the Brooklyn Museum. In 1935 she moved to New York City. Two years later she began her collaboration with the Hammond Organ Company, founded in Chicago in 1935. Carrington Thomas became director of the "Hammond Organ School" in New York City and made an important contribution to the popularization of the Hammond organ. She played 266 concerts on the Hammond Organ during the 1939 World's Fair in the pavilion of the "Garden of Security" donated by the Equitable Life Assurance Society. She also published numerous editions of sheet music with arrangements of works for pipe organ or original compositions for the Hammond organ.

Throughout her career, Thomas-Carrington played hundreds of concerts and recitals at venues that included Carnegie Hall, New York, Aeolian Hall, London, Ontario, and Town Hall, New York. She was a tireless advocate of the electric organ promoting the organ through recitals and public schools. Over her career, she successfully promoted the installation of over 300 electric organs in American high schools and was the founder of the Hammond Organ School in New York.

From 1962 until her retirement in 1968, Carrington-Thomas served as organist at Madison Square Garden in New York City.
