= Lynn Lonidier =

American writer

- Born: April 22, 1937; Lakeview, Oregon
- Died: May 18, 1993 (aged 56); San Francisco, California
- Occupations: Poet, Teacher, Author, and Multimedia and Theatre Performance Artist

Lynn Lonidier (April 22, 1937 – May 18, 1993) was an American writer.

== Literary career ==
Lonidier published five collections of poetry including Po Tree (1967), The Female Freeway (1970), A Lesbian Estate (1977), Clitoris Lost: A Woman's Version of the Creation Myth (1989). She also published three broadsides. Janine Canan edited her posthumous collection of poetry.

== Bibliography ==
The Rhyme of the Aged Mariness, Station Hill, Barrytown, NY, Introduction by Jerome Rothenberg, Edited by Janine Canan, 2001

Fire-Rimmed Eden: Selected Poems by Lynn Lonidier, Sinister Wisdom, Edited by Julie Enszer, 2023
