= Anna Diller Starbuck =

American musician (1868–1929)

Anna Maria Diller Starbuck (August 29, 1868 – February 12, 1929) was a composer, music educator, organist, and pianist. She was one of the first two women to attend Harvard University.

Starbuck was born in Lancaster, Pennsylvania, to Anna Margaret Frey and Isaac Diller. Her eyesight was damaged when she contracted spinal meningitis as a young child. She graduated from Hellmuth College in 1887, later studying at Leipzig Conservatory, Zurich Musikschule, and Harvard University. Her teachers included Robert Freund, Helen Hopekirk, Friedrich Niggli, Oskar Paul, Paul Quasdorf, Carl Reinecke, Gustav Schreck, and Bruno Zwintscher. She made her piano debut at Steinert Hall in Boston in January 1895, and on August 5, 1896, married Edwin Diller Starbuck. He changed his middle name to her maiden name. They had eight children.

The Starbucks lived in Palo Alto, California, until 1904, when they moved to Iowa City to teach at the University of Iowa. Edwin taught education and philosophy, and Anna taught music. The Central Lecture Bureau in Iowa City booked lectures by Edwin and recitals of French, German, Russian, or general music with interpretive comments by Anna. A review in the Boston Evening Transcript noted that “Mrs. Starbuck is an artist of rare accomplishment and surprising versatility.” She gave piano recitals throughout America, including Boston, Des Moines, Indiana (Earlham College), Massachusetts (Mount Holyoke College), Pennsylvania (Harrisburg and Lancaster), Vermont (Burlington), and Washington D.C.

Anna Diller Starbuck's compositions were published by Clayton F. Summy Co. They included pieces for organ and piano, songs, and music for an unspecified Greek play. She wrote the harmony and a violin obbligato for A Pledge to Iowa by Jessie E Worthington, as well as a second piano part for W.A. Mozart's Sonata in F Major K. 332.
