= David Maurice Levett =

American classical composer

David Maurice Levett (1844–1914) was an American composer.

Levett was born in New York City. He studied music in New York, Germany, and France, and graduated from the Leipzig Conservatory in 1871. During his time at Leipzig, he studied under Ignaz Moscheles, Oscar Paul, Robert Papperitz, Louis Plaidy, Karl Reinecke and Ernst Richter.

He taught from 1876 in New Brunswick, NJ, Jacksonville, Ill., and Chicago, settling in New York in 1885. After 1900 he taught at the College of Music. In 1898–1900 he was in the faculty of the Stern Conservatory in Berlin. He composed several symphonic poems including Harlequinade and Memories, a romance and a serenade for violin and piano.
