= Philip Spratley =

English composer and writer

Philip Spratley (born 1942) is an English composer and writer on Essex folksong. He has worked as a school music teacher and church organist.

Spratley was born in Newark in Nottinghamshire and grew up in the village of Balderton. He won a scholarship to the Royal Manchester College of Music, where he studied composition with Thomas Pitfield. He went on to work as a teacher, choirmaster and organist, including 19 years as director of music at Bourne Abbey. On retirement, Spratley moved to Deeping St James in Lincolnshire and concentrated on composition, including the revision of many of his earlier works.

== Works, editions and recordings ==
Spratley's music, in the English tradition of Britten and Tippett, shows the influence of folk song, a subject on which he has written. His works include three symphonies - A Choral Symphony (1983, later revised), An Autumn Symphony (2008-9) and the Symphony No 3 Sinfonia Pascale (2013) - as well as a Violin Concerto (1991 and later revisions), the Belvoir Suite for flute and orchestra (1977) and two operas: Rutterkin op. 14 (1971) and The Three Strangers, op. 20 (1977). His catalogue includes orchestral, band and choral music, chamber music and works for organ. Toccata Classics has issued several recordings. Bardic Edition is his publisher.
