= Bruno Zwintscher =

German piano educator

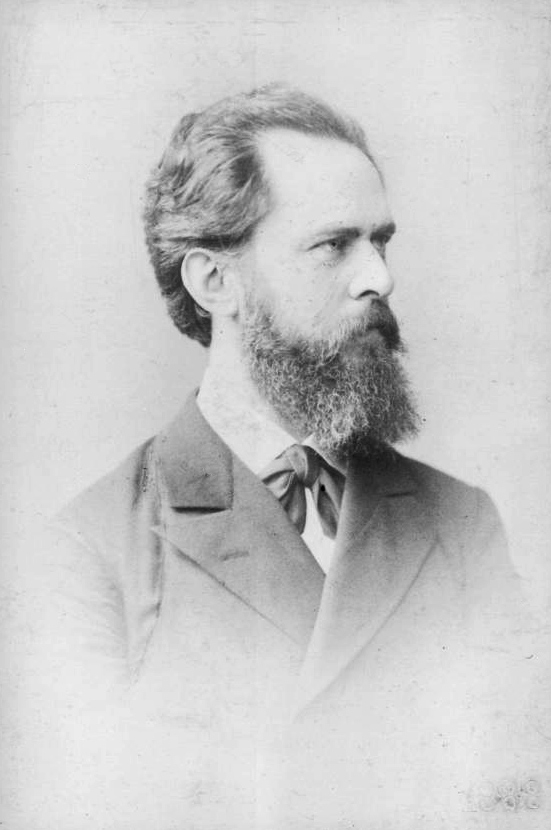
Bruno Zwintscher (1888)

Bruno Zwintscher (15 May 1838 – 4 March 1905) was a German piano educator.

== Life ==
Born in Ziegenhain (now part of Nossen) in the Kingdom of Saxony, Zwintscher attended the Dresdener Kreuzschule before he became a student of Louis Plaidy at the University of Music and Theatre Leipzig in 1856. From 1875 to 1896, Zwintscher himself worked as a piano teacher at this conservatory. His students there included Anna Diller Starbuck. Afterwards, he worked as a private teacher in Dresden. His Klavier-Technik is an extension of Plaidy's work. He also published Musikalische Verzierungen.

Otto, born from Zwintscher's marriage to Frieda, had three sons: the philologist Arthur (1867–1937), the painter Oskar (1870–1916) and the pianist Rudolf (1871–1946).

Zwintscher died in Oberlößnitz near Radebeul at the age of 64.

== Work ==
- Klavier-Technik, 7 Hefte, Leipzig ohne Jahresangabe (published in English by C.H. Porter as Technical Exercises Systematically).
- Musikalische Verzierungen: Praktische Übungen und theoretische Erläuterungen nebst einen Anhang über den Metronom. Leipzig 1895.
- Clavier-Technik systematisch geordnet zum Gebrauch bei seinem Unterricht. (1900)

== Literature ==
- Wilibald Gurlitt, Carl Dahlhaus (1961). Riemann Musik-Lexikon. In three volumes and two supplementary ones. Vol. 2. Personenteil L–Z (12. completely reworked ed.). Mainz: B. Schotts-Söhne. p. 976.
