= Humphrey Procter-Gregg =

English composer and academic

Humphrey Procter-Gregg (31 July 1895 – 13 April 1980) was an English composer and academic.

== Career ==
He was born in Kirkby Lonsdale and educated at King William's College on the Isle of Man and at Peterhouse Cambridge, where he was organ scholar. He studied music with Charles Villiers Stanford (among his last pupils), Charles Wood and Julius Harrison at the Royal College of Music in London and gained a studentship at La Scala in Milan.

After graduating, he went on to work at various opera houses (including Covent Garden, Thomas Beecham's British National Opera Company and Carl Rosa) as stage manager, producer or manager. While head of the Opera Department at the Royal College of Music in the 1920s he staged managed and designed their first productions of Vaughan Williams' The Shepherds of the Delectable Mountains and Hugh the Drover, and produced Sir John in Love.

In 1936 Procter-Gregg became Reader in Music at the University of Manchester, founding the Chair of Music as Emeritus Professor in 1954 and retiring in 1962, when he was succeeded by Hans Redlich. During his tenure the students included Harrison Birtwistle, Peter Maxwell Davies, Alexander Goehr, Peter Hope, Elgar Howarth, John Ogdon, John McCabe, Ernest Tomlinson and David Wilde. Hope recalled him as "very old fashioned. He just about got as far as Delius, but nothing beyond that". Peter Maxwell Davies was even more dismissive:

"Procter-Gregg hated anything by Stravinsky or Bartok, and referred to Beethoven as that dreadful German bow-wow. I went there to do composition, but he disliked me so much and he disliked the music I wrote so much and I disliked him so much that more or less by mutual agreement I was thrown off the composition course".

While at Manchester he encouraged the performance and composition of chamber music, and founded the Ad Solem Ensemble. The chamber choir is still in existence. His designs for the Denmark Road concert hall gave it one of the best acoustics for chamber music in the north of England. His home while in Manchester was at 66 Platt Lane, Rusholme.

In 1962 he became director of the London Opera Centre, but was forced to resign in April 1964 due to ill-health. He retired to live in Windermere, Cumbria to focus on opera translation and composing. In 1971 he was awarded the CBE for services to music. An 80th birthday tribute concert was held in Denmark Road on 31 October 1975, at which his Horn Sonata was played by Robert Ashworth. He died, aged 84, in a nursing home in Grange-over-Sands.

== Composition and writing ==
His compositions include a Clarinet Concerto (circa 1940) which has been recorded, works for voice and orchestra, two numbered string quartets, a string trio, four violin sonatas (including the 1936 Violin Sonata No. 1 in A minor, dedicated to Albert Sammons), the Clarinet Sonata (1943), the Horn Sonata in A (1975) and the Duettino for horn and piano. For solo piano there are a set of 24 Preludes, four books of Westmoreland Sketches (published posthumously in 1983), the Piano Sonata in C minor (The Sea), and many shorter pieces. There are also numerous songs and short choral settings. His final piece, Variations on an Air from Aberdeenshire for violin and piano, was completed just before his death.

Procter-Gregg produced around 20 opera translations and various other English adaptions of texts for music. He compiled and edited the book Sir Thomas Beecham: Conductor and Impresario in 1972.
