= Thomas Pitfield =

British musician and artist

- Born: Thomas Baron Pitfield; 5 April 1903; Bolton
- Died: 11 November 1999 (aged 96); Bowdon
- Occupation: Composer

Thomas Baron Pitfield (5 April 1903 – 11 November 1999) was a British polymath, primarily remembered as a composer, but also a poet, artist, engraver, calligrapher, master craftsman, furniture builder and teacher.

== Life ==
He was born at 57 New Road Bolton to elderly parents whose strict Victorian values and lack of support for his creative interests led to his being withdrawn from school at 14 for a seven-year engineering apprenticeship with Hick, Hargreaves & Co. Ltd. His designs for transmission machinery for the cotton industry survive as do his ink and watercolour paintings of railway engines.

Although he was essentially self-taught as a composer, he did study piano, cello and harmony at the Royal Manchester College of Music, where his teachers were Thomas Keighley, Kathleen Moorhouse, Frank Merrick and Carl Fuchs. He also received early advice on composition from Eric Fogg. In 1930 he won a scholarship to study art and cabinet-making at the Bolton School of Art.

After training as a teacher, he became art master at Tettenhall College, Wolverhampton. Whilst there, as a pacifist, he joined the Peace Pledge Union. In the Second World War he registered as a conscientious objector, with a condition that he continue teaching. He taught composition at the Royal Manchester College of Music from 1947 to 1973, where his pupils included David Ellis, Robin Field, John Golland, John McCabe, John Ogdon, Philip Spratley and Ronald Stevenson.

Pitfield was a lifelong vegetarian. Between 1986 and 1993 he wrote a three volume autobiography, and also wrote more than 260 poems. His collection The Poetry of Trees combines poetry and illustration. In 1957 he designed his house, ‘Lesser Thorns’, in Bowdon near Manchester, and made its furnishings. He continued to create art and music until his nineties.

Pitfield married his wife Alice Astbury, a pianist, on 26 December 1934. He died in Bowdon in November 1999, aged 96. Alice Pitfield died on 11 October 2000. Their house was sold and has since been demolished.

His autobiographical writings - including a fourth volume, Incidents from a Sixty Year Holiday Diary (1998) - as well as worklists and appreciations were published in 2024.

== Composition ==
As a composer Pitfield was influenced by Ralph Vaughan Williams, Percy Grainger and Frederick Delius. He was prolific, and his compositions are typically "light-hearted and small scale", referencing folk music and often including irregular rhythms. However there are also large scale works, including concertos for piano, violin, recorder and percussion as well as a five-movement Sinfonietta (1947), and over a dozen stage works with music, such as The Devil in White (1939) and Adam and the Creatures (1968), both described as morality plays. His Piano Concerto No. 1 was performed several times at the Festival of Britain in 1951. The paired choral cantatas A Sketchbook of Men and A Sketchbook of Women (both 1953), achieved some popularity.

Substantial chamber works include the Cello Sonata in D minor (1937-8, his own instrument), two Piano Trios (1930 and 1948/9), a Trio for flute, oboe and piano, an Oboe Sonata (1948) and a Xylophone Sonata (1965). There are also collections of miniatures for students and amateurs and solo works for accordion, clarsach, and harmonica. He also invented an instrument called “patterphone” to produce rain-like sounds.

He wrote for many notable artists, such as Léon Goossens, Evelyn Rothwell, Archie Camden, Carl Dolmetsch and Osian Ellis. His 1959 solo piano piece Diversions on a Russian Air (variations on the tune 'The Blacksmith'), was dedicated to John Ogden.

His music was published by more than 50 publishers. Hubert J. Foss of the Oxford University Press published many of his compositions, illustrations, frontispieces and cover-designs, which he made for various publications, including the one for Benjamin Britten's Simple Symphony. John Turner has published The Music of Thomas Pitfield: A Working Catalogue.

== Selected works ==
Orchestral

- Sinfonietta (1947)
- Piano Concerto No. 1 in E major (1947)
- Concert Overture (1950)
- Fantasia on an Old Staffordshire Tune (1950)
- Theme and Variations for string orchestra (pub. 1951)
- Fantasia for violin and orchestra (1953)
- Overture on North-Country Tunes (1953)
- Concerto Lirico for violin and orchestra (1958)
- Piano Concerto No. 2, The Student (1960)
- Concertino for percussion and orchestra (1961)
- Divertimento for oboe and string trio (1966/1967)
- Epitaph for string orchestra (1981)
- Recorder Concerto, with string orchestra and percussion (1985-6)
- Lyric Waltz for string orchestra (1988)
- Bucolics: Folk Song Studies (undated)

Chamber and instrumental

- Piano Trio No 1 in C major (1930)
- Prelude, Minuet and Reel for piano (1932)
- Violin Sonata No. 1 in A (1939)
- Cello Sonata in D minor (1937/1938, publ. 1949)
- The Circle Suite for piano (1938)
- Sonatina for cello and piano (1945)
- Sonatina for viola and piano (1947)
- Oboe Sonata in A Minor (1948)
- Piano Trio No 2 in F minor, Lyric) (1948/1949)
- Trio for oboe, bassoon and piano (1952)
- Novelette in F for piano (1953)
- Toccata for piano (1953)
- Trio for flute, oboe and piano (pub. 1953)
- Diversions on a Russian Air for piano (1959)
- Conversation Piece for clarinet and piano (1960)
- Sonata for Accordion (1963)
- Sonatina for clarinet and piano (1964)
- Studies on an English Dance Tune for piano (1964)
- Sonatina for percussion (1969)
- Three Nautical Sketches for recorder and piano (1982)
- Sonata for timpani (1985)
- Xylophone Sonata (1987)
- Epigraph for violin, cello and piano (undated)
- Sonatinas for piano, Nos. 1, 2 and 3

Vocal and Choral

- The Rhyming Shopman for baritone soloist, choir and orchestra (1940)
- Night Music for unaccompanied chorus (1941)
- A Sketchbook of Men, choral cantata (1953)
- A Sketchbook of Women, choral cantata (1953)
- A Sketchbook of Animals, choral cantata (1954)
- The Hills, chorus and orchestra (1960)
- By the Dee, song cycle for soloist and chamber ensemble (1962)
- A Shropshire Lass, soprano and orchestra (1987)
- Three Miniatures for soprano and violin (pub. 1989)
- Selected Songs, (pub. Forsythe, 1989)
- Carol Lullaby for soprano, recorder, and harp (undated)

Dramatic

- The Elm-Spirit, ballet (perf. 1934)
- The Rejected Pieman, ballet (perf. 1936)
- Maid of Hearts, ballet (perf. 1937)
- The Devil in White, morality play with music (1939)
- The Hallowed Manger, nativity play (1950–51)
- The Barnyard Singers, children’s opera (1954)
- Tansy, children's opera (1958)
- Adam and the Creatures, morality play with music (1968)
- Coney Warren, children's comic opera (1971)
- St Columba in Iona, morality play with music (1981–82)

Writings

- Musicianship for Guitarists (1959)
- Musicianly Scale Practice (1962)
- The Poetry of Trees (1944)
- No Song, No Supper: an Autobiography (London, 1986)
- Song after Supper, autobiography, part two (1990)
- A Cotton Town Boyhood, autobiography, part three (1995)
- Sixty Year Holiday Diary, autobiography, part four (1998)

== Recordings ==
- Concerto Lirico for violin and orchestra, Dutton Epoch CDLX 7221 (2009)
- Divertimento, Three Nautical Sketches, on Pitfield: His Friends & Contemporaries, Divine Art DDX 21246 (2024)
- Oboe Sonata, Violin Sonata No 1, Eight Songs, on Thomas Pitfield: Chamber Music, Heritage HTGCD210 (2015)
- Orchestral Music. Sinfonietta, Fantasia on an Old Staffordshire Tune, Lyric Waltz, Bucolics, Folk Song Studies, Concerto Lirico, Epitath. Toccata Classics TOCC0765 (2025)
- Piano Concertos Nos. 1 and 2, Xylophone Sonata, Naxos 8.557291 (2005)
- Piano Music. Diversions on a Russian Air, Three Bagatelles, Sonatina No.2, Prelude, Minuet and Reel etc. Heritage Records HTGCD132 (2025)
- Piano Trios Nos. 1 and 2, Cello Sonata, Sonatina, on Pitfield: String Chamber Music, Divine Art DDX 21137 (2024)
- Recorder Concerto, on English Recorder Music, Naxos 8.572503 (2010)
- Songs, The Songs of Thomas Pitfield, Divine Art DDX 21119 (2024)
- Theme and Variations for strings, on British Music for Strings IV, CPO 555 452-2 (2025)
- Violin Sonata No 1 in A, Lyrita SRCD359 (2017)
