= Emme Kemp =

American jazz musician

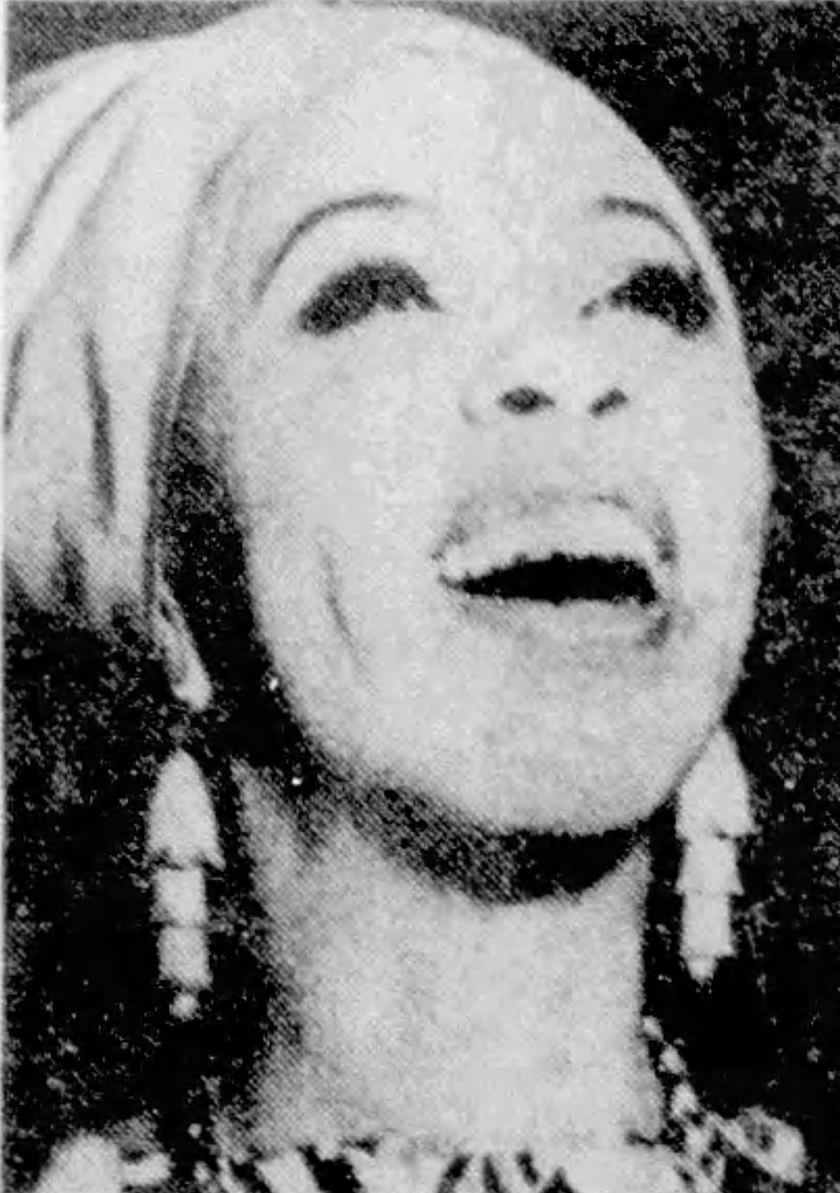
- Kemp c. 1977
- Born: Emmelyne Kemp; Chicago, Illinois, U.S.
- Education: North Western University, Berklee School of Music, New York University
- Occupations: Musician; composer; vocalist; pianist; historian; lecturer
- Website: emmekempallmusic.com

Emmelyne Kemp is an American pianist, vocalist, bandleader, Broadway composer, lecturer, and music researcher. She is a protégé of Eubie Blake. She is best known as a Broadway composer for Bubbling Brown Sugar. She is also known as a singer in the Woody Allen film Sweet and Lowdown. She has performed throughout the United States, Germany and Japan.

== Early life ==
Born in Chicago, Kemp was a child prodigy at the age of three, and she grew up on gospel and the blues. She attended Morgan Park High School and advanced her musical skills at Northwestern University and two conservatories. She also served in the Women's Army Corps.

== Career ==
Kemp's genre is blues, jazz, ragtime, gospel. She recorded with Eubie Blake. Her music label is Emme Kemp.

Her trio has consisted of Earl May (bassist), Earl Williams (drums).

Kemp performs on college campuses. She appeared in Woody Allen's film Sweet & Lowdown, starring Sean Penn. On Broadway, she composed music for, and acted in, Bubbling Brown Sugar, and wrote music for The American Dance Machine, and Don't Bother Me I Can't Cope, and Lorraine Hansberry's musical "Raisin.

She has performed her originals tunes on the Guiding Light and Captain Kangaroo.

She was coached with, and a student of Egon Petri.

Kemp is multilingual, performing in six languages.

=== Compositions ===
- Eyes on Harlem
- Someone To Sing To
- Composer for Bubbling Brown Sugar

=== Albums ===
- Try a Little Tenderness
- 2009 - The New! Some One To Sing To

== Awards ==
- Audelco Pioneer
