= Lucie Stern =

Russian pianist (1913–1938)

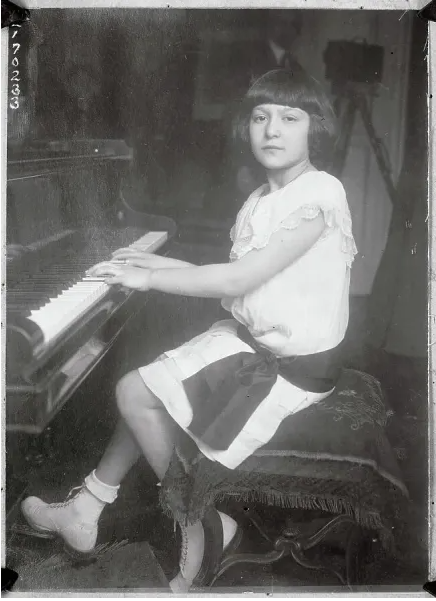
- Stern before August 1924
- Born: Lucie Stern; 14 November 1913; Riga, Russian Empire
- Died: 15 May 1938 (aged 24); New York City, US
- Education: Paula Goldberg (mother); Berlin Academy of Music (Egon Petri and Leonid Kreutzer); Curtis Institute of Music (Josef Hofmann)
- Occupation: Pianist
- Known for: Child prodigy

Lucie Stern (14 November 1913 – 15 May 1938) was a Russian classical pianist. She was considered exceptional even among child prodigies in Europe and the United States. Stern became the youngest student ever at the Berlin Music Academy at the age of six. Later, she earned a scholarship to the Curtis Institute of Music, made her Carnegie Hall debut and recorded for Ampico at 13. This confirmed the career success predicted for her; it ended early with her death at 24.

== Early life and education ==
Stern was born in Riga, then part of the Russian Empire and now part of Latvia, the daughter of Jewish piano teacher Paula Goldberg. Recognised as a child prodigy in piano, she became the youngest student at the Berlin Academy of Music (Berliner Hochschule für Musik). She studied with Egon Petri and under Leonid Kreutzer at six and a half.

During a family visit to the United States, Stern played several small concerts, which attracted the attention of Polish-American pianist Josef Hofmann, the head of the piano department at the Curtis Institute of Music. By September 1925, she was invited to his class at the institute and awarded a scholarship.

Hofmann said Stern had "the rarest talent of any child I ever heard" and dedicated time to nurturing her, as he did with her classmate Shura Cherkassky. Reflecting on Stern's interpretation of Liszt's sonata, he wrote to Mary Louise Curtis, the founder of the institute, highlighting the progress the young pianist had made under his tutelage. "You would have been amazed! Lyrics were lyrics! The Mephistophelean types soared like a volcano. They spewed fire!! ... She will become great!"

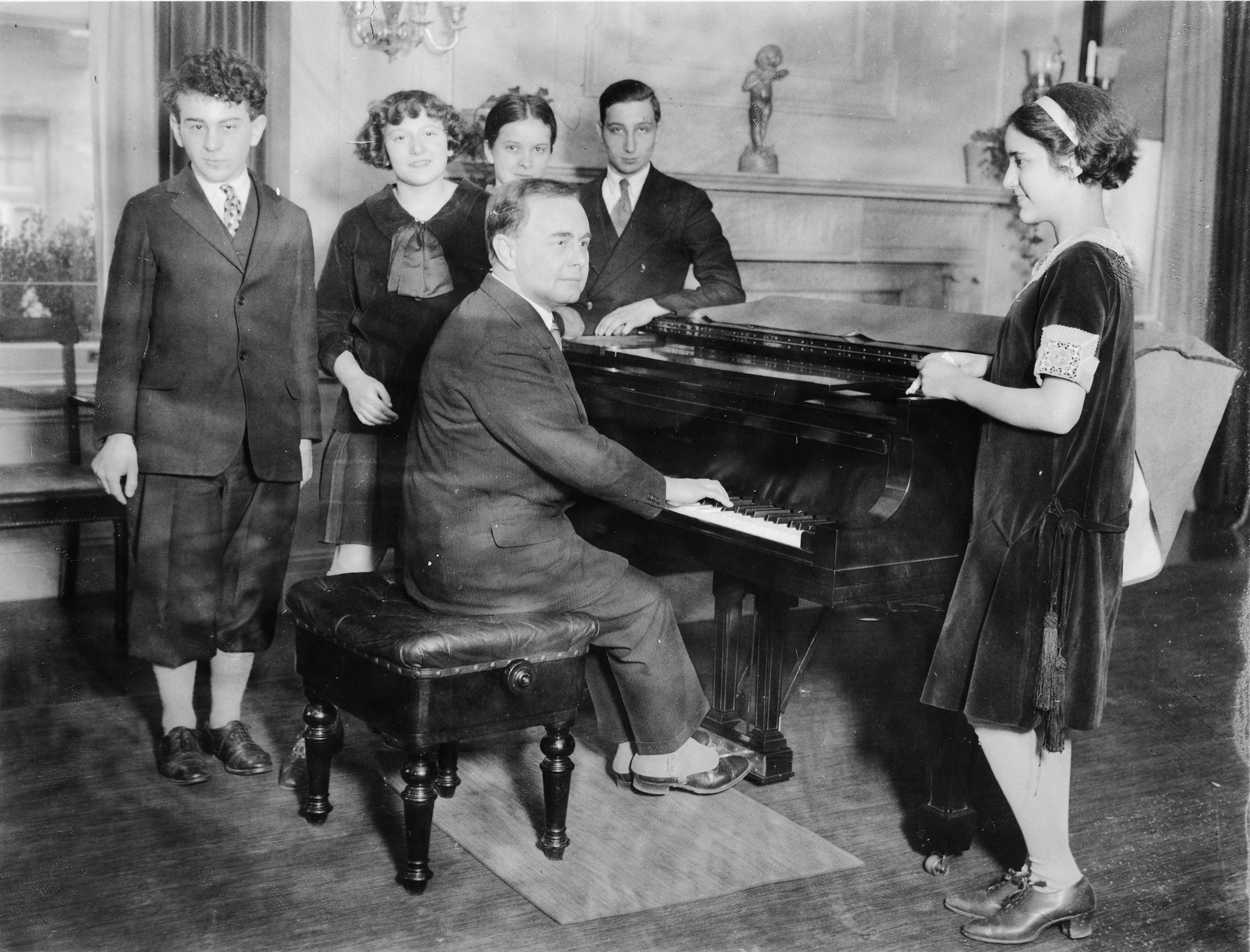
Hofmann's students 1927: from left, Shura Cherkassky, Lucie Stern, Martha de Blasiis, Joseph Levine and Jeanne Behrend

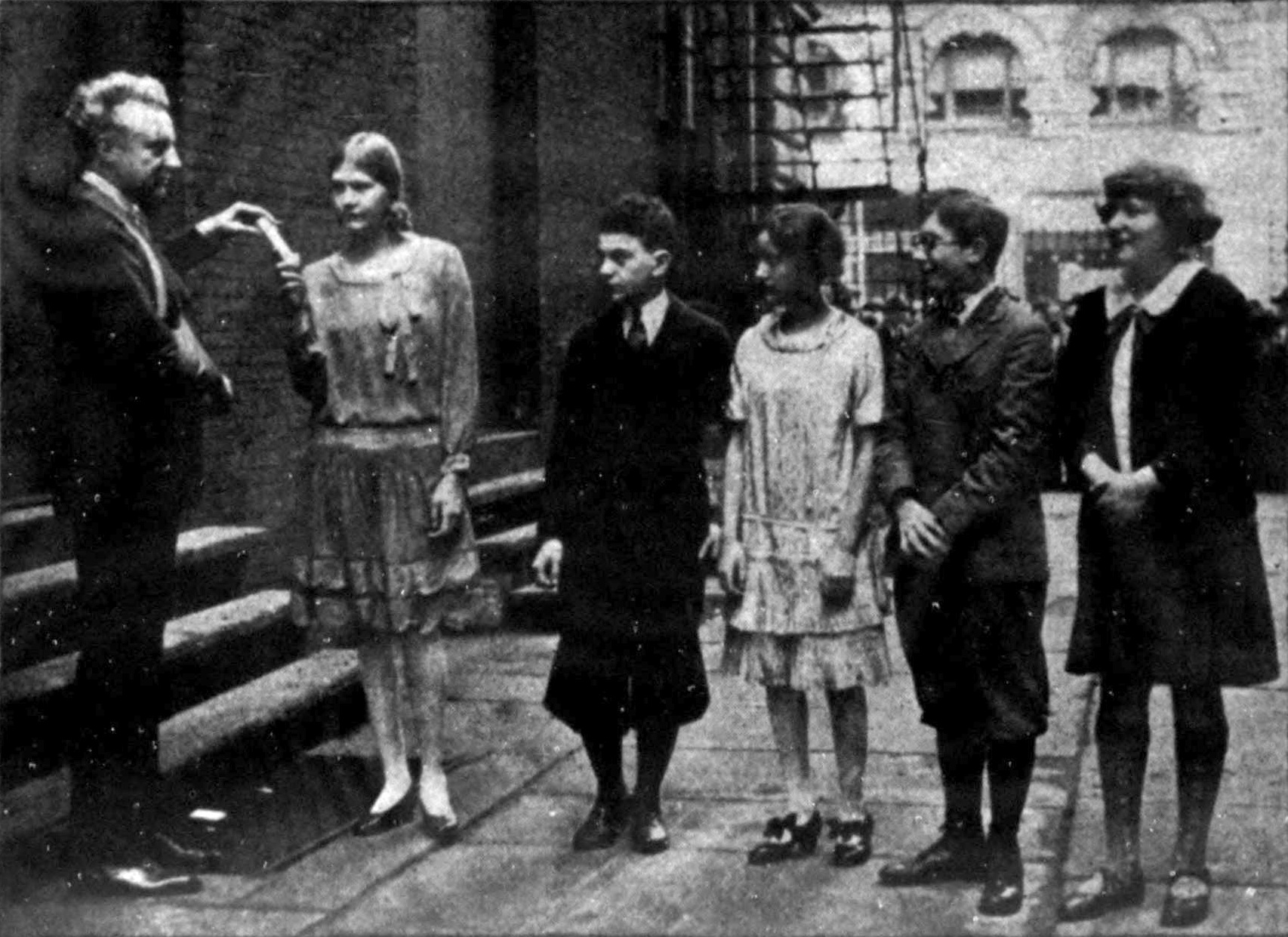
Lucie Stern on the far right with fellow students and the conductor Leopold Stokowski in 1927

== Career ==
Stern gained experience through solo and orchestra concerts in Germany and Central Europe; her youth often caused astonishment. She made her US debut on 21 December 1924 with the Philadelphia Orchestra, conducted by Mikhail Press, at the Philadelphia Academy for Music. Performing Beethoven's Piano Concerto No. 1, she achieved success. "Stern was enthusiastically received by the audience that completely filled every seat in the auditorium. She was recalled many times."

In 1925, Stern "first appeared on the New York concert stage at Town Hall" at the age of 11. Two years later, on 14 February 1927, she performed a demanding program at Carnegie Hall, including the "Bach-Busoni Chaconne, the Brahms-Paganini Variations, the Chopin B-flat minor sonata, Josef Hofmann's "Intermezzo", Liszt's transcription of Schubert's 'Erl-King', a nocturne written by Miss Stern herself, and, for good measure, Balakireff's Islamey". Olin Downes in The New York Times noted her "gigantic technic" and extensive repertoire. However, he argued that music demanded expression as much as technique, and Stern had yet to develop interpretative maturity beyond many concert pianists.

In 1929, she left the Curtis Institute and performed with considerable success in the cultural capitals of Europe and the US. From 1937, Stern resumed studies with Hofmann, while continuing her concert activities.

Stern died at Mount Sinai Hospital, Manhattan, "after a week's illness with a blood infection" at age 24. She is buried in the Jewish cemetery Har Nebo Cemetery, Frankford, Philadelphia.

== Recording and compositions ==
At the age of 13, Stern recorded a piano roll of Chopin's Impromptu No. 1 in A-flat major, Op. 29 for the American Piano Company. It was released in 1926.

Little is known about the pianist's compositions, which are considered lost. Stern occasionally enriched her solo programs with one of her works; German composer and musicologist Walther Hirschberg considered them in the tradition of Chopin and Liszt, as noted during her 23 September 1927 recital in Berlin's Beethovensaal.
