= Ernest Tomlinson =

English composer

Ernest Tomlinson MBE (19 September 1924 – 12 June 2015) was an English composer, particularly noted for his light music compositions. He was sometimes credited as 'Alan Perry'. Tomlinson wrote over 100 pieces of library music, thirteen orchestral suites, symphonic works (including symphonic jazz) and music for brass band.

== Early career ==
Tomlinson was born in Rawtenstall, Lancashire, England, into a musical family, one of four children to Fred Tomlinson Sr and May Tomlinson (née Culpan). His younger brother, Fred Tomlinson, also a musician, founded The Fred Tomlinson Singers. At the age of nine he became a chorister at Manchester Cathedral, where he was eventually appointed as Head Boy in 1939. He later attended Bacup and Rawtenstall Grammar School and at sixteen won a scholarship to Manchester University and the Royal Manchester College of Music. He spent the next two years studying composition until in 1943 he left to join the Royal Air Force, where, although colour-blind, he became a wireless mechanic and saw service in France during 1944 and 1945. He returned to England in 1945 to resume his studies (with Humphrey Procter-Gregg) and graduated in 1947, receiving the degree of Bachelor of Music for composition as well as being made a Fellow of the Royal College of Organists and an Associate of the Royal Manchester College of Music.

Tomlinson left northern England for London, where he worked as a staff arranger for Arcadia and Mills Music Publishers (1949-55), providing scores for radio and television broadcasts as well as for the stage and recording studios. He continued his interest in the organ by taking up a post at a Mayfair church, the Third Church of Christ Scientist at 7 Curzon Street, from 1948 until 1958.

== Broadcaster, conductor ==
Tomlinson had his first piece broadcast by the BBC in 1949 and by 1955 he had formed his own orchestra, the "Ernest Tomlinson Light Orchestra". From 1951 to 1953, he was musical director of the Chingford Amateur Dramatic and Operatic Society. In 1976, he took over the directorship of the Rossendale Male Voice Choir from his father, a post he held for five years, during which the choir won their class for three years in the BBC's "Grand Sing" competition. He was also the founder of the Northern Concert Orchestra, with whom he gave numerous broadcasts and concerts. He was a chief consultant for the Marco Polo Records British Light Music series of CDs, and was featured a number of times on Brian Kay's Light Programme.

== Composer ==
Tomlinson was primarily known as a composer of light orchestral pieces and produced a considerable body of works ranging from overtures, suites and rhapsodies and miniatures, of which Little Serenade (1955, originally composed for a BBC radio production of Cinderella) and Cantilena are probably the most popular. Also notable are a number of English folk-dance arrangements. In the 1960s, he wrote a number of Test Card pieces such as Stately Occasion and the tongue-in-cheek Capability Brown. His Fantasia on Auld Lang Syne (1976) is a quodlibet, which in its 20 minutes weaves in 129 quotations from pieces by other composers and folk and popular songs.

He also worked on larger-scale forms, including two symphonies (Sinfonia '62 and Symphony '65) for combined jazz and symphony orchestra. Sinfonia '62 won an Italian competition for "Rhythmic-Symphonic" works. Also notable are three concertos, including the Rhapsody and Rondo for horn and orchestra (premiered by Dennis Brain in 1954), the Concerto for 5 (five saxophones and orchestra) from 1965, and the Cornet Concerto premiered by Maurice Murphy and the Black Dyke Mills Band in 1974. There is also a one-act opera, Head of the Family and a Festival of Song for chorus and orchestra as well as numerous works for choirs, brass bands and concert bands.

In 1966, Tomlinson conducted his Symphony '65, in the Tchaikovsky Hall, Moscow, played by the Moscow Radio Symphony Orchestra and Big Band, which was the first time a symphonic jazz work had been heard in Russia.

== Archivist ==
In 1984, after discovering that the BBC were disposing of their light music archive, Tomlinson founded The Library of Light Orchestral Music, which is housed in a barn at his family's farmhouse near Longridge in Lancashire. The library currently contains around 50,000 pieces, including many items that would otherwise have been lost.

== Personal life ==
Tomlinson and his wife Jean (née Lancaster) were married from 1949 until her death in September 2006. He died at Longridge, near Preston in 2015. The couple had four children.

== Awards ==
Tomlinson won several prestigious awards; the Composers' Guild Award in 1965 and two Ivor Novello Awards - one for services to light music in 1970, the other for his full-length ballet Aladdin in 1975, written for the Northern Dance Theatre. For several years he was on the executive committee of the Composers' Guild of Great Britain, including being its chairman in 1964. In addition, he was from 1965 a composer-director of the Performing Rights Society.

Tomlinson was appointed Member of the Order of the British Empire (MBE), in the 2012 Birthday Honours, for services to music.

== Selected works ==
- Cumberland Square (1950)
- Three Pastoral Dances (1950)
- First Suite of English Folk Dances (1951)
- Silverthorn Suite (1950s)
- Rhapsody and Rondo for horn and orchestra (1954)
- Concert Jig (1955)
- Little Serenade (1955)
- Comedy Overture (1956)
- Three Gaelic Sketches (1956)
- Lyrical Suite (1957)
- Highway to the Sun (1962)
- Sinfonia '62 (1962)
- Concerto for 5, 5 saxophones and orchestra (1965)
- Symphony '65, symphonic jazz (1965)
- Capability Brown (1968)
- Head of the Family, one-act opera based on a story by W.W. Jacobs (1968)
- Stately Occasion (1968)
- Light Music Suite (1971)
- Cornet Concerto (1974)
- Aladdin, ballet (1975)
- Fantasia on Auld Lang Syne (1976)
- Second Suite of English Folk Dances (1977)
- Kielder Water (1983)
- Chadkirk Idyll for recorder and string quartet (2003)
