= David Jennings (composer) =

British composer

- Born: 30 May 1972 (age 54); Sheffield, West Riding of Yorkshire
- Education: University of Durham; University of Manchester
- Occupation: Composer
- Known for: Piano Sonata, Op. 1
- Website: Official website

David Andrew Jennings is an English composer (born Sheffield, Yorkshire, 30 May 1972). He read music at the University of Durham, studying composition with John Casken (a pupil of Witold Lutosławski) and again at Postgraduate level with Casken at the University of Manchester. Jennings has additionally benefited from regular consultations with Arthur Butterworth (a pupil of Ralph Vaughan Williams). Jennings' compositions employ a style that combines romanticism with more recent musical developments. His music is known to have been inspired by the works of poets and visual artists, especially English watercolourists from the early 1800s.

In 2012, The Divine Art label released a recording of Jennings' Piano Music performed by James Willshire, which was nominated as one of Music Web International's Recordings of the Year 2013. Jennings has also composed orchestral, vocal and chamber music.

In 2025, Jennings published a Gothic novel, "The Pleasures of Melancholy".

== Recorded and published works ==
- Piano Sonata, Op. 1
- Three Sonatinas, Op. 2
- Prelude and Fugue, Op. 6 (Divine Art recording James Willshire)
- Three Lyrical Pieces, Op. 17
- Miniature Suite, Op. 18
- Harvest Moon Suite, Op. 19
- Melancholy. A Fragment., Op. 23

== Other works ==
- Passacaglia and Fugue (In memory of Arthur Butterworth), Op.12
- Three Irish Pieces (2011), violin and piano, Op. 20
- A Weardale Rhapsody (2018), violin and piano, Op. 22
