= Ernst Perabo =

American composer and pianist (1845–1920)

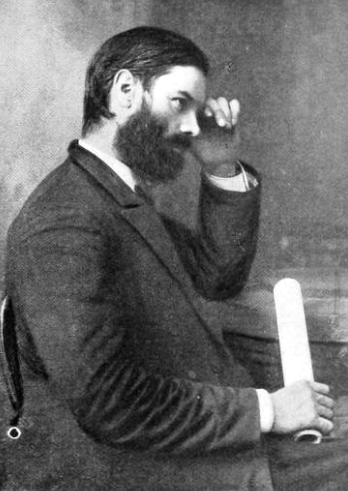
- Born: Johann Ernst Perabo; November 14, 1845; Wiesbaden, Germany
- Died: October 29, 1920 (aged 74); Boston, Massachusetts
- Burial place: Forest Hills Cemetery
- Occupations: Composer, pianist
- Spouse: Louisa Elizabeth Schmidt (m. 1889)

Johann Ernst Perabo (November 14, 1845 – October 29, 1920) was a German-born American composer and pianist.

== Biography ==
Ernst Perabo was born in Wiesbaden, Duchy of Nassau on November 14, 1845. In 1852, he immigrated with his family to New York City. He began his musical training with his father, then with William Schultze from the Mendelssohn Quintette Club and eventually came back to Europe to study at the Leipzig Conservatory with Carl Reinecke, Ignaz Moscheles, and Ernst Richter. From 1885 onwards, Perabo lived in Boston, where he led a career as a pianist, composer, and music teacher. He gave private lessons: his most famous student, who studied with him from 1876 through 1882, was the pianist and composer Amy Beach. He also taught at the New England Conservatory.

Besides original compositions for the piano (including one Scherzo; three Studies; Pensées; and Prelude, Romance und Toccatina), he wrote numerous transcriptions of and fantasies on operas and orchestral works.

He married Louisa Elizabeth Schmidt on June 1, 1889.

He died in Boston on October 29, 1920, and was buried at Forest Hills Cemetery.

Perabo collected a number of manuscripts and first editions of works by Bach, Mozart, Beethoven and Schubert, which are now preserved in the British Library.
