= Veronika Dudarova =

Russian conductor (1916–2009)

- Вероника Дударова
- Born: Veronikæ Barisy chyzg Dudaraty; December 5, 1916; Baku, Azerbaijani SSR, Soviet Union
- Died: January 15, 2009 (aged 92); Moscow, Russia
- Occupation: Conductor
- Years active: 1944–2009

Veronika Borisovna Dudarova (Note: Iron Ossetic: Вероникæ Барисы чызг Дудараты, romanized: Veronikæ Barisy chyzg Dudaraty; Russian: Вероника Борисовна Дударова, romanized: Veronika Borisovna Dudarova) (5 December [O.S. 22 November] 1916 – January 15, 2009) was a Soviet and Russian conductor, the first woman to succeed as conductor of symphony orchestras in the 20th century. She became a conductor of the Moscow State Symphony Orchestra in 1947, and led this and other orchestras for sixty years. In 1991, she founded the Symphony Orchestra of Russia.

== Early years and family ==
Veronika Dudarova was born in Baku to an ethnic Ossetian, formerly aristocratic, family. Before she was baptised, the girl was called Maleksima in the family. Her father Aslambek Kambulatovich Dudarov was an oilfield engineer. Like his wife Elena Danilovna (nee Tuskaeva), he had a good ear for music. Along with her sisters Tamara and Amakhtan, Veronika Dudarova received her first musical education in the family. Already at the age of three, she could pick out melodies on the piano by ear. At the age of 6, Dudarova began studying piano at the Children's Music School for Gifted Children at Baku Academy of Music. As she recalled later, her passion for conducting developed during classes of Hungarian composer and conductor Stephan Strasser, who taught gifted children during his visits to Baku.

In the early 1930s Dudarova's father was repressed as an "enemy of the people" and her two elder sisters died. In 1933 Veronika and her mother moved to Leningrad. So that the family's history would not affect Veronica's future, her mother changed her patronymic to Borisovna.

== Education ==
In 1933–1937, she studied at the piano department of the Leningrad Conservatory in Pavel Serebryakov's class. In 1937 Dudarova and her mother moved to Moscow. She started as a concert pianist and studied with Boris Berlin in the preparatory department of the Moscow Conservatory. A year later, Berlin recommended that she applies to the conductor's faculty.

In 1939, Dudarova took her exams at the Moscow Conservatory for the Conducting Department. The profession of conductor was considered exclusively male, and Dudarova's appearance was unexpected for the members of the admissions committee, which included Leo Ginzburg, Grigory Stolyarov and Lev Steinberg. Dudarova's biographers often quote her answer to the committee's question as to why she decided to become a conductor: "Because I don't fit on the piano. I only hear the music of the symphony orchestra.

Successfully passing the exam, she studied at the Conservatory until 1947 in the classes of Ginzburg and Nikolai Anosov.

In 1941, she married Boris Weinstein, a prominent chess player. In 1943, they welcomed a son, Michael. The family did not leave for evacuation, Weinstein worked in Glavoboronstroy. According to Michael Weinstein's recollections, a week before victory his father was wounded in Stetin. After the war, Veronika Dudarova received a Medal "For Valiant Labour in the Great Patriotic War 1941–1945".

In 1944, she became a conductor at the Russian Academic Youth Theater. In 1945-1946 she worked as an assistant conductor at the Opera Studio of the Moscow Conservatory. In 1947 Dudarova became second conductor of the Moscow Regional Philharmonic Orchestra. In its first years, the orchestra performed mainly in small towns of the Moscow region.

== Career ==
=== Moscow State Academic Symphony Orchestra (1947–1989) ===
For thirteen years, from 1947 until 1960, Dudarova was a junior conductor at the Moscow State Academic Symphony Orchestra. In 1960, Dudarova took over the Moscow State Academic Symphony Orchestra as chief conductor and artistic director, a position she held until 1989.

In 1960, Dudarova worked on the operetta "Spring Song" and Khristofor Pliev's opera "Kosta (opera)" as part of the decade of literature and art of the North Ossetian ASSR in Moscow.

In November 1972, the Moscow State Symphony Orchestra under the direction of Veronika Dudarova went on a foreign tour to Poland for the first time. The orchestra gave nine concerts, including a performance in Warsaw, and was highly praised by critics and audiences. One of the most successful years for the orchestra was 1977, when Dudarova renewed her orchestra's repertoire with 50 new programs. On August 10, 1977 Dudarova received the title of People's Artist of the USSR.

In 1979, the orchestra went on tour to the GDR, taking part in the VII International Festival of Contemporary Music.

In 1960, she took over as the principal conductor and led the orchestra until 1989. She led the Symphony Orchestra of Russia from 1991 to 2003 and retained the role of artistic manager of the orchestra until her death in Moscow in January 2009.

Over the years of managing the orchestra, Dudarova has performed and recorded a huge number of works of various repertoire, from Baroque music to contemporary symphonic music. She made her first recordings of works by such composers as Georgy Sviridov, Aram Khachaturian, Tikhon Khrennikov, Andrei Eshpai, Rodion Shchedrin, Mikael Tariverdiev, Alfred Schnittke, Elena Firsova, and many more. She collaborated with distinguished performers, including Vladimir Spivakov, Leonid Kogan, Valery Gergiev, Natalia Gutman, and others. Toured Czechoslovakia, Poland, Hungary, Bulgaria, Romania, Yugoslavia, Japan, Iran, Turkey, Spain, Sweden, Norway, Mexico, Venezuela, Panama, Colombia, Peru, and Cuba.

=== State Symphony Orchestra of Russia ===
In 1991, Dudarova founded the State Symphony Orchestra of Russia. She was its chief conductor and artistic director until 2003. In 2003, she offered Pavel Sorokin the post of chief conductor, but remained the artistic director until her death in 2009. When Dudarova died, her orchestra merged into the Russian National Orchestra.

== In memories of peers ==
Dudarova went down in history as one of three women who led major professional symphony orchestras for decades. She was distinguished by her indomitable character, willpower, and supreme professionalism. The first woman conductor in the USSR, she also entered the Guinness Book of Records as the only woman to have worked with major orchestras for more than 50 years. Colleagues and journalists have praised her distinctive, expressive style of performance and her ability to feel the music deeply.

Dudarova's colleagues recalled a curious case when she fired a trombonist three times for drunkenness and absenteeism, but then invariably hired him because he auditioned better than other applicants.

She was nicknamed "Encore Queen" after Ravel's Boléro was encored in its entirety in 1986 in Madrid at the insistence of the audience.

According to her son Mikhail, during a concert in Andorra in 1993, due to her intense style of conducting, Dudarova fell from the podium but went on conducting the orchestra lying on the floor leaning on her right hand and the piece was performed to the end without an interruption.

In 1994, four days before a concert celebrating the 220th anniversary of the annexation of Ossetia to Russia and the 210th anniversary of the founding of Vladikavkaz, Dudarova broke her leg. In order not to cancel the concert, she asked for anesthesia, a plaster cast to be made on stage, and to be brought on stage with the conductor's stand before the curtain rose.

== Personal life ==
Dudarova's marriage to Boris Weinstein lasted from 1941 to 1950. In 1950, she married Yury Vladimirov, a composer. They divorced in 1961. In 1963, she married a scientist Gavriil Deborin; they stayed together until his death in 1998. In a 2006 interview, Dudarova said she had five husbands.

In 2008, Dudarova was robbed by two women who introduced themselves as social workers and stole all the conductor's awards: the Order of the October Revolution, the Badge of Honor, the Order of Merit for the Fatherland, 2nd and 3rd class, medals, and the Dudarovs' family jewels.

== Heritage ==
Dudarova became the protagonist of several documentaries and movies. In the 1987 documentary A Woman Is a Risky Bet: Six Orchestra Conductors, directed by Christina Olofson, Dudarova conducts the Moscow State Symphony Orchestra and Choir in a performance of Mozart's Requiem.

The main-belt asteroid 9737 Dudarova was named after her.

== Sources ==
- Aksenov, A. M. (2006). РЕЖИССУРА ИГРЫ НА ФОРТЕПИАНО. Б. М. БЕРЛИН – МУЗЫКАНТ, ЛИЧНОСТЬ, ПЕДАГОГ. К 100-ЛЕТИЮ СО ДНЯ РОЖДЕНИЯ [Piano directing. B.M. Berlin – musician, personality, pedagogue. To the 100th anniversary of his birth] (PDF) (in Russian). Gnesin Russian Academy of Music. p. 42. ISBN 5-8269-0108-X.
- Andreev, Mikhail Alexandrovich (2018). "Подготовка к публикации монографии «история Московского государственного академического симфонического Оркестра п/у П. Когана» и проблема подбора иллюстративных материалов" [Preparation for publication of the monograph 'The History of the Moscow State Academic Symphony Orchestra']. Научный вестник Крыма [Scientific Bulletin of Crimea] (in Russian). 5 (16).
- Andreev, Mikhail A. (2021). "Организация и проведение зарубежных гастролей Московского государственного симфонического оркестра п/у В.Б. Дударовой в 1970-е гг" [Organization and conduct of foreign tours of the Moscow State Symphony Orchestra, conducted by V. B. Dudarova in the 1970s]. История и архивы [History and Archives] (in Russian) (3): 65–75. doi:10.28995/2658-6541-2021-3-65-7 (inactive 12 July 2025). ISSN 2658-6541.
- Batagova, T. E. (2016). "Performing Arts conductor Veronica Dudarova in the Russian literature of second half of XX century". Bulletin of Moscow State Institute (University) of Culture. 4 (72).
