= JoAnn Falletta =

American conductor

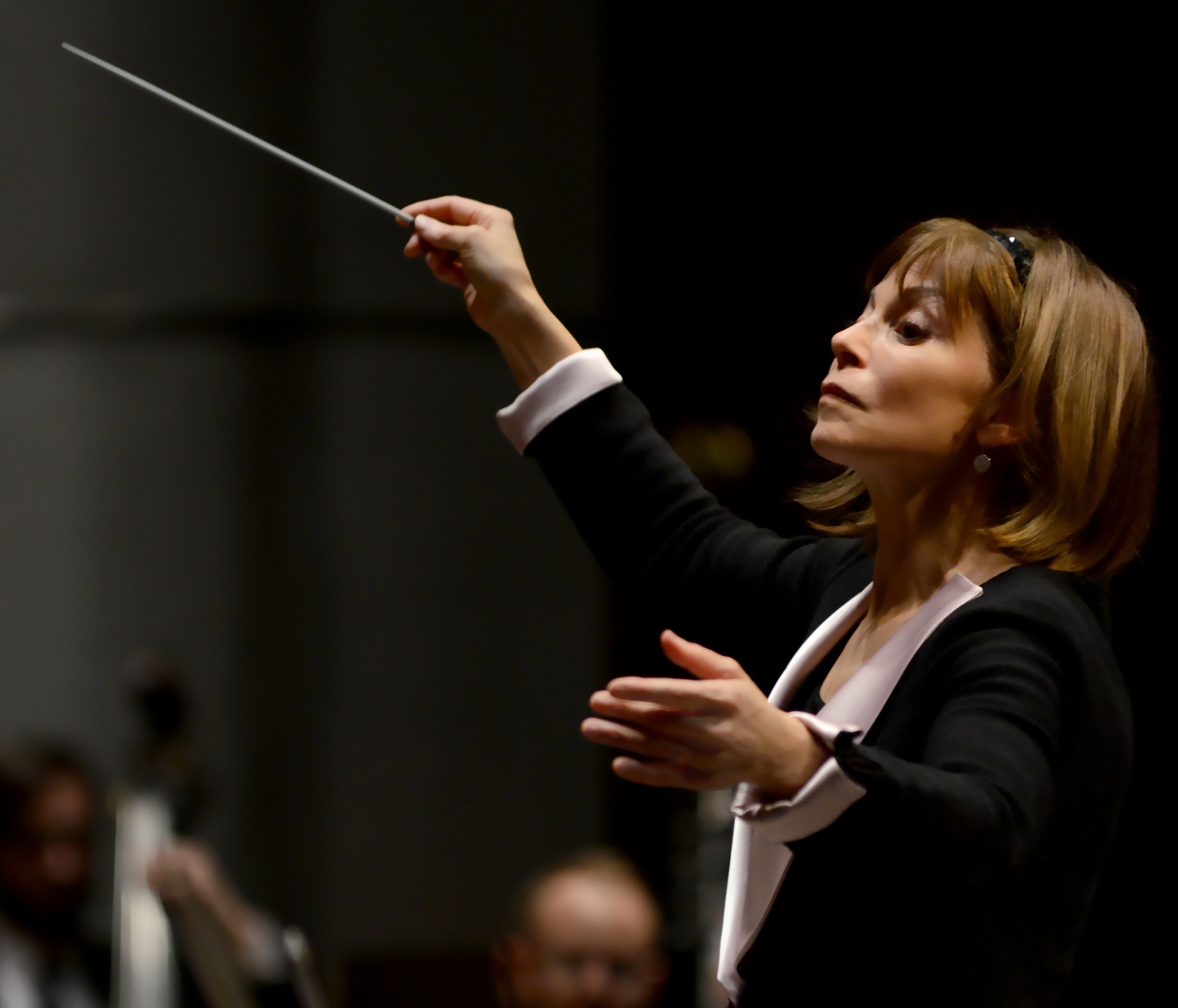
- Falletta in 2015

Background information
- Born: February 27, 1954 (age 72); Queens, New York, U.S.
- Occupations: Musician, conductor
- Years active: 1977–present
- Spouse: Robert Alemany (m. 1986)

JoAnn Falletta (born February 27, 1954, in Queens, New York) is an American conductor best known for her association with the Buffalo Philharmonic Orchestra, where she has served as music director since 1999. She was also closely associated with the Virginia Symphony and Long Beach Symphony orchestras.

== Biography ==
Falletta was raised in the borough of Queens in an Italian-American household. She was educated at the Mannes College of Music and The Juilliard School in New York City. She began her musical career as a guitar and mandolin player and in her twenties was often called to perform with the Metropolitan Opera and New York Philharmonic when a work called for a mandolin or guitar obbligato.

Falletta entered Mannes in 1972 as a guitar student but began conducting the student orchestra in her freshman year, which initiated her interest in a conducting career. While the Mannes administration at that time expressed doubts about the ability of any woman to gain a music directorship, it consented to an official transfer of emphasis for Falletta. After graduation, she pursued further study at Queens College (M.A. in orchestral conducting) and the Juilliard School of Music (M.M., D.M.A. in orchestral conducting). Falletta studied conducting with such conductors as Jorge Mester, Sixten Ehrling, and Semyon Bychkov and also participated in master classes with Leonard Bernstein.

Falletta's first permanent engagement was as music director of the Jamaica Symphony Orchestra, a position she held from 1977 to 1989. She served as music director of the Denver Chamber Orchestra from 1983 to 1992 and as associate conductor of the Milwaukee Symphony Orchestra from 1985 to 1988. From 1986 to 1996, she served as music director of the Bay Area Women's Philharmonic. She was music director of the Long Beach Symphony Orchestra from 1989 to 2000.

In 1991, Falletta was appointed the eleventh music director of the Virginia Symphony Orchestra (VSO), a position she held for 29 years through 2021 when she was named the Connie and Marc Jacobson Music Director Laureate. During her tenure, the Virginia Symphony performed at Carnegie Hall in New York and the Kennedy Center in Washington and released 18 recordings including discs on the Naxos label, Albany Records, NPR and the orchestra's own Hampton Roads label.

In May 1998, Falletta was named music director of the Buffalo Philharmonic Orchestra, and she formally took up the post with the 1999–2000 season. When she was appointed, she became the first female conductor to lead a major American orchestra. During her tenure in Buffalo, the orchestra has made recordings for Naxos Records and returned to Carnegie Hall after a 20-year absence. In 2004, the orchestra and television station WNED established the JoAnn Falletta International Guitar Concerto Competition. Following several contract extensions through her tenure, the Buffalo Philharmonic announced, in April 2025, the most recent extension of her contract as its music director through the 2028–2029 season.

In 2011, Falletta was appointed artistic director of the Hawaii Symphony Orchestra. In 2011, she was appointed the principal guest conductor of the Brevard Music Institute, where she continues to serve through the 2023 season.

Outside of the U.S., Falletta first guest-conducted the Ulster Orchestra in August 2010, and returned for further concerts in January 2011. In May 2011, Falletta was named the 12th principal conductor of the Ulster Orchestra, effective with the 2011–2012 season, with an initial contract of 3 years. She was the first American and the first female conductor to be appointed the orchestra's principal conductor. She concluded her Ulster Orchestra tenure after the 2013–2014 season. She has conducted over 100 North American orchestras and many of the most prominent orchestras in Europe, South America and Asia. She was also the first woman to conduct the orchestra of the National Theatre Mannheim.

Falletta served on the National Council on the Arts from 2008 to 2012, following her appointment by President George W. Bush and continued on into the Obama administration. She is portrayed in the documentary film Call Me Madame Maestro, produced and directed by Swedish film maker Christina Olofson. The film was named Best Documentary Feature at the NYFA New York International Film Awards in February 2022. Call Me Madame Maestro is a follow-up to Olofson's 1987 Swedish documentary A Woman Is a Risky Bet: Six Orchestra Conductors, where JoAnn Falletta appears conducting the Queens Philharmonic in Stravinsky’s The Rite of Spring in rehearsal and performance.

Falletta has recorded over 120 albums for such labels as Naxos, featuring works by Brahms, Barber, and Schubert, and women composers such as Fanny Mendelssohn, Clara Schumann, Lili Boulanger, and Germaine Tailleferre, in addition to contemporary composers such as John Corigliano.

In 2025, Omaha Symphony announced Falletta would be the 2025-2026 Principal Guest Conductor and Artistic Advisor.

== Awards ==
JoAnn Falletta won a Grammy Award in 2019 for her work as a conductor in the category of Best Classical Compendium for the Naxos recording of "Fuchs: Piano Concerto 'Spiritualist'; Poems Of Life; Glacier; Rush" with the London Symphony Orchestra. She won her second individual Grammy Award in 2020 as conductor in the category of Best Choral Performance for the Naxos recording of "Richard Danielpour: Passion of Yeshua." Her recording with the Buffalo Philharmonic Orchestra of John Corigliano’s "Mr. Tambourine Man: Seven Poems of Bob Dylan" won two Grammy Awards in 2009. In 2023, she was nominated for a 2024 Grammy Award as conductor of the Buffalo Philharmonic Orchestra in the category of Best Orchestral Performance for her Naxos recording of Scriabin: Symphony No. 2; The Poem of Ecstasy.

Falletta has won a number of conducting awards, including the Seaver/National Endowment for the Arts Conductors Award in 2002, the Bruno Walter Conducting Award in 1982, First Prize in the Stokowski Competition in 1985, the Toscanini Award in 1986, and the Ditson Conductor's Award for the Advancement of American Music in 1998. She has also received eleven awards from ASCAP for creative programming, as well as the American Symphony Orchestra League's John S. Edwards Award.

Falletta has championed the work of several contemporary American composers throughout her career, with an extensive repertoire of new works and over 100 world premieres to her credit. In 2016, Falletta was elected to the American Academy of Arts and Sciences. In Virginia, she was honored as one of the Library of Virginia's "Virginia Women in History" and has also been named “Norfolk Downtowner of the Year” in 2011, received a star on the Norfolk Legends of Music Walk of Fame, and received the “50 for 50 Arts Inspiration Award” from the Virginia Commission for the Arts in 2018.

In 2019, the classical music radio program Performance Today named Falletta its inaugural Classical Woman of the Year.

== Personal ==
Falletta married Robert Alemany in 1986. Alemany is a systems analyst for IBM and part-time professional clarinetist.

Cultural offices
Preceded by Winston Dan Vogel	Music Director, Virginia Symphony Orchestra; 1991–2020	Succeeded by Eric Jacobsen
Preceded by Maximiano Valdés	Music Director, Buffalo Philharmonic Orchestra; 1999–present	Succeeded by incumbent
Preceded by Kenneth Montgomery	Principal Conductor, Ulster Orchestra; 2011–2014	Succeeded by Rafael Payare
