= A Woman Is a Risky Bet: Six Orchestra Conductors =

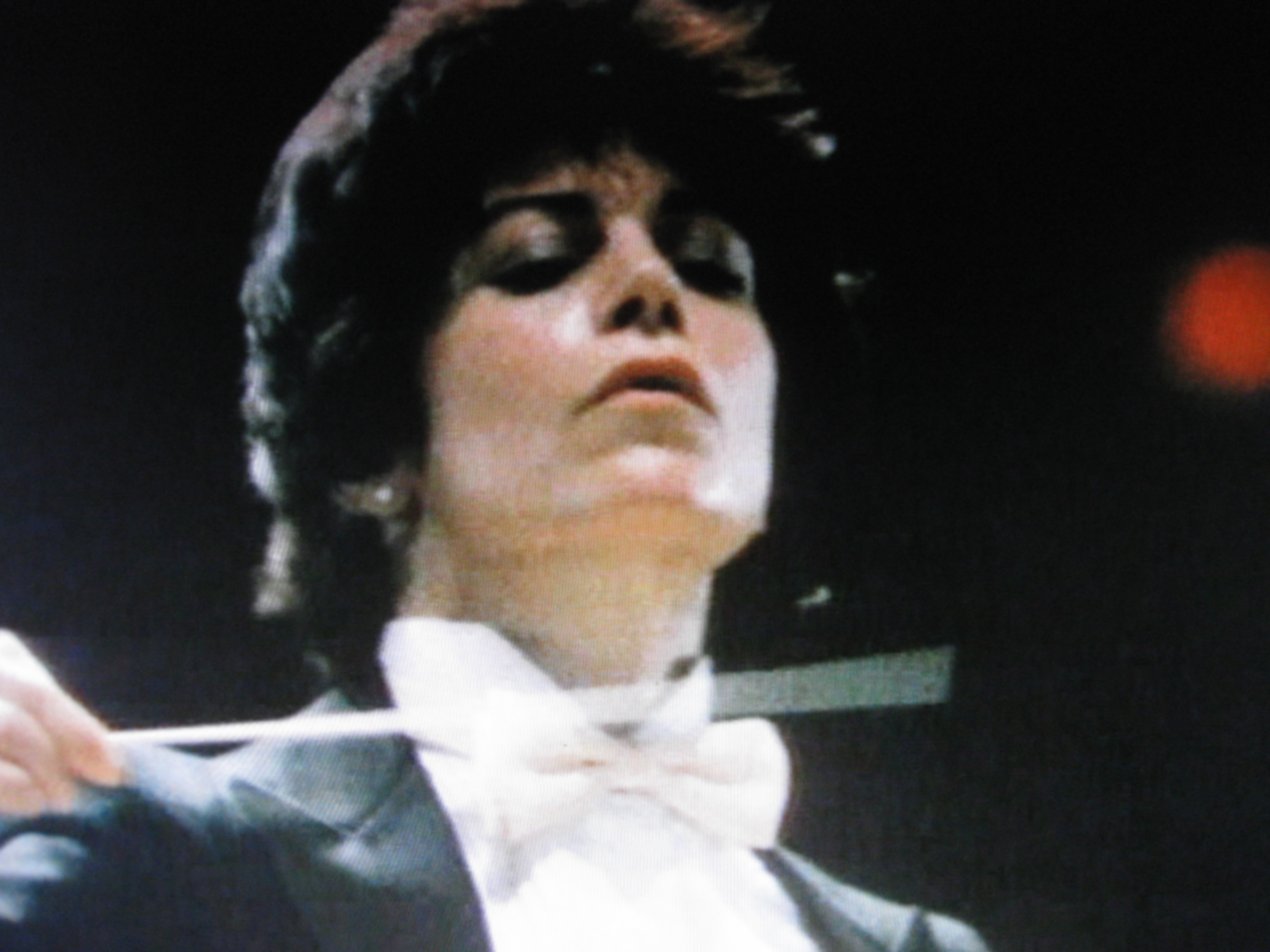
- JoAnn Falletta
- Directed by: Christina Olofson
- Produced by: Christina Olofson / Hagafilm
- Starring: Victoria Bond; Veronika Dudarova; JoAnn Falletta; Camilla Kolchinsky; Ortrud Mann; Kerstin Nerbe
- Cinematography: Lisa Hagstrand
- Edited by: Johanna Hald / Christina Olofson
- Music by: Mozart, Stravinsky, Carl Maria von Weber
- Distributed by: Folkets Bio (Sweden)
- Release date: March 13, 1987 (Sweden)
- Running time: 82 minutes
- Country: Sweden
- Languages: English; Swedish; Russian

A Woman Is a Risky Bet: Six Orchestra Conductors (Swedish: Dirigenterna) is a 1987 Swedish documentary film about women orchestra conductors directed by Christina Olofson.

== Description ==
In A Woman Is a Risky Bet we meet six women who have broken their way into a man's world – the world of conducting.

JoAnn Falletta and Victoria Bond from U.S., Kerstin Nerbe and Ortrud Mann from Sweden, Veronika Dudarova and Camilla Kolchinsky from the USSR share a passion for music and the courage to break with existing values and face challenge. Christina Olofson takes us to New York City, Moscow, Stockholm and Oslo to meet them. The film covers preparations, rehearsals and parts of concerts. At home, alone with the conductor's score, they give us their account of the work of the conductor, of their convictions and their love for music.

The skepticism by some towards women conductors and musicians becomes obvious in a visit to the Vienna Philharmonic Orchestra as well as in interviews with international impresarios. Conductors Sixten Ehrling and Jorge Mester comment on what they believe is the prevailing conservative attitudes among colleagues.

The rehearsal and concert scenes in the film reveal the strengths and weaknesses of the featured conductors; Falletta leading the Queens Philharmonic in Stravinsky's The Rite of Spring, Dudarova with the Moscow State Symphony Orchestra and Choir rehearsing Mozart's Requiem, Nerbe conducting Mozart's Linz Symphony and Kolchinsky directing von Weber's overture to the opera Euryanthe.

"Only poor soldiers don't want to be generals." – Veronika Dudarova

== See also ==
- Antonia: A Portrait of the Woman, a 1974 documentary about the struggles of symphony conductor Antonia Brico against gender bias
