= Masquerade (Khachaturian) =

1941 composition by Aram Khachaturian

- by Aram Khachaturian
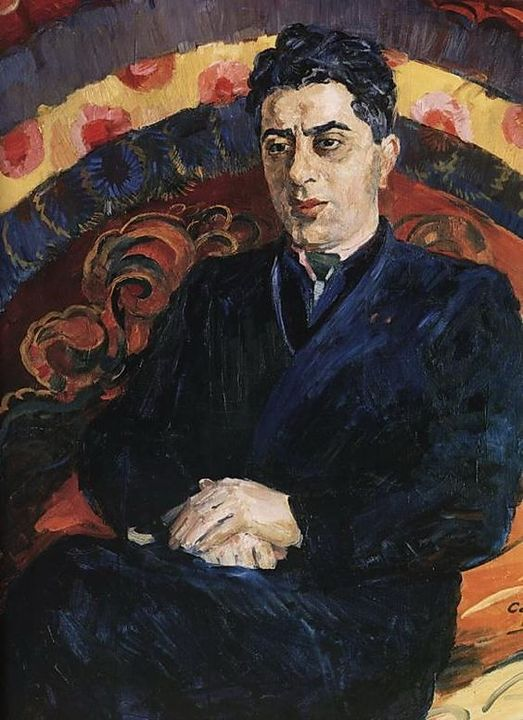
- Portrait of Aram Khachaturian, 1944
- Genre: Incidental music to Mikhail Lermontov's Masquerade
- Composed: 1941 (incidental music); 1944 (suite); 1952 (piano)
- Performed: 21 June 1941: Vakhtangov Theater, Moscow
- Duration: 17–18 minutes
- Movements: Five

Masquerade (Russian: Маскарад) was written by Aram Khachaturian in 1941 as incidental music for a production of Mikhail Lermontov's play of the same name. He turned it into a suite with five movements for an orchestra in 1944. It is best known for the Waltz, widely considered one of Khachaturian's finest and most popular pieces, (Note: "Вальс, открывающий сюиту, — одно из самых ярких произведений Хачатуряна.") second in popularity only to "Sabre Dance" from the ballet Gayane.

== Background ==
Khachaturian was asked to write music for a production of Masquerade being produced by director Ruben Simonov. The famous waltz theme in particular gave Khachaturian much trouble in its creation. His former teacher, Nikolai Myaskovsky, attempted to help Khachaturian by giving him a collection of romances and waltzes from Lermontov's time; though these did not provide immediate inspiration, Khachaturian admitted that "had it not been for the strenuous search" for the appropriate style and melodic inspiration, he would not have discovered the second theme of his waltz which acted "like a magic link, allowing me to pull out the whole chain. The rest of the waltz came to me easily, with no trouble at all." Khachaturian dedicated the waltz to the actress who played Nina, Alla Kazanskaya.

Masquerade premiered on 21 June 1941 at the Vakhtangov Theater in Moscow, directed by Andrei Tutyshkin and starring Iosif Tolchanov as Arbenin and Alla Kazanskaya as Nina. On the following day, Germany invaded the Soviet Union and the production run was cut short. On 23 July 1941 German air-bombing completely destroyed the Vakhtangov Theater, killing many actors and personnel and destroying the elaborate stage decorations. Tutyshkin continued successful performances of Masquerade after evacuation to Siberia.

In the Soviet Union, along with Khachaturian's Violin Concerto and excerpts from the ballet Gayane, the Waltz from Masquerade was often played in concerts and on the radio during World War II.

== Suite ==
In 1944, Khachaturian extracted five movements from the music to make a symphonic suite. The movements are:

1. Waltz
2. Nocturne
3. Mazurka
4. Romance
5. Galop

Waltz, Mazurka, and Galop are dance movements, while Nocturne and Romance are sentimental movements.

== Critical reception ==
The suite is considered a Russian classic and a "certified hit with a strong back catalog." Critics regard it as Khachaturian's finest light music and "best known score of [his] incidental and film music."

In 1948, several recordings of the suite were made in the United States. Billboard wrote that the Masquerade Suite was composed by "Khachaturian, the Russian, brooding, colorful, nationalistically melodic" and not "[Khachaturian], the Armenian, swirling, rattling and temperamentally heady" and that only "Galop" "rings out what presumably is the popular Khachaturian." Maurice Hinson agreed that it "contains little evidence of Khachaturian's Armenian background, as it was written to convey the atmosphere of the Romantic period of the play."

In an early review, Howard Taubman suggested that the Waltz "could have been written by Tchaikovsky", and "only the final section, Galop, has a contemporary tang and it is the most amusing part of the suite." Regarded in the tradition of Tchaikovsky and Glinka, it was deemed "rich in color and melody" by another American critic. Deseret News wrote that "although there is nothing original or particularly great about the 'Masquerade,' it is a lively and attractive suite." The St. Petersburg Times noted that in writing the suite Khachaturian was influenced by Russian composers and called it "swirling [and] flamboyant." It noted that the five pieces are "so different from each other as to mark them as individual entr'actes rather than as an entire suite." It continued, "The graceful melting rhythm predominant in both the 'Waltz' and 'Romance' gives way to wistfulness in the brooding sentiment shadowing the 'Nocturne' and 'Romance' [...] 'Galop,' runs rampant with irresistible joyousness."

Harry van Vugt, a Windsor Star reviewer, opined in 1973 that Khachaturian's Masquerade Suite is written in a "conservative idiom" although by a composer who is still living. He called the Waltz "both burly and deflated", the Mazurka "lighthearted", and the Galop "mercurial". Seth Arenstein described the suite as a "bit of Russian pop" and the Galop as "comically dissonant." Hilary Finch of The Times wrote: "the loudest and longest waltz you'd ever heard, a wild carousel of a mazurka, complete with raspberry-blowing trumpets — and, at its heart, a sophisticated salon nocturne". Steven J. Haller, writing in the American Record Guide, noted that the Waltz has a "glorious sweep, a richness of string sound and texture" that "immediately compels attention." He called the Mazurka "bracing", the Romance "wistful" and the final Galop having a "raucous circus atmosphere and heady high spirits." Daniel Chetel described the Waltz as "fully romantic", the Mazurka as "energetic", and the Galop as "kinetic."

== Waltz ==
The opening Waltz, which runs for around four minutes, has become a popular piece and is often played on its own. Anthony Tommasini described it as "seldom-heard," while Anne Midgette opined that it is "music that you know even if you think you don't." Irakly Andronikov, a scholar of Lermontov, praised it as a "culmination of romantic waltz-like essence, its quintessence." Writing for BBC Music Magazine, David Nice argued that the Waltz is "up there with the best of Prokofiev's". Khachaturian's waltz evokes the atmosphere of an early 19th-century ballroom while adding "a large dash of menace." Rather than a light Viennese dance, it unfolds as a richly ornamented and weighty piece, animated by an "engaging carousel flavour".

Critics have characterized it as "slightly menacing", "circusy", "lush and slightly portentous", "weighty, boisterous, and energetic", "heavy and borderline militaristic", and as having "visceral edginess." It has been listed as a "spooky" piece of classical music. Jay Nordlinger has described the waltz as "spooky, haunting, marvelous", and "dark, Halloweeny", while Charles Lavazzi said it has a "tinge of darkness" to it. Baldwin called the opening passage by the cellos "haunting." Consequently, it has often been recommended for (Note: "Directors will want to consider adding this famous Khachaturian waltz to a Halloween concert.") and played in Halloween concerts in the United States.

Jim Waddelow recommended the waltz for both teachers and students of string instruments: "Students will like this hypnotic tune, and this is a great intermediate piece for the teacher who wants to introduce a waltz style." He also wrote that it is a "great piece for a director who wants to work style."

The Waltz was performed at Khachaturian's funeral service in May 1978 by the Russian State Symphony Orchestra, conducted by Yevgeny Svetlanov, at the Moscow Conservatory's Grand Hall.

== Piano and flute arrangements ==
Khachaturian offered a solo piano arrangement in 1952, but earlier, in 1946, he had approved Alexander Doloukhanian's version for solo piano.

The first two movements, Waltz and Nocturne, were arranged for violin and piano by Mikhail Fichtenholz and Khachaturian respectively.

In 1986 Irish flautist James Galway made a flute transcription of the Waltz along with other works of Khachaturian.

== Ballet ==
Based on Khachaturian's suite, in 1982 Edgar Oganesian composed music for a ballet in three acts with a libretto by Lydia Vilvovskaya, Mikhail Dolgopolov, Natalia Ryzhenko, and Viktor Smirnov. It premiered at the Odesa Opera and Ballet Theatre. Oganesian, a former student of Khachaturian, used his other works, including Symphony No. 2, the Sonata-Fantasy for cello solo, and the Suite for Two Pianos for the ballet.

In 1985 a film was produced by Studio Ekran based on the ballet starring Nikita Dolgushin and Svetlana Smirnova as Nina. At 64 minutes long, it featured the Alexander Spendiaryan Opera and Ballet National Theatre of Yerevan under the direction of Hakob Ter-Voskanian. It was released by Video Artists International (VAI) on DVD in 2007. Lawrence Hansen, reviewing for American Record Guide, noted that Khachaturian' suite is less than 20 minutes long and "much of the other music is arrangements of the catchy, slightly menacing Waltz that opens the suite, including one stretch with a choral vocalise added. Pretty music, but it outstays its welcome."

== In art and culture ==
=== Inspirations ===
The "grim-sounding waltz" opening the ballet Seven Beauties (1948) by the Soviet Azerbaijani composer Kara Karayev has "predictable suggestions of Khachaturian" and "sounds like" the Waltz from his Masquerade.

The English-Australian instrumental rock band Sky covered the Waltz in their 1982 single "Masquerade" from their album Sky 4: Forthcoming.

The score, written by Edmund Butt, of the 2013 television film An Adventure in Space and Time, dedicated to the 50th anniversary of the British sci-fi TV series Doctor Who, was inspired by Khachaturian's Waltz. It was suggested by the writer Mark Gatiss, who described it "as having the feel of 'the whirligig of Time'. Romantic, bright but with a slightly off-kilter, out of control feel – like the TARDIS."

=== Use on screen ===
The Waltz was often played on Soviet television on New Year's Eve. In the West, it has been used in a number of films and series, including the 1990 art film The Children, the 1991 romantic comedy Only the Lonely, War and Peace, a 2007 French-Italian miniseries inspired by Leo Tolstoy's novel, the 2014 romantic fantasy Winter's Tale, the 2019 biopic Halston, and the British TV series Fleabag in Episode 3 of Series 2 (2019).

=== Use elsewhere ===
Besides film and television, the Waltz has been used in diverse artistic expressions, such as:

- Viktor, a 1986 dance theater piece by German choreographer Pina Bausch.
- A pièce d'occasion for Nina Ananiashvili by Artist in Residence Alexei Ratmansky at the 2009 Spring Gala of American Ballet Theatre.
- A 2010 concert entitled "Aerialists, Athletes and Arpeggios" by The Little Orchestra Society in New York, where acrobats performed on aerial silks and a rhythmic gymnast did a ribbon solo.
- A 2019 Jean Paul Gaultier advertisement for the fragrance "Scandal a Paris" starring the model Irina Shayk.

== In sports ==
The Waltz was among the pieces of classical music featured during the opening ceremony of the Winter Olympics in Sochi, Russia on February 7, 2014, along with "Sabre Dance", another work of Khachaturian.

In recent decades, the Waltz has become popular with figure skaters with notable performers dancing to it, most prominently Mao Asada, Tatiana Volosozhar and Maxim Trankov, Johnny Weir, and Evgenia Medvedeva.

== Recordings ==
In 1954, Khachaturian recorded the Waltz, Nocturne, and Mazurka from the Suite, conducting the Philharmonia Orchestra for Columbia Records (also recording some of his other scores in the same sessions).

- 1948, Philharmonic Symphony Orchestra of New York, Leopold Stokowski (Columbia MM-729, 3-12" Records)
- 1948, Boston Pops, Arthur Fiedler (RCA Victor 12-0209)
- 1953, Indianapolis Symphony Orchestra, Fabien Sevitzky, Capitol Records
- 1953, USSR State Radio Symphony Orchestra, Samuil Samosud, Melodiya CM0436970
- 1955, Prague Radio Symphony Orchestra, Aram Khachaturian
- 1955, Philharmonic Symphony Orchestra Of New York, Andre Kostelanetz, Columbia CL758
- 1957, Moscow State Symphony Orchestra, Gennady Rozhdestvensky, Monitor Records MCS2078
- 1958, RCA Victor Symphony Orchestra, Kirill Kondrashin (CD), RCA 09026 63302 2
- 1960, Berlin Radio Symphony Orchestra, Horst Stein, Eterna
- 1969, Moscow Radio Symphony Orchestra, Aram Khachaturian, Russian Disc RD CD 11005
- 1973, Brno Philharmonic, Jiří Bělohlávek
- 1978, London Symphony Orchestra, Stanley Black, Decca 4830393
- 1981, London Symphony Orchestra, Loris Tjeknavorian, RCA 82876658362
- 1985, USSR State Radio Symphony Orchestra, Karen Khachaturian, Audiophile APL101516
- 1987, Royal Scottish National Orchestra, Neeme Järvi (CD), Chandos CHAN 8542
- 1987, Moscow State Symphony Orchestra, Veronika Dudarova, Melodiya MEL CD 1000036
- 1991, Armenian Philharmonic Orchestra, Loris Tjeknavorian (CD), ASV CDDCA 773
- 1993, Moscow Radio Symphony Orchestra, Vladimir Fedoseyev, Musica Classic 7800122
- 1994, Saint Petersburg State Symphony Orchestra, André Anichanov, Naxos 8.550802 | Naxos 8.554054
- 2001, Philharmonia of Russia, Constantine Orbelian, Delos DE3288 | Naxos.com
- 2020, Zagreb Philharmonic Orchestra, Dmitri Kitayenko, Oehms Classics OC471 | Naxos.com
