= Kolchinsky =

Kolchinsky or Kolchynskyy (Ukrainian: Колчинський; Russian: Колчинский) is a surname. The female form of the surname is Kolchinskaya (Russian: Кольчинская). Notable people with this surname include:

- Aleksandr Kolchinsky (1955–2002), Soviet Ukrainian wrestler
- Camilla Kolchinsky (1931–2016), Russian Jewish conductor
