= Sixten Ehrling =

Swedish conductor and pianist

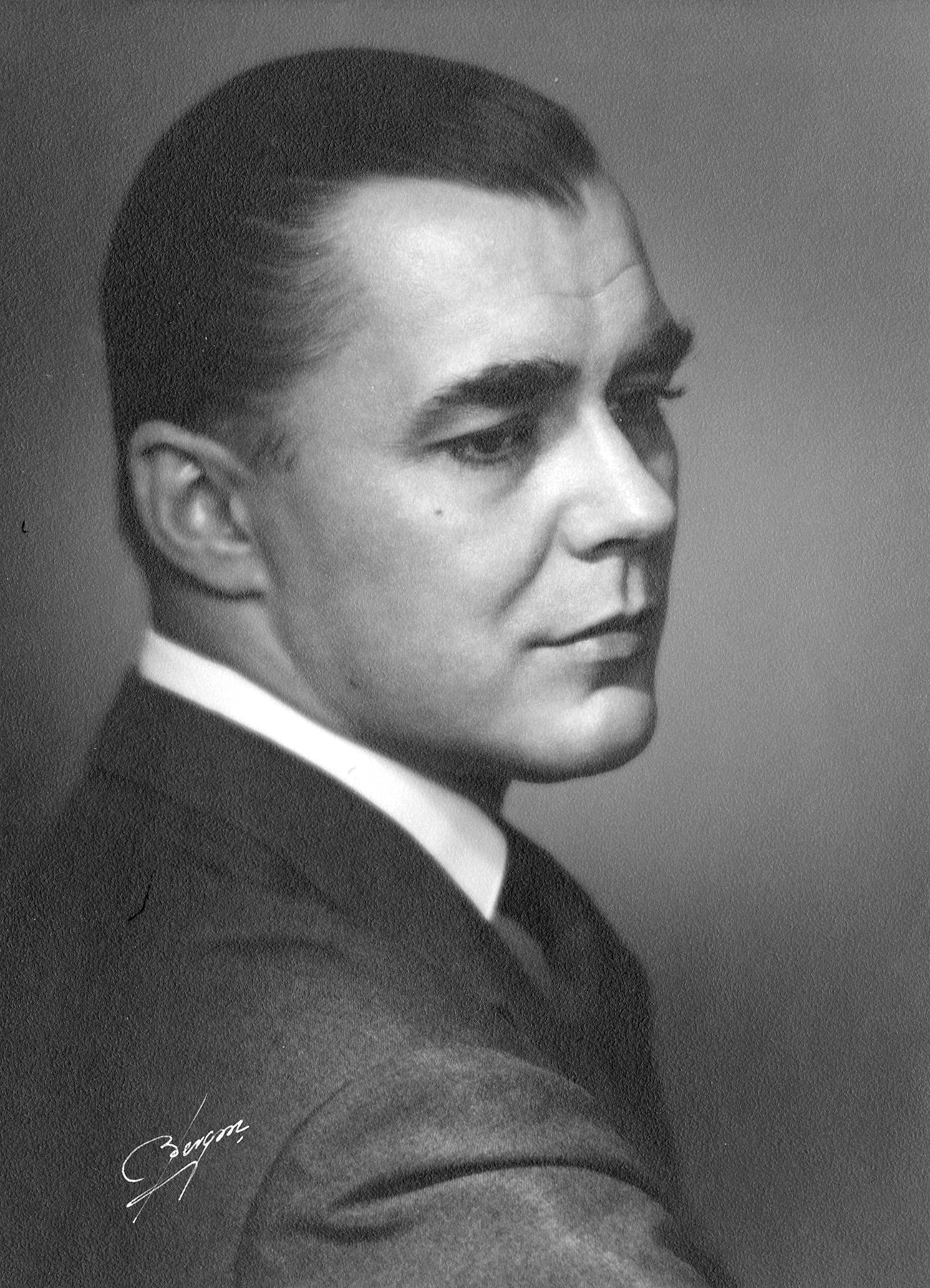
- The Swedish conductor Sixten Ehrling (c. 1960)
- Born: Sixten Ehrling; 3 April 1918; Malmö, Sweden
- Died: 13 February 2005 (aged 86); New York City, United States
- Education: Royal College of Music, Stockholm
- Occupations: Conductor, pianist
- Known for: Conducting at the Royal Swedish Opera and the Metropolitan Opera
- Spouse: Gunnel Lindgren

Evert Sixten Ehrling (3 April 1918 – 13 February 2005) was a Swedish conductor and pianist who, during a long career, served as the music director of the Royal Swedish Opera and the principal conductor of the Detroit Symphony Orchestra, amongst others.

== Biography ==
Ehrling was born in Malmö, Sweden, the son of a banker. From the age of 18 he attended the Royal Swedish Academy of Music in Stockholm. At the academy he studied the violin, organ, and piano as well as conducting. During World War II, he studied under both Karl Böhm and Albert Wolff.

He made his public debut as a conductor with the Royal Stockholm Philharmonic in 1950, conducting Igor Stravinsky's "The Rite of Spring" from memory. In 1953 Ehrling was named the music director of the Royal Swedish Opera, a post he held until 1960. During these years he worked closely with the acclaimed singers tenor Jussi Björling and soprano Birgit Nilsson. In the early 1950s Ehrling recorded the first complete set of Sibelius symphonies with the Stockholm orchestra. In 1959 Ehrling took the production of Aniara, composed by Karl-Birger Blomdahl, to the Edinburgh International Festival.

Ehrling's tenure with the Swedish Royal Opera ended in bitterness. He resigned his post and departed for the United States after he was asked to amend, and apologise for, his robust leadership style. In 1963 Ehrling replaced the departing Paul Paray as the principal conductor of the Detroit Symphony Orchestra. During his time in Detroit, the composer Luciano Berio had a brief residency. Ehrling was, perhaps, the perfect journeyman conductor. He could, and did, conduct everything well: opera, symphonic and choral music. He had perfect sympathy to style and period in whatever he conducted, focusing the attention on the music rather than himself. Unlike Leonard Bernstein or Leopold Stokowski, however, he did not take the role of innovator on the podium.

Maestro Ehrling conducted nearly 700 works, including 24 world premieres, and helped inaugurate the Meadow Brook Summer Music Festival. In 1973, he made his Metropolitan Opera debut, where he conducted 12 different operas, including Wagner's "Ring Cycle." He led 55 orchestras and ensembles in North and South America, and countless orchestras around the world, during his celebrated five decade career.

Ehrling also taught at the Juilliard School of Music between 1973 and 1987. At Juilliard, Ehrling nurtured a new wave of conductors, including Myung-Whun Chung, JoAnn Falletta, Christian Badea, Victoria Bond, and Andrew Litton.

He was awarded the Illis quorum in 1988 and the honorary title of professor (Professors namn) in 1982.

Maestro Ehrling's difficult personality was overshadowed only by his wit. "Someone once told me I was not difficult, I was impossible. I agreed," he confided to Detroit Free Press music critic John Guinn on July 1, 1990. He told his American publicist that he preferred reading his reviews in the smallest room of his house, and brilliantly interwove business arrangements with extremely humorous observations.

"In his final interview with Guinn, he noted that "They had a ceremony In Sweden for my birthday recently, and the man giving the birthday tribute had a great line. 'Mr. Ehrling nowadays is not angry,' he said. Then he paused, 'All the time,' he added."

Ehrling was one of the last conductors to know both Stravinsky and Sibelius, personally. When he discovered mistakes in their manuscripts, they were immediately informed.

In 1987 Ehrling participated in the documentary A Woman Is a Risky Bet: Six Orchestra Conductors directed by Christina Olofson where he comments on the conservative attitudes towards women in the world of classical music.

Sixten Ehrling died on February 13, 2005, in New York, where he had lived since the 1970s. He was married to a former Stockholm opera ballerina, Gunnel Lindgren. They had two daughters.
