= Dudarova =

Dudarova may refer to:

- Veronika Dudarova (1916–2009), Russian conductor
- 9737 Dudarova, main-belt asteroid named after Veronika Dudarova
