= Pavel Weymarn =

Russian writer on music and composer

Pavel Platonovich Weymarn (Note: Also Paul von Weymarn) (Russian: Па́вел Плато́нович Ве́ймарн, romanized: Pavel Platonovich Veymarn; 1857 – 23 September [O.S. 10 September] 1905) was a Russian writer on music and composer.

== Early life ==
Weymarn was born in Saint Petersburg and studied at the First Saint Petersburg Gymnasium. He served in the Semyonovsky Life Guards Regiment and left the army in 1888. He studied piano with Karel van Ark and theory with Konstantin Galler and Andrey Kazbiryuk at the Saint Petersburg Conservatory.

== Career ==
From 1888 to 1890, Weymarn edited the music journal Bayan. He was a music critic for various publications. Weymarn was the author of some articles in the Russian edition of Riemann Musiklexikon and the Great Encyclopedia edited by Yuzhakov. Some of his articles were also published in the Russian Musical Gazette.

As a music critic, he was distinguished by his progressive view and insight into music. Weymarn also composed piano pieces, cello pieces, a string quartet, and songs set to texts by Aleksey Apukhtin, Fyodor Berg, etc. Weymarn wrote a number of books, all in Russian, including:

- M. I. Glinka (co-authored with Count Obolensky; 1886)
- Summary of the History of the Opera "A Life for the Tsar" (1886)
- E. F. Napravnik (1889)
- M. I. Glinka, a Biographical Sketch (1892)
- César Cui as a Composer of Songs (1897)

== Death ==
He died in Narva on 23 September 1905. Other sources give his death date as 22 September.
