= Dmitri Kogan =

Dmitri Kogan Дмитрий Павлович Коган
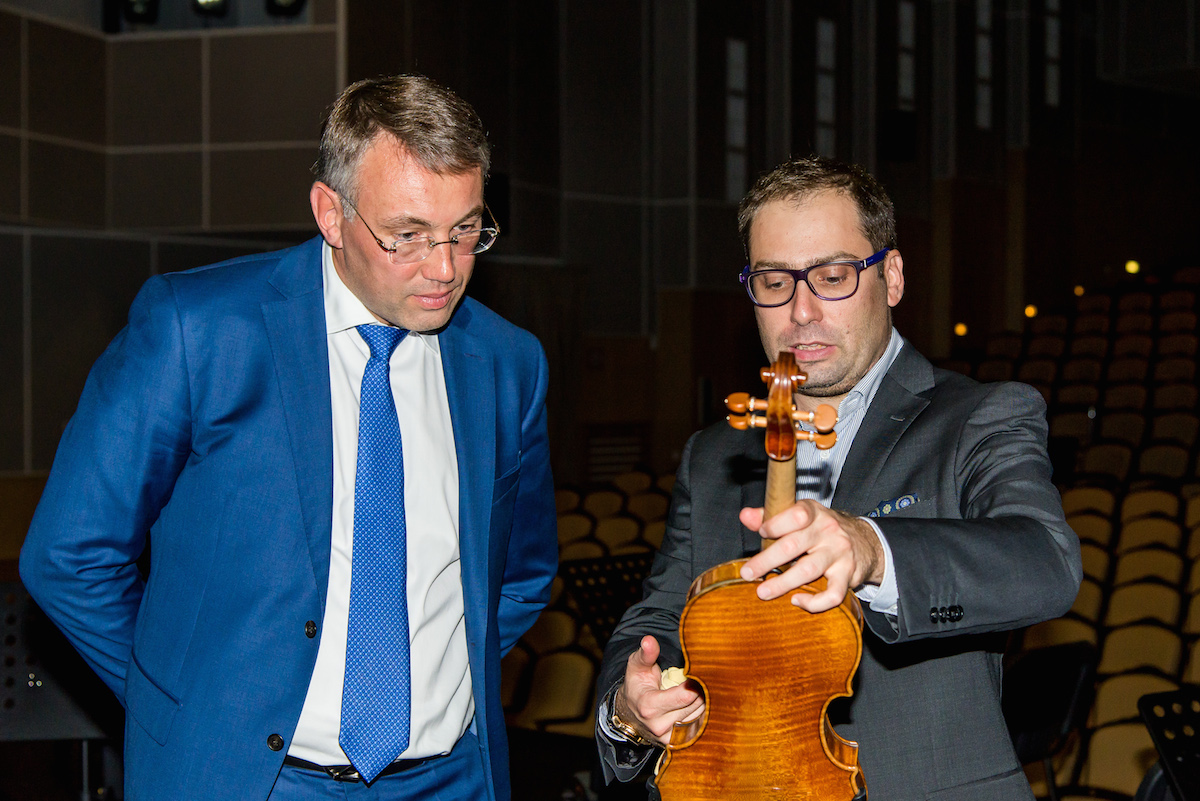

Background information
- Born: October 27, 1978; Moscow, USSR
- Origin: Moscow
- Died: August 29, 2017 (aged 38)
- Genre: Classical
- Occupation: Violinist
- Instrument: Violin
- Website: dmitrikogan.ru

Dmitri Pavlovich Kogan (Russian: Дмитрий Павлович Коган; October 27, 1978 – August 29, 2017) was a Russian violinist and an Honoured Artist of the Russian Federation.

== Early life and career ==
Dmitri Kogan was born in Moscow, USSR, into a famous musical dynasty.

His grandfather, Leonid Kogan, was an outstanding violinist, his grandmother, Elizabeth Gilels – a famous violinist and a teacher, his father, Pavel Kogan, is a conductor, and his mother, Lyubov Kazinskaya, a pianist who graduated from the Gnessin Russian Academy of Music.

He began playing the violin at the age of 6 at the Central Music School of the Moscow State P.I. Tchaikovsky Conservatory.

From 1996 to 1999 Kogan was a student at the Moscow Conservatory (the class of I.S. Bezrodny) and almost at the same time (1996–2000) he was a student at the Sibelius Academy in Helsinki, Finland, studying with I.S. Bezrodny and Tuomas Haapanen.

At the age of 10 Dmitri performed for the first time accompanied by a symphony orchestra, and when he was 15 he played with an orchestra in the Grand Hall of the Moscow Conservatory.

== Performance career ==
Kogan made his debut in Great Britain and the US in 1997. He regularly performed at the most prestigious concert halls of Europe, Asia, America, Australia, Middle East, the CIS and the Baltic countries.

Kogan participated at many prestigious music festivals around the world, such as the Corinthian Summer Festival (Austria), Menton Music Festival (France), Montreux Jazz Festival (Switzerland), and Perth Festival (Scotland). He also participated in the Chereshnevy Les Open-Art Festival, Russian Winter (Russkaya Zima) Festival, Music Kremlin Festival, Andrey Sakharov International Art Festival and many others in places like Athens, Vilnius, Shanghai, Ogden, Utah, and Helsinki.

Niccolò Paganini's cycle of 24 caprices, long considered impossible to perform, held a special place in Kogan's repertoire, which consisted mostly of great concertos for violin and orchestra. Only a few select violinists are capable of performing the whole cycle.

On April 19, 2009, Kogan was the first violinist to play a concert for explorers at the North Pole.

On January 15, 2010, Kogan was awarded the honorary title of Honoured Artist of the Russian Federation.

The Kogan Fund for Support of Outstanding Cultural Projects was created in April 2011 by Kogan and a patron of arts, Chair of the AVS-group Holding Company, Valery Saveliev.

The public phase of the first project promoted by the Fund was Kogan's concert in the Pillar Hall of the House of the Unions on May 26, 2011. He played five violins by Stradivari, Guarneri, Amati, Guadagnini and Vuillaume. He continued the show, "Five Great Violins in One Concert", at the top concert venues in Russia and abroad. In January 2013, he performed it at the World Economic Forum in Davos in the presence of the Prime-Minister of Russia Dmitri Medvedev and representatives of the world's political and business elites.

The Robrecht violin, created in 1728 by Bartolomeo Giuseppe Antonio Guarneri (delGesù), a renowned luthier of Cremona, was purchased by the Fund and presented to Kogan in Milan on September 1, 2011.

In 2015, Kogan presented a new project, accompanying his performance of The Four Seasons by Vivaldi and Astor Piazzolla with video projection.

Kogan released ten CDs in collaboration with Delos, Conforza, DV Classics and other record labels.

== Social and charity activities ==
Kogan dedicated great effort to charity and supported campaigns for children and youth.

In December 2002 the First Leonid Kogan International Festival took place with Dmitri being its organizer and artistic director.

Kogan was the founder and artistic director of the Annual International Days of High Music Festival that takes place in Vladivostok and since 2005 it has been also held on Sakhalin. From 2004 to 2005 Kogan was the general artistic director of Primorsk State Philharmonic Society. From September 2005 he was the chairman of the board of Regents of Sakhalin State Philharmonic Society.

In December 2007 Kogan founded and became the Head of the International Kogan Festival in Yekaterinburg. In August 2010 he was elected as an Honorary Professor of the Athens Conservatoire. He held the post of Artistic Director at the Samara State Philharmonic Hall in the period from 2011 to 2013. In October 2010 Kogan became the chairman of the board of Regents of the Ural Music College.

The Kogan Fund for Support of Outstanding Cultural Projects was created in April 2011 thanks to efforts of Kogan and a patron of arts, Chair of the AVS-group Holding Company, Valery Saveliev. The main goal of the Fund is the continued development of the world class charity and art patronage traditions of Russia. The Fund intends to search for unique musical instruments and to have them restored by the best art conservators and then to hand them over to professional musicians. Further, the Fund plans to help meet theneeds of musical schools and colleges, to find and support young talents.

Kogan was an Adviser on Cultural Affairs to the Governor of Chelyabinsk Oblast from 2011 to 2014.

In April 2012 Kogan chaired the board of regents at the Urals Mussorgsky State Conservatoire together with Metropolitan Hilarion of Volokolamsk.

In March 2012 Kogan became a confidant of Vladimir Putin, the President of the Russian Federation.

Kogan was an honorary professor of the Athens Conservatoire and the Urals State Conservatoire, Ulyanovsk State University, and chairman of the board of Regents of the Ural Musical College.

From April 2013 onwards he chaired the International Musical Kremlin Festival that was founded by Nikolay Petrov, a prominent Russian pianist and Kogan's friend and mentor.

From June 2013 he was an advisor on Cultural Affairs to the Governor of Vladimir Oblast.

In February 2014 Kogan was appointed Artistic Director of one of Moscow's leading musical collectives – the Moscow Camerata Chamber Orchestra.

In September 2014 the maestro was an Artistic Director of the First Arctic Classical Music Fest in the Nenets Autonomous Okrug. In September 2014 he was appointed as the Counsellor for Cultural Affairs to the Governor of the Nenets Autonomous Okrug.

== Projects and festivals ==
The Time of High Music

In April 2013 Kogan recorded a charity album titled 'The Time of High Music' in the Pillar Hall of the House of the Unions in Moscow.

Over 30,000 copies of the album were donated to music schools, children's art schools, colleges and higher education institutions in all 83 subjects of the Russian Federation. The Time of High Music, the violinist's charity tour across the 83 subjects of the Russian Federation, began in Tver on June 15, 2013.

Musical Instruments for Children

A charity concert by Honoured Artist of the Russian Federation Dmitri Kogan took place at the Grand Hall of the Moscow State Conservatory on December 21, 2013. The renowned violinist performed together with chamber and symphonic orchestras as well as students from music schools from various region of Russia as part of the framework of the all-Russia Time of High Music charity project. He personally presented young talented musicians with instruments made by the best European artisans. Kogan was engaged in charity activities for many years. He was the first violinist to give charity concerts in Beslan and in Nevelsk damaged by an earthquake. Charitable actions organized by Kogan often turned into significant events of great cultural and social importance.

Five Great Violins

Kogan began working on this cultural project in the spring of 2011. During these themedf concert event Kohan played Five great musical instruments made by the legendary louthiers of the past – Amati, Stradivari, Guarneri, Guadagnini and Vuillaume.

Nikolay Petrov's International Musical Kremlin Festival

The International Musical Kremlin Festival was founded in 2000 by Nikolay Petrov – the piano virtuoso, teacher, professor and public figure. The festival has been borne the name of the untimely deceased musician since 2012.

The festival is held at its permanent venue, the Armoury Chamber of the Moscow Kremlin. Beginning in April 2013 the festival was chaired by Kogan who was Petrov's friend and student.

International Days of High Music Festival

The International Days of High Music Festival was founded by Kogan in Vladivostok in 2004. Since then it has been held successfully in Sakhalin, Khabarovsk, Chelyabinsk, and Samara. Prominent musicians and leading musical collectives are usually the guests at Days of High Music.

Church Music Festival

The Volzhsky Church Music Festival was founded by Kogan and Metropolitan Hilarion of Volokolamsk in Samara in 2012. This festival introduces its audience to the best samples of choral pieces and oratorios. A number of world premieres have taken place at the festival.

Volga Philharmonic Chamber Orchestra

The Volga Philharmonic Chamber Orchestra of the Samara State Philharmonic Society was founded upon Kogan's initiative in 2011.

The Moscow Camerata Chamber Orchestra

The Moscow Camerata Chamber Orchestra was founded in late 1994 and has been acknowledged as one of Moscow's leading musical collectives. In February 2014 Kogan was appointed Artistic Director of the Moscow Camerata Chamber Orchestra.

Arctic Classical MusicFest

The Arctic Classical Music Fest was founded in 2014 by Kogan and Igor Koshin, Governor of the Nenets Autonomous Okrug. The goal of the festival is to present the best examples of classical music and high art to people living in the Russia's Far North. The Festival is held on an annual basis.

International Kogan Festival

The International Kogan Festival was held by Dmitri Kogan together with the government of Yaroslavl Oblast and Valentina Tereshkova's Fund. Concerts of the festival have so far been held at the largest venues of Yaroslavl and Yaroslavl Oblast. Dmitri Kogan presented concerts of different styles and genres from authentic baroque music to experimental combinations of music and modern technologies.

== Personal life ==
Dmitri Kogan was married to Xenia Chilingarova, the daughter of a polar explorer and deputy of the State Duma Artur Chilingarov from 2009 to 2012.

Kogan died on August 29, 2017, after a prolonged battle with cancer. He was 38.

== Discography ==
- 2002 Brahms. Three sonatas for violin and piano.
- 2005 Shostakovich. The two violin concertos.
- 2006 Two violins.
- 2007 The violin sonatas by Brahms and Frank. Pieces for violin and piano.
- 2008 Virtuoso pieces for violin and piano.
- 2009 CD dedicated to the 65th Anniversary of the Victory in the Great Patriotic War.
- 2010 Compositions for violin and chamber orchestra.
- 2013 "Five Great Violins" (Russian edition)
- 2013 "Five Great Violins" (foreign edition)
- 2013 "Time of High Music". Charitable CD.
