= Nikolai Anosov =

Soviet conductor (1900–1962)

To be distinguished from Anosov Nikolai Pavlovich (1835–1890), head engineer of Amur District.

Nikolai Pavlovich Anosov (Russian: Никола́й Па́влович Ано́сов; 17 February [O.S. 5 February] 1900 – 2 December 1962) was a Soviet conductor and pedagogue who conducted the Moscow State Symphony Orchestra (МГАСО) after Lev Steinberg. He was the father of Gennady Rozhdestvensky, who adopted the maiden name of his mother, soprano Natalya Rozhdestvenskaya in its masculine form to avoid the appearance of nepotism when making his own career, and the painter P. N. Anosov.

Anosov was born in Borisoglebsk, then in the Tambov Governorate, today in the Voronezh Oblast, where his father was a manager at the Volga-Kama Bank, and Nikolai received music lessons at home. After graduating from the Alexander High School in Borisoglebsk in 1918 he entered the Petrovsko-Razumovskaya Agricultural University in Moscow, but volunteered in the Red Army, and at the end of the year, as a cadet of the First Artillery School, participated in the suppression of the Kronstadt rebellion. Because of his facility with foreign languages (French, English and German), Anosov was sent to work in the Ministry of Foreign Affairs dealing with foreign aid agencies.

Only in the mid-1920s did he commit his interests to music, taking a position as pianist-accompanist in the Stanislavsky Opera Studio, then in 1928 in the Moscow Philharmonic, while studying music theory with Professor Andrei Fedorovich Mutli, and composition with Anatoly Nikolayevich Alexandrov, then in the opera section of the Radiokomitet.

Although not officially qualified as a conductor in 1930 he replaced the scheduled, but indisposed, conductor of Christoph Willibald Gluck's opera Orfeo ed Euridice on the radio, as a result of which Anosov was officially granted status as a conductor. From 1937 to 1938 he was the chief conductor of the Symphony Orchestra of Rostov-on-Don, from 1938 to 1940 of the Philharmonic Symphony Orchestra of Azerbaijan on the invitation of Uzeyir Hajibeyov (1885–1948). From 1938 Anosov taught at Baku. During the Second World War, from 1941 to 1944 he was artistic director of the Front-line Opera VTO, during which time also, in 1943, he graduated in composition from the Moscow Conservatory as an external student.

From 1944 to 1949 he was chief conductor of the Opera Studio of the Moscow Conservatory, where he promoted awareness of early Russian opera, conducting in 1947 Yevstigney Fomin's opera The Coachmen ("Ямщики на подставе", premiered 1787) and Dmitri Bortniansky's Le Fils-Rival, ou La Moderne Stratonice ("Сын-соперник", premiered 1787), neither of which had been heard since their premieres. In 1951 he was made a Meritorious Artist of the RSFSR, published a textbook to reading symphonic music, and was appointed a professor at the Moscow Conservatory. Anosov continued to conduct, touring Poland, Czechoslovakia, Hungary, and other countries. He died in Moscow, aged 62.

== Recordings, and Archive of All-Union Radio ==
A complete listing of the recordings of Anosov in Russian or English has yet to be made, and the majority of his recordings lie unexplored in the Archive of All-Union Radio. He was the first performer of many works of Soviet composers and a significant number of operas.

- Great Russian Conductors The Art of Nikolai Anosov. Prokofiev: Symphony no 7, etc. Arlecchino ARL 113-114
