= Volgograd Conservatory =

- Волгоградская государственная консерватория имени П. А. Серебрякова
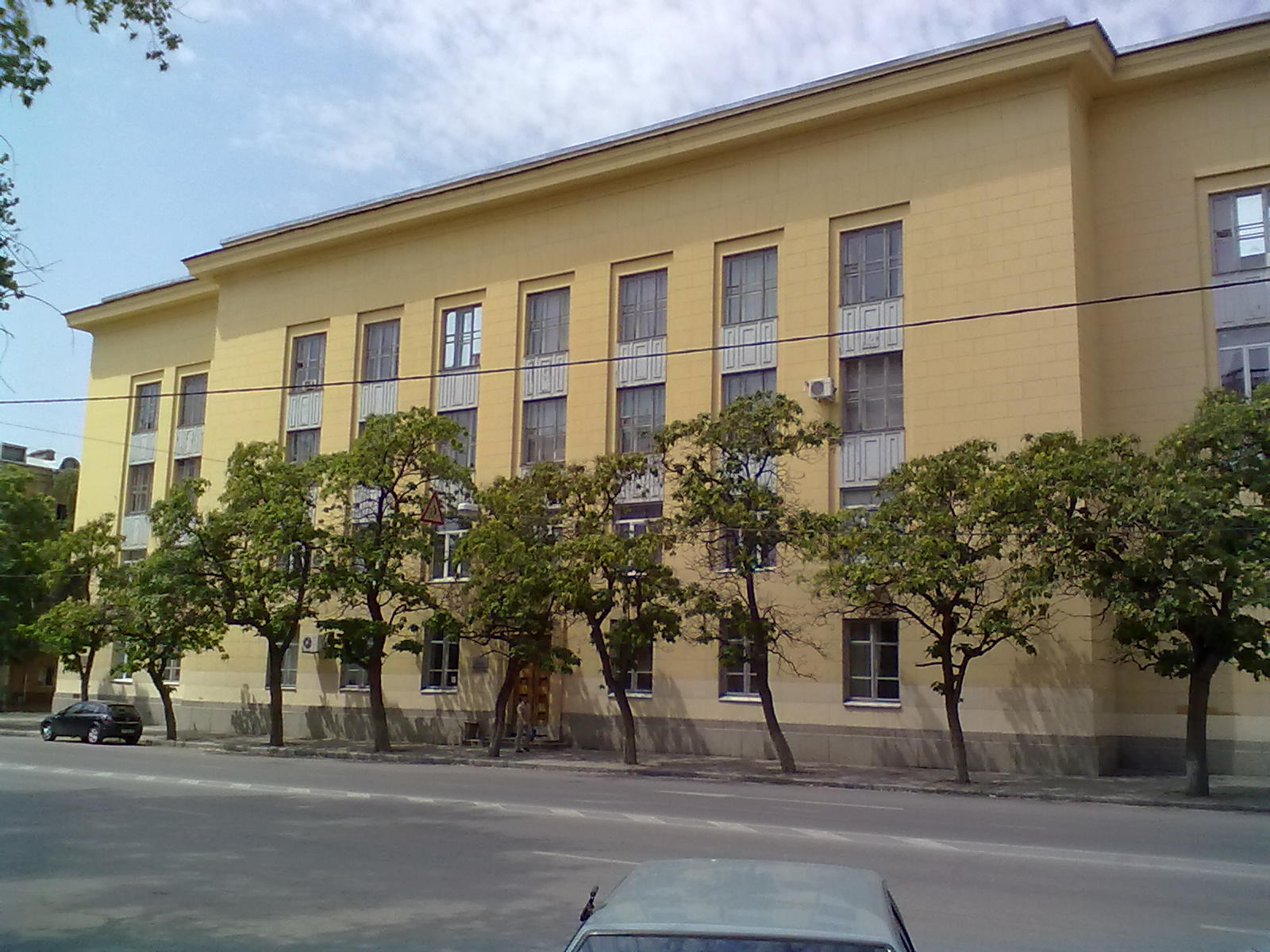
- Established: 1917
- Rector: Osadchaya Olga Yurievna
- Location: Volgograd, Russia; 48.7071°N 44.5115°E
- Website: http://new.serebryakovka.ru/

State Budgetary Educational Institution of Higher Education "Volgograd State Conservatory named after P. A. Serebryakov" (Russian: Государственное бюджетное образовательное учреждение высшего образования «Волгоградская государственная консерватория имени П. А. Серебрякова») is one of the Russian conservatories, a higher educational institution of arts in the city of Volgograd. It is named after the Soviet pianist Pavel Serebryakov.

== History ==
The Volgograd Conservatory traces its history back to music classes that opened on January 6, 1911, in Tsaritsyn. They were located in a building on the corner of Moskovskaya and Astrakhanskaya streets. They included training in three specialties: violin, cello and piano. The tuition fee was 80 rubles per year.

The work of the school was interrupted by the Great Patriotic War. It resumed work only in 1957.

== Names ==
The Volgograd Conservatory had the following official names and organizational-legal forms:

- 1917 to 1923 — Tsaritsyn Music School
- 1923 to 1936 — Stalingrad Music College
- 1936 to 1961 — Stalingrad Music School
- 1961 to 1963 — Volgograd Music School (due to the renaming of Stalingrad to Volgograd)
- 1963 to 1989 — Volgograd School of Arts
- 1989 to 1994 — Volgograd School of Arts named after P. A. Serebryakov
- 1994 to 1996 — Volgograd Higher Municipal School of Arts (College of Arts) named after P. A. Serebryakov
- 1996 to 2001 — Volgograd Municipal Institute of Arts named after P. A. Serebryakov
- 2001 to 2003 — Municipal Educational Institution of Higher Professional Education (MEI HPE) "Volgograd Institute of Arts named after P. A. Serebryakov"
- 2013 to 2015 — Municipal Educational Institution of Higher Professional Education (MEI HPE) "Volgograd Conservatory (Institute) named after P. A. Serebryakov"
- 2015 to 2024 — Municipal Budgetary Educational Institution of Higher Education "Volgograd Conservatory (Institute) named after P. A. Serebryakov"
- Since 2024 — State Budgetary Educational Institution of Higher Education "Volgograd State Conservatory named after P. A. Serebryakov"

== Structure ==
The structure of the conservatory consists of the Faculty of Higher Professional Education, the Faculty of Secondary Professional Education, and the Faculty of Additional Professional Education.

Faculty of Higher Professional Education

The Faculty of Higher Education includes the following departments:

- Department of Piano Performance
- Department of String Instruments
- Department of Wind and Percussion Instruments
- Department of Folk Instruments
- Department of Vocal Arts
- Department of Conducting
- Department of Pop and Jazz Music
- Department of Music History and Theory

Faculty of Secondary Professional Education

The Faculty of Secondary Professional Education includes the following subject-cycle commissions:

- SCC "Piano"
- SCC "String Bowed Instruments"
- SCC "Wind and Percussion Instruments"
- SCC "Folk Instruments"
- SCC "Vocal Arts"
- SCC "Choral Conducting"
- SCC "Solo and Choral Folk Singing"
- SCC "Music Arts of the Stage"
- SCC "Music Theory"
- SCC "General Piano"
- SCC "Social and Humanitarian Disciplines"
- SCC "Painting"

Faculty of Additional Professional Education

The Faculty of Additional Professional Education includes:

- Continuing Education Courses
- Choral Studio
- Training in additional general developmental programs in the arts for children and adults

== Students ==
As of January 2025, 630 students are studying at the Conservatory.

Notable graduates:

- Vladimir Migulya (composer)
- Irina Dubtsova (singer, songwriter)
