= Alla Kazanskaya =

Russian actress

Alla Alexandrovna Kazanskaya (Russian: Алла Александровна Казанская; 15 June 1920 – 25 June 2008) was a Russian stage and film actress. She began her career at the age of 18 at the Vakhtangov State Academic Theatre in Moscow. Her most notable film appearance was in the Academy Award-winning drama Burnt by the Sun (1994).

Composer Aram Khachaturian dedicated the Waltz from his incidental music to Lermontov's Masquerade to her. By the time of her death at age 88, she was the theatre's oldest working actress. She had received the Crystal Turandot, Russia's foremost theatre award, in 2007.

Kazanskaya was the fourth wife of director Boris Barnet, who committed suicide in 1965. Their daughter Olga Barnet (1951–2021) was also an actress.

== Awards ==
- People's Artist of the RSFSR (1971)
