= Karel van Ark =

Russian pianist and professor (1839–1902)

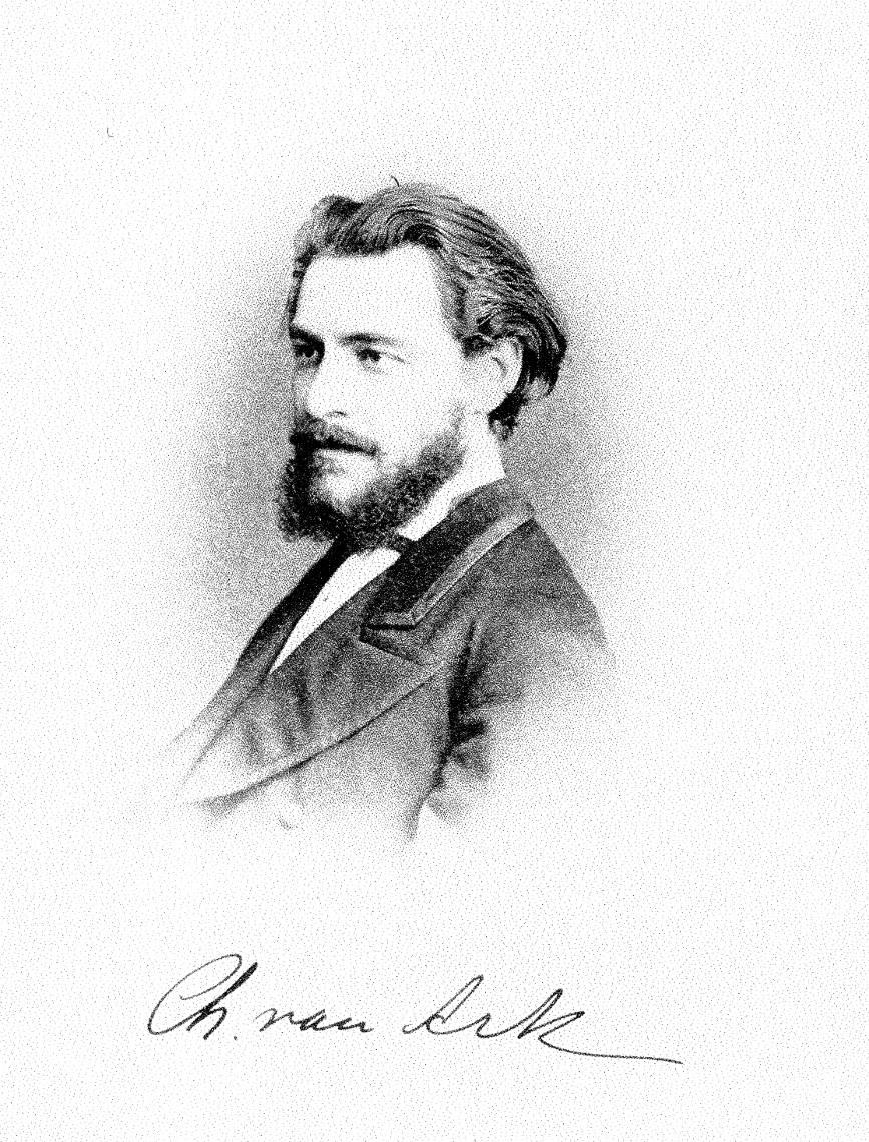
- Born: 9 September 1839; Saint Petersburg, Russia
- Died: 24 August 1902 (aged 62); Saint Petersburg, Russia
- Occupations: Pianist; music professor; composer
- Years active: 1862–1902

Karel (Charles) Pieter Hendrik van Ark (Note: Russian: Карл Карлович фан-Арк (also фан Арк; фон-Арк; Арк фан; ван Арк)) (9 September [O.S. 28 August] 1839 – 24 August [O.S. 11 August] 1902) was a Russian pianist, music teacher, and composer.

== Biography ==
Karel van Ark was of Dutch origin. He was born on 28 August 1839 (c. 1842 in other sources) in Saint Petersburg. His father was the organist of the Dutch Embassy Church in Saint Petersburg and a Dutch teacher. He received general education at the Peter and Paul Male Lutheran School.

A student of Theodor Leschetizky (piano) and Nikolai Zaremba (composition), van Ark became a teacher at the Saint Petersburg Conservatory from its founding in 1862, invited by Anton Rubinstein. He was initially an assistant to Leschetizky before becoming a professor in 1879. Van Ark was awarded the Order of Saint Stanislaus (third and second degree), Order of Saint Anna (third and second degree), and the Order of Saint Vladimir (fourth degree) during his forty years of teaching at the conservatory.

Aside from his position at the Saint Petersburg Conservatory, van Ark also gave lessons at the Saint Petersburg Russian Musical Society and the Smolny Institute of Noble Maidens.

He died on 24 August 1902 in Saint Petersburg and was buried at the Volkovskoye Cemetery on 27 August. Among his students were: Nikolai Abramychev, Anna Yesipova, Alexander Medem, Sophia von zur Mühlen, Paul de Conne, Nikolai Shishkin, Sergei Bortkiewicz, Pavel Weymarn, Viktor Kolomytsev, Nikolai Tcherepnin, and Lev Steinberg.

== Works ==
He compiled the Collection of Passages and Exercises Included in Elementary Instruction in the Piano Classes of the Saint Petersburg Conservatory (1873) and The Great School of Études (1886) for pianists. Van Ark authored the School of Piano Technique (1875), a piano manual in six sections on piano technique for beginner pianists. As a composer, he composed a number of salon pieces, including an Impromptu à la tarantelle and songs.
