= Jorge Mester =

Mexican conductor of Hungarian ancestry (born 1935)

Jorge Mester (born April 10, 1935, Mexico City) is a Mexican conductor of Hungarian ancestry. He has served as the artistic director for the Orquesta Filarmónica de Boca del Río, Veracruz, since it was founded in 2014.

== Biography ==
He studied conducting with Jean Morel at the Juilliard School in New York City, and worked with Leonard Bernstein at the Berkshire Music Center and with Albert Wolff. In 1955 he made his debut with the National Symphony Orchestra of Mexico and in 1960 made his opera debut with Salome at the Spoleto Festival in Italy.

Mester became music director of the Louisville Orchestra in 1967 and served in the post until 1979. In this time he gave over 200 world premieres of works commissioned by the orchestra.

From 1970 to 1990, he was music director of the Aspen Music Festival, and there founded the Aspen Chamber Symphony. He became music director of the Pasadena Symphony Orchestra in 1984. His most recent contract extension had been through 2012, but in May 2010, the orchestra announced the conclusion of Mester's tenure as music director with immediate effect.

In 1998, he became music director of the Mexico City Philharmonic Orchestra. From 2004 until 2012, Mester was the music director of the Naples Philharmonic in Naples, Florida. Mester returned to Louisville in 2006 for his second tenure as music director of the Louisville Orchestra, on an "open-ended" contract of unfixed duration, until the orchestra secured a new music director, with Mester as a member of the search committee.

Mester has served as director of Juilliard's conducting department and conducted concerts and operas in the USC Thornton School of Music. In 1987, Mester participated in the documentary A Woman Is a Risky Bet: Six Orchestra Conductors, directed by Christina Olofson, where he comments on the conservative attitudes towards women in the world of classical music.

Mester has a long-standing affiliation with Peter Schickele and the P.D.Q. Bach concerts, dating back to 1965, when he conducted the first public P.D.Q. Bach concert.

== Personal ==
Mester has been married twice. His first marriage to Paula Seibel ended in divorce. His second marriage, which also ended in divorce, was to the American mezzo-soprano Kimball Wheeler, with whom he had a daughter, Amanda, who is an accomplished hip-hop journalist and former college professor. He resides in Southern California.

Cultural offices
| Preceded by Robert Whitney | Music Director, Louisville Orchestra; 1967–1979 | Succeeded by Akira Endo |
| Preceded by Daniel Lewis | Music Director, Pasadena Symphony Orchestra; 1984–2010 | Succeeded by (post vacant) |
| Preceded by Christopher Seaman | Music Director, Naples Philharmonic Orchestra; 2004–present | Succeeded by incumbent |
| Preceded by Uri Segal | Music Director, Louisville Orchestra; 2006–present | Succeeded by incumbent |
