= Virginia Symphony Orchestra =

Symphony orchestra based in Norfolk, Virginia

The Virginia Symphony Orchestra (VSO) is an American orchestra administratively based in Norfolk. The VSO performs concerts in various venues in Virginia, including:

- Chrysler Hall, Norfolk
- The Sandler Center for the Performing Arts, Virginia Beach
- Ferguson Center for the Arts, Newport News
- Phi Beta Kappa Memorial Hall at the College of William & Mary in Williamsburg
- Regent University in Virginia Beach
- Attucks Theatre, Norfolk

The VSO also works closely with Virginia Opera and the Virginia Arts Festival.

== History ==
Walter Edward Howe, Marian Carpenter, and Robert C. Whitehead founded the orchestra in 1920 as the Norfolk Civic Symphony Orchestra. The orchestra gave its first concert on 21 April 1921, conducted by Howe, who was the first music director of the orchestra. At the time, the Norfolk Civic Symphony Orchestra was the only American orchestra between Baltimore and Atlanta.

In 1949, during the music directorship of Edgar Schenkman, the Norfolk Civic Symphony Orchestra merged with the Civic Chorus to form the Norfolk Symphony and Choral Association. During the subsequent music directorship of Russell Stanger, the orchestra hired its first African-American musician, and took up residency in Chrysler Hall, which had opened in 1972. During the 1970s, the orchestra began collaborating with the Virginia Opera. During the US economic crisis and recession of the 1970s, the Virginia Symphony assumed its present form in 1979 with the merger of the Norfolk Symphony, Peninsula Symphony Orchestra, and the Virginia Beach Pops Symphony.

In May 1991, JoAnn Falletta was appointed the orchestra's eleventh music director, the first female conductor to be named music director of the VSO. In April 2018, the VSO announced that Falletta would step down as its music director in June 2020. Falletta now holds the title of music director laureate.

In 2018, Eric Jacobsen first guest-conducted the VSO. In June 2021, the VSO announced the appointment of Jacobsen as its next music director, effective with the 2021–2022 season. In October 2023, the VSO announced an extension of Jacobsen's contract as music director through the 2026–2027 season.

Karen Philion most recently served as the VSO's president and chief executive officer from 2014 to 2022. In November 2022, the VSO announced the appointment of Andrea F. Warren as its new president and chief executive officer, the first African American woman named to the post, effective 1 December 2022.

== Music directors ==
- Walter Edward Howe
- W. Henry Baker
- Bart Wirtz
- Arthur Fickenscher
- Frank L. Delpino
- Henry Cowles Whitehead (1934–1948)
- Edgar Schenkman (1948–1966)
- Russell Stanger (1966–1980)
- Richard Williams (1980–1986)
- Winston Dan Vogel (1986–1990)
- JoAnn Falletta (1991–2020)
- Eric Jacobsen (2021–present)
