= Pavel Kogan (conductor) =

Russian violinist and conductor (born 1952)

Pavel Leonidovich Kogan
- Павел Леонидович Коган
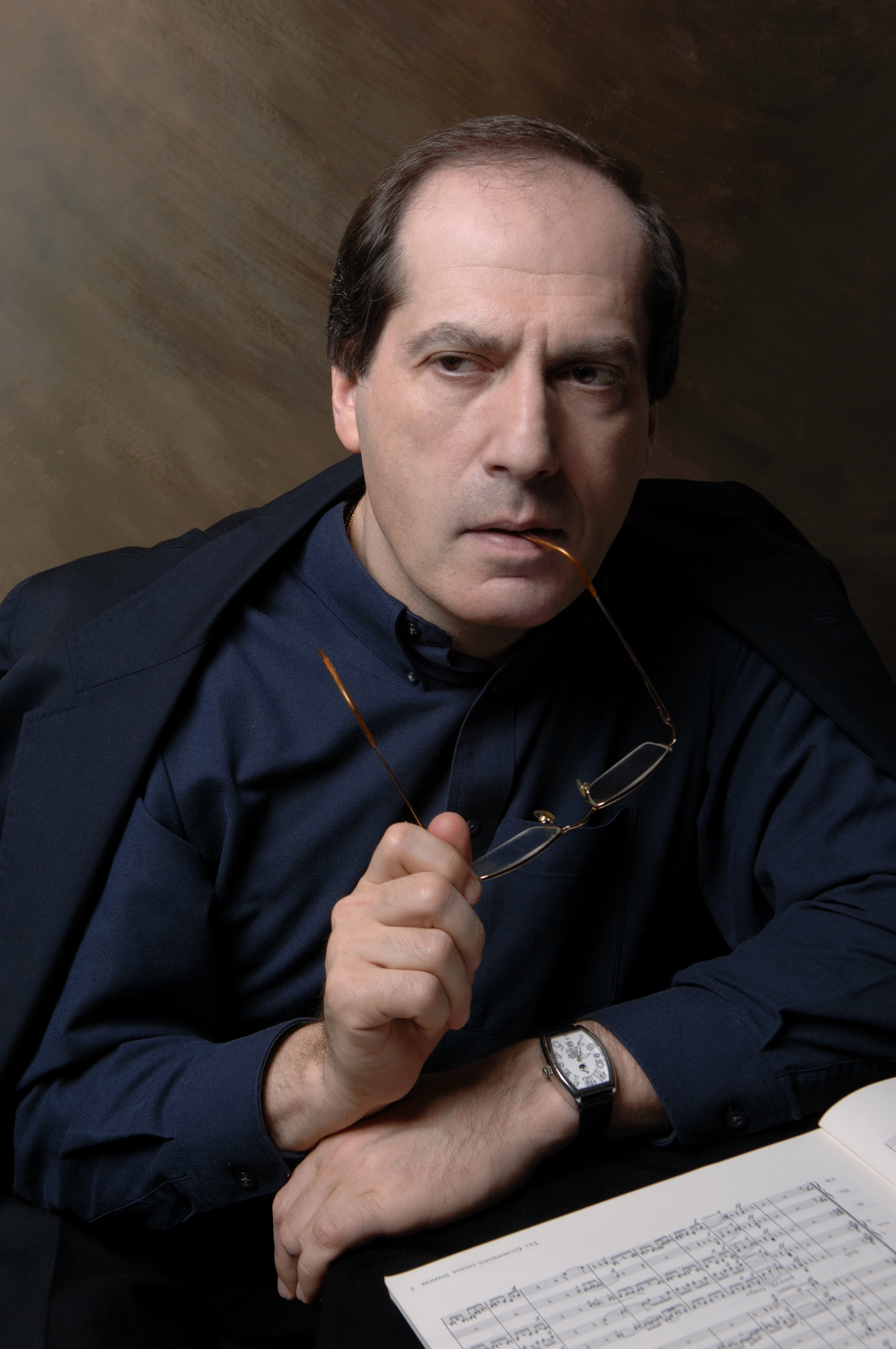
- Born: June 6, 1952 (age 73); Moscow, Russian SFSR, Soviet Union
- Education: Moscow Conservatory
- Occupations: Violinist, conductor

Pavel Leonidovich Kogan (Russian: Павел Леонидович Коган; born 6 June 1952 in Moscow) is a Russian violinist and conductor who was chief conductor of the Moscow State Symphony Orchestra from 1989 until 2022.

== Career ==
From an early age Kogan's artistic development was divided between conducting and violin. He was granted special permission to study both disciplines at the same time which was a rarity in the Soviet Union. In 1970, Kogan, a violin pupil of Yuri Yankelevich at the Moscow Conservatory, shared the 1st prize in the Sibelius Violin Competition in Helsinki with Liana Isakadze. Thereafter he appeared regularly as a violinist in concerts around the world.

As a conducting pupil of Ilya Musin and Leo Ginsburg, in 1972 the young Kogan gave his debut with the USSR State Symphony Orchestra and subsequently focused more on conducting. In the years that followed he conducted the leading Soviet orchestras both at home and on tour abroad at the invitation of Mravinsky, Kondrashin, Svetlanov and Rozhdestvensky. In 1988, as a conductor of the Bolshoi Opera, Kogan opened the season with a new production of Verdi's La Traviata. That same year he became the head of the Zagreb Philharmonic Orchestra.

From 1989 until 2022, Pavel Kogan was the music director and chief conductor of the Moscow State Symphony Orchestra (MSSO), building it into one of Russia's most widely known orchestras.

From 1998 to 2005, he served as principal guest conductor of the Utah Symphony Orchestra.

Kogan appeared with many prominent orchestras including the St. Petersburg Philharmonic Orchestra, Moscow Philharmonic Orchestra, USSR State Radio & TV Symphony Orchestra, Philadelphia Orchestra, Los Angeles Philharmonic, Bavarian Radio Symphony Orchestra, Munich Philharmonic, Orchestre National de Belgique, Helsinki Philharmonic Orchestra, RTVE Symphony Orchestra, Toronto Symphony Orchestra, Staatskapelle Dresden, Orquesta Filarmónica de Buenos Aires, L'Orchestre de la Suisse Romande, Orchestre National de France, Houston Symphony, Orchestre National du Capitole de Toulouse and the Luxembourg Philharmonic Orchestra.

Pavel Kogan has recorded several works with the MSSO and other ensembles. Gramophone called Kogan's Rachmaninoff cycle (Symphonies 1, 2, 3, Symphonic Dances, "Isle of the Dead," "Vocalise and Scherzo") "…sparkly, strongly communicative Rachmaninoff... vibrant, soulful and involving." Kogan was awarded the State Prize of the Russian Federation for his performance of the complete symphonies and vocal cycles of Gustav Mahler. He is a member of the Russian Academy of Arts and recipient of the "Order of Merit" of Russia and of the title "Peoples' Artist of Russia" among other Russian and overseas awards.

== Personal life ==
Kogan's wife is Aistė Kogan. His son was violinist Dmitri Kogan.

Kogan was born into a distinguished musical family – his parents are violinists Leonid Kogan and Elizaveta Gilels and his uncle is the pianist Emil Gilels.

Within days after the Russo-Ukrainian war began, Kogan resigned from his role with the Moscow Symphony Orchestra and left Russia. He was succeeded by Ivan Nikiforchin.

== Recordings ==
As violinist:

- Haydn Concerto No. 1 for Violin and Orchestra. Mozart: Concerto No. 5 for Violin and Orchestra in A Major KV219. Melodiya, LP.
- Rachmaninov: Symphony No. 3; Symphonic Dances. Moscow State Symphony Orchestra. Alto. CD.
