= Winston Dan Vogel =

Israeli-born American conductor (born 1943)

Winston Dan Vogel (born 1943) is an Israeli-born American conductor. He was the musical director of the Virginia Symphony Orchestra from 1986 to 1990 and is the founder, President, and Artistic Director of Opera USA.
