= Pavel Serebryakov =

- Born: Pavel Alekseyevich Serebryakov; 28 February 1909; Tsaritsyn, Saratov Governorate, Russian Empire
- Died: 17 August 1977 (aged 68) Leningrad, RSFSR, Soviet Union
- Occupations: Pianist, music pedagogue
- Instrument: Piano
- Years active: 1930–1977

Pavel Alekseyevich Serebryakov (Russian: Павел Алексеевич Серебряков; 28 February 1909 – 17 August 1977) was a Soviet classical pianist and pedagogue.

Serebryakov began touring the USSR after ranking 2nd at the I National Competition (1933). A professor at the Leningrad Conservatory, he was the institution's rector from 1938–51 and from 1961 until his death. The Volgograd Conservatory has been named in honor of him since 1989.

== Awards and honors ==
- Order of the Badge of Honour (1938)
- Honored Art Worker of the Uzbek SSR (1944)
- People's Artist of the RSFSR (1957)
- Order of Lenin (1961)
- People's Artist of the USSR (1962)
- Two Orders of the Red Banner of Labour
