= Eric Jacobsen (conductor) =

American musician and conductor

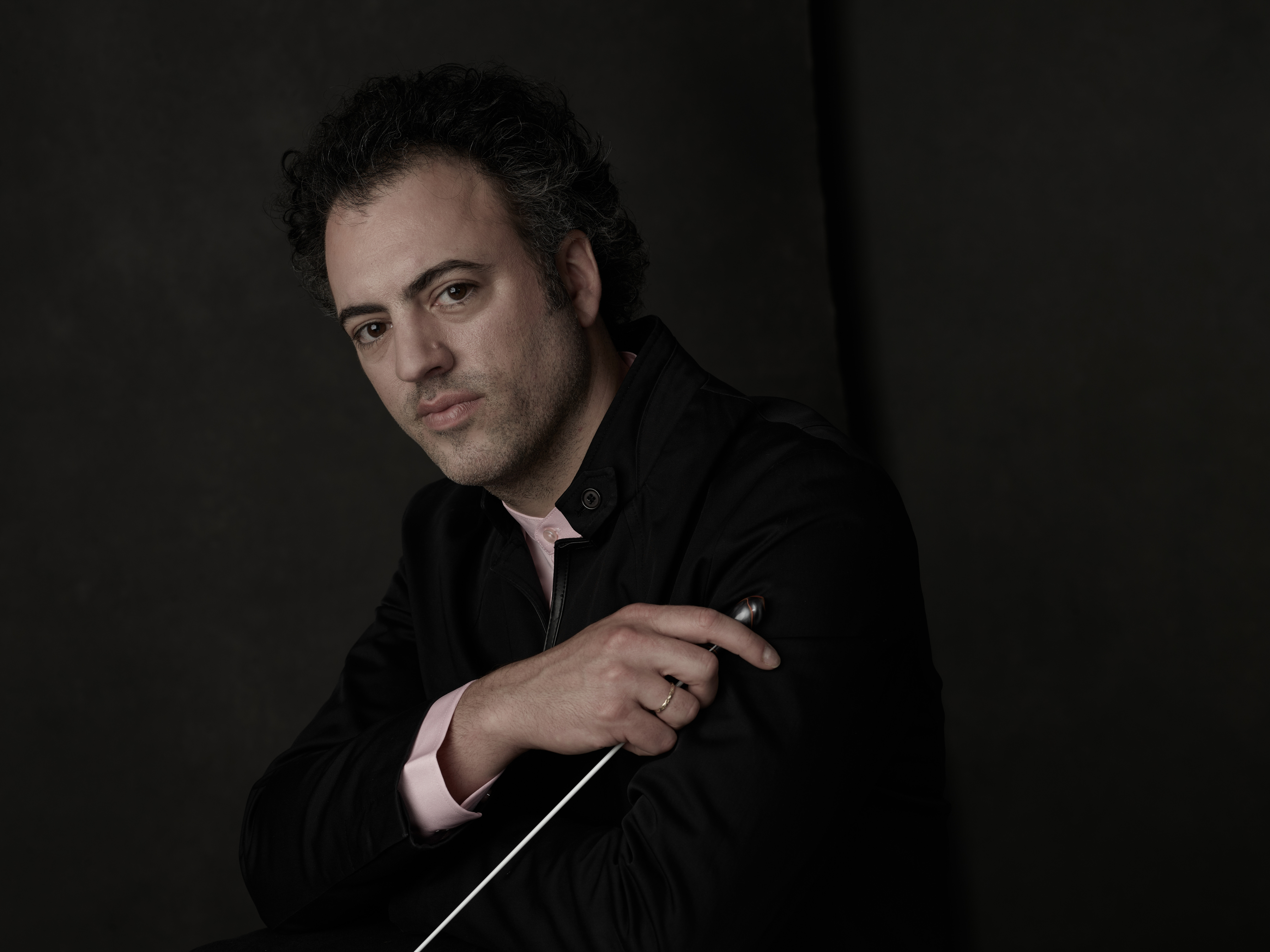
Eric Jacobsen in 2024

Eric Jacobsen (born July 16, 1982) is an American conductor and cellist. He is currently a member of The Knights, and the Silk Road Project, and is the music director of the Orlando Philharmonic Orchestra and Virginia Symphony Orchestra, Principal Conductor of the Greater Bridgeport Symphony, and when was an artistic partner of the Northwest Sinfonietta from 2015 to 2018

== Personal history ==
Born on Long Island, New York, Jacobsen is the son of Edmund Jacobsen, a violinist and former member of the Metropolitan Opera Orchestra, and Ivy Jacobsen, a noted flutist. His brother is violinist Colin Jacobsen, with whom he co-founded Brooklyn Rider and The Knights. The Jacobsen brothers were largely exposed to music through their parents, whose late night chamber music soirees in part influenced the brothers to study music and inspired them to believe in, and later promote, classical music as a party. Jacobsen graduated from the Juilliard School. In 2016, he married folk singer Aoife O'Donovan; their daughter Ivy Jo was born in 2017.

== Conducting ==
He often takes up the baton for The Knights, with whom he has recorded a collection of albums and toured in North America and Europe. The Knights are an orchestral collective, flexible in size and repertory, whose stated mission is to transform the concert experience. With a collaborative rehearsal process and the desire to promote musical discovery, The Knights have been called "one of Brooklyn's sterling cultural products...known far beyond the borough for their relaxed virtuosity and expansive repertory" by The New Yorker. The ensemble has worked with well-known names in music, like Yo-Yo Ma, Dawn Upshaw, Itzhak Perlman, Jan Vogler, Gil Shaham, Bela Fleck and Joshua Redman. Members include performers, composers, arrangers, improvisors, and singer-songwriters, and the group has many cultural influences across musical genres.

Jacobsen has conducted The Knights for concerts at Carnegie Hall, Lincoln Center, the 92nd Street Y, for the Naumburg Orchestral Concerts [since 2010] in Central Park's Naumburg Bandshell, (Le) Poisson Rouge, the Dresden Musikfestpiele, Cologne Philharmonie, and the National Gallery of Dublin. Jacobsen and The Knights have returned regularly to perform at the Ravinia Festival in Chicago. Other festival appearances include Caramoor, Tanglewood, and the Dresden Musikfestspiele. Jacobsen led several concerts at the 2014 Ojai Music Festival, where The Knights were in residence, with pianist Jeremy Denk and singer Storm Large.

Jacobsen led the Camerata Bern in the European premiere of Mark O'Connor's American Seasons, the Detroit Symphony Orchestra with pipa virtuoso Wu Man, the Alabama Symphony, the Orlando Philharmonic, and the Baltimore Symphony, and has conducted the Silk Road Ensemble with Yo-Yo Ma.

The 2014–15 season marked Jacobsen's first as music director of the Greater Bridgeport Symphony and Artistic Partner of the Northwest Sinfonietta.

Jacobsen was appointed the music director of the Orlando Philharmonic Orchestra in 2015, engaging in a five-year appointment with the symphony orchestra.

Jacobsen was appointed the music director of the Virginia Symphony Orchestra in 2021, making him the 12th music director in the VSO's 101-year history.

== Cello performance ==
Jacobsen plays as a cellist in a number of ensembles.

Jacobsen and brother Colin founded string quartet Brooklyn Rider in 2004 along with violinist Johnny Gandelsman and violist Nicholas Cords. The quartet has been called “one of the wonders of contemporary music” by the Los Angeles Times and the Pittsburgh Post-Gazette described the group as playing "with the energy of young rock stars jamming on their guitars, a Beethoven-goes-indie foray into making classical music accessible but also celebrating why it was good in the first place". The quartet has recorded extensively and has appeared at Carnegie Hall, Lincoln Center, South by Southwest, and the San Francisco Jazz Festival, among many other prestigious venues and festivals.

A long-time member of Yo-Yo Ma's Silk Road Ensemble, Jacobsen performs as both cellist and conductor with the group. He has traveled around Asia, Europe, and North America with the ensemble, promoting cultural partnerships and educational opportunities with musicians from around the world.

Jacobsen's primary teachers included Harvey Shapiro and Joseph Elworthy.

Discography

- The Knights: The Knights before Christmas (2021, Bright Shiny Things)
- Greater Bridgeport Symphony, Kayhan Kalhor, Sandeep Das, Karen Ouzounian, New York Gypsy All Stars: Blue as the Turquoise Night (2021, Bright Shiny Things)
- The Knights, Gil Shaham: Beethoven & Brahms: Violin Concertos (2021, Canary Classics)
- The Knights, Yo-Yo Ma: Azul (2017, Warner Classics)
- The Knights, Gil Shaham, Stephane Deneve: 1930s Violin Concertos, Vol. 2 (2016, Canary Classics)
- The Knights: the ground beneath our feet (2015, Warner Classics)
- Brooklyn Rider: The Brooklyn Rider Almanac (2014, Mercury Classics)
- The Knights: Beethoven (2013, Sony Classical)
- Brooklyn Rider and Béla Fleck: The Impostor (2013, Decca)
- Brooklyn Rider: A Walking Fire (2013, Mercury Classics)
- The Knights: A Second of Silence (2012, Ancalagon Records)
- Brooklyn Rider: Seven Steps (2012, In A Circle Records)
- The Knights: New Worlds (2010, Sony Classics)
- Lisa Bielawa and The Knights: Chance Encounter (2010)
- The Knights with Scott and Lara St. John: Mozart (2010, Ancalagon Records)
- Brooklyn Rider: Dominant Curve (2010, In A Circle Records)
- Brooklyn Rider: Passport (2010, In A Circle Records)
- Silk Road Ensemble: Off the Map (2009, World Village)
- The Knights and Jan Vogler: Experience – Live From New York (2009, Sony)
- Brooklyn Rider and Kayhan Kalhor: Silent City (2008, World Village)
- Silk Road Ensemble: New Impossibilities (2007, Sony Classics)

Videography

- Silk Road Ensemble with Yo-Yo Ma: Tanglewood (2014, PBS)
- We Are The Knights (2011, PBS)
- The Knights: Beethoven – Pastorale (2009, In A Circle)
