= Leonid Kogan =

Soviet violinist (1924–1982)

- Born: Leonid Borisovich Kogan; 14 November 1924; Yekaterinoslav, Ukrainian SSR, Soviet Union
- Died: 17 December 1982 (aged 58); Mytishchi, Moscow Oblast, Russian SFSR, Soviet Union
- Occupation: Violinist

Leonid Borisovich Kogan (Russian: Леонид Борисович Коган; Ukrainian: Леонід Борисович Коган; 14 November 1924 – 17 December 1982) was a preeminent Soviet violinist during the 20th century. Many consider him to be among the greatest violinists of the 20th century. In particular, he is considered to have been one of the greatest representatives of the Soviet School of violin playing.

== Life and career ==
Kogan was born to a Jewish family in Yekaterinoslav (now Dnipro), the son of a photographer. After he showed an early interest and ability for violin playing, his family moved to Moscow, where he was able to further his studies. From age ten he studied there with the noted violin pedagogue Abram Yampolsky. In 1934, Jascha Heifetz played concerts in Moscow. "I attended every one," Kogan later said, "and can remember until now every note he played. He was the ideal artist for me." When Kogan was 12, Jacques Thibaud was in Moscow and heard him play. The French virtuoso predicted a great future for Kogan.

Kogan studied at the Central Music School in Moscow (1934–43), then at the Moscow Conservatory (1943–48), where he studied as a postgraduate (1948–51).

At the age of 17, and while still a student, he performed throughout the Soviet Union. He was co-winner of the first prize at the World Youth Festival in Prague. In 1951, Kogan won first prize at the Queen Elisabeth Competition in Brussels with a dazzling performance of Paganini's first concerto that included an outstanding interpretation of Sauret's cadenza.

His official debut was in 1941, playing the Brahms Concerto with the Moscow Philharmonic Orchestra in the Great Hall of the Moscow Conservatory.

His international solo tours took him to Paris and London in 1955, and then South America and the United States in the following years. Kogan had a repertoire of over 18 concerti and a number of concerti by modern composers were dedicated to him.

In 1952, Kogan began teaching at the Moscow Conservatory, and in 1980 he was invited to teach at the Accademia Musicale Chigiana in Siena, Italy.

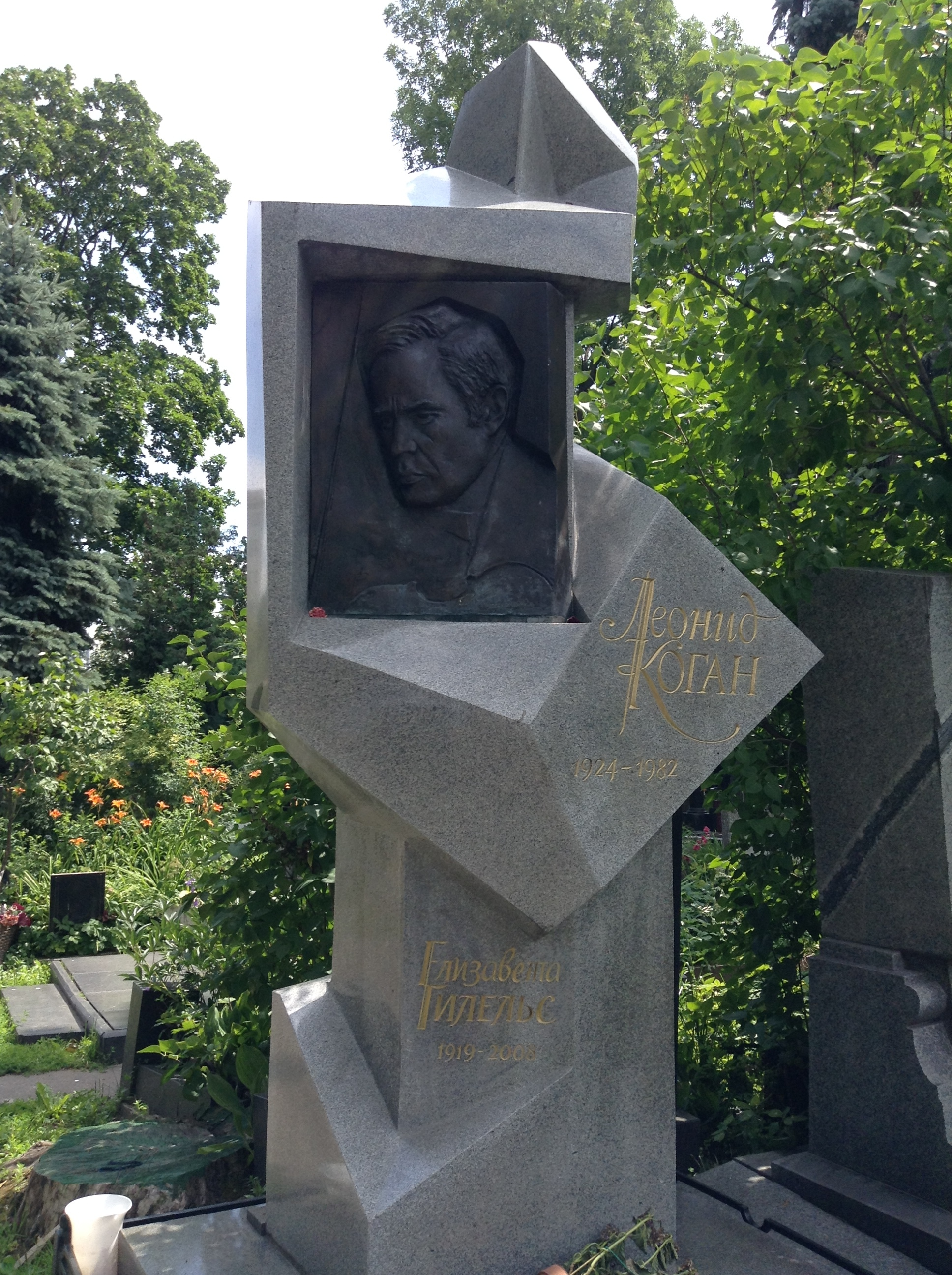
The tomb of Leonid Kogan

Kogan, a brilliant and compelling violinist who excelled in both the concerto repertoire and in chamber music, shunned publicity. His career was always overshadowed by that of David Oistrakh, who was strongly promoted by the Soviet authorities. Like Oistrakh, Kogan made a few studio recordings in the West, mostly for EMI. The bulk of his recordings were made in the Soviet Union, however, and their availability outside that country was very rare until the release of the Brilliant box set "Historic Russian Archives Leonid Kogan Edition"

Kogan was made a People's Artist of the USSR in 1964, and received the Lenin Prize in 1965.

Kogan married Elizabeth Gilels (sister of pianist Emil Gilels), also a concert violinist. His son, Pavel Kogan (b. 1952) became a famous violinist and conductor. His daughter, Nina Kogan (b. 1954), is a concert pianist and became the accompanist and sonata partner of her father at an early age.

Kogan died of a heart attack in the city of Mytishchi, while travelling by train between Moscow and Yaroslavl to a concert he was to perform with his son. Two days before, he had played the Beethoven Violin Concerto in Vienna. He was buried in Novodevichy Cemetery.

Many speculate that Kogan played on all steel strings, though there is not an outright confirmation. While his close associates indicate he played on gut strings except for a steel 'e' string, it is most likely that he used different combinations over the course of his career.

== Instruments ==
Kogan used two Guarneri del Gesù violins: the 1726 ex-Colin and the 1733 ex-Burmester. He used French bows by Dominique Peccatte. Kogan never actually owned these instruments; they were provided on loan from the Soviet government. Today, they are worth more than US$4 million.

== Recordings ==
Kogan formed a trio with pianist Emil Gilels and cellist Mstislav Rostropovich. Their recordings include Beethoven's Archduke Trio, the Schumann D minor, the Tchaikovsky, the Saint-Saëns, the Horn Trio by Brahms with Yakov Shapiro (horn), and the Fauré C minor Quartet with Rudolf Barshai (viola). Kogan later formed another trio with conductor Yevgeny Svetlanov (piano) and Fyodor Luzanov (cello). Kogan was the first Soviet violinist to play and record Berg's Violin Concerto. He also made a famous recording of Khachaturian's Violin Concerto with Pierre Monteux and the Boston Symphony Orchestra for RCA Victor (his American debut recording), a version still considered the most exciting reading of the work. Kogan recorded violin concerti by other Soviet composers, including the two by Tikhon Khrennikov. With Karl Richter, Kogan recorded J. S. Bach's six Violin Sonatas in 1972.

There are more than 30 albums of his performances on the Arlecchino label. In 2006, EMI France issued a 4-CD box set ("Les Introuvables de Leonid Kogan") containing his concerto recordings for that label, all digitally remastered the same year.

The EMI Kogan recordings from 1950s and 1960s used to belong to Columbia, who released about five stereo recordings of Kogan in the vinyl record period: Beethoven Violin Concerto (SAX 2386), Brahms Violin Concerto (SAX 2307), Tchaikovsky Violin Concerto (SAX 2323), Lalo Symphonie espagnole (SAX 2329) and Leclair/Telemann/Ysaye Sonatas for duo Violins (SAX 2531). Nowadays, these Kogan records are among the most sought-after records for classical vinyl collectors. For example, the price of the Beethoven Violin Concerto (SAX2386) record soars up to 10,000 dollars in eBay auctions.

== See also ==
- Pavel Kogan
- Dmitri Kogan
