= Victoria Bond =

American conductor and composer

Victoria Ellen Bond (born 6 May 1945) is an American conductor and composer in New York City.

== Early life ==
Victoria Bond was born in Los Angeles, California, the daughter of operatic bass and medical doctor Philip Bond (a vocalist with the New York City Opera) and concert pianist Jane Courtland, who studied with Bela Bartok. Her grandfather was Samuel Epstein, a composer, conductor and double bass player. Bond married Stephan Peskin in 1974.

== Education ==
Bond attended University of California, Los Angeles and University of Southern California, studying voice with William Vennard and composition with Ingolf Dahl.

She received her doctorate at the Juilliard School of Music, where she studied composition with Roger Sessions and conducting with Jean Morel and Sixten Ehrling. She took masterclasses with Herbert von Karajan. She also studied with Herbert Blomstedt at Aspen Music Festival and School. While a student at Juilliard, Bond served as assistant to Pierre Boulez, Mstislav Rostropovitch and Aaron Copland. She was the first woman to be awarded a doctoral degree in Orchestral Conducting from Juilliard in 1977.

== Awards ==
She is the recipient of the Victor Herbert Award, the American Academy of Arts and Letters’ Walter Hinrichsen Award, the Perry F. Kendig Award and the Miriam Gideon Prize. She has been awarded honorary doctorates from Hollins and Roanoke Colleges, and Washington and Lee University.

== Conductor ==
Bond was music director and conductor of Roanoke Symphony Orchestra from 1986 to 1995 and artistic director of Opera Roanoke from 1989 to 1995. In addition, she held the following conducting and artistic positions:

- Pittsburgh Symphony: Exxon/Arts Endowment Conductor (1978-1980)
- Pittsburgh Youth Symphony: music director and conductor (1978-1980)
- New Amsterdam Symphony: artistic director (1978-1980)
- Albany Symphony: guest conductor (1980-1985)
- Empire State Youth Orchestra: music director (1980-1985)
- Bel Canto Opera Company (New York): artistic director
- New York City Opera: assistant conductor (1985)
- Southwest Virginia Opera: artistic director
- Harrisburg Opera: artistic director
- Ray Charles orchestral concerts (national and international tours): conductor (1986-2003)
- Wuhan Symphony: music advisor (1994)
- Southwest Virginia Opera: music director (1997)
- Harrisburg Opera: music director (1997-2002)
- Chamber Opera Chicago: principal guest conductor (2005)

She was the first American woman to conduct and record in China with the Shanghai Symphony (1994), the Central Opera (2004) and to be appointed Music Advisor to the Wuhan Symphony (1994).

== Composer and performer ==
Bond began her professional performing career as a soprano, and was the featured soloist in the premiere performance and recording on Columbia Masterworks of Harry Partch's opera Delusion of the Fury.

She has composed operas including Mrs. President about Victoria Woodhull, which premiered in 2012 in Anchorage, Alaska, and Clara about the life of Clara Schumann, which premiered in 2019 at the Berlin Philharmonic Easter Festival.

Other operas include The Adventures of Gulliver commissioned by American Opera Project through Opera America’s grant to Female Composers (2016); The Miracle of Light commissioned by The Young Peoples Chorus of New York City and premiered by Chamber Opera Chicago (2017), Sirens, commissioned by the Roger Shapiro Fund and premiered by Cygnus (2017); Travels premiered by Opera Roanoke (1995).

She assisted film composer Paul Glass and Hugo Friedhofer in orchestrating and ghost-writing film scores for Universal Pictures and Metromedia Studios.

Ms. Bond is Artistic Director of Cutting Edge Concerts New Music Festival in New York, which she founded in 1998, and is a frequent lecturer at the Metropolitan Opera Guild and has lectured for the New York Philharmonic.

== Works ==
Selected works include:

- Blue and Green Music string quartet, 2019
- Binary 4-hand version, 2019
- Simeron Kremate piano, 2017
- Sirens opera, chorus, chamber ensemble, actors, 2017
- The Adventures of Gulliver opera, 2016
- Clara opera, 2015
- Soul of a Nation Concerto for Violin and String Ensemble, 2015
- The Reluctant Moses Oratorio; bass-baritone, double bass, orchestra, chorus SATB, 2015
- The Crowded Hours Concerto for Trumpet and Wind Ensemble, 2015
- Bridges Five-Movement Orchestral version, 2014
- How Lovely is Your Dwelling Place Chorus, organ, 2014
- The Indispensable Man Concerto for Clarinet and Wind Ensemble, 2012
- The Miracle of Light Hanukkah opera, 2011
- Pater Patriae Concerto for Flute and Wind Ensemble, 2011
- Leopold Bloom's Homecoming tenor, piano, 2011
- Br’er Rabbit and the Wolves’ Party narrator, violin, cello, banjo, 2011
- There Isn’t Time Harry Partch Instruments, 2010
- Instruments of Revelation flute, clarinet, violin, cello, piano. 2011
- Frescoes and Ash Chamber Ensemble, 2009
- Coqui string quintet + woodwind quintet, 2009
- Binary one piano version, 2008
- Seduction and Sanctification, Triple Concerto for flute, viola, harp and orchestra, 2007
- Bridges chamber version, 2006
- Sacred Sisters for violin and harp, 2005
- Woven for violin and viola, or 2 flutes, or 2 violins, 2005
- My Grandfather’s Balalaika string quartet, 2003
- A More Perfect Union, 2002
- Ancient Keys concerto for piano and orchestra, 2002
- Mrs. President, chamber opera, 2001
- Jasmine Flower (茉莉花; Moli Hua) for viola solo, 1999
- A Modest Proposal for tenor and orchestra, 1999
- Potirion Sotiriu for piano, 1999
- Insects for solo electric viola, 1996
- Travels, 1994
- Thinking like a Mountain for Narrator and orchestra, 1994
- Dreams of Flying for string quartet, 1994
- Urban Bird, concerto for alto saxophone an orchestra, 1993
- Hot Air, woodwind quintet, 1991
- Molly ManyBloom soprano and string quartet, 1990
- Black Light for piano and orchestra, 1988
- What’s the Point of Counterpoint? for narrator and orchestra, 1985
- The Frog Prince for piano and orchestra, 1984
- Great Galloping Gottschalk for American Ballet Theatre, 1981
- Journal for chamber orchestra, 1981
- Trio: Other Selves for Jacob’s Pillow Dance Festival, 1979
- Equinox orchestra, 1977
- Conversation Piece for viola and vibraphone, 1975
- Duet for flute and viola, 1969
- Mirror, Mirror for soprano, flute and viola, 1969
