= Moscow State Symphony Orchestra =

The Moscow State Symphony Orchestra (MSSO) is a Russian orchestra based in Moscow. The orchestra gives concerts primarily at the Great Hall of the Moscow Conservatory, and at the Tchaikovsky Concert Hall, and occasionally in the Great Hall of the Saint Petersburg D.D. Shostakovich Philharmonic Society, as well as in other Russian cities.

The orchestra was founded in 1943 under the auspices of the government of the then-USSR. Lev Steinberg was the orchestra's first chief conductor until his death in 1945. Successive chief conductors have included Nikolai Anosov (1945–1950), Leo Ginzburg (1950–1954), Mikhail Terian (1954–1960), Veronica Dudarova (1960–1989) and Pavel Kogan (1989–2022).

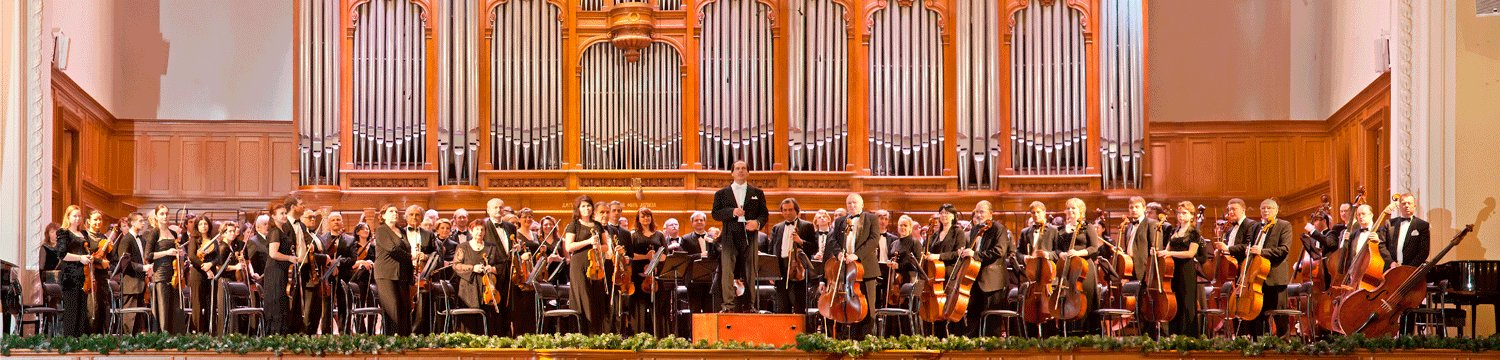
Moscow State Symphony Orchestra (MSSO) with Pavel Kogan, Music Director and Chief Conductor

== Chief conductors ==
- Lev Steinberg (1943–1945)
- Nikolai Anosov (1945–1950)
- Leo Ginzburg (1950–1954)
- Mikhail Terian (1954–1960)
- Veronica Dudarova (1960–1989)
- Pavel Kogan (1989–2022)
- Ivan Nikiforchin (since 2024)
