= Camilla Kolchinsky =

- Камилла Кольчинская
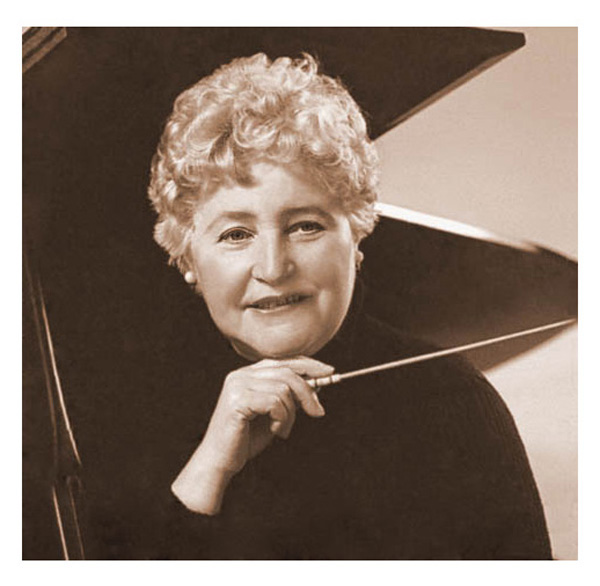
- Born: 25 December 1931; Moscow, Russia
- Died: 16 February 2016 (aged 84); Mountain View, California
- Occupation: conductor (music)
- Website: Official website

Camilla Alexandrovna Kolchinsky (Russian: Камилла Александровна Кольчинская; 25 December 1931 – 16 February 2016) was a Jewish conductor who was born in Russia. She was born in Moscow and made her debut as a conductor in Leningrad, now is known as St. Petersburg, while still a student. In 1976 she emigrated to Israel. She had conducted performances of the Polish National Radio Symphony Orchestra and the Israel Philharmonic Orchestra and according to Gramophone was "one of the few Russian women to have made a successful international career as a conductor." At the time of her death she was the emeritus director of the El Camino Youth Orchestra.

== Recordings ==
- Glazunov/Dvorák Violin Concertos – Ilya Kaler (violin), Polish National Radio Symphony Orchestra, Camilla Kolchinsky (conductor). Label: Naxos
