= Lev Steinberg =

Russian conductor and composer

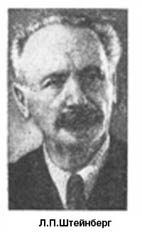
Lev Steinberg

Lev Petrovich Steinberg (Russian: Лев Петрович Штейнберг; 15 September [O.S. 3 September] 1870 – 16 January 1945) was an influential Russian conductor and composer.

== Life ==
Steinberg was born on 15 September 1870 in Yekaterinoslav (now Dnipro, Ukraine). He studied piano with Anton Rubinstein and Karel van Ark, composition theory with Nikolai Solovyov (previously with Nikolai Rimsky-Korsakov), and theory with Anatoly Lyadov. In 1893 he graduated from the Saint Petersburg Conservatory. Steinberg made his debut as a conductor in 1892, during the summer symphony concerts in Druskininkai.

In 1899, he conducted operas at the Kononov Hall and the Mariinsky Theater, Saint Petersburg. He worked as a symphonic and opera conductor in theaters in Moscow (1902), Saratov (1903), Kharkov (1910–1913), Kiev (1911–1914) and other cities. Steinberg performed in Sergei Diaghilev's Ballet russes (Paris and London), invited by Diaghilev in 1914. Later the conductor performed in Bern, Dresden, Leipzig, and Berlin.

After the revolution, he worked in the theaters of Kiev (now the National Opera of Ukraine) in 1917–1924, at the Ukrainian State Capital Opera (now the Kharkiv State Academic Opera and Ballet Theater named after Mykola Lysenko) in 1924–1926, at the Sverdlovsk State Opera House named after Anatoly Lunacharsky (now the Yekaterinburg Opera and Ballet Theater) in 1926–1928, and in Baku. The conductor participated in the organization of theaters and philharmonic societies in Kiev and Odessa.

From 1928 Steinberg lived in Moscow. He was conductor of the Bolshoi Theater (1928–1941; 1943–1945) and artistic director of the symphony orchestra of the Central House of the Red Army. Among the recordings he made was the first full version of Rimsky-Korsakov's The Tsar's Bride. He was a professor and taught conducting at the Moscow Conservatory (1937–1938). Steinberg took charge of the newly-founded Moscow State Symphony Orchestra in 1943 and directed it until his death.

He died on 16 January 1945 in Moscow and was buried at the Novodevichy Cemetery.

== Compositions ==
- Opera Nine days which shook the world («Девять дней, которые потрясли мир»)

== Recordings ==
- Rimsky-Korsakov: The Tsar's Bride 1943.
