= Christina Olofson =

Swedish film director, screenwriter and film producer

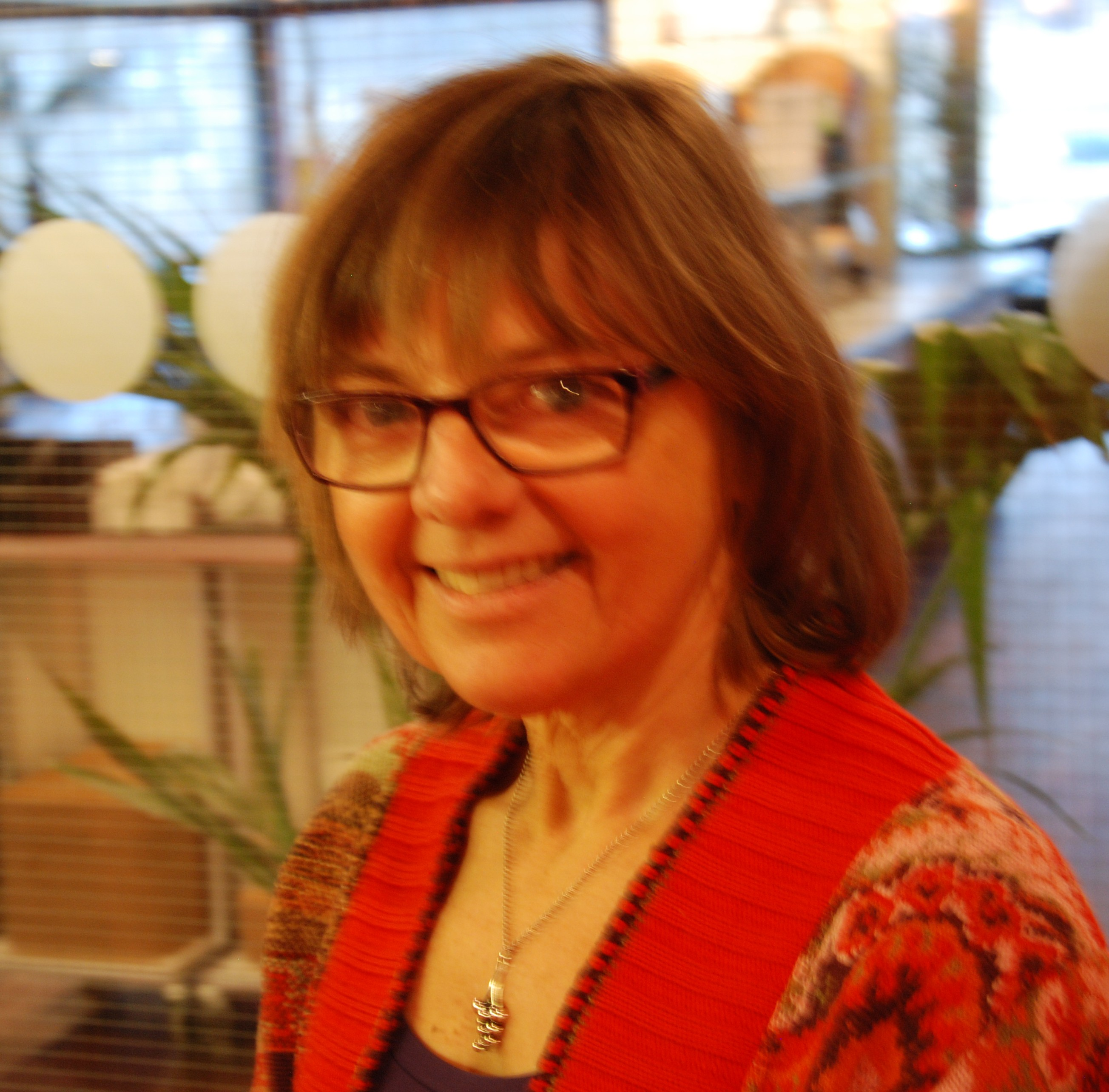
- Christina Olofson
- Born: Kristinehamn, Sweden
- Occupation: film director

Christina Olofson is a Swedish film director, producer and scriptwriter. In 1974, after founding the Hagafilm production company with Göran du Rées, she went on to produce a number of films with him. She has since made a number of documentaries on women's contributions to society, including A Woman Is a Risky Bet: Six Orchestra Conductors (1987) and I rollerna tre (1996), as well as the feature films Honungsvargar (1990) and Sanning eller konsekvens (1997).

== Biography ==
Born in Kristinehamn in the south of Sweden, Olofson studied at the universities of Gothenburg and Stockholm. In 1970, she took a course in film editing at SVT, the Swedish national television broadcaster, while attending courses on film and theatre at Stockholm's Dramatiska Institutet.

After working as an editor at SVT's TV2, she left in 1977 to concentrate on filmmaking. In 1978, together with du Rées, she produced the full-length documentary Tältprojektet – vem tillhör världen, one of the most significant records of Sweden's progressive music and drama scene in the 1970s. Her short Bara ett barn (Just a Child, 1980) depicts a young, unemployed woman, evoking her frequently repeated theme of women's work and their desire for creative fulfilment.

Her collaboration with the photographer Lisa Hagstrand began in 1985 with Möted med Flory describing the novelist Elin Wägner's encounter with the 82-year-old nature lover, Flory Gate. The Finnish artist Helene Schjerfbeck was the subject of the short documentary Nästa söndag ska jag måla en svart prick bättre (1987).

Olofson was a board member of the film department of the Swedish Theatre Association (Teaterförbundet) from 1980 to 1983 and a member of the Swedish Film Institute's feature film board from 1984 to 1987.
