= Hellmesberger =

Hellmesberger is a surname.

Notable bearers include an Austrian family of musicians, which includes:

- Georg Hellmesberger, Sr., (1800–1873) father of Joseph Sr. and Georg Jr.
- Joseph Hellmesberger, Sr., (1828–1893), son of Georg Sr., father of Joseph Jr. and Ferdinand
- Georg Hellmesberger, Jr., ( 1830–1852), son of Georg Sr.
- Joseph Hellmesberger, Jr. (1855–1907), son of Joseph Sr.
- Ferdinand Hellmesberger (1863–1940), son of Joseph Sr.
- Hellmesberger Quartet, a string quartet formed in Vienna in 1849
