= Matthias Durst =

Austrian violinist, violist and composer

Matthias Durst (18 August 1815 – 2 May 1875) was an Austrian violinist, violist and composer.

== Biography ==
Born in Vienna, he studied at the Vienna Conservatory with Georg Hellmesberger, Sr. and Joseph Böhm. He was a member of the Vienna Burgtheater. From 1841 he was appointed at the Vienna Court Orchestra. He was professor at the Kirchenmusikverein at St. Anna.

From 1845 he played in the string quartet, with Leopold Jansa, Carl Heißler and Carl Schlesinger, which in 1849 became the Hellmesberger Quartet, with Joseph Hellmesberger, Sr. taking over from Jansa.

== Works ==
Durst composed overtures, string quartets, violin duos, and solos.
