= Anton Walter (cellist) =

Austrian cellist

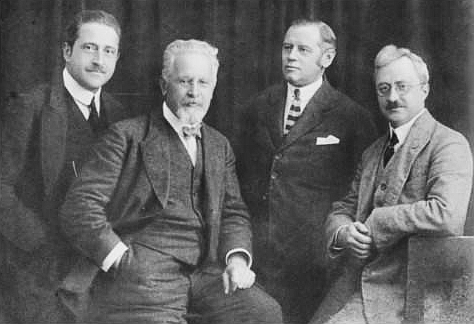
Anton Walter (right), Member of the Viennese Rosé Quartet, ca. 1921

Anton Walter (3 April 1883 – 25 September 1950) was an Austrian cellist.

== Life ==
Born in Karlsbad, from 1896 until 1901 he studied violoncello with Ferdinand Hellmesberger at the conservatory of the Gesellschaft der Musikfreunde in Vienna.

After his studies, he was a member of the Fitzner Quartet from 1901 to 1919. In 1918, he became principal cellist of the Wiener Tonkünstler-Orchester. From 1921 until 1930, he played in the Rosé Quartet. From 1934 to 1937, he was a member of the Stross Quartet in Munich.

He also worked as a private teacher, so he taught, among others Emanuel Feuermann. From 1918 until 1921, he represented Paul Grümmer and Friedrich Buxbaum as a substitute teacher at the Wiener Musikakademie. From 1928 until 1930, he took over a master class at the Prayner Conservatory of Music and Dramatic Arts in Vienna. In 1930, he was appointed professor at the Hochschule für Musik und Theater München.

He was married to a daughter of the Viennese architect Hugo von Wiedenfeld.

Walter died in Munich at the age of 67.

== Awards ==
- 1901: Silver Society Medal of the Gesellschaft der Musikfreunde in Vienna.
- 1925: Professional title Professor
