= Das klagende Lied =

Cantata by Gustav Mahler

- Cantata by Gustav Mahler
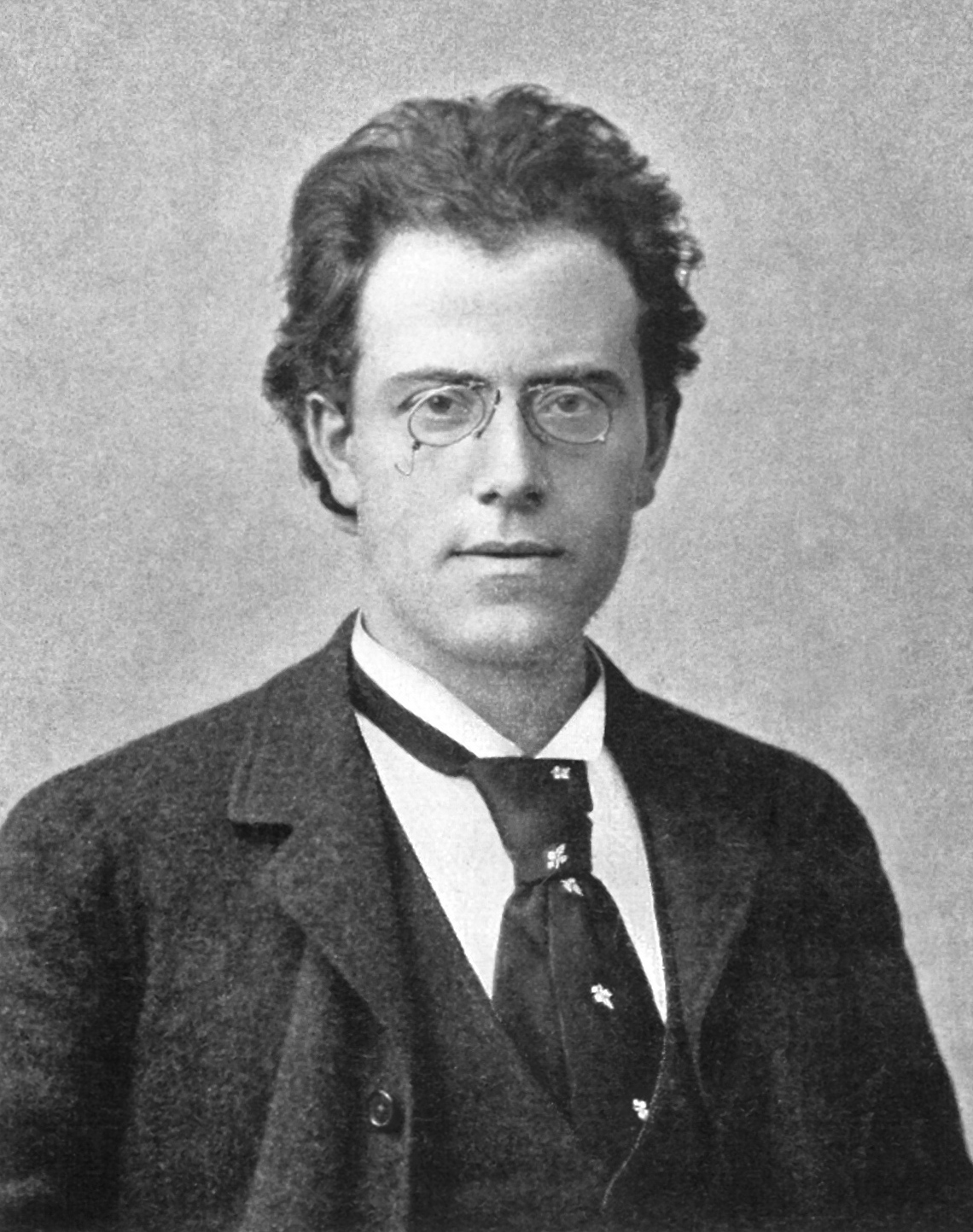
- The composer in 1893
- English: Song of Lamentation
- Text: by Mahler
- Based on: fairy-tale
- Composed: from 1878
- Movements: three
- Scoring: soprano, contralto, tenor, baritone, boy soprano, boy alto; mixed choir; orchestra; offstage orchestra

Premiere
- Date: 17 February 1901
- Location: Vienna
- Conductor: Mahler

Das klagende Lied (Song of Lamentation) is a cantata by Gustav Mahler, composed between 1878 and 1880 and greatly revised over the next two decades. In its original form, Das klagende Lied is the earliest of his works to have survived.

== Compositional history ==
Mahler began to write the text of Das klagende Lied during the early part of his final year in the Vienna Conservatory, where he was a student between 1875 and 1878. It is based on "Der singende Knochen" ("The Singing Bone") from the collection by Jacob and Wilhelm Grimm. The draft text for the work is dated 18 March 1878, and composition of the music began in autumn of 1879. It was completed in November 1880.

As originally composed, Das klagende Lied was in three parts:

1. Waldmärchen (Forest Legend)
2. Der Spielmann (The Minstrel)
3. Hochzeitsstück (Wedding Piece)

The first performance did not take place until 1901, by which time Mahler had subjected his original score to several major revisions. The first revision of the work took place in the second half of 1893. This featured a significant reduction and re-arrangement of the orchestral and vocal forces, with the number of harps in the first part being reduced from six to two, and the vocal soloists from eleven to four. The boys’ voices were also removed. The off-stage orchestra, which had played an important role in the original score, was also completely removed from the second and third parts. In spite of having lavished such detailed effort on revising the work's first part, Mahler then decided (Autumn 1893) to omit it completely.

Further revisions to what was now a work in two parts (after the omission of the original first part) were made between September and December 1898. At this point, Mahler's previous decision to remove the off-stage brass was reversed. The 1898 revisions were in fact so extensive that Mahler had to write out an entirely new manuscript score.

== Performance and recording history ==
The first performance of Das klagende Lied took place on 17 February 1901 in Vienna, with Mahler himself conducting. It was in this two-part version that the work was published and entered the repertoire.

The original manuscript of the full three-part version of the work had been in the possession of Alfred Rosé, the son of Arnold Rosé and Justine Mahler. This manuscript eventually entered the collection of Yale University, from which 'Waldmärchen' became available for public performance after its re-attachment to the then-standard two-movement version of the work. A critical edition of the score of the original three-part version was published in 1999, under the general editorship of Reinhold Kubik.

=== Discography ===
==== First published version (two movements) ====
- Mercury MG10102: Ilona Steingruber, Sieglinde Wagner, Erich Majkut; Vienna State Opera Orchestra; Wiener Kammerchor; Zoltán Fekete (1951)
- Delysé DS 6087: Teresa Żylis-Gara, Anna Reynolds, Andor Kaposy; London Symphony Orchestra; The Ambrosian Singers; Wyn Morris (1967)
- Philips 6500 587: Heather Harper, Norma Procter, Werner Hollweg; Concertgebouw Orchestra Amsterdam; Netherlands Radio Choir; Bernard Haitink
- RCO Live 06004: Hanneke van Bork, Norma Procter, Ernst Haefliger; Concertgebouw Orchestra Amsterdam; Groot Omroepkoor; Bernard Haitink (live performance from February 1973; commercial issue from 2006)
- Supraphon 1121239: Marta Boháčová, Věra Soukupová, Ivo Žídek; Prague Symphony Orchestra; Czech Philharmonic Chorus; Herbert Ahlendorf (1973)
- Hungaroton CLD4010: Katalin Szendrenyi, Klára Takács, Denes Gulyas; Hungarian Radio and Television Chorus, Budapest Symphony Orchestra; András Ligeti (2014, CD reissue)
- MDG MDG9371804: Manuela Uhl, Lioba Braun, Werner Gura; Beethoven Orchester Bonn; Czech Philhamonic Chorus Brno; Stefan Blunier (2013)
- Deutsche Grammophon 289 477-989-1: Dorothea Röschmann, Anna Larsson, Johan Botha (tenor); Vienna Philharmonic Orchestra; Chorus of the Wiener Staatsoper; Pierre Boulez (2013)
- SOMM ARIADNE 5022-2: Joan Sutherland, Norma Procter, Peter Pears; London Symphony Orchestra; Goldsmiths Choral Union; Walter Goehr (live recording from 13 May 1956; first commercial issue in 2023)

==== Full version (three movements) ====
- Columbia Masterworks M2 30061: Elisabeth Söderström (Part 1), Evelyn Lear (Parts 2 and 3), Grace Hoffman (Parts 1-3), Ernst Haefliger (Part 1), Stuart Burrows (Parts 2 and 3), Gerd Nienstedt (Part 1); London Symphony Orchestra; London Symphony Chorus; Pierre Boulez (1970)
- Decca 289 425-719-2: Susan Dunn, Brigitte Fassbaender, Markus Baur (boy alto), Werner Hollweg, Andreas Schmidt; Berlin Radio Symphony Orchestra; Städtischer Musikverein Düsseldorf; Riccardo Chailly (1990)
- EMI Classics CDC 7 47089 2: Helena Döse, Alfreda Hodgson, Robert Tear, Sean Rae; City of Birmingham Symphony Orchestra; City of Birmingham Symphony Chorus; Simon Rattle (1985)
- Deutsche Grammophon: Cheryl Studer, Waltraud Meier, Reiner Goldberg, Thomas Allen; Philharmonia Orchestra, Shin-Yu Kai Choir; Giuseppe Sinopoli (live recording from Tokyo, November 1990)
- Chandos 0095115924723: Joan Rodgers, Linda Finnie, Hans Peter Blochwitz, Robert Hayward; Bournemouth Symphony Orchestra; Waynflete Singers, Bath Festival Chorus; Richard Hickox (1994)
- RCA 09026-68599-2: Marina Shaguch, Michelle DeYoung, Thomas Moser, Sergei Leiferkus; San Francisco Symphony Orchestra; San Francisco Symphony Chorus; Michael Tilson Thomas (1997)
- Erato 3984-21664-2: Eva Urbanová, Jadwiga Rappé, Hans Peter Blochwitz, Håkan Hagegård, Terence Wey (boy soprano), Otto Jaus (boy alto); Hallé Orchestra; Hallé Choir; Kent Nagano (1998)
- ICA Classics ICAC5080: Teresa Cahill, Dame Janet Baker, Robert Tear, Gwynne Howell; BBC Symphony Orchestra; BBC Singers, BBC Symphony Chorus; Gennady Rozhdestvensky (live recording from 20 July 1981, Royal Albert Hall, London; commercial release in 2012)
- Capriccio C5316: Simone Schneider, Tanja Ariane Baumgartner, Torsten Kerl, Adrián Erőd, Camilo Diaz Delegado, Juyoung Kim; ORF Vienna Radio Symphony Orchestra; Wiener Singakademie, Soloists of the Tölzer Knabenchor; Cornelius Meister (2018)
- Orfeo C210021: Brigitte Poschner-Klebel, Marjana Lipovsek, David Rendall, Manfred Hemm; Vienna Radio Symphony Orchestra; Wiener Singakademie; Michael Gielen (2021)

== Analysis ==
Martin Zenck has written a philological analysis of the full three-part version of the work, with discussion of the various dramatic and musical links elucidated in the three-part version compared to the two-part version. Sherry Lee has written a detailed meta-analysis of narrative aspects of the work, including temporal shifts in the presentation of the story from past tense to present tense in the text, and discussion of the idea of musical performance itself as an integral aspect of the story.

== Instrumentation ==
Woodwinds

3 flutes (2nd and 3rd doubling on piccolo)
2 oboes
English horn
2 clarinets in B♭ (both also in A, C and E flat)
Bass clarinet in B♭ (doubling as 3rd clarinet in B or C)
3 bassoons (3rd doubling on contrabassoon)

Brass

4 horns
4 trumpets in F
3 trombones
tuba

Percussion for 4 percussionists

triangle
cymbals
tamtam
bass drum
timpani

String instruments

2 harps
strings

Offstage Orchestra

piccolo
2 flutes (preferably flutes in D♭)
2 oboes
2 clarinets in E♭
2 clarinets in B♭
4 horns in F
2 trumpets in B♭ (or flugelhorns)
timpani
triangle
cymbals

Vocals

mixed choir (SATB)
vocal soloists: soprano, contralto, tenor, baritone, boy soprano, boy alto.

== Synopsis ==
Part I: Waldmärchen (Forest Legend)

A beautiful yet scornful queen decides to hold a contest, the winner of which will be awarded her hand in marriage. The knight who finds a red flower in the forest, she announces, will be judged the winner. Two brothers in particular, one kind and chivalrous, the other wicked and blasphemous, venture into the thicket to find the elusive flower. The gallant brother quickly finds the flower, places it in his cap, and dozes off in the field. Coming upon this scene, the wayward brother draws his sword and kills his sibling, seizing the flower for himself.

Part II: Der Spielmann (The Minstrel)

A minstrel, wandering through the forest, stumbles across a bleached bone in the shade of a willow tree and carves it into a flute. The slain brother sings through the flute, telling the minstrel the details of his unfortunate death. The minstrel resolves to find the queen and inform her of what he has learned.

Part III: Hochzeitsstück (Wedding Piece)

On the same day the minstrel is to arrive at the castle to divulge his discovery, a celebration in honour of the queen's marriage takes place. The murderer-knight, quiet and pale, reflects morbidly on his rash course of action. The minstrel arrives and plays the slain knight's bone-flute. The king-to-be confiscates the flute, but upon playing it himself is accused by his brother of ending his life early for an unjust reason. Pandemonium ensues: the queen faints, the partygoers flee, and the castle collapses.
