= Georg Hellmesberger =

Georg Hellmesberger may refer to:

- Georg Hellmesberger, Sr. (1800–1873), Austrian violinist, conductor and composer, father of Georg Jr.
- Georg Hellmesberger, Jr. (1830–1852), Austrian violinist and composer, son of Georg Sr.
