= Joseph Hellmesberger =

Joseph Hellmesberger may refer to:

- Joseph Hellmesberger Sr. (1828–1893), Austrian violinist and conductor
- Joseph Hellmesberger Jr. (1855–1907), his son, Austrian composer, violinist and conductor
