= Carl Heissler =

Austrian violinist and violist (1823 - 1878)

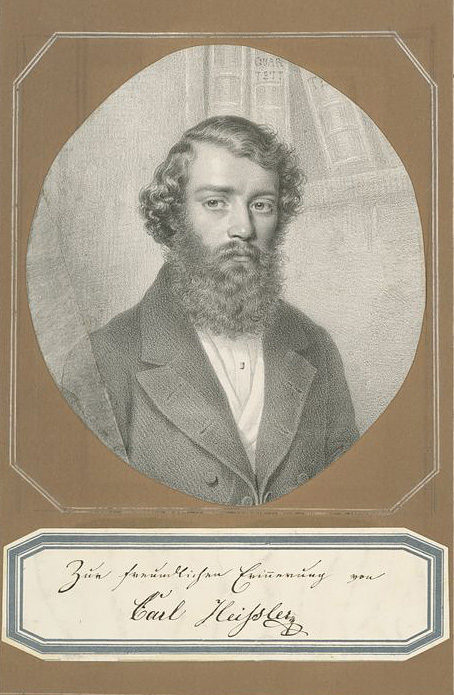
- Carl Heissler
- Born: 18 January 1823
- Died: 13 November 1878 (aged 55)
- Occupation: Austrian musician

Carl or Karl Heissler (18 January 1823 – 13 November 1878) was an Austrian violinist and violist.

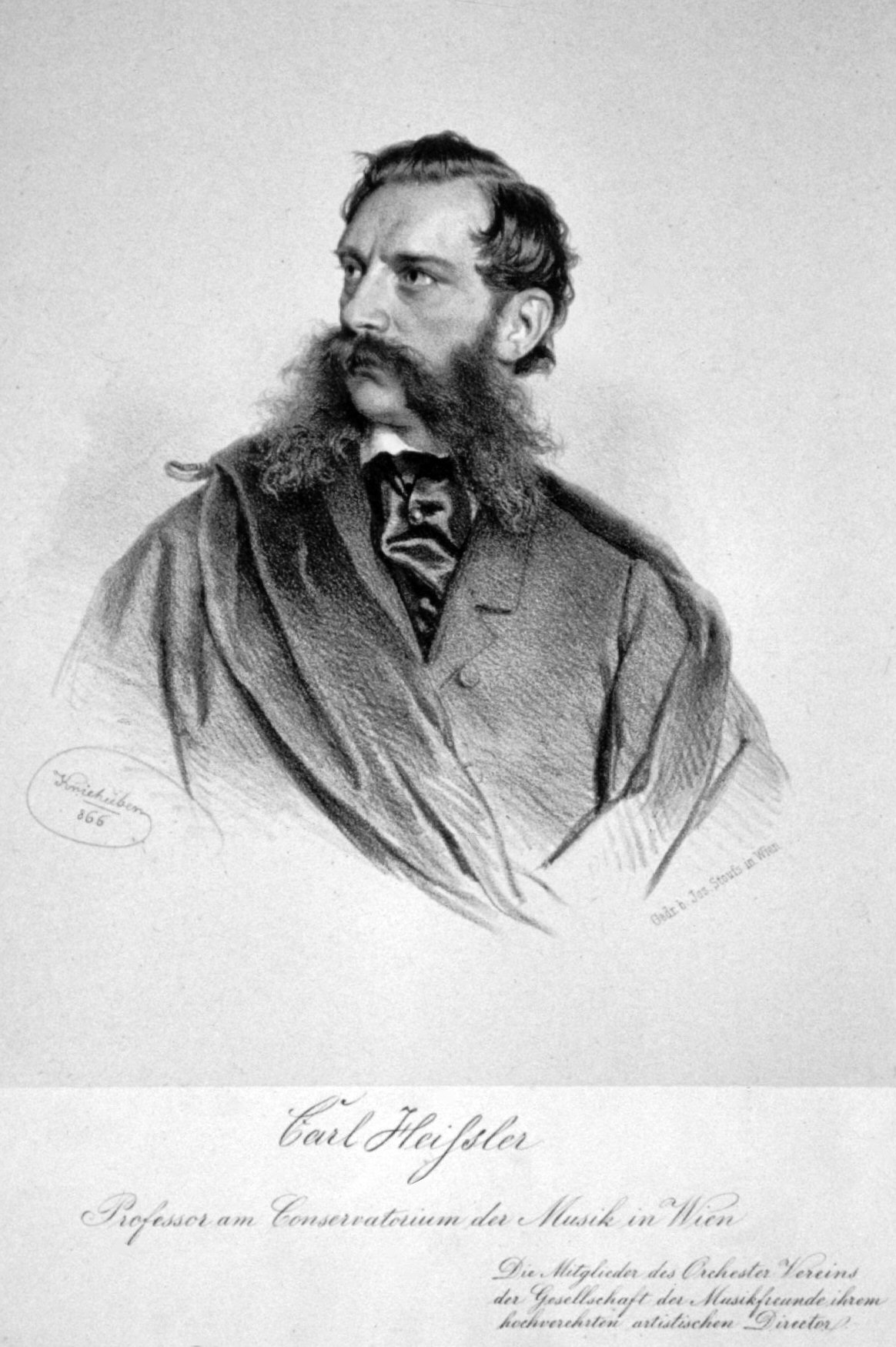
Carl Heissler, Lithography by Josef Kriehuber, 1866

== Biography ==
He studied with Joseph Hellmesberger, Sr., Matthias Durst and Joseph Böhm at the Academy of the Vienna Music Friends Society. In 1841 he entered the orchestra of the Vienna Opera and from 1843, he was also member of the Orchestra of the Imperial Court. From 1849, he played as second violin in the quartet Joseph Hellmesberger, Sr. took over from Leopold Jansa, which he named Hellmesberger Quartet. Joseph Hellmesberger, Jr., the son of Heissler's professor, replaced Carl Heissler as second violin in 1870. Heissler taught at the Vienna Conservatoire, where his students included Julius Winkler, Arnold Rosé, Hans Wessely and Franz Schalk.

He was the first Director of the orchestral association of the Gesellschaft der Musikfreunde (1869) in Vienna. His successor was Anton Rubinstein (1871), followed by Johannes Brahms (1872).
