= Emanuel Feuermann =

Austrian cellist (1902–1942)

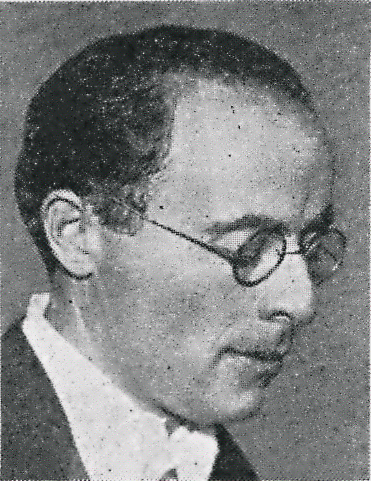
Emanuel Feuermann

Emanuel Feuermann (November 22, 1902 – May 25, 1942) was an internationally celebrated cellist in the first half of the 20th century.

== Life ==
Feuermann was born in 1902 in Kolomyja, Galicia, Austro-Hungarian Empire (now Kolomyia, Ukraine) to Jewish parents. Both of his parents were amateur musicians. His father, who played the violin and cello, was his first teacher. His older brother Sigmund was also musically talented, and their little sister, Sophie (born January 1908) was the piano prodigy in the family. Their father decided to move the family to Vienna in 1907 for Sigmund to start his professional career there. At the age of nine, Emanuel received lessons from Friedrich Buxbaum, principal cello of the Vienna Philharmonic, and then studied with Anton Walter at the University of Music and Performing Arts Vienna. In February 1914, the eleven-year-old prodigy made his concert debut, playing Joseph Haydn's Cello Concerto in D major with the Vienna Philharmonic under Felix Weingartner.

External audio
- Feuermann performing Johannes Brahms' Double Concerto in A minor for Violin, Cello and Orchestra, Op. 102 with Jascha Heifetz, Eugene Ormandy conducting the Philadelphia Orchestra in 1939
- Feuermann performing Franz Schubert's Trio No. 1 in B-flat major, Op. 99 with Jascha Heifetz and Arthur Rubinstein in 1941

In 1917, Feuermann went to Leipzig to study with legendary cellist Julius Klengel. In 1919 cellist Friedrich Wilhelm Ludwig Grützmacher (1866–1919), the nephew of Friedrich Grützmacher, died, and Klengel recommended Feuermann for Grützmacher's position at the Gürzenich Conservatory in Cologne. He was also appointed principal cellist of the Gürzenich Orchestra, by its conductor (who was also the conservatory director), Hermann Abendroth. Feuermann became cellist of the Bram Elderling Quartet. At that time, he also joined a short-lived piano trio with his brother and pianist-conductor Bruno Walter. In 1929, Feuermann became professor at the Musikhochschule in Berlin and taught there for the next four years. He performed during this time with violinists Carl Flesch, Szymon Goldberg, Joseph Wolfsthal and composer Paul Hindemith, the latter playing viola in a string trio with Feuermann and Wolfsthal (later Goldberg; see below). He also performed with Jascha Heifetz, William Primrose and Arthur Rubinstein.

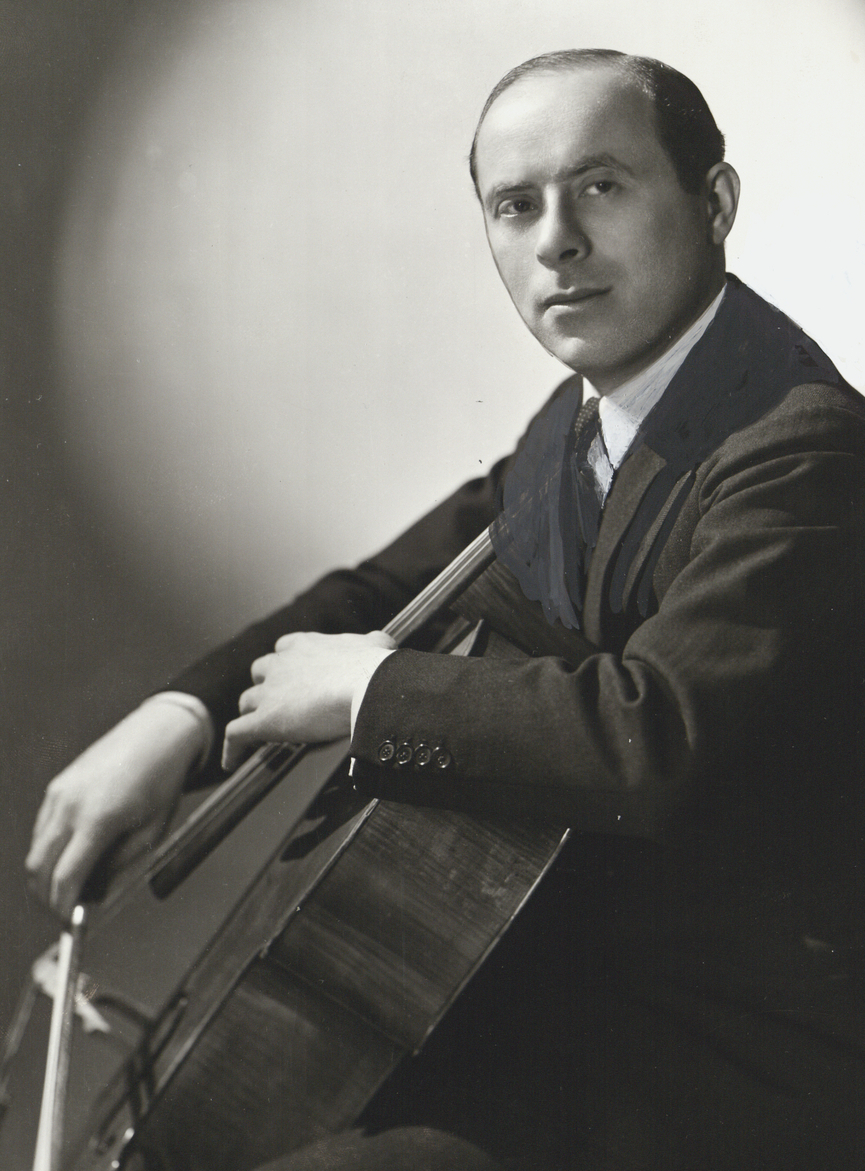

On April 3, 1933, the newly installed Nazi regime dismissed him from his position at the Berlin Conservatory due to his Jewish heritage. He moved to London along with Goldberg and Hindemith, where the trio recorded Beethoven's early Serenade in D major for string trio, Op. 8, and a string trio by Hindemith, for Columbia Records. He toured Japan and the United States then returned to London, where he married Eva Reifenberg (a cousin of Katja Andy) in 1935, with whom he had a daughter, Monica. Following the premiere of Arnold Schoenberg's Cello Concerto under Sir Thomas Beecham he lived for some time in Zürich, but happened to be in Vienna at the time of the 1938 Anschluss. Violinist Bronisław Huberman helped Feuermann and his family escape to British Palestine. From there they moved to the United States later that year.

He taught privately, and at the Curtis Institute of Music in Philadelphia, until his death. During these years he collaborated with the pianist Vladimir Sokoloff. Among his notable pupils were Bernard Greenhouse, Suzette Forgues Halasz, Florence Hooton, Robert Lamarchina, Alan Shulman, David Soyer and August Wenzinger. In the United States, he made several celebrated chamber-music recordings with Heifetz, Rubinstein and others. His relationship with Hindemith suffered when the latter chose Gregor Piatigorsky to premiere his Cello Concerto.

Feuermann died in New York City due to complications during surgery on May 25, 1942, at the age of 39.

== Evaluation ==
External audio
- Feuermann performing Johannes Brahms' Trio No. 1 in B major, Op. 8, with violinist Jasha Heifetz and pianist Arthur Rubinstein in 1941

Klengel wrote of Feuermann, "Of all those who have been entrusted to my guardianship, there has never been such a talent...our divinely favoured artist and lovable young man." Heifetz declared that talent like Feuermann's comes once every one hundred years. Indeed, after Feuermann's untimely death it took seven years for Heifetz to collaborate with another cellist, Gregor Piatigorsky.

Artur Rubinstein was equally emphatic: "He became for me the greatest cellist of all times, because I did hear Pablo Casals at his best. He (Casals) had everything in the world, but he never reached the musicianship of Feuermann. And this is a declaration." Both Heifetz and Rubinstein were longtime trio partners with Feuermann. During his first tour of the United States in 1935–36, Feuermann reaped enthusiastic reviews from music critics. After a 1938 Proms performance in London, critic Reid Steward of The Strad wrote "I do not think there can any longer be doubt that Feuermann is the greatest living cellist, Casals alone excepted..."

The honorary pallbearers at his funeral included some of the greatest musicians of the time: pianists Rudolf Serkin and Artur Schnabel, violinists Mischa Elman and Bronisław Huberman, and conductors George Szell, Eugene Ormandy and Arturo Toscanini. During the procession Toscanini broke down crying, exclaiming, "This is murder!" In 1954, when asked which cellists he particularly admired, Casals said, "What a great artist Feuermann was! His early death was a great loss to music."

== Feuermann's cellos ==
In 1929, Feuermann purchased a cello made by David Tecchler in Rome in 1741. From 1932, he also owned an instrument made by Venetian master luthier Domenico Montagnana in 1735. This instrument, known as the Feuermann cello, is presently in the hands of a Swiss cellist and collector. It was larger and wider than the Tecchler.

Feuermann later owned the De Munck Stradivarius cello of 1730. It was previously owned by the distinguished Brazilian-American cellist, Aldo Parisot, and was on extended loan from the Nippon Foundation to cellist Steven Isserlis from 1998 to 2011, and it is currently on loan to Camille Thomas since 2019.

Feuermann is also said to have owned and played a Goffriller cello later owned by American cellist Joseph Schuster; from Schuster, it was passed on to Jascha Silberstein.

== Discography ==
Feuermann is featured on recordings including:

- The Art of Emanuel Feuermann (1969)
- The English Columbias, Vol. 1 (1990)
- The English Columbias, Vol. 2 (1990)
- The English Columbias, Vol. 3 (1991)
- The Emanuel Feuermann Edition: The Complete English Columbia Recordings & Early German Parlophone Recordings (2016)
