= Sigismund Bachrich =

Hungarian musician

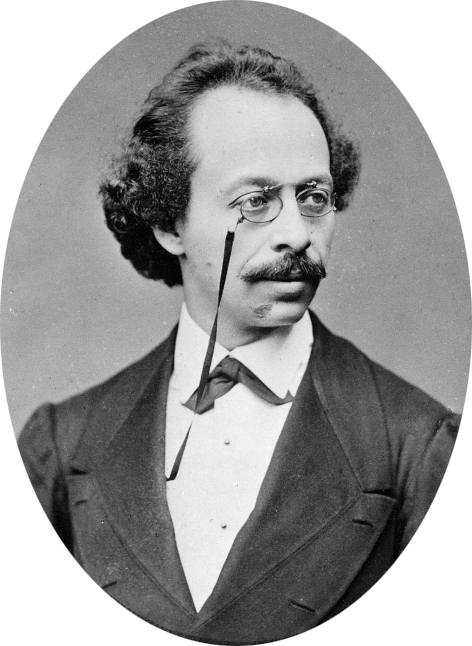

Sigismund Bachrich (23 January 1841 – 16 July 1913), aka Sigmund Bachrich or Siegmund Bachrich, was a Hungarian composer, violinist, and violist of Jewish origin.

He was born in Žabokreky in 1841. He studied violin at the Vienna Conservatoire from 1851 to 1857 with Joseph Böhm.

He was Kapellmeister at the Paris Théâtre Lyrique from 1866 to 1869, when he returned to Vienna. He joined the Vienna Philharmonic as violist, remaining until 1899. He was a professor at the Vienna Conservatory until 1894.

He played the viola with the Hellmesberger Quartet from 1869, then joined the Rosé Quartet in 1890.

He died in Austria, either in Grimmenstein or Vienna.

He composed for the opera, including Muzzedin (1883), Heini von Steier (1884), and Der Fuchs-Major (1889).

His memoirs were published posthumously, in 1914, under the title Aus verklungenen Zeiten; Erinnerungen eines alten Musikers.

== Selected works ==
Stage

- Muzzedin, Opera (1883)
- Heini von Steier, Opera in 1 act (1884); libretto by Hugo Wittmann
- Sakuntala, Ballet (1884)
- Der Fuchs-Major, Operetta (1889)
- Des Herdes und der Liebe Flammen, Operetta
- Mahomeds Paradies, Operetta

Chamber music

- Impromptu for violin and piano (1862)
- Im Dorfe, Idylle for violin and piano (1864)
- 5 Stücke for violin and piano, Op. 4 (1869)
- Suite for violin and piano, Op. 7 (1872)
- Capriccio, Madrigal und Mazurka for violin and piano (1881)
- 5 kleine Charakterstücke for violin and piano (1889)

Piano

- Fuscher-Tänze, Ländler for piano 4-hands, Op. 10 (1872)
- Fuscher-Tänze (Neue Folge) for piano 4-hands (1878)
- Aus den Alpen, Oberösterreichische Tänze for piano 4-hands (1881)

Vocal

- 6 Lieder for voice and piano, Op. 5 (1872)
- 5 altdeutsche Lieder aus dem 16. Jahrhundert for voice and piano, Op. 14 (1873)
