= Eduard Rosé =

German musician

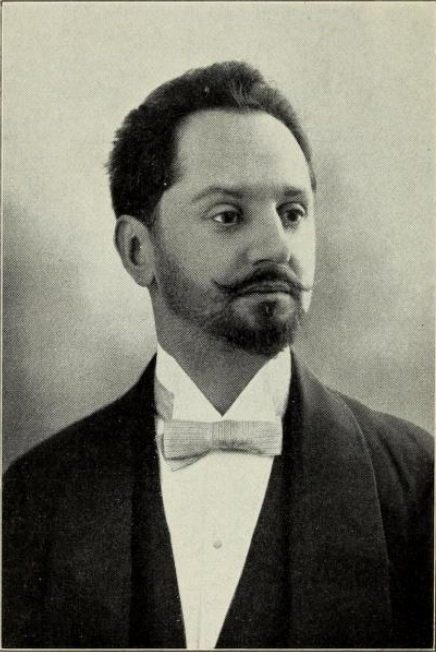
Eduard Rosé

Eduard Rosé (born Eduard Rosenblum (29 March 1859 – 24 January 1943) was a German cellist and concert master.

== Life ==
Born in Iași (Romania), Born "Rosenblum", Rosé received his artistic education at the conservatory of the Gesellschaft der Musikfreunde from 1876 to 1879, where Karl Udel and Reinhold Hummer taught him cello playing. One of his fellow students was Gustav Mahler. Rosenblum made his debut as a concert musician in the Austrian capital on 11 July 1878. In 1882 he formed the Rosé Quartet with Arnold Josef Rosé, one of his three brothers, and two other musicians and from then on called himself Eduard Rosé. After only one year he concentrated on his solo career. Rosé worked as a cellist at the Royal Opera of Budapest, the Boston Symphony Orchestra (1898), the Berlin Philharmonic and finally (since September 1900) the Weimar State Orchestra. At the Deutsches Nationaltheater und Staatskapelle Weimar there, Rosé was appointed First Cellist and held this position until his retirement in 1926. At Weimar's conservatory, Rosé also gave cello and piano lessons to students.

Although he converted to Protestantism in 1891, Rosé was still considered a Jew from 1933 onwards by the National Socialists, who had just come to power, and imposed appropriate restrictions. After his wife Emma Marie Eleanor Rosé-Mahler (1875–1933), Gustav Mahler's youngest sister, died in the year of the Machtergreifung, Rosé was defenceless against the harassment and repressions of the Nazis. In 1941, the old man was taken away by the Gestapo for a harsh interrogation, because he had refused to wear the Judenstern in public, which has been obligatory for Jews since that year, and had not signed a letter with the second name "Israel", which has been obligatory for Jews since 1938. After that, the once celebrated cellist had to move to the so-called ghetto house reserved for Jews in Weimar's Belvederer Allee 6. Both he and his niece, Alma Rosé, were eventually deported. On 20 September 1942, Rosé was deported from there to the Theresienstadt Ghetto, where he enjoyed a special position as a "celebrity prisoner" (like Mahler's brother-in-law, a preferred composer of Adolf Hitler). The musician emeritus died there in the early hours of 24 January 1943 at the age of 83, the official cause of death being "enteritis intestinal catarrh". His two sons Wolfgang and Ernst managed to escape to the United States in 1939 and 1941

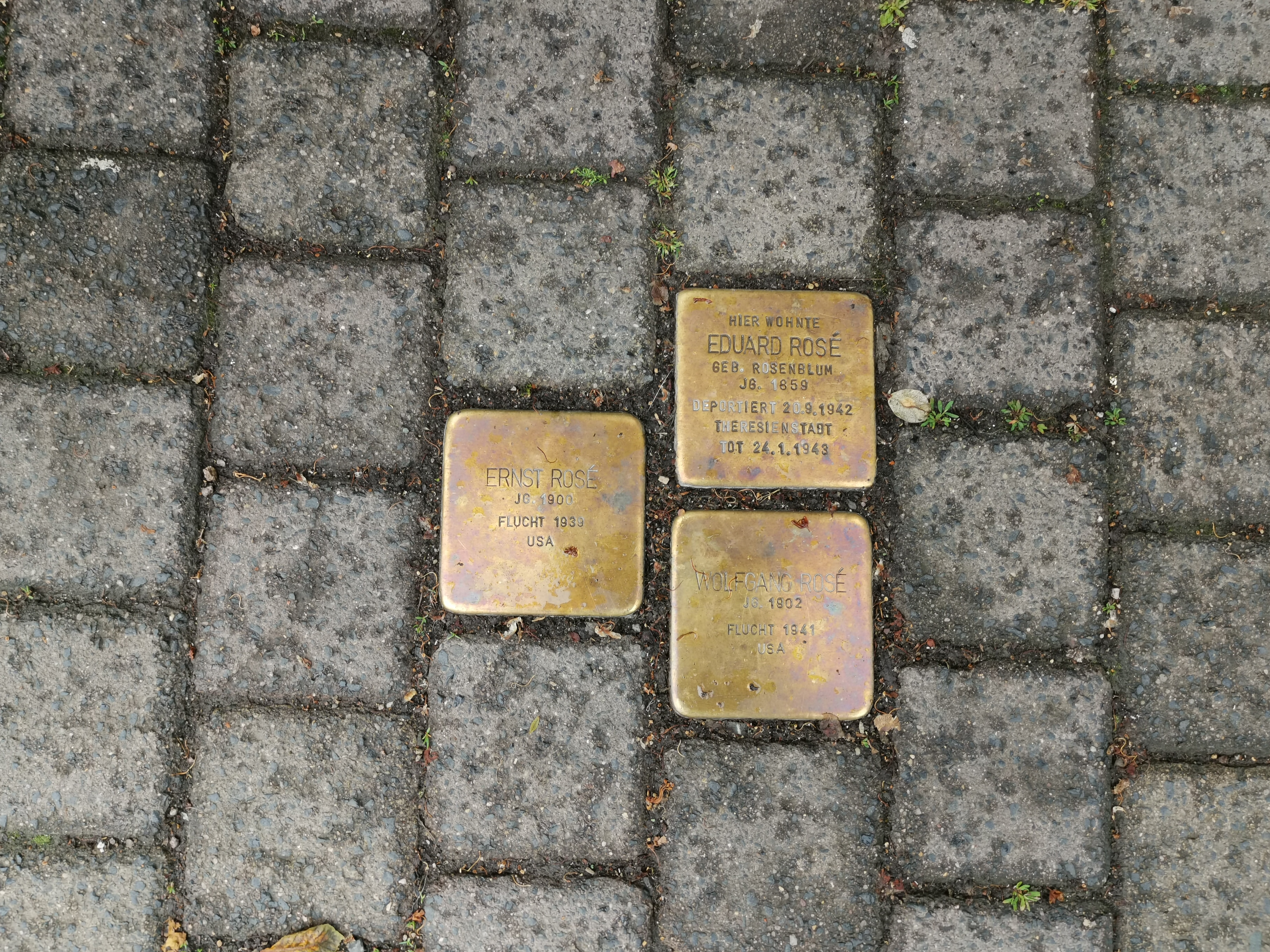
Stolpersteine

For him and his sons, three Stolpersteine were affixed in Weimar.

== Literature ==
- Bernhard Post: Eduard Rosé. Ein Musikerschicksal im Spannungsfeld zwischen europäischer Kultur und deutscher Provinz. in Mainzer Zeitschrift, Mittelrheinisches Jahrbuch für Archäologie, Kunst und Geschichte, Jg. 96/97, 2001/2002, pp. 417–435.
- Kay Weniger: Zwischen Bühne und Baracke. Lexikon der verfolgten Theater-, Film- und Musikkünstler 1933 bis 1945. With a foreword by Paul Spiegel. Metropol, Berlin 2008, ISBN 978-3-938690-10-9, p. 409.
