= Hans Wessely =

Austrian violinist (1862 - 1926)

Hans Wessely (23 December 1862 – 29 September 1926) was an Austrian violinist.

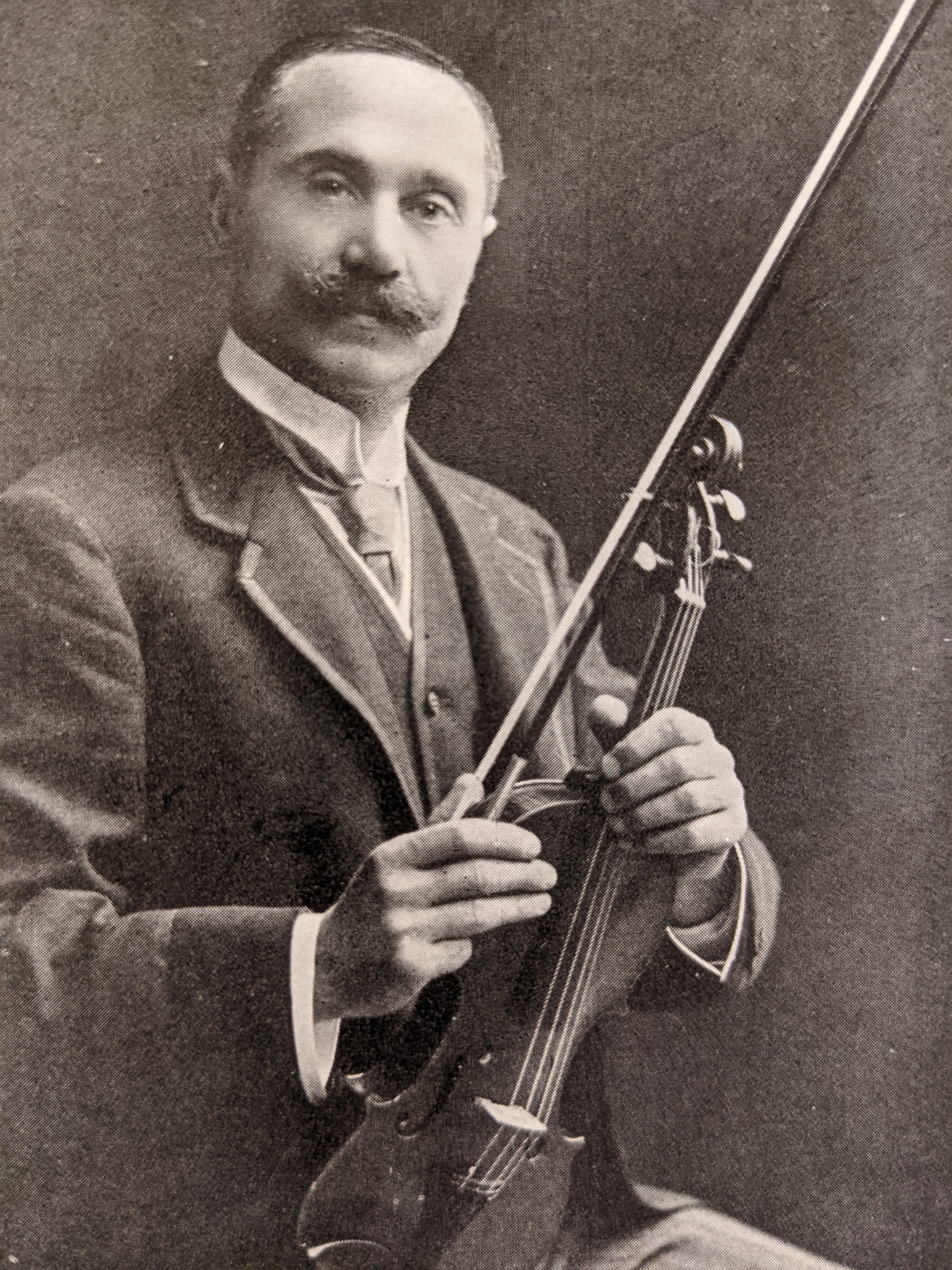
A photograph (c.1910) of the Austrian violinist Hans Wessely

== Biography ==
He was born in Vienna in 1862 and died in Innsbruck in 1926. He studied at the Vienna Conservatory with Karl Heissler and Josef Hellmesberger, Sr. from 1873 to 1878. Afterwards he also studied privately with Jakob Grün.

He debuted with the Vienna Philharmonic Society in 1883. He subsequently toured Europe and visited England in 1888. From 1889 he was professor at the Royal Academy of Music. He performed at the London Proms. He established the Wessely Quartet. He worked with Hans Richter, August Manns, Henry Wood, Alexander Mackenzie, York Bowen and Arthur Sullivan. He taught Spencer Dyke, Albert Sandler, Percy Hilder Miles, E. Florence Whitlock, Lionel Tertis and Rebecca Clarke, (before the latter two changed to viola).

Wessely played on the Deurbroucq Stradivarius violin, 1727, gifted to him in 1903 by pupils and friends at the Royal Academy of Music.

== Works ==
He published A Practical Guide to Violin Playing and Comprehensive Scale Manual. He edited Jakob Dont's Etudes et caprices, op.35.
