= William Maurice Miles =

English musician (1883–1958)

William Maurice Miles (25 March, 1883 – 9 September, 1958) was an English composer and cellist, active in Canada from 1905 until his death.

Miles was born into a musical family living in Crayford, Kent. His father was George Miles (a building contractor) and his mother Fanny Hood: she played the piano. His uncle Willie played the violin, his elder brother Percy Hilder Miles was a child prodigy violinist and became a prolific composer. His two younger brothers played the viola and cello. As a result the early chamber music compositions of both William and Percy were often tried out at home first. W. Maurice Miles studied cello and composition at the Royal Academy of Music between 1899 until 1902. Arnold Bax was a contemporary at the College.

1n 1905 he emigrated to Canada where he married Naemi Johnson in 1913: there were two children. Miles played as a cellist in the theatre orchestra in Winnipeg, moving to Vancouver in 1923, where he was Principal Cello of the Vancouver Symphony Orchestra during the 1930s.

William Stantan Miles in Canada holds archive material, including a series of 117 letters written by Percy Hilder Miles to Maurice between 1905 and 1921 containing comments on his musical point of view about his compositions and music in general. His compositions include a Cello Sonata (circa 1914) and the Sonata for Horn and Piano (1929), a copy of which was included in the library of Dennis Brain. The Horn Sonata has been recorded. Miles also collaborated with the Canadian composer Jean Coulthard on several occasions and orchestrated her song cycle Night Wind (1952).
