= Alfred Rosé =

Austrian conductor and composer (1902–1975)

Alfred Edward Rosé
- Born: 11 December 1902; Vienna
- Died: 7 May 1975 (aged 72); London, Ontario, Canada
- Occupations: Composer and conductor

Alfred Eduard Emmerich Rosé (11 December 1902, Vienna –7 May 1975, London, Ontario, Canada) was an Austrian composer and conductor.

He was the elder brother of Alma Rosé, son of Arnold Rosé, and the nephew of Gustav Mahler. He studied in Vienna under Richard Robert.

Rosé's music and ability to perform had been revoked by the Reichsmusikkammer, so he and his wife departed Vienna, Austria for the United States on 28 September 1938. While in America, Alfred Rosé began teaching and his pieces were being performed again.

== See also ==
- Arnold Rosé
- Eduard Rosé
