= E. Florence Whitlock =

British composer, conductor and educator (1889 - 1978)

Ellen Florence Williams Whitlock (10 November 1889 – 13 October 1978) was a British composer, conductor and educator who was known professionally as E. Florence Whitlock.

== Biography ==
Whitlock was born in Redruth, Cornwall, England. She studied violin with H. V. Pearce and Hans Wessely, piano with Frederick Moore, composition with Alan Bush, and performed with the Camborne and Redruth Oratorio Orchestra. Whitlock attended the Royal Academy of Music, as well as a Music Teachers' Association training course. From 1911 to 1912, she taught in Bury St. Edmunds and later in Taunton and Ashford, Kent, where she also conducted the local orchestra.

Whitlock moved to New Zealand in 1925 and married in 1926. She taught violin, cello, and chamber music at Iona College from 1928 to 1935. She conducted the Hastings Orchestral Society and performed in Hastings and Napier. She taught privately from 1937 to 1950, then returned to Kent where she taught privately until 1960. Whitlock was a member of the Composers' Guild of Great Britain.

== Compositions ==
Her compositions include:

=== Chamber ===
- Concerto for Seven Solo Instruments, opus 15 (violin, viola, cello, double bass, clarinet and horn; 1965)
- Evening, opus 11 (violin and piano; 1961)
- Fantasia for Strings, opus 17
- Gavotte (violin; 1968)
- Quintet, opus 12 (flute and string quartet; 1964)
- Sad Story, opus 11 (string ensemble; 1971)
- Scherzo, opus 11 (violin and piano; 1963)
- Spring Song, opus 1 (violin and piano; 1960)
- String Quartet No. 1, opus 7 (1959)
- String Quartet No. 2, opus 7 (1961)
- String Quartet No. 3, opus 7 (1962)
- String Quintet, opus 17 (2 violins, viola, and 2 celli; 1968)
- Two Trios, opus 19 (2 violins and piano; 1972)
- Variations on a Theme of Corelli (violin; 1968)

=== Orchestra ===
- Violin Concerto No 1, opus 9 (1963)
- Violin Concerto No 2, opus 14 (1964)

=== Piano ===
- Fairy Garden, opus 4 (1958)
- From Harmony to Harmony
- Theme and Variations on a Folk Tune, opus 2 (1955)

=== Vocal ===
- Aye Me
- Chorus with String Chamber Orchestra (organ ad lib; 1970)
- Daphne and the Shepherdess
- Ode to St. Cecilia, opus 5 (text by John Dryden; 1958)
- Spring Prayer, opus 16 (2 sopranos and piano; text by Ralph Waldo Emerson; 1968)
