= Percy Hilder Miles =

English musician (1878–1922)

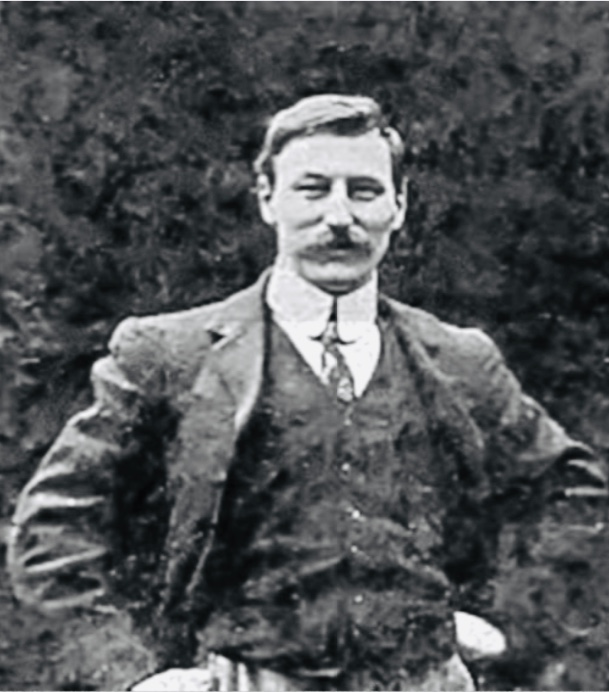
Miles around 1906

Percy Hilder Miles (12 July 1878 – 18 April 1922) was an English composer, violinist and academic. For most of his career he was Professor of Harmony at the Royal Academy of Music. Among his students was the composer Rebecca Clarke, and among Miles' associates was Lionel Tertis.

He was a prolific composer of 160 or so works, most of them unpublished.

== Early life ==
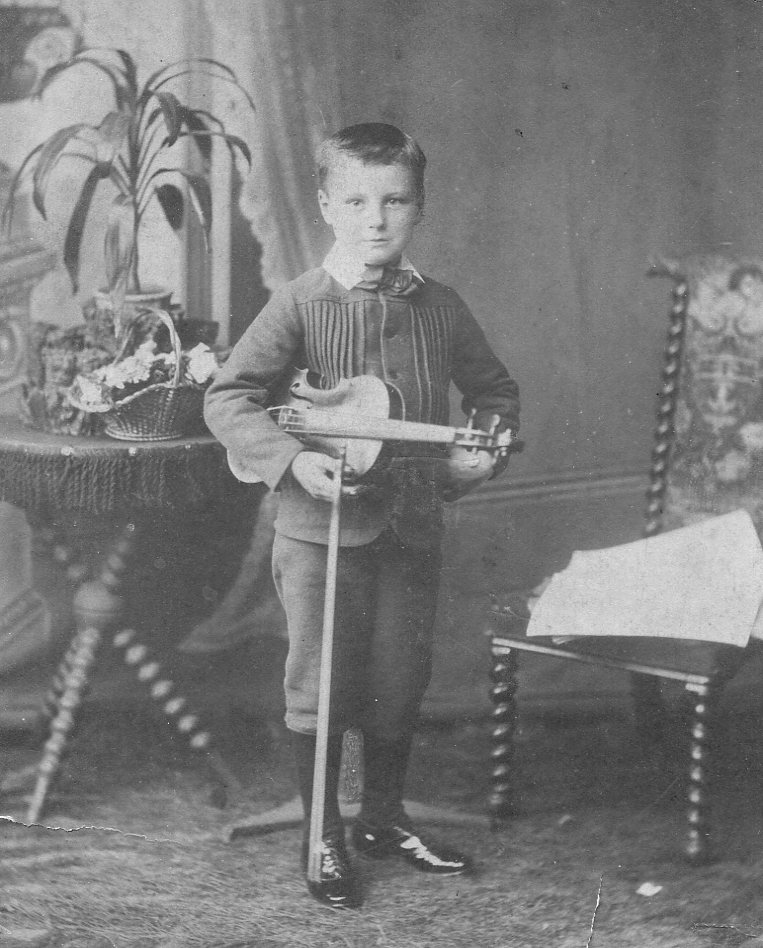
Miles aged 6

Miles was born in Crayford, Kent, to parents George Miles (a building contractor) and Fanny Hood, of Bexleyheath, Kent on 12 July 1878. It was a musical family: his mother played the piano, his uncle Willie the violin, and his three younger brothers were all string players. His brother William Maurice Miles (1883-1958) was a cellist and also a composer. Percy himself learned the violin. His earliest compositions date from when he was eight years-old, and at the age of 13, he performed the Beethoven Violin Concerto at St. James' Hall, Piccadilly, with the Principal of the Royal Academy of Music, Alexander MacKenzie, conducting. Percy became a student at the Royal Academy of Music from June 1893. His teachers there included Francis William Davenport (for harmony), Walter Battison Haynes (for composition) and violinist Hans Wessely.

== Studies and awards ==
In 1895 Miles suggested to Lionel Tertis (then also a violin pupil of Wessely at the RAM) the idea of switching to the viola, in order for them to form a string quartet. His name appeared several times in The Musical Times in the late 1890s connected with performances of his own compositions and for those of other contemporaries. According to a brief biography in one of these articles in 1899, he won the Hine Exhibition composition prize in 1893, the Walter MacFarren Scholarship in 1896 (awarded 8 January 1896) Also in 1896 he received a silver medal (presented annually to the most distinguished student at the Royal Academy of Music, the Royal College of Music, or the Guildhall School of Music, in rotation, the recipient nominated by the principal or director of the school) from the Worshipful Company of Musicians. He won the first Sauret prize in 1897, plus the prestigious Charles Lucas (musician) Medal for composition in mid summer 1898. In 1899 he was awarded the Mendelssohn Scholarship, which was presented to him by Sir John Stainer. This enabled the student to study abroad for 3 years with noted teachers of the day. Between 1899 and 1903, Percy studied in Vienna, Berlin, Karlsruhe, Paris and Milan. As a student he also performed alongside his violin teacher Hans Wessely as second violin for chamber music concerts across London.

== Professional life and Rebecca Clarke ==
He was made a sub-professor at the RAM in 1899 and in 1903, upon his return from Mendelssohn Scholarship studies, Percy became a full professor of Harmony and Counterpoint. Among his Harmony students was Rebecca Clarke who studied there from 1903 to 1905. He had become a friend of the Clarke family in the years before and had recommended she study Harmony with him and the violin with Wessely. However her father removed her from the RAM when Miles suddenly proposed marriage and kissed her after a lesson in 1905. This led to her being enrolled in the Royal College of Music where she studied composition with Charles Villiers Stanford, who suggested she take up the viola which she later studied with Percy's friend Lionel Tertis.

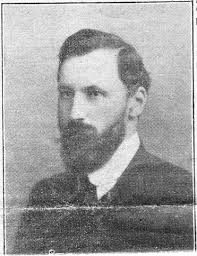
Miles aged 43

In 1906 (at Wessely's suggestion), Miles became an overseas examiner for the Associated Board of the Royal Schools of Music. This led to long periods of travel across the British Empire, including Australia . Percy went around the world no fewer than six times, sometimes visiting his brothers in Canada and relatives in Jamaica and Australia. One of his cousins was the famous Australian water colourist J J Hilder.

A cello concerto by Miles initially dedicated to and rehearsed with Herbert Withers (1880–1961) was announced for performance on 3 September 1908 in Henry Wood's Promenade Concerts. However it was not in fact performed as Miles voyaged to Australia in April 1908 and the orchestral parts were not completed in time. Instead Withers performed the Dvorak Concerto and Percy put a line through the dedication to Withers. The orchestral score is lost, but the cello and piano accompaniment parts survive.

Financially secure from Examining, though still living with his parents in Erith, he paid off his father's mortgage and debts and in 1909 he purchased a grand piano and a Stradivarius violin made in 1720, known as the General Kyd. He bequeathed this to Rebecca Clarke in his Last Will and Testament of 1912.

Although aged 36 at the outbreak of World War I, Percy was keen to enlist. Indeed, despite his age he was called-up several times and presented himself at Woolwich. However he failed the medical on each occasion, either because of his eyesight or weak lungs.

He was reluctant to have his works published although a handful were; his biggest success came in 1920 when his String Sextet, (alongside works by Sir George Dyson, Charles Villiers Stanford and Gustav Holst) was selected from 64 entries for the Carnegie Collection of British Music award, the prize being publication of the score by Stainer & Bell.

== Death ==
In 1922 Miles went blind in one eye and also caught pneumonia which took his life on 18 April of that year. (Note: Death date from an obituary in the June 1922 issue of The Strad, which specifies age (43) and date (18 April). The Rebecca Clarke website, rebeccaclarke.org, confirms year of death 1922.) According to his catalogue, he left over 160 works (mainly chamber music and songs), most of which his mother sent to his brothers in Canada after his death. Some are now deemed lost but there are around 100 manuscripts still with relatives in Canada and around 40 survive in the RAM Archive. He never married and lies buried with his parents in Brook Street cemetery, Erith.

== List of compositions ==
Compositions, mostly in Manuscript, held by the Royal Academy of Music Archive, London include:

- 1891 Vocal duet "Now and Afterward"
- 1893 Song for Sop., Vln., Cello & Pft. "A Golden Radiance" Words by E. Nesbit
- 1893 Song for voice and piano, "Sing to me" Words by Fr.Ryan
- 1893 2 Canons for 2 voices and piano, "Sunset" and "The Singer"
- 1894 Slow movement (only) of Sonata in A minor for violin and piano
- 1894 Song "Weariness" Words by Longfellow
- 1894 Song "When you were here" Words by L Jackson
- 1894 Song "The Seasons" Words by Jane Hood
- 1894–1901 Quintet in A maj for 2 Vlns. 2 vlas. and cello
- 1895 Song "My lady fair" Words by M E Sargent
- 1895 2 songs for voice and piano "When grief shall come to thee", "Go down, thou ruddy sun"
- 1896 Love song for voice and piano "To the cold, dark night" Words by Harold Miles Silvanus
- 1897 Waltz in F sharp minor for piano
- 1897 Septet in E flat for Vln, Vla, Cello, Bass, Clt, Hrn, & Bassoon. (viola part only)
- 1898–1902 4 sets of Variations on Beethoven's "Das Blumchen Wunderhold" for violin, viola & cello
- 1899 5 Songs, words by Robert Burns
- 1900 3 Lieder – "Abendlied", words by Edmund Hoefer, "Am Wege" words by Max Kalbeck, "Im Walde" words by Ludwig Bowitsch
- 1900 3 Songs to words by Ossian- "Pleasant is thy voice, O Carril", "Daughter of Heaven", "Come thou beam"
- 1900 3 Fantasy-Pieces for Cello & Piano
- 1901 Quintet in F minor for 2 Vlns., Vla, Cello & Bass
- 1901 8 Songs for voice & piano. Words by Heine
- 1902 3 Fantasy-pieces for string quartet, (Published by Bote & Bock)
- 1902 Quintet in D for 2 Vlns., Vla., Cello & Bass (in one movt.)
- 1902 18 Metamorphoses on a theme intended to represent a pet dog named "Don" for Vln., Vla., & Cello
- 1902-3 Variations for string quartet on an original theme in A minor
- 1903-4 Quintet for Clarinet, 2 Vlns., Vla., & Cello
- 1904 4 Songs to words by Swinburne
- 1906 3 Shakespeare Sonnets for voice & piano
- 1906 Duet for Vla. & Cello arr. for Vln. & Vla by W Maurice Miles
- 1906 Quartet for 4 Cellos, for W.M.Miles
- 1907 Grand Solo for viola in G, ("To Johnson. So difficult as to be absolutely impossible") for G.D.Miles
- 1907-8 Cello Concerto in D, Piano & Cello parts (Proms 1908 commission)
- 1909 Rhapsody in Eb for violin & piano (No.3 of 3 Pieces for Violin & Piano)
- 1911 Trio No.1 in D for 2 violins & viola
- 1914–15 3 Pieces for Violin & Piano- 1.Intermezzo 2. Capriccio 3. Romanza (Published by Stainer & Bell 1920)
- 1914–16 Cello Sonata in C for Cello & Piano
- 1912–17 Sextet in G minor for 2 Vlns., 2 Vlas., Cello & Bass (Published by Stainer & Bell 1920). Winner of Carnegie Trust Award (alongside Holst's "Hymn of Jesus" and Stanford 5th Symphony)
- 1917 "Sunshine over the Avon" for solo piano. (parody of Schoenberg, written "whilst waiting for dinner")
- 1918 5 Pieces (Interludes) for piano solo
- 1919 2 Songs for voice & piano "In Flanders Fields" words by Lt. Col. John McRae, "England & Flanders" words by H.C F
- 1921 3 Easy Pieces for Violin & Piano (Published posthumously by The Associated Board in Aug 1922)

Miscellaneous items also held by RAM Archive

- Catalog(sic) of the Musical Compositions of Percy Hilder Miles Dec 1907– (updated to 1921). Contains listings of approximately 180 works with dates and locations of composition.
- Two pages from The Strad, vol.XXXI no.370, February 1921 concerning the collection of violins made by George Miles
- Viola part to Stephen Foster's "Old Folks at Home"

Manuscripts held by Percy's great nephew William Stantan Miles in Canada

- 1886 3 Duets facile for 2 violins (Op.1)
- 1888 Trio in C for 3 Violins (Op.3)
- 1893 Song for Sop., Vln., Cello & Pft. "A Golden Radiance" Words by E. Nesbit (parts & score)
- 1893 2 Piano trios in C min & D min
- 1893 One movt. of a string quartet in G "Quartette facile"
- 1893 Song "Greeting" for voice & piano (won Hine prize at RAM Dec 1893)
- 1893 Trio in D min for 2 violins & cello
- 1893-4 Piano Trio in E min (parts & score)
- 1894 6 Canons for 2 voices & piano
- 1894 Cello Sonata in A min
- 1894 Violin Sonata in A min
- 1894 2 string quartets- G min & E maj
- 1894 3 duets for violin & cello- in G, A & D min
- 1894 6 studies for violin
- 1894 2 movts. of a string quartet in G min
- 1894 Melody in G for violin & piano
- 1894 6 Albumleaves for piano
- 1894 Piano quartet in G min
- 1894 Romance & Polacca for cello & piano
- 1894 Violin Sonata in G
- 1894 Song "Weariness" Words by Longfellow
- 1894–1901 Quintet in A for 2 Vlns., 2 Vlas. & Cello (score & parts)
- 1895 Trio in C maj for Vln., Vla. & Cello
- 1895 2 Children's pieces in A & G for violin & piano (arr. for Cello & piano c.1900)
- 1895 Serenade- Duet for Vln. & Cello in Eb
- 1895 3 Duets for female voices and piano (No.1- "Life and Song" words by R E Burton- only)
- 1895 3 Quartets for SATB & piano
- 1895 Piano Trio in C min
- 1895 Te Deum in E flat SATB choir & piano
- 1895 "Autumn song" for tenor, violin & piano. Words by Wilfred Browne
- 1895-6 6 Songs with piano
- 1896 6 Songs with piano
- 1896 Andante in A flat for piano
- 1896 Andante & Rondo for violin & piano
- 1896 2 sets of variations (in D & G min) on original themes for string quartet
- 1896 4 Part Songs (Madrigals) in 5 & 6 parts
- 1896 String quartet in A
- 1896 2 movts. of a violin sonata in D (composed for RAM Charles Lucas Prize- unsuccessful)
- 1896 3 Love-songs for tenor with piano. Words by Harold Silvanus
- 1897 Set of variations on a theme by F W Hood for string quartet
- 1897 Septet in E flat for Vln., Vla., Cello, Bass, Clt., Hrn. & Bassoon- (score)
- 1897 Mass in D for soli, chorus & orchestra (piano score)
- 1897 Waltz in F sharp min for piano
- 1897 Fantasy in D for Violin & Orchestra. (score & parts)
- 1897-8 7 trios for Vln., Vla. & Cello (score)
- 1898 Song for voice and piano "A Song of Dawn" published by Augener & Co. London
- 1898 Piano Quintet in D (one movt.)
- 1898 Flute quartet in D
- 1898 Andante & Rondo in A for piano quintet (winner of Lucas prize at RAM)
- 1898 6 Fantasy pieces for violin & piano
- 1898 5 Lieder for voice & piano (words by Hebbel, Heine and Hauff)
- 1898 Anthem for Tenor, Chorus & Organ "Lord thou hast been our refuge" Psalm XC
- 1898-9 3 Songs. Words by Walter Monck
- 1898–1902 4 sets of Variations on Beethoven's "Das Blumchen Wunderhold" for violin, viola & cello
- 1899 2 Dances- in A & E flat, for piano quintet
- 1899 String Quartet in D (score & parts)
- 1899 Song "From Oversea" words by William Sharp
- 1899 5 Songs for voice and piano (words by R Burns)
- 1899 Dance in C for Piano Quartet (score & parts)
- 1899–1907 Elegiac Fantasy for orchestra (orchestral score & piano duet version from 1901)
- 1900 2 Ballades for piano
- 1900 Song "Maiden mine"
- 1900 Piano Quartet in A min (score & parts)
- 1900 3 Lieder with piano accompaniment.
- 1900 Quintet in G for 2 vlns., vla., cello & bass (score)
- 1900 Song "O Love, my words to thee" words by Chester Ide
- 1900 3 Songs. Words by Ossian
- 1900 (rescored 1909) Violin concerto in G (solo part & score)
- 1900 3 Fantasy pieces for cello & piano
- 1901 2 Bach Fugues arr. for String Quartet & String Trio (parts)
- 1901 Quintet in F min for 2 Vlns., Vla., Cello & Bass
- 1901 8 Lieder. Words by Heine
- 1901 Piano trio in B min
- 1901-2 Romantic piece for piano & violin in A min
- 1901-7 Concert piece in A min for violin & orchestra (full score)
- 1902 3 Fantasy Pieces for string quartet (published by Bote & Bock)
- 1902 Quintet in D for 2 Vlns., Vla., Cello & Bass (in one movt.)
- 1903-5 Duet in D for Violin & Cello (parts)
- 1904 4 songs. Words by Swinburne
- 1904 Clarinet quintet in E flat
- 1904-6 Scherzo for Piano quintet in Ab and E (simultaneously) (score)
- 1905 5 pieces for string quartet
- 1905 5 Canons for SATB voices & piano
- 1906 Cello quartet in C (score & parts)
- 1906 3 Shakespeare sonnets
- 1906 Duetlet in D for viola & cello
- 1906 Song "When day meets night"
- 1907 Duet in G for 2 violins with piano duet(4 hands)
- 1907 Grand Solo for viola in G, ("To Johnson. So difficult as to be absolutely impossible") for G.D.Miles
- 1907-8 Cello Concerto in D, Piano & Cello parts (Proms 1908 commission)
- 1909 3 pieces for violin & piano
- 1910 Violin sonata in Eb
- 1910 2 Piano quartets- in C & G
- 1911 3 Trios for 2 violins & viola
- 1912 4 Dances for 3 violins & piano
- 1912 5 Larnier songs for voice & piano
- 1914–16 4 Movements for 3 violins & piano
- 1915 arr.of Bach Brandenburg Concerto No.6 for 4 Vlns. & piano (1st movt. only)
- 1915 arr. of Vivaldi's Violin Concerto in B min, No.10 from L'estro Armonico, for 4 vlns. & piano
- 1916 Variations in A for 4 violins & piano
- 1916 2 Quartets in C & D for 3 violins & viola
- 1916 Cello Sonata in C
- 1917 Sextet in G min for 2 Vlns., 2 Vlas., Cello & Bass (Published by Stainer & Bell 1920)

Winner of Carnegie Trust Award (alongside Holst's "Hymn of Jesus" and Stanford 5th Symphony)

- 1917 Quintet in E min for Piano, Vln., Vla., Cello & Bass
- 1917 "Sunshine over the Avon" for solo piano. (parody of Schoenberg, written "whilst waiting for dinner")
- 1918 2 string quartets- in F & E flat
- 1918 "Erith suite for strings" (score & parts)
- 1918 Violin Sonata in A
- 1919 2 Songs "England & Flanders", "In Flanders fields"
- 1919 Quintet in D min for 2 Vlns., 2 Vlas., Cello & Bass (Unfinished)
- 1920 Piano Sonata in A
- 1920 4 Pieces for 2 violins & piano (In memoriam F W Hood)
- 1921 Song "My Shirt is a Token"

Miscellaneous items also held by W S Miles:

- Catalog(sic) of the Musical Compositions of Percy Hilder Miles Jan 1918– (updated to 1921 after death). Contains listings of approximately 180 works with dates and locations of composition.
- The letters (117) of Percy Hilder Miles from 1905 to 1921 written to his brother Maurice containing comments on his musical point of view about his compositions and music in general
- General letters (150 approx) written from Percy to his brothers and parents 1906-1920
- Percy Hilder Miles - Royal Academy of Music Harmony Examination results 1894, 1895, 1896.

Manuscripts presumed lost:

- 1886 "Autumn leaves" duets for 2 violins (first work listed in Catalog, composed aged 8)
- 1887 Introduction book for the violin
- 1887 "Jubilee" book of duets for 2 violins
- 1887 Overture "Hydaspes"
- 1887 Hymn tune "God will take care of you"
- 1887 "Jubilee" Overture
- 1887 Overture in G (without name)
- 1888 "Frederick William" Overture
- 1888? Coronation solo- Air with variations for Vln. & Piano
- 1888 "Franchelette" Overture
- 1889 Trio in G for 2 Vlns. & Cello
- 1890 Trio in D min for 2 Vlns. & Cello ("Wagner trio")
- 1890 Morceau de salon in G for violin & piano
- 1891 Duet in D for violin & cello
- 1891 Piece in F for violin & piano
- 1891 Duet in C for violin & cello
- 1891 Polonaise for violin & piano
- 1891 Anthem "Praise the Lord O my soul" Psalm CXLVI v1-3
- 1891 Pieces for violin alone
- 1891 Anthem "We took sweet counsel" Psalm LV v15-17
- 1891 Trio in Bb for 2 violins & cello
- 1891 Song "Dream singing"
- 1891 Trio in D for 2 violins & cello
- 1892 Exercises (studies) for violin
- 1892 Violin concerto in D
- 1892 Trio in G for 2 Violins & cello
- 1892 Meditation for cello & piano
- 1892 Oratorio- "Joseph"
- 1892 "Love's welcome" Partsong for SATB
- 1892 Piano trio in C
- 1892 Anthem "Awake up my glory" Psalm LVII v9-10
- 1892 Andante in F for cello & piano
- 1892 Trio Facile in G for 2 violins & cello
- 1892 Trio in F for 2 Violins & cello
- 1893 Trio in A for 2 Violins & cello
- 1893 Oratorio- "Noah"
- 1893 6 short pieces for Organ
- 1893 Song "Virtue"
- 1893 Song "Sing to me"
- 1893 Motet "The lily and the cross"
- 1893 Piano trio in F
- 1893 Prelude & Fugue in D min for Organ
- 1893 8 Canons for 2,3 & 4 voices & piano*1893 Ballade & Scherzo for violin & piano
- 1894 Deus Misereatur Psalm LVXVII for soli, chorus & orch. (unfinished)
- 1894 Piano sonata in C min (one movt.)
- 1895 Piano quartet in D (one movt.)
- 1895 2 Children's pieces in A & G for violin & piano
- 1895 Cadenza for Brahms' Violin concerto
- 1895 5 songs for voice & piano (all but 1st lost)
- 1895 6 songs for voice & piano
- 1895 3 duets for voice & piano (only 2nd and 3rd lost)
- 1895 Scherzo in G for string quartet
- 1895 Sonatina in C for piano
- 1896 Variations in F for piano (unfinished)
- 1897 Song "By the stream that the willow is weeping above" words by Harold Miles Silvanus
- 1898 Dance in E min for violin & piano
- 1899 Romance in A for cello & piano
- 1900 Song "Stay my charmer, can you leave me?" words by Robert Burns
- 1900 Song "I looked and saw your eyes"
- 1901 Hungarian Song "As utoso viragok" words by Petofi
- 1914–15 5 Pieces for violin & piano (Only No.s 4&5 lost)
- 1914–15 arr. of Bach Brandenburg Concertos No.s 1,2,4 for 3 vlns. & piano

Works mentioned in Musical Times reviews:

- Piano Trio in C minor 1896
- Fantasia in D for violin and orchestra (performed 1898)
- Septet 1898
- String Quartet in D 1899
- 3 Fantasies for strings – performed at the Royal College of Music 6 December 1904
- An Andante and Allegro for piano quintet. Won silver medal in a competition in 1905.

Several of Miles' works are available at IMSLP as scores with parts, and as recordings.
