= Arnold Rosé =

Romanian-born Austrian violinist (1863–1946)

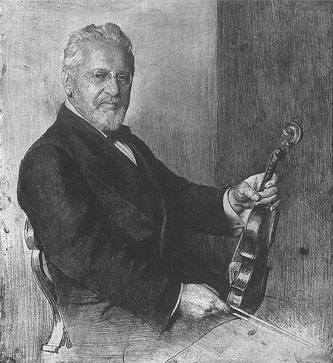
- Engraving of Rosé by Ferdinand Schmutzer, 1922
- Born: Arnold Josef Rosenblum; October 24, 1863; Jassy, United Principalities of Moldavia and Wallachia (now Iaşi, Romania)
- Died: August 25, 1946 (aged 82); London, United Kingdom
- Education: University of Music and Performing Arts Vienna
- Occupation: Violinist
- Years active: 1879-1945
- Spouse: Justine Mahler (m. 1902-1938)
- Children: 2, including Alfred and Alma
- Family: Gustav Mahler (brother in-law); Alma Mahler (sister in-law)

Arnold Josef Rosé (born Rosenblum; 24 October 1863 – 25 August 1946) was a Romanian-born Austrian Jewish violinist. He was leader (concertmaster) of the Vienna Philharmonic for over half a century. He worked closely with Johannes Brahms and Gustav Mahler. Mahler was his brother-in-law. Although not known internationally as a soloist he was a great orchestral leader (concertmaster) and player of chamber music. He was leading the Rosé Quartet for several decades.

== Early life ==
Arnold Rosé was born in Jassy, United Principalities of Moldavia and Wallachia (now Iași in Romania). As he and his three brothers showed musical potential then the family moved to Vienna, where his father established a thriving business as a carriage builder. Arnold began his musical studies at the age of seven, and at ten he entered the first class in violin at the Vienna Conservatory, receiving instruction from Carl Heissler.

== Career in Vienna ==
He made his first appearance in 1879 at a Leipzig Gewandhaus concert, and on 10 April 1881, he appeared with the Vienna Philharmonic in the first Viennese performance of Karl Goldmark's violin concerto under Hans Richter. Shortly thereafter he was engaged as a solo violinist and leader of the orchestra at the Vienna Court Opera (later the Staatsoper). This orchestra, in unique Viennese tradition, played both in the orchestra pit and on the concert platform, and later became known as the Vienna Philharmonic. He remained the leader of these two institutions until the 1930s. His reputation as an orchestral leader became legendary. For Sir Adrian Boult, he was quite simply “Europe’s greatest orchestral leader of his time”. In May 1936, he conducted the Vienna Philharmonic's performance of Beethoven's The Ruins of Athens overture as the filler side of the three-sided recording of the Leonore Overture No. 3 conducted by Bruno Walter and released on HMV/Gramophone/Gramola/Victor 78s.

In 1882 he founded the Rosé Quartet, regarded as the finest string quartet of its time. The other members were Hummer (2nd violin), Sigismund Bachrich (viola) and Lohse (cello).

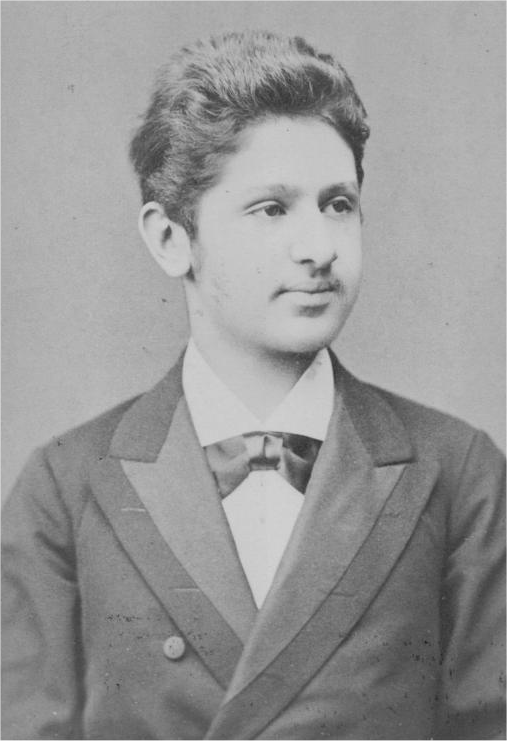
Arnold Rosé in 1887

From 1893 to 1901 Rosé taught at the Vienna Conservatory; he rejoined the faculty in 1908 and stayed until 1924. In 1888 Rosé made successful tours through Romania and Germany, and in 1889 was appointed concertmaster at the Bayreuth Festivals. The story is told that during a performance of Wagner’s Die Walküre, the orchestra was losing its way and on the verge of breaking down. Rosé stood up and gave a confident lead, bringing the orchestra back together and in tempo. Gustav Mahler, who was in the audience, is said to have exclaimed: “Now there is a concertmaster!” Both Arnold and his brother Eduard, the cellist, were to marry sisters of Mahler.

Mahler moved from Hamburg to Vienna in 1897 to become director of the Vienna Court Opera (later Vienna State Opera). His sisters Justine and Emma joined him in Vienna a year later. Eduard married Emma that very same month. Justine continued to live with her brother Gustav, keeping house for him. It was not long before a romantic attachment formed between her and Arnold. But it was kept a secret, Justine being unwilling to marry until her brother had found himself a wife. This happened when Gustav married Alma Schindler on 9 March 1902, and Arnold and Justine were married the next day.

== Persecution and exile ==
The Rosé family lived in comfortable circumstances. Emperor Franz Josef had guaranteed “freedom of religion and conscience” in 1867, but the reality was often different. They had two children, Alfred (1902–1975), who became a pianist and conductor; and Alma (1906–1944), a successful violinist and orchestra leader, who in July 1943 was deported to Auschwitz-Birkenau and was murdered there.

Justine Rosé died on 22 August 1938. Arnold was devastated by her death. Unable to continue living under Nazi occupation, he left Vienna four weeks later and travelled via the Netherlands to London, where he spent the last six years of his life. He continued to play chamber music with Friedrich Buxbaum and other colleagues. His last appearances were in 1945, so his career stretched over 65 years. After he learned of Alma's death at Birkenau, he found it difficult to continue with his work. He published editions of the violin sonatas of Bach and Beethoven and of Beethoven's six early Quartets, Op 18.

In January 1946, the Vienna Philharmonic "wished to reinstate" Rosé as concertmaster but he refused, saying in February that "56 Nazis remained in the Vienna Philharmonic" – an estimate his son believed to be far too high, but now known to be close to the actual number of 50 (60 had been members during World War II, and after the Allied victory, the orchestra expelled 10 members for their Nazi activities).

Arnold Rosé died in his sleep in London on 25 August 1946 of heart failure at age 82.
