= Rosé Quartet =

Austrian string quartet

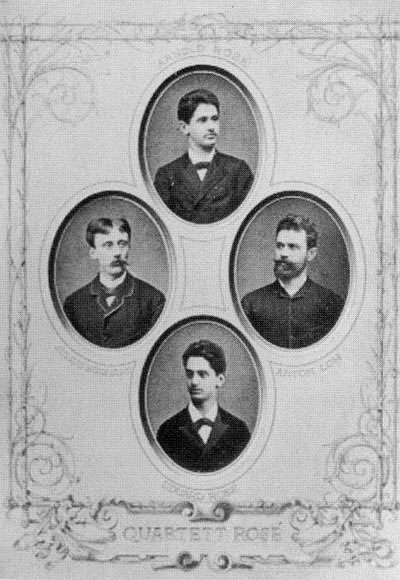
Founding members of Rosé Quartet in 1882: Arnold Rosé (top), Julius Egghard Jr. (left), Anton Loh (right), Eduard Rosé (bottom)

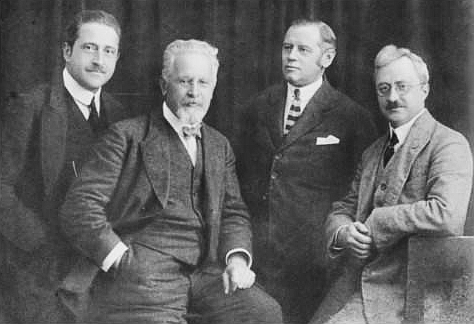
The Rosé Quartet in the 1920s: Paul Fischer, Arnold Rosé, Anton Rusitzka, Anton Walter. Arnold Rosé is second from left.

The Rosé Quartet was a string quartet formed by Arnold Rosé in 1882.

It was active for 55 years, until 1939.

== Members ==
Its members changed over time.

Rosé was first violin throughout. Julius Egghard Jr. played the second violin at first; then it was Albert Bachrich, until 1905 when Paul Fischer joined. Violist was initially Anton Loh, then Hugo von Steiner until 1901 when Anton Ruzitska came on; after 1930, Max Handl played the viola (there are frequent references to Handl joining the quartet in 1920, but concert programs throughout the 1920s show Ruzitska was the violist). Eduard Rosé, Arnold’s brother, had been a founding member of the ensemble playing the cello, but left after one season to get married and was replaced by Reinhold Hummer, who was in turn replaced by Friedrich Buxbaum; cellist Anton Walter joined in 1921, but later on Buxbaum rejoined.

The group's peak period was between 1905 and 1920, with Rosé, Fischer, Ruzitska, and Buxbaum.

== Repertoire ==
The quartet's repertoire was based around the works of Haydn, Mozart and Beethoven, but many contemporary composers also benefited from the quartet's support, including Arnold Schoenberg.

== Associations ==
The group participated in the Vienna premieres of works by Brahms, including his Clarinet Quintet and his Quintet in G major Opus 111. It also premiered Schoenberg's first and second string quartets and participated in the premiere of Verklärte Nacht along with two members of the Vienna Philharmonic Orchestra: Franz Jelinek, viola, and Franz Schmidt, violoncello. Among the quartet's performing collaborators were Julius Röntgen, Johannes Brahms, Franz Steiner, Bruno Walter, and Richard Mühlfeld. The quartet also made recordings.

== References in popular culture ==
- Baroness Lemburg in The White Liars by Peter Shaffer claims that her father played with "The Rosé String Quartet" and knew them intimately.
