= Joseph Hellmesberger Jr. =

Austrian musician (1855–1907)

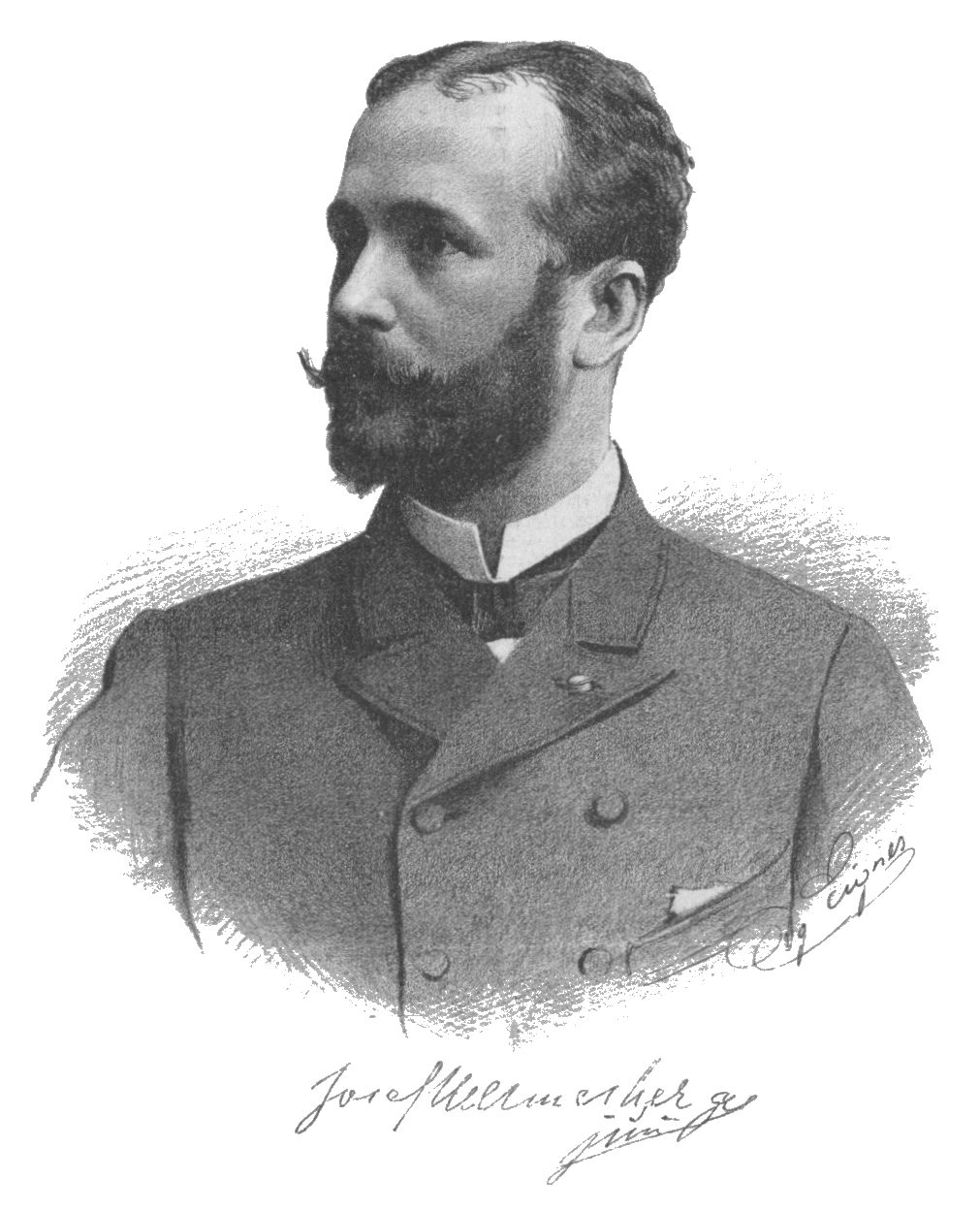
Joseph Hellmesberger Jr., lithograph by Ignaz Eigner, 1887

Joseph Heinrich Georg Hellmesberger Jr. (9 April 1855 – 26 April 1907), also known as Pepi Hellmesberger, was an Austrian composer, violinist and conductor.

== Biography ==
Hellmesberger was born in Vienna and was the son of violinist and conductor Joseph Hellmesberger Sr. (1828–1893), who was his first teacher. Among his family of notable musicians were: grandfather, Georg Hellmesberger Sr. (1800–1873); uncle, Georg Hellmesberger Jr. (1830–1852); and brother, Ferdinand Hellmesberger (1863–1940).

In 1875 Hellmesberger became a member of his father's Hellmesberger Quartet, while in 1891 he became leader. In 1878 Hellmesberger became solo violinist of the Vienna Court Chapel and professor at the Vienna Conservatory. In 1890 he was the first hofkapellmeister at the Vienna Court Opera, and from 1901 to 1903 he was principal conductor of the Vienna Philharmonic.

In 1904 and 1905 he was Kapellmeister at the Stuttgarter Hoftheater

His compositions include 22 operettas, 6 ballets, dance music and lieder.

Hellmesberger died of kidney failure, in Vienna at age 52.
