= Carl Schlesinger =

Carl (or Karl) Schlesinger (19 August 1813 – 18 January 1871) was an Austrian cellist. He was a founder member of the Hellmesberger Quartet, and a Professor at the Vienna Conservatory. He was awarded in 1854 the title of Imperial and Royal Chamber Virtuoso.

== Life ==
He was born in Vienna in 1813. His great-uncle Martin Schlesinger (1751–1818), a violinist, was from 1783 a member of the Tonkünstler-Societät in Vienna, and from 1793 a chamber musician of the Hungarian court chancellor Count József Erdődy, who was resident in Pressburg (now Bratislava), Vienna and Freistadtl (now Hlohovec)..

Carl received violin lessons from the age of nine, but aged twelve he turned to the cello. In 1837 he was a soloist in the Theater an der Wien in Vienna, and from 1838 to 1845 he was soloist in the National Theatre of Pesth; he returned to Vienna, where he was in the orchestra of the Court Opera Theatre

He was a member of the Hellmesberger Quartet from its formation in 1849, until 1855. From 1850 to 1868 he was solo cellist in the Vienna Philharmonic. From 1853, after the death of Joseph Merk, he was a Professor at the Vienna Conservatory. He was awarded in 1854 the title of Imperial and Royal Chamber Virtuoso. From 1858 he was a member of the Royal Court Chapel.

He died in Vienna in 1871, after several years suffering from a chest ailment.
