= Hellmesberger Quartet =

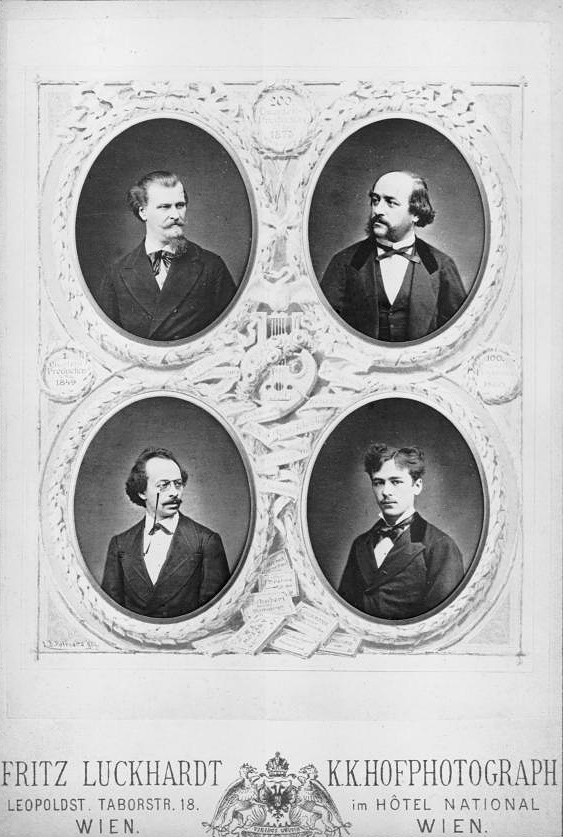
Hellmesberger-Quartett ca. 1872: Heinrich Röver, Joseph Hellmesberger Sr., Sigismund Bachrich, Joseph Hellmesberger Jr.

The Hellmesberger Quartet was a string quartet formed in Vienna in 1845. It was founded by Joseph Hellmesberger Sr. and was the first permanent named String Quartet.

== Composition ==
Violinist Leopold Jansa had started a string quartet in 1845. Hellmesberger took over from Jansa in 1849, retaining the other members. Its initial composition was:

- Joseph Hellmesberger Sr. (1st violin)
- Carl Heissler (2nd violin)
- Matthias Durst (viola)
- Carl Schlesinger (cello)

The quartet's composition remained "pretty constant until the mid-1860s".

At one point, the composition was:

- Joseph Hellmesberger, Sr. (1st violin)
- Adolph Brodsky (2nd violin), left Vienna in 1870
- Sigismund Bachrich (viola)
- David Popper (cello), from 1868 to 1870

Hellmesberger's son, Joseph Hellmesberger Jr., joined the quartet in 1870 to play the second violin and became leader in 1891.

Ferdinand Hellmesberger, the son of Joseph Sr. and brother of Joseph Jr., joined in 1883 to play the cello.

== Importance ==
The Quartet played an important role in Vienna's musical life through the performance of quartets from Ludwig van Beethoven, Johannes Brahms, and Franz Schubert, premiering several of Brahms' and Schubert's chamber works. This includes the first public performance of Schubert's C Major Quintet, D. 956 on 17 November 1850, twenty-two years after it was composed.

It commissioned and premiered Antonín Dvořák's String Quartet No. 11, Op. 61, composed in 1881.

The programme of the opening concert on November 4, 1849 included Joseph Haydn's Quartet in C, Op. 76, No. 3, Spohr's Piano Trio in A minor, Op. 124, and Beethoven's Quartet in F, Op. 59 No. 1.
