= Ferdinand Hellmesberger =

Austrian cellist and conductor (1863–1940)

Ferdinand Hellmesberger (24 January 1863 – 15 March 1940) was an Austrian cellist and conductor.

== Biography ==
He was born in Vienna to Joseph Hellmesberger, Sr. Joseph Hellmesberger, Jr. was his brother.

He studied at the Vienna Conservatory with Karl Udel (cello) and Anton Bruckner (music theory). He was a member of the Vienna Hofburgkapelle from 1879. From 1883 he became a member of the Hellmesberger Quartet.

In 1884, aged twenty-one, he became teacher at the Vienna Conservatory and in 1889 he became professor, which he remained until 1902.

He was later, in 1896, solo cellist at the court opera. In 1902 he became Kapellmeister at the Vienna Volksoper under Carl Rainer Simons. In 1905 he took on as ballet conductor at the Königlichen Oper of Berlin.

From 1910 and on he worked as Kurkapellmeister in Abbazia (now in Croatia), Baden bei Wien, Marienbad (now in Czech Republic), and Karlsbad (now in Czech Republic)

At the time of his death in Vienna, he was the last of a family that played an important role in the Vienna musical life.

Among his students at the Vienna Conservatory was Franz Schmidt.
