= Gesellschaft der Musikfreunde =

Society founded in 1812, Vienna

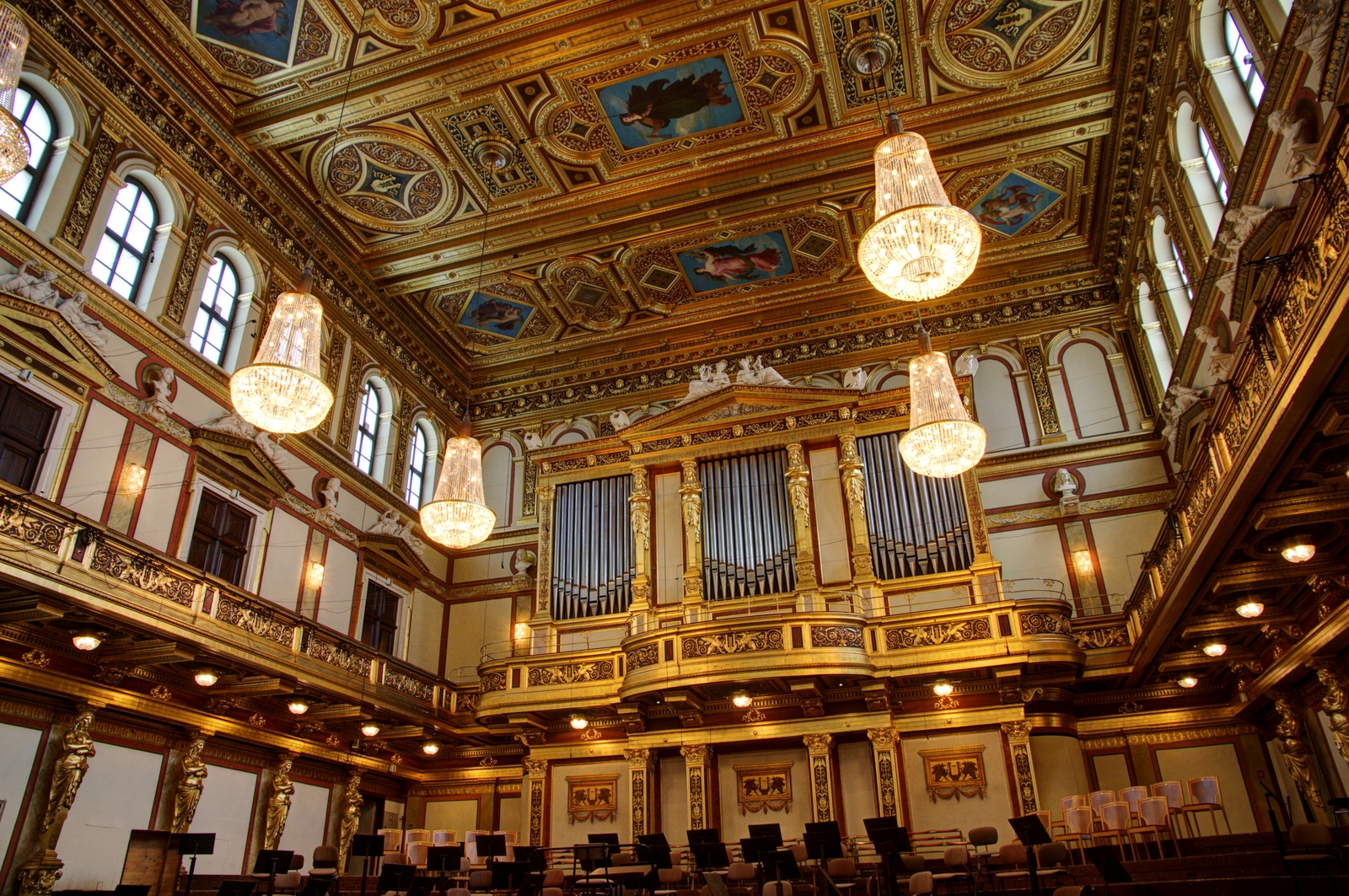
The Great Hall of the Musikverein

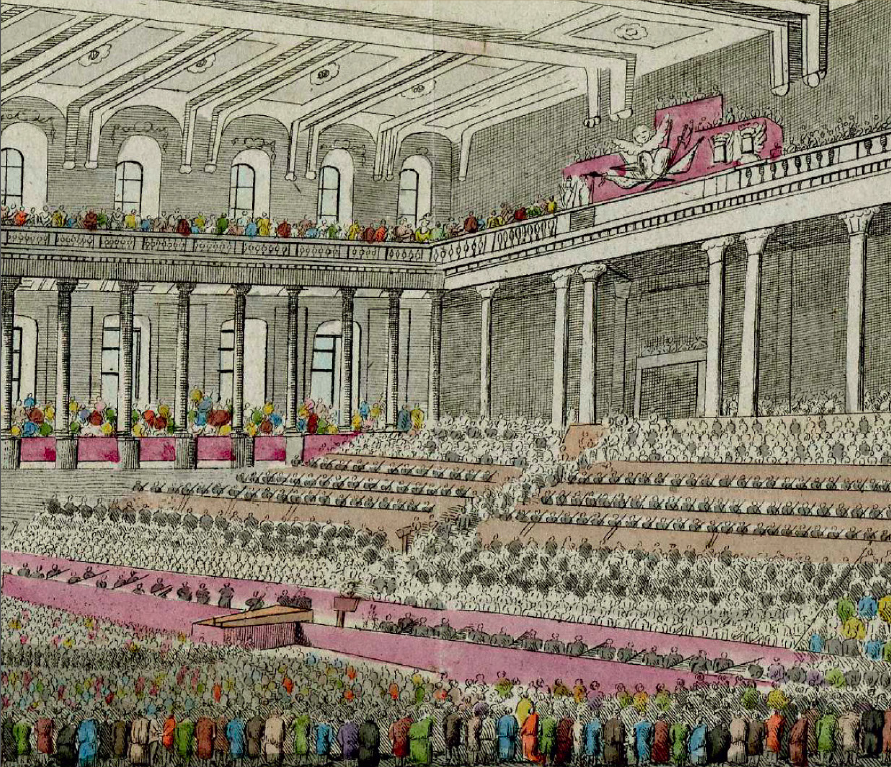
First concert in 1812, Alexander's Feast

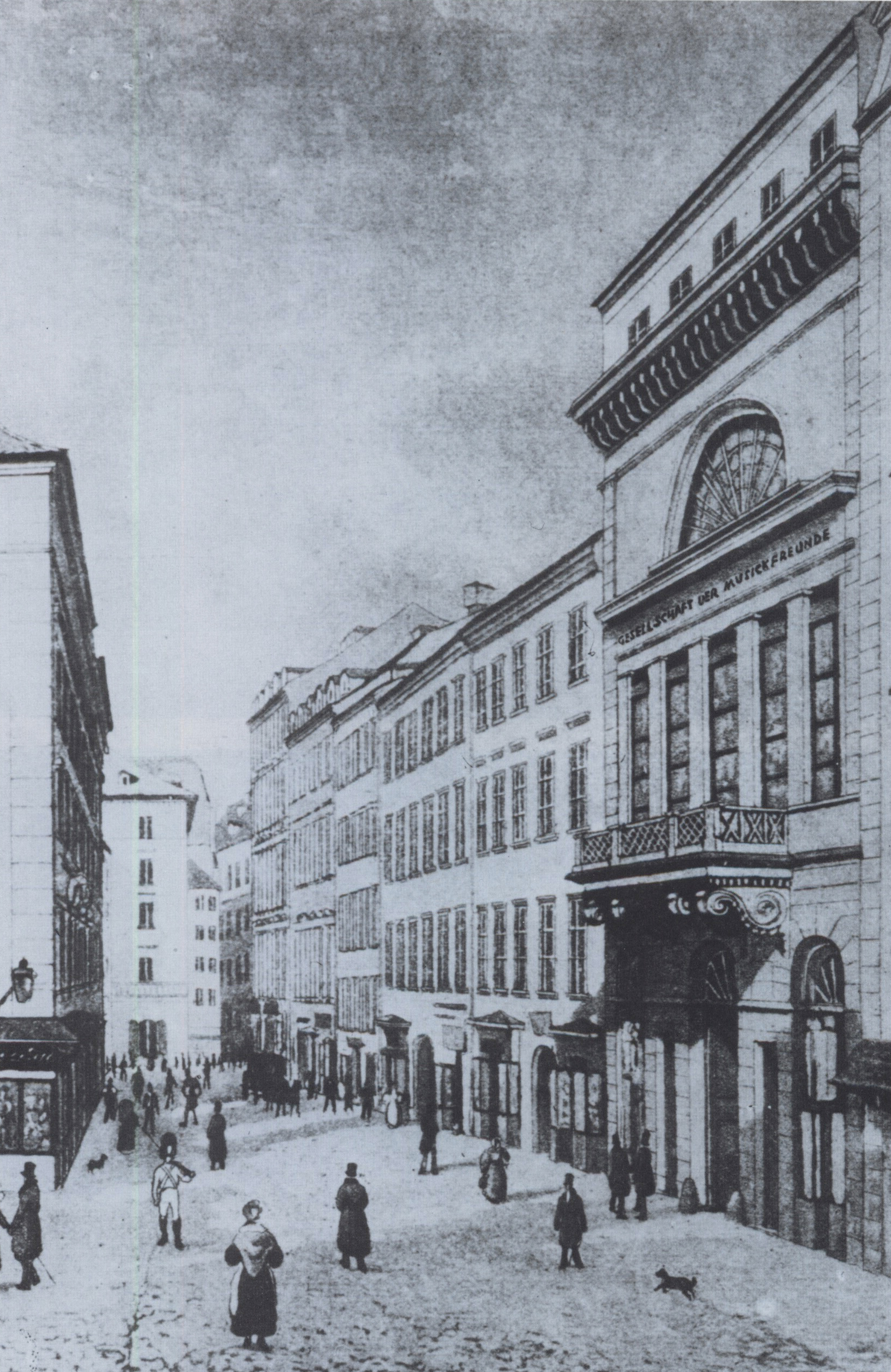
Musikverein building (1831–1870) on Tuchlauben street

The Gesellschaft der Musikfreunde in Wien (German for 'Society of Friends of Music in Vienna'), also known as the Wiener Musikverein (German for 'Viennese Music Association'), is an Austrian music organization that was founded in 1812 by Beethoven's friend Joseph Sonnleithner, general secretary of the Court Theatre in Vienna, Austria.

== Overview ==
Its official charter, drafted in 1814, stated that the purpose of the Gesellschaft was to promote music in all its facets. In early 1818, Franz Schubert was rejected for membership in the Gesellschaft as a professional musician, something that might have furthered his musical career.

The Gesellschaft accomplished its goals by sponsoring concerts, founding the Vienna Conservatory in 1819, founding the Wiener Singverein in 1858, constructing the Musikverein building in 1870, and by systematically collecting and archiving noteworthy music-history documents. It is now one of the world's leading music archives.

The first music director of the Gesellschaft was Carl Heissler, who was followed by Anton Rubinstein (appointed in 1871) and Johannes Brahms (appointed in 1872). Other notable music directors include Wilhelm Furtwängler, Herbert von Karajan and Gustav Mahler. Membership in the Gesellschaft has included a who's who of notable 19th- and 20th-century musical figures, including composers, conductors and instrumentalists.
