= Georg Hellmesberger Jr. =

Austrian musician

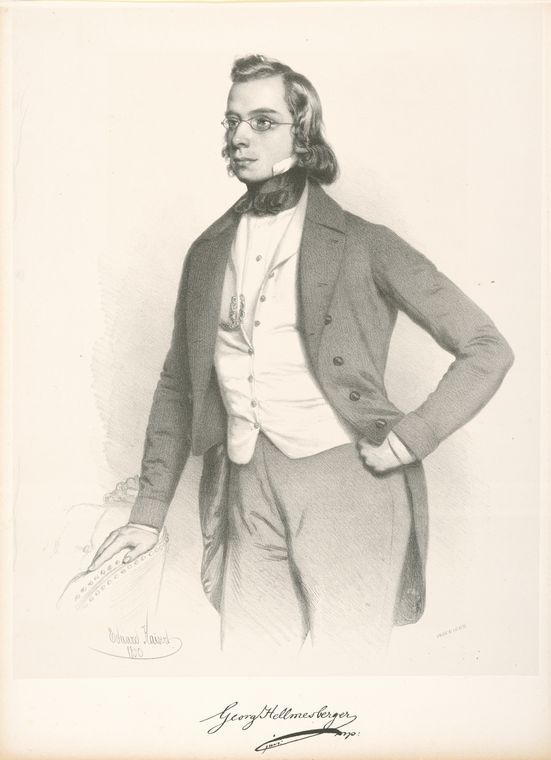
Georg Hellmesberger Jr.

Georg Hellmesberger Jr. (27 January 1830 – 12 November 1852) was an Austrian violinist and composer.

== Biography ==
Born in Vienna, he was the son of Georg Hellmesberger Sr. and the brother of Joseph Hellmesberger Sr. He studied violin with his father and composition with Ludwig Rotter (1810–1895).

In 1847 made a concert tour through Germany and England.

In 1850, he became court concertmaster and director of vaudeville and ballet music in Hanover. Shortly before his premature death in Hanover, he became Kapellmeister.

== Works ==
His works include operas (Die Bürgschaft, 1848 and Die beiden Königinnen, 1851) symphonies, chamber music, and solo pieces for violin.
