= Friedrich Buxbaum =

Austrian cellist

Friedrich Siegfried Buxbaum (23 September 1869, Vienna – 2 October 1948, London) was an Austrian cellist and long-serving member (and principal cello) of the Vienna Philharmonic and Vienna State Opera, and member of the Rosé Quartet.

His Jewish father Max Buxbaum was from Bohemia, and mother Rosa Wilharditz was a member of the IKG Wien.

Buxbaum studied at the Vienna Conservatory from 1883–87, under the tutelage of Ferdinand Hellmesberger He played briefly in the Glasgow Symphony Orchestra in Scotland, was active as a soloist and a member of the Fitzner Quartet from 1893-1900, and then, on 1 October 1900, was accepted as a member of the Vienna Philharmonic and Vienna State Opera, and also became a member of the Rosé Quartet. He later headed his own quartet. He was to participate in premieres of works by Johannes Brahms, Erich Wolfgang Korngold, Alexander Zemlinsky, Arnold Schoenberg and Anton Webern.

He was to serve as principal and solo cellist of the Vienna Philharmonic until 13 March 1938, when he and other Jewish members of the orchestra were dismissed. He and his family escaped Vienna for the UK in September 1938; he was granted permanent residency in December.

In October 1946, the Vienna Philharmonic invited him to return to his seat as cello principal, from which, its correspondence said, "you were unlawfully driven away a few years ago," asking Buxbaum, to "give us the opportunity to set right at least a small portion of the wrongs that were done to you." His response began, "Dear friends, you can probably imagine what a joy it was for me to read your friendly and honoring invitation…. To work with this orchestra as long as humanly possible is a tempting task indeed, although it would be easier for me to make a decision if I had knowledge of the factual conditions concerning my position…." Buxbaum, was never to return, but the orchestra awarded him its highest honor, the Nicolai Silver Medal in 1947 when it was touring in Edinburgh.
