= Georg Hellmesberger Sr. =

Austrian musician (1800–1873)

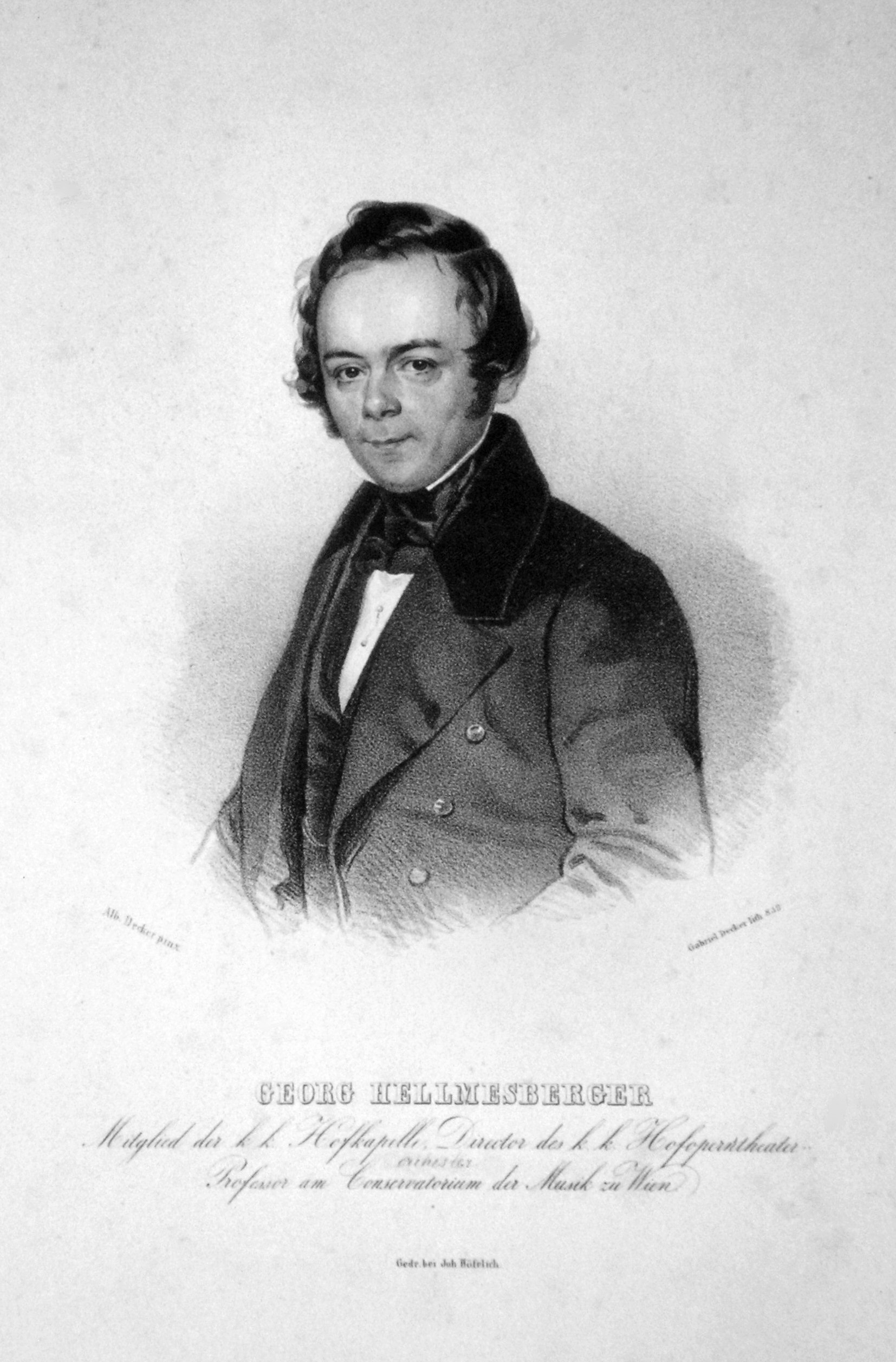
Georg Hellmesberger senior.

Georg Hellmesberger Sr. (24 April 1800 – 16 August 1873) was an Austrian violinist, conductor, and composer.

He was born in Vienna. His first music lesson was by his father. He went to school at the Cistercian Heiligenkreuz Abbey. He attended both philosophy courses in Vienna. He studied at the Vienna Conservatory under Joseph Böhm (violin) and Emanuel Förster (composition). In 1821 he became Böhm's assistant. He taught at the Conservatory from 1826. From 1833 to 1867 he was professor. Among his students were Joseph Joachim, Leopold Auer, and his two sons.

He was concertmaster of the Vienna Court Opera from 1830 after the death of Ignaz Schuppanzigh and a member of the court orchestra (Hofmusikkapelle). He was Kapellmeister of the Vienna Philharmonic Orchestra from 1842 until he became a pensioner at 1867.

He composed two violin concertos, string quartets, and variations for solo violin.

He was the father of Joseph Hellmesberger Sr. and Georg Hellmesberger Jr.
