= Joseph Hellmesberger Sr. =

Austrian violinist, conductor and composer

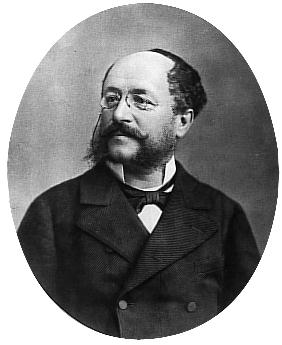

Joseph Hellmesberger Sr. (3 November 1828 – 24 October 1893) was an Austrian violinist, conductor, and composer.

Born in Vienna, he was the son of musician and pedagogue, Georg Hellmesberger Sr. (1800–1873), and was taught violin by his father at the Vienna Conservatory. Hellmesberger hails from a family of notable musicians including: brother, Georg Jr. (1830–1852); son, Joseph Jr. (1855–1907); and son Ferdinand (1863–1940).

In 1851, Hellmesberger became violin professor at the Vienna Conservatory, artistic director and conductor of the Gesellschaft der Musikfreunde concerts as well as director of the Vienna Conservatory. After the division of the two roles in 1859, he remained director of the Conservatory, while Johann Herbeck became conductor of the concerts. He was professor until 1877, but continued on as director until his death in Vienna.

In 1860 he became concertmaster of the Court Opera orchestra and took on various other positions in Vienna's music life.

Hellmesberger founded the Hellmesberger Quartet in 1849. Later his son, Joseph Jr., joined playing second violin. He surrendered leadership and the first chair to Joseph Jr. in 1887.
