= The Luck of the Navy =

The Luck of the Navy may refer to:

- The Luck of the Navy (play), a play by Mrs Clifford Mollison first staged in 1918
  - The Luck of the Navy (film), a 1927 British silent film
  - Luck of the Navy, a 1938 British film adaptation
