= Brian Aherne =

English actor (1902–1986)

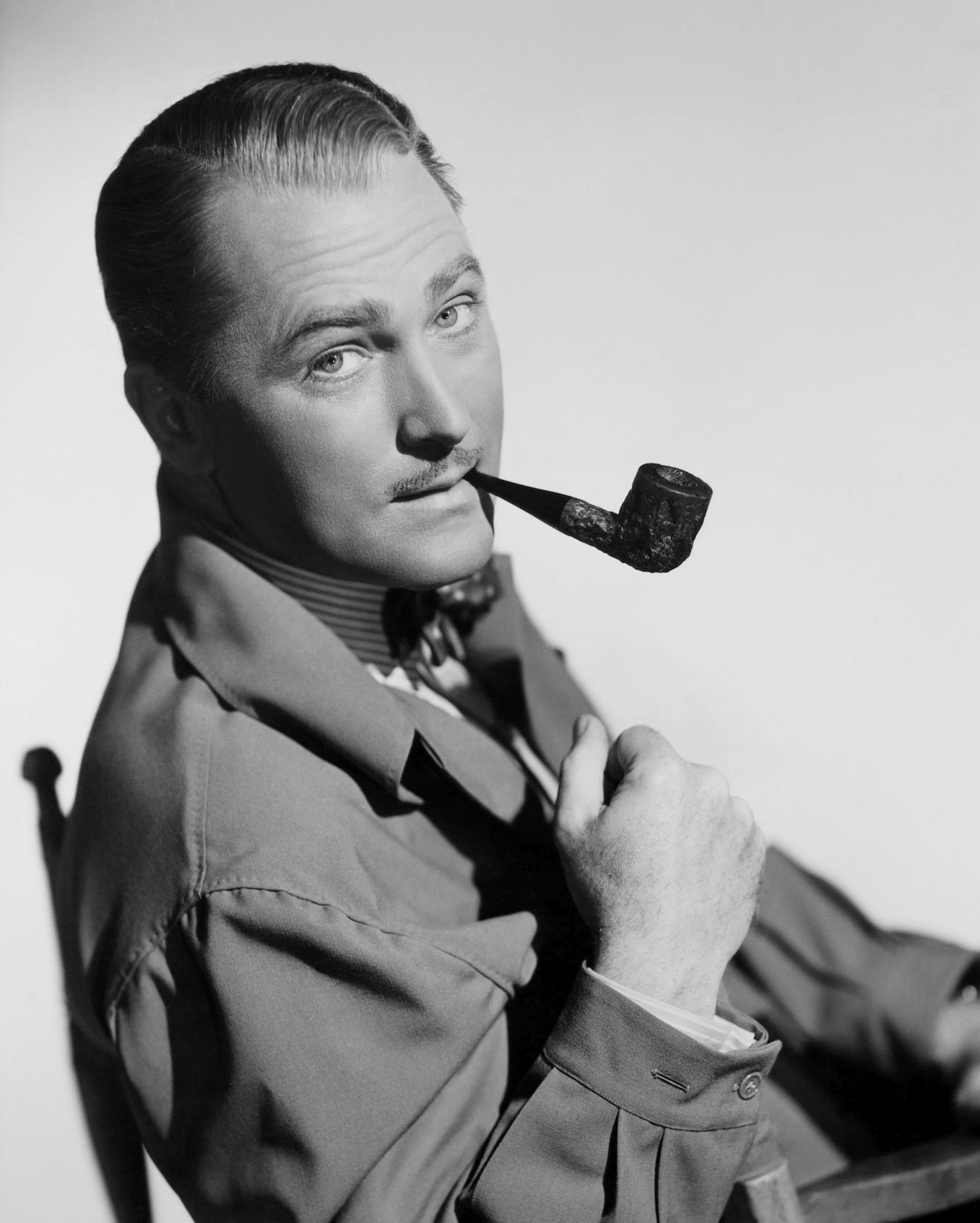
- Aherne (ca. 1942)
- Born: William Brian de Lacy Aherne; 2 May 1902; Kings Norton, England
- Died: 10 February 1986 (aged 83); Venice, Florida, U.S.
- Education: Italia Conti Academy of Theatre Arts
- Occupation: Actor
- Years active: 1910–1982
- Spouses: Joan Fontaine (m. 1939; div. 1945) Eleanor de Liagre Labrot (m. 1946)

William Brian de Lacy Aherne (2 May 1902 – 10 February 1986) was an English actor of stage, screen, radio and television, who enjoyed a long and varied career in Britain and the United States.

His first Broadway appearance in The Barretts of Wimpole Street in 1931 teamed him with Katharine Cornell, with whom he appeared in many productions. In films, he played opposite Madeleine Carroll, Joan Crawford, Bette Davis, Marlene Dietrich, Rita Hayworth, Constance Bennett and Carole Lombard, and was nominated for the Academy Award for Best Supporting Actor for his role as Emperor Maximilian in Juarez (1939). On TV, he appeared in The Twilight Zone episode, "The Trouble With Templeton", Wagon Train and Rawhide.

== Early life and career ==
=== Early life ===
He was born in King's Norton, Worcestershire, the second and younger son of the architect William de Lacy Aherne and his wife Louise (née Thomas). His elder brother Pat Aherne was also an actor.

Educated in Edgbaston, Birmingham, he received stage training at Italia Conti Academy in London as a child actor and then completed his education at Malvern College.

=== English stage ===
He first appeared on the stage in Birmingham with the Pilgrim Players (which developed into the Birmingham Repertory Theatre) on 5 April 1910 in Fifinella, and he made his first appearance on the London stage at the Garrick Theatre, 26 December 1913 in Where the Rainbow Ends, a play by Clifford Mills and John Ramsey, with music by Roger Quilter, which ran at various theatres for over 25 years.

He then studied with a view to becoming an architect, but, having had considerable amateur experience in Birmingham and with Liverpool's Green Room Club, he obtained an engagement under Robert Courtneidge, and appeared at London's Savoy Theatre, opening on 26 December 1923, as Jack O'Hara in a revival of Paddy the Next Best Thing, the play by W. Gayer-Mackay and Robert Ord (from the novel).

He then toured with Violet Vanbrugh as Hugo in The Flame and appeared at the London Playhouse in May 1924 as Langford in Leon Gordon's White Cargo, in which he played all through 1924–1925.

=== English films ===
Aherne's first screen appearance was in The Eleventh Commandment in 1924. He made several appearances in productions at Cricklewood Studios by Stoll Pictures, then the largest British film company, including two directed by Sinclair Hill: The Squire of Long Hadley (1925) and A Woman Redeemed (1927). He was also in King of the Castle (1925) and the comedy Safety First (1926).

In 1926. he accompanied Dion Boucicault Jr. to Australia, where he appeared in several plays by J.M. Barrie (as Valentine Brown in the comedy Quality Street, John Shand in the comedy What Every Woman Knows, Crichton in The Admirable Crichton, Simon and Harry in Mary Rose) and Willocks in Aren't We All?, another comedy by Frederick Lonsdale.

Aherne reappeared in London at the Strand in March 1927, again as Langford, in White Cargo and continued on the London stage in a succession of plays until late 1930 when he went to the U.S.

His latter silents were two films Shooting Stars and Underground by director Anthony Asquith. Aherne made his sound debut in The W Plan (1930), directed by Victor Saville. He appeared opposite Madeleine Carroll in Madame Guillotine (1931).

== U.S. career ==
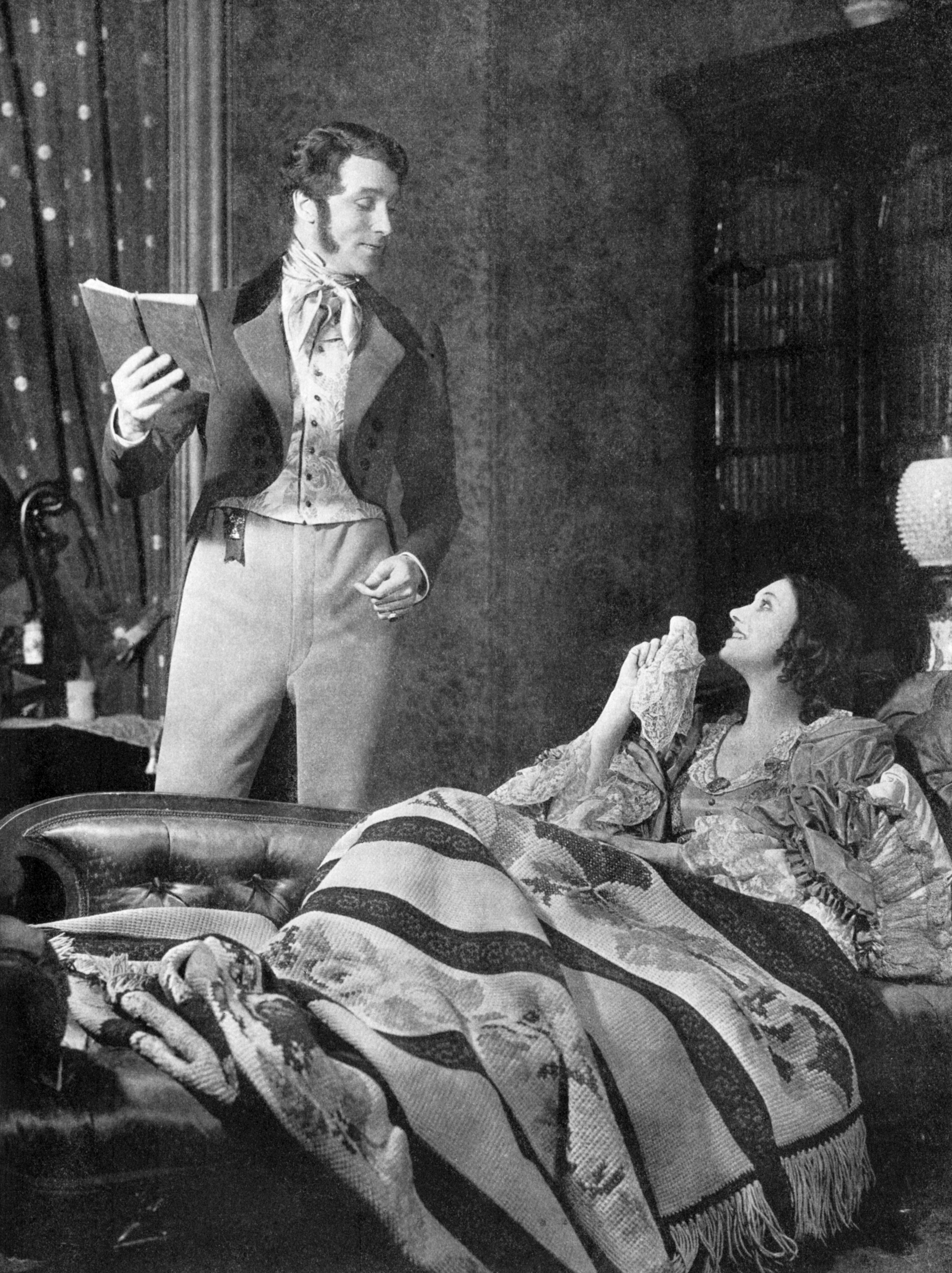
Aherne as Robert Browning and Katharine Cornell as Elizabeth in the original Broadway production of The Barretts of Wimpole Street (1931)

=== Broadway ===
Aherne made his first appearance on the New York City stage at the Empire Theatre on 9 February 1931, playing Robert Browning in Rudolf Besier's play The Barretts of Wimpole Street opposite Katharine Cornell. The play was a big success, running for 370 performances. Cornell and Aherne remained lifelong friends and he played in many of her productions.

Aherne returned to Broadway in 1932 for Lucrece, which starred Cornell. It only had a short run. He then went to Hollywood, where he made his American film debut in The Song of Songs (1933) with Marlene Dietrich.

He returned to England, where he starred in the film of Basil Dean's The Constant Nymph (1933).

In 1934, he was reunited with Cornell on Broadway in Romeo and Juliet, playing Mercutio; Cornell was Juliet, and Basil Rathbone was Romeo. It only ran 77 performances.

=== Hollywood ===
In Hollywood, Aherne supported Ann Harding in The Fountain (1934), released by RKO Pictures. At Metro-Goldwyn-Mayer, Aherne co-starred with Helen Hayes in What Every Woman Knows (1934), and Joan Crawford in I Live My Life (1935), which was a big hit. In 1935, Aherne and Cornell revived The Barretts of Wimpole Street on Broadway for 24 performances. Aherne returned to RKO for Sylvia Scarlett (1935) with Katharine Hepburn and Cary Grant, a notorious flop.

He returned to Broadway, where he appeared in Cornell's production of Saint Joan (1936), co-starring Maurice Evans. Back in Hollywood, he appeared in Beloved Enemy (1936) with Merle Oberon at Goldwyn Productions. Then, in 1937, he appeared as Iago on Broadway in Othello.

At Warner Bros., Aherne was top-billed in The Great Garrick (1937), directed by James Whale. He supported Constance Bennett in the hit comedy Merrily We Live (1938) for Hal Roach Studios, distributed by MGM. He was Oscar-nominated for his role as Emperor Maxmilian in Juarez (1939).

Hal Roach gave Aherne the star role in Captain Fury (1939) as a bushranger in colonial Australia. He supported Carole Lombard in Vigil in the Night (1940) at RKO, then reunited with Madeleine Carroll in My Son, My Son! (1940) for Edward Small.

=== Columbia ===
Aherne was billed over Rita Hayworth in The Lady in Question (1940) at Columbia. He made Hired Wife (1940) at Universal with Rosalind Russell; for this studio, he did The Man Who Lost Himself (1941) with Kay Francis.

MGM put Aherne in a supporting role in Smilin' Through (1941). He also had supporting roles in Skylark (1941) at Paramount and My Sister Eileen (1942) at Columbia. He stayed at this studio to star with Loretta Young in A Night to Remember (1942), and was he one of many stars in Forever and a Day (1943).

At Columbia, Aherne had a supporting role in First Comes Courage (1943) and in The Beautiful Cheat (1943).

In 1943, he quit films to become a flight instructor for the Royal Air Force at Falcon Field, Arizona. In November 1943, it was reported Columbia paid him $144,958 for the year, making him the second highest paid person at Columbia after Harry Cohn.

He fell ill with influenza while touring army camps in 1944.

=== Postwar ===
In 1945, he and Cornell returned to Broadway in a revival of The Barretts of Wimpole Street. He stayed in New York to appear in The French Touch (1945–1946), directed by René Clair.

Aherne returned to movies with RKO's The Locket (1946), billed after Laraine Day. He was top-billed in Smart Woman (1948), co-starring producer Constance Bennett. He did Drums Along the Amazon (1948) for Republic.

Aherne was in a Broadway revival of She Stoops to Conquer (1949-1950).

=== Television ===
Aherne made his television debut with "Dear Brutus" for The Ford Theatre Hour (1950), which he had performed on stage in Boston. He followed it with "The Magnificent Gesture" for Armstrong Circle Theatre (1950), "A Well-Remembered Voice" for Lux Video Theatre, "The Old Flame" for The Billy Rose Show (1951), "The Buccaneer" for Pulitzer Prize Playhouse (1951), and Betty Crocker Star Matinee (1952).

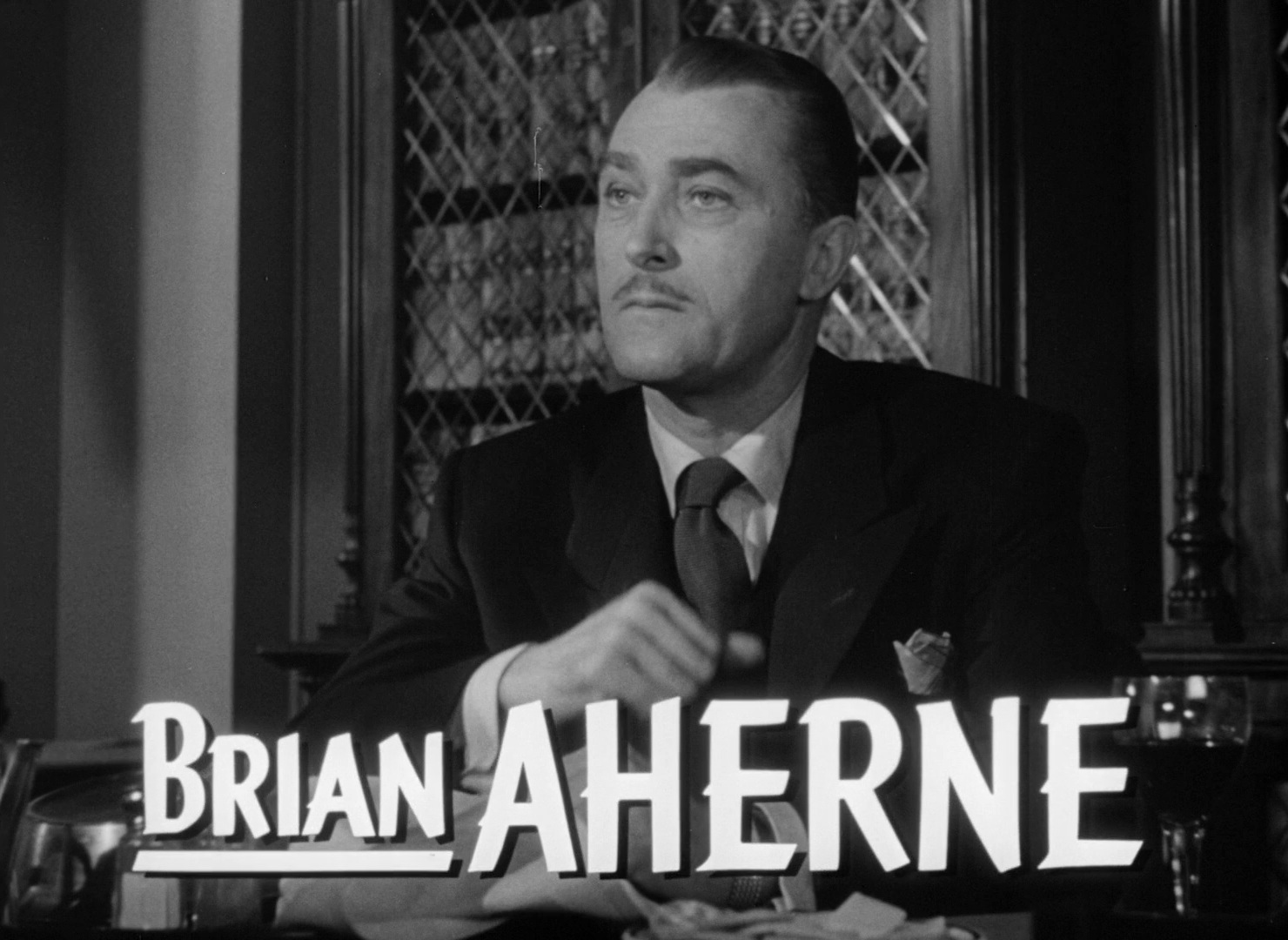
Aherne in the trailer for I Confess (1953)

He and Cornell reunited on stage in The Constant Wife (1951–1952). Then Aherne returned to Hollywood. He had supporting roles in I Confess (1953), directed by Alfred Hitchcock, and Titanic (1953) as Captain E.J. Smith.

Aherne did Escapade (1953) on Broadway and "Two for Tea" for Lux Video Theatre and "Element of Risk" and "Breakdown" for Robert Montgomery Presents (1953).

20th Century Fox asked Aherne back to Hollywood to play King Arthur in Prince Valiant (1954) and to play a supporting part in A Bullet Is Waiting (1954).

He did Quadrille (1954–1955) on Broadway with the Lunts, then "Now in Rehearsal" for the Eddie Cantor episode of The Colgate Comedy Hour (1955). Aherne did "The Martyr" for General Electric Theater (1955), "Reunion in Vienna" for Producers' Showcase (1955), and "The Round Dozen" and "Appearances and Reality" for The Star and the Story (1955).

Aherne went to MGM for The Swan (1956). On TV, he did "One Minute from Broadway" for Sneak Preview (1956), "Night Shriek" for Climax! (1956), "The Sacred Trust" and "The Lamp of Father Cataldo" for Crossroads (1956), "The Transfer" for The Errol Flynn Theatre (1956), "Safe Enough" for Studio 57 (1957), and "Story Without a Moral" for Goodyear Theatre (1959).

In 1957, he went on a national tour of My Fair Lady, playing Professor Henry Higgins. In 1960, he played the title role of "The Trouble with Templeton" on the television series The Twilight Zone.

Aherne was invited back to 20th Century Fox for a sizable supporting role in the big budget The Best of Everything (1959). Aherne's final Broadway appearance was in Dear Liar (1960) with Cornell, where he played George Bernard Shaw ("with great vivacity" according to The New York Times) opposite Cornell's Mrs Patrick Campbell. He acted in the movie Susan Slade (1961). He did "The Bruce Saybrook Story" on Wagon Train (1961), and "The Gentleman's Gentleman" on Rawhide (1961). He also appeared as guest host on the TV panel show The Name's the Same.

=== Final years ===
Aherne's final film roles included Lancelot and Guinevere (1963) as King Arthur, The Waltz King (1964) for Disney (as Johann Strauss I), and The Cavern (1964).

He settled in Switzerland. He appeared in a play in England and agreed to return to Hollywood to play Rosalind Russell's love interest in Rosie! (1967).

In 1970, he appeared as a mystery guest on What's My Line?.

=== Radio career ===
Aherne co-starred in the "Florence Nightingale" episode of Theatre Guild on the Air 13 April 1952. In 1945, he played sleuth Simon Templar in the mystery series The Saint. He also appeared in an episode of The Burns and Allen Show titled "Brian Aherne's Shorts" on March 28, 1944.

== Personal life and death ==
From 1939 to 1945, Aherne was married to actress Joan Fontaine; the marriage ended in divorce. He married Eleanor de Liagre Labrot (1910-2000) in 1946, and their union lasted until his death in 1986.

He published his autobiography A Proper Job in 1969 as well as A Dreadful Man (1979), a biography of his close friend George Sanders.

Aherne was a pilot and charter member of the Aircraft Owners and Pilots Association.

He died of heart failure in Venice, Florida at the age of 83 on 10 February 1986. He was cremated at Sarasota Crematory.

== Recognition ==
He was honored with a star on the Hollywood Walk of Fame at 1772 Vine Street.

== Filmography ==
Film
Year	Title	Role	Notes
1924	The Eleventh Commandment	Norman Barchester	
1925	The Squire of Long Hadley	Jim Luttrell	
1925	King of the Castle	Colin O'Farrell	
1926	Safety First	Hippocrates Rayne	
1927	A Woman Redeemed	Geoffrey Maynefleet	
1928	Shooting Stars	Julian Gordon	
1928	Underground	Bill	
1930	The W Plan	Colonel Duncan Grant	
1931	Madame Guillotine	Louis Dubois	
1933	The Song of Songs	Richard Waldow	
1933	The Constant Nymph	Lewis Dodd	
1934	The Fountain	Lewis Allison	
1934	What Every Woman Knows	John Shand	
1935	I Live My Life	Terence "Terry" O'Neill	
1935	Sylvia Scarlett	Michael Fane	
1936	Beloved Enemy	Dennis Riordan	
1937	The Great Garrick	David Garrick	
1938	Merrily We Live	E. Wade Rawlins	
1939	Juarez	Maximilian I of Mexico	nominated for Best Actor in a Supporting Role
1939	Captain Fury	Captain Michael Fury	
1940	Vigil in the Night	Dr. Robert S. Prescott	
1940	My Son, My Son!	William Essex	
1940	The Lady in Question	Andre Morestan	
1940	Hired Wife	Stephen Dexter	
1941	The Man Who Lost Himself	John Evans / Malcolm Scott	
1941	Smilin' Through	Sir John Carteret	
1941	Skylark	Jim Blake	
1942	My Sister Eileen	Robert Baker	
1942	A Night To Remember	Jeff Troy	
1943	Forever and a Day	Jim Trimble	
1943	First Comes Courage	Captain Allan Lowell	
1943	What a Woman!	Henry Pepper	
1946	The Locket	Dr. Harry Blair	
1948	Smart Woman	Robert Larrimore	
1948	Angel on the Amazon	Anthony Ridgeway	Alternative titles: Drums Along the Amazon; The Jungle Wilderness
1953	I Confess	Chief Prosecutor Willy Robertson	
1953	Titanic	Captain Edward John Smith	
1954	Prince Valiant	King Arthur	
1954	A Bullet Is Waiting	David Canham	
1956	The Swan	Father Carl Hyacinth	
1959	The Best of Everything	Fred Shalimar	
1961	Susan Slade	Stanton Corbett	
1963	Lancelot and Guinevere	King Arthur	Alternative title: Sword of Lancelot
1964	The Cavern	Gen. Braithwaite	
1967	Rosie!	Oliver Stevenson	(final film role)
Television
Year	Title	Role	Notes
1950	Armstrong Circle Theatre		
1950–1953	Robert Montgomery Presents	Phillip Armstrong	3 episodes
1951	Pulitzer Prize Playhouse		1 episode
1951–1953	Lux Video Theatre	Mr. Don/Reggie	2 episodes
1955	General Electric Theater	Colonel Tafferty	1 episode
1955	Producers' Showcase	Rudolf Maximilian	1 episode
1955–1956	Crossroads	Father Cataldo	3 episodes
1956	Climax!	David	1 episode
1956	Cavalcade of America	John Kirk	1 episode
1956	Sneak Preview		1 episode
1959	Goodyear Theatre	James Rupert/James Spencer	1 episode
1960	The Twilight Zone	Booth Templeton	1 episode
1961	Rawhide	Woolsey	1 episode
1961	Wagon Train	Lord Bruce Saybrook	1 episode
1963	The Wonderful World of Disney	Johann Strauss Sr.	2 episodes

== Awards and nominations ==
Year	Award	Category	Nominated work	Result
1940	12th Academy Awards	Best Supporting Actor	Juarez	Nominated
