= Chris McMaster =

British television producer (1925–1995)

- Born: Christopher McMaster; 3 November 1925; Marylebone, London, England
- Died: 1 November 1995 (aged 69); Lymington, Hampshire, England
- Occupations: producer, director and writer
- Years active: 1958-1981
- Spouse: Margaret Gotts (b.1956)
- Children: 3

Christopher McMaster (3 November 1925 – 1 November 1995) was a British television producer, director and writer. He is best known for his work at Southern Television, creating many popular children’s series such as Freewheelers, Rogue's Rock and Midnight is a Place.

== Early life and career ==
Chris McMaster was born in Marylebone, London on 3 November 1925 to actor manager Anew McMaster and theatrical impresario Micheál Mac Liammóir. He spent his early career as an actor in Ireland, Britain and Australia. In 1956 McMaster enrolled in a BBC training course where he first started directing with the 1958 series Starr and Company along with other BBC shows such as Saturday Playhouse before moving to Granada Television.

=== Career at Granada Television and Rediffusion London ===
At Granada, McMaster directed series such as Skyport, Biggles, Knight Errant Limited and most notably, 87 episodes of Coronation Street between 1962–1966. In 1965 while at Granada, McMaster wrote the sci-fi serial Object Z for Rediffusion London. Originally intended for an adult audience, producer Daphne Shadwell persuaded McMaster to adapt it for a 5.25pm Tuesday time slot. This serial offered a grand scale plot that would distinguish McMaster’s longest running series. A sequel, Object Z Returns aired in 1966.

== Career at Southern Television ==
In 1967, McMaster became head of children’s programming at Southern Television and on January 19, despite still working for Granada, circulated a two-page memo, outlining his thoughts on the direction the station should take in children’s television. This would lead to the creation of his longest running show, the children’s spy series Freewheelers.

What do children want to see? It seems clear that they like series which extend their imagination, either in space or time. They dislike being played down to. They like big events, spies, science fiction and, I’m afraid war stories. It goes almost without saying that they like plenty of action, preferably in the open air.

In this connection, it has struck me very much that the three most popular series with children are The Avengers, The Man from U.N.C.L.E. and Danger Man, in that order. The ideal drama series for children, then, should differ in no essential way from the equivalent adult drama series, except in the obvious sense of eliminating sex, sadism and unnecessary violence.

=== Freewheelers ===
After officially joining Southern on September 11, pre production began on Freewheelers and it premiered on April 4, 1968. The series was a success but it also constantly ran over budget, most notably in series 4 which was the first to be filmed in colour and overseas on the island of Majorca. By this time McMaster had wanted to end the show and had wrote to Southern Television director, Jack Hargreaves saying they should "get out whilst we are at the top." In its place he proposed a seven-part historical called The Kentish Lass but Southern did not want to end a profitable, albeit expensive show. By 1973, Southern had decided to end Freewheelers with series 8. Lewis Rudd the new assistant controller of programmes said "It was cancelled by mutual agreement, Chris McMaster was quiet happy to move onto new projects, which included Rogue's Rock." By series 8, Freewheelers had become too expensive for Southern to make and audiences had declined. At first McMaster lamented that Southern no longer wanted the series despite wanting to end it himself back in 1970 but in later years, said "We simply decided to stop, we could have gone on. We certainly had other stories ready to develop". McMaster kept a copy of series 2, episode 8, "Doomsday!" which for a long time was thought to be the only surviving episode of the first 5 series of Freewheelers until in 2000, it was discovered that film editor, Mike Womersley had kept duplicate masters of all 13 episodes of series 1 along with film inserts from all 8 series.

=== Other Southern Productions and end of career ===
In 1974, McMaster created the children’s comedy, Rogue's Rock that aired between 1974 and 1976. After this, he moved into period dramas for children with Midnight is a Place in 1977 which won a BAFTA nomination. In 1979 he returned to contemporary children’s drama with Park Ranger before returning to period dramas with his final two shows, The Ravelled Thread in 1979 and Scarf Jack in 1981. Chris McMaster’s career came to an end when Southern Television lost its South East franchise to Television South. Sound editor Keir Polyblank said on the impact to McMaster:

One day after losing the franchise he poured his heart out to me over lunch. TVS had brought in their own production controller – Anna Home – who decided that one of her first jobs should be getting rid of Chris. He put heart and soul into his work. It became his life and when there was no place for him it was the end of his world.

== Unrealised projects ==
McMaster had many projects he tried to convince programmers to make such as the period drama The Kentish Lass which he would have abandoned Freewheelers to make; Captain Silence, the adventures of a 19th century spy in war-torn Europe; Mac, a biopic on his father Anew McMaster; Mayday! a clone of Freewheelers developed with an unknown author; Damocles, which had the world held ransom by a giant space-borne laser; and Cruel Coppinger, based on the Cornish legend about a smuggler.

== Later life and death ==
After leaving TVS without making any programmes, McMaster became estranged from his wife and rented homes in Southampton while trying to revive his career with little success. He complained "All I’ve been offered is fucking Crossroads. I don’t want to do that after making series like Freewheelers and Rogue’s Rock. My place is making big series with major threats and grand-scale villains." By the 1990s McMaster was living in a spare room in Lymington. Former wardrobe mistress on Freewheelers, Ruth Sanders confirms. "I used to see Chris a lot when we were making The Ruth Rendell Mysteries in Romsey. He’d turn up often at the food van so we’d feed him because it was very sad to see him in that state and we realised he had problems." Chris McMaster died in 1995 from a short illness at the age of 69.

== Filmography ==
Year	Title	Company	Creator	Producer	Director	Writer	Notes
1958	Starr and Company	BBC			Yes		15 episodes
1959	Saturday Playhouse	BBC		Yes	Yes		episode 26, producer/episode 32, director
1959	Television Playwright	BBC		Yes			episode 29
1959	Sunday Night Theatre	BBC		Yes			series 10, episode 32
1959-1960	Skyport	Granada Television			Yes		5 episodes
1960	Biggles	Granada Television			Yes		16 episodes
1960-1961	Knight Errant Limited	Granada Television			Yes		8 episodes
1961	Family Solicitor	Granada Television			Yes		4 episodes
1962-1966	Coronation Street	Granada Television			Yes		87 episodes
1962-1963	The Verdict Is Yours	Granada Television			Yes		2 episodes
1965	Object Z	Rediffusion London	Yes			Yes	6 episodes
1966	Object Z Returns	Rediffusion London	Yes			Yes	6 episodes
1966	Play of the Week	Granada Television			Yes		series 12, episode 9
1968-1973	Freewheelers	Southern Television	Yes	Yes	Yes		104 episodes, producer/ 6 episodes, director
1974	Late Night Drama	Southern Television			Yes		episode 3
1974-1976	Rogue's Rock	Southern Television	Yes	Yes	Yes		27 episodes, producer/27 episodes, director
1977-1978	Midnight is a Place	Southern Television	Yes	Yes	Yes		13 episodes, producer/13 episodes, director
1979	Park Ranger	Southern Television	Yes	Yes		Yes	6 episodes, producer/ episode 5, writer
1979-1980	The Ravelled Thread	Southern Television	Yes	Yes	Yes		6 episodes, producer/6 episodes, director
1981	Scarf Jack	Southern Television	Yes	Yes	Yes		6 episodes, producer/6 episodes director

== Bibliography ==
- Harris, Mark (2019). Freewheelers – Calling White Knight. Handsworth Wood: Kaleidoscope Publishing. ISBN 978-1-900203-81-4.
