= Thomas Ford (composer) =

English composer (c1580-1648)

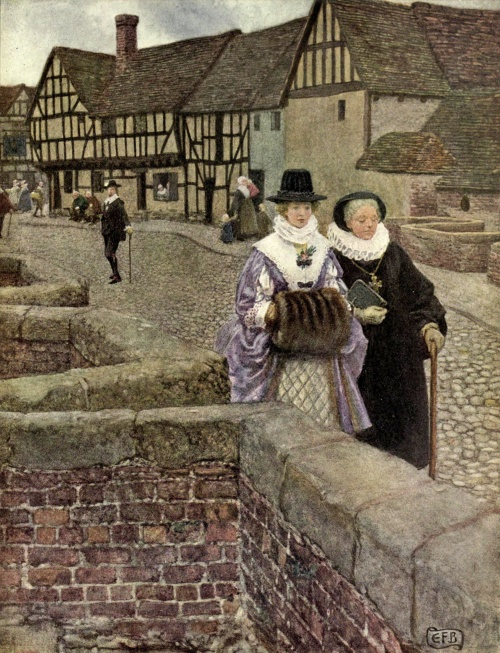
"I did but see her passing by, And yet I love her till I die". Illustration by Eleanor Fortescue-Brickdale

Thomas Ford (c. 1580 – buried 17 November 1648) was an English composer, lutenist, viol player and poet.

== Life ==
Ford was attached to the court of Henry Frederick, Prince of Wales, son of James I, who died in 1612. He was a musician to the household of Prince Henry from 1610 to 1612, a musician to the household of Prince Charles from 1617 to 1625, and a musician to Charles I from 1626 to 1642, the outbreak of the English Civil War. His will was made on 12 November 1648 and he was buried in St. Margaret's, Westminster on 17 November, but it is not known exactly when he died.

Ford wrote anthems, for three to six voices; four sacred canons; 35 partsongs; six fantasias for five parts; and a few other pieces for viols.

His most important collection was probably the Musicke of Sundrie Kindes (London, 1607), which was in two parts. The first book included lute ayres, described as "Aries for 4 voices to the Lute, Orphorion, or Basse-viol, with a Dialogue for two Voices..."; the second part contained dances such as "Pavens, Galiards, Almaines, Toies, Jigges, Thumpes, and such like..." scored for combinations of viols. Many of the ayres are given in two versions: one for voice or voices and lute, and another for four equal voices. An unusual feature of his music for viol is the "occasional use of a sound effect: a heavy pizzicato "thump...with the first and second finger of the "left hand according to the direction of the pricks." One of the songs from this collection, "Since first I saw your face", was set by Roger Quilter in 1942 for the Arnold Book of Old Songs. The collection also includes the celebrated song "There is a Lady sweet and Kind". Ford is also remembered for setting to music the poem, 'Yet if His Majesty Our Sovereign Lord'.

Some of his sacred music, found in two collections from 1614 and 1620, is unusual in including a basso continuo, a plainly Baroque feature which, though common on the continent by then, only made a belated appearance in England.

Together with John Dowland, Ford is a chief representative of the school which preceded Henry Lawes.
