= The Ash Grove =

Welsh folk song

"The Ash Grove"

"The Ash Grove" (Welsh: Llwyn Onn) is a traditional Welsh folk song; numerous sets of lyrics have been set to its melody. The best-known English lyrics were written by Thomas Oliphant in the 19th century.

== History ==
The first published version of the tune was in 1802 in The Bardic Museum, a book written by the harpist Edward Jones. About four years later a version with words appeared, under the name Llwyn Onn. It tells of a sailor's love for "Gwen of Llwyn". At the end of the song, Gwen dies, and in one version of the piece, the writer talks about him mourning and that she is lying "'neath the shades of the lonely ash grove". The tune might be much older, as a similar air appears in John Gay's 1728 The Beggar's Opera, in the song "Cease Your Funning". This was arranged by Beethoven in his Twelve Scottish Songs, WoO 156 No. 5. In 1922, the English folksong collector Frank Kidson claimed that Gay's air derives from the morris dance tune "Constant Billy", which is first known in Playford's Dancing Master (1665).

An English-language version of "The Ash Grove" was published in 1862, in Volume I of Welsh Melodies, with Welsh and English Poetry, compiled by the harpist John Thomas, with Welsh words by John Jones (Talhaiarn) and English words by Thomas Oliphant. The first verse of this version is incorporated into a different interpretation by the English dramatist and translator John Oxenford. John Jones (Talhaiarn) also wrote English lyrics for "The Ash Grove", 'All hail to thee, Cambria', which appeared with his Welsh lyrics in Owain Alaw's Gems of Welsh Melody in 1860: http://hdl.handle.net/10107/4796728

The tune of "The Ash Grove" was used for the Thanksgiving hymn "Let All Things Now Living", composed in 1939 by Katherine K. Davis. The popularity of this hymnal version led to the tune's being included on a number of Christmas albums up through the 1950s, such as Jan August's 1955 album Christmas Favorites (Mercury Records #MG 20160). It had, however, been in use as a hymn tune long before the 20th century under the title "The Master Hath Come" by Sarah Doudney (1871), updated since in a retelling of the nativity story by Robert Cullinan entitled "On This Night Most Holy" (1996).

Another hymn set to the tune of "The Ash Grove" is "Sent Forth by God's Blessing."

"The Ash Grove" was also used by Michael Forster in his setting of the Gloria for use in the Roman Catholic mass. It was published as "Sing glory to God" in Liturgical Hymns Old and New 1999 by Kevin Mayhew Ltd.

Roger Quilter's setting of the song was included in the Arnold Book of Old Songs, published in 1950, with new lyrics by Rodney Bennett.

Benjamin Britten's arrangement for voice and piano was published in his Folk Song Arrangements, Vol 1: The British Isles (1943)

Around 1962 a song called "The Irish Free State" was written to this tune.

Early in John Ford's film How Green Was My Valley, adapted from Richard Llewellyn's 1939 novel of the same name, "The Ash Grove" is sung in Welsh by a group of miners.

"The Ash Grove" featured in the 1980 BBC mini-series Pride and Prejudice. The tune is also featured in Black & White, a 2001 video game by Lionhead Studios; the lyrics are altered to accord with the game's plot.

Ed Pearl's Ash Grove folk music club at 8162 Melrose Avenue in Los Angeles was named after the song. The club opened in 1958 and closed in 1973. The Greenbriar Boys, Lightnin' Hopkins, Mississippi John Hurt, Doc Watson, Ry Cooder, and many others performed there.

The traditional bawdy song "The Mayor of Bayswater", also known as "The Hairs of her Dickey-dido", is also sung to the tune of "The Ash Grove".

== Oliphant lyrics ==
Down yonder green valley, where streamlets meander,
When twilight is fading I pensively rove,
Or at the bright noontide in solitude wander
Amid the dark shades of the lonely ash grove.
'Twas there, while the blackbird was cheerfully singing,
I first met my dear one, the joy of my heart!
Around us for gladness the bluebells were ringing,
Ah! then little thought I how soon we should part.

Still glows the bright sunshine o'er valley and mountain,
Still warbles the blackbird its note from the tree;
Still trembles the moonbeam on streamlet and fountain,
But what are the beauties of nature to me?
With sorrow, deep sorrow, my bosom is laden,
All day I go mourning in search of my love;
Ye echoes, oh, tell me, where is the sweet maiden?
"She sleeps, 'neath the green turf down by the ash grove."

== Oxenford lyrics ==
The ash grove, how graceful, how plainly 'tis speaking;
The lark through its branches is gazing on me,
When over its branches the sunlight is breaking,
A host of kind faces is gazing on me.
The friends of my childhood again are before me;
Each step wakes a memory as freely I roam.
With (soft) whispers laden the leaves rustle o'er me;
The ash grove, the ash grove alone (again) is my home.

Down yonder green valley where streamlets meander,
When twilight is fading I pensively rove,
Or at the bright noontide in solitude wander
Amid the dark shades of the lonely ash grove.
'Twas there while the blackbird was cheerfully singing
I first met that dear one, the joy of my heart.
Around us for gladness the bluebells were ringing,
But then little thought I how soon we should part.

My lips smile no more, my heart loses its lightness;
No dream of the future my spirit can cheer.
I only can brood on the past and its brightness;
The dear ones I long for again gather here.
From ev'ry dark nook they press forward to meet me;
I lift up my eyes to the broad leafy dome,
And others are there, looking downward to greet me;
The ash grove, the ash grove again is my home.

== April Margera lyrics ==
April Margera recalled an unusual, truncated version of this tune in 2026:

The ash grove, how graceful,
how plainly 'tis speaking
the harp through it playing
has language for me:

the friends of my childhood
again before me,
each step brings me to
the graceful ash tree.

== Sheet music gallery ==
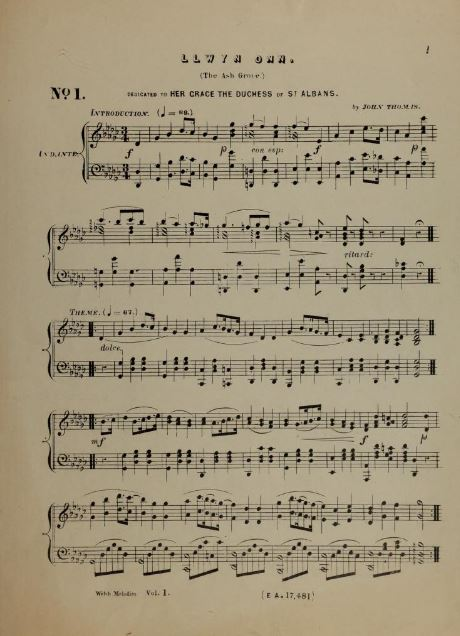
Page 1 of the musical composition Llwyn Onn ("The Ash Grove") by John Thomas

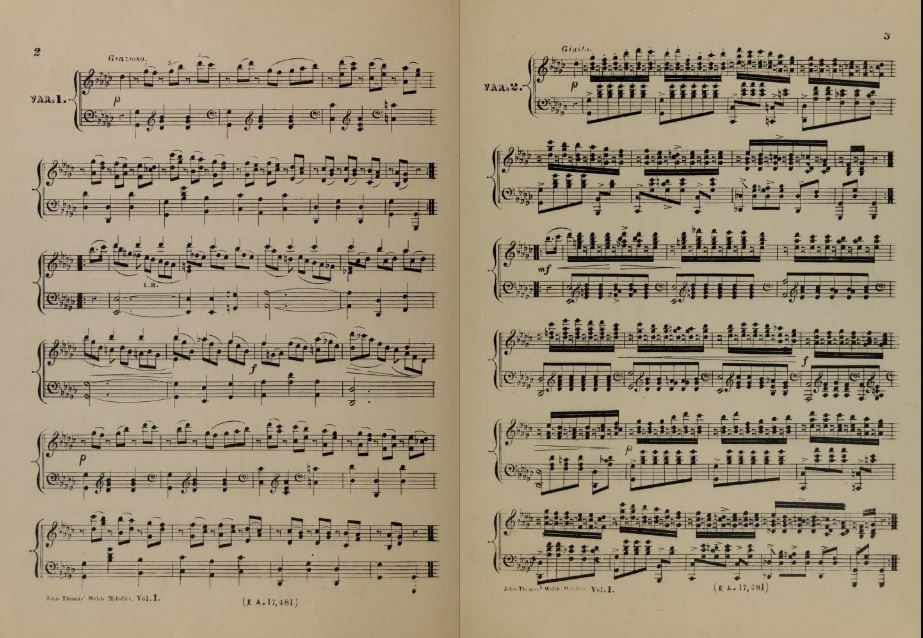
Pages 2–3 of the musical composition Llwyn Onn ("The Ash Grove") by John Thomas

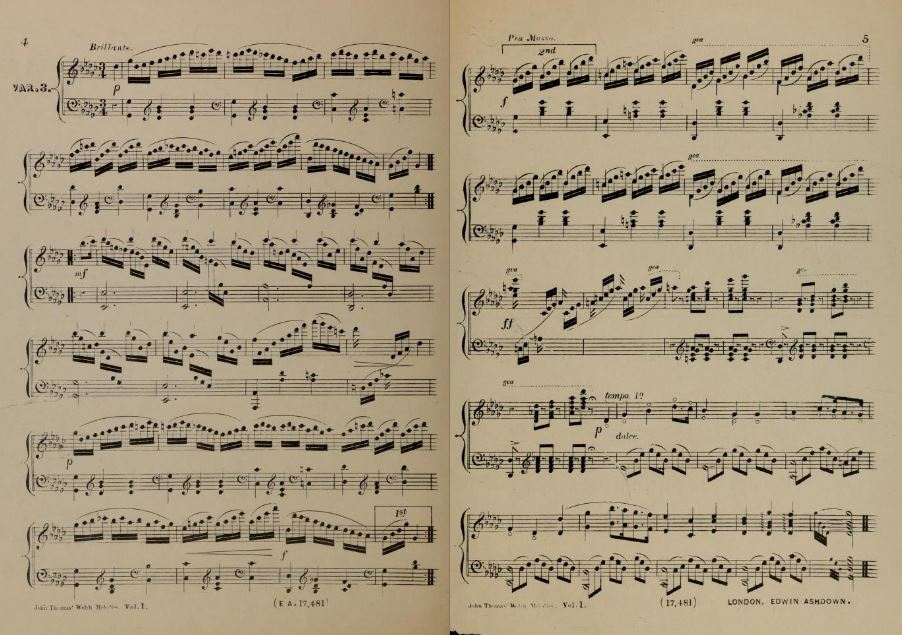
Pages 4–5 of the musical composition Llwyn Onn ("The Ash Grove") by John Thomas
