= Drink to Me Only with Thine Eyes =

Popular old song

"Drink to Me Only with Thine Eyes"
A 1916 recording by Reinald Werrenrath

"Drink to Me Only with Thine Eyes" is an English love song whose lyrics are the poem "To Celia" by the playwright Ben Jonson (1572–1637), first published in 1616. The precise origin of its melody is unknown.

== Lyrics ==
Drink to me only with thine eyes,
And I will pledge with mine;
Or leave a kiss within the cup,
And I'll not look for wine.
The thirst that from the soul doth rise
Doth ask a drink divine;
But might I of Jove's nectar sup,
I would not change for thine.

I sent thee late a rosy wreath,
Not so much honoring thee
As giving it a hope, that there
It could not withered be.
But thou thereon didst only breathe,
And sent'st it back to me;
Since when it grows, and smells, I swear,
Not of itself, but thee.

After this song had been popular for almost two centuries, scholars began to discern that its imagery and rhetoric were largely lifted from classical sources - particularly one of the erotic Epistles of Philostratus the Athenian (c. 170 – 250 AD). (Note: Epistle xxxiii) This borrowing is discussed by George Burke Johnston in his Poems of Ben Jonson (1960), in which he points out that "the poem is not a translation, but a synthesis of scattered passages. Although only one conceit is not borrowed from Philostratus, the piece is a unified poem, and its glory is Jonson's. It has remained alive and popular for over three hundred years, and it is safe to say that no other work by Jonson is so well known." He notes that while the authoritative proof of this borrowing was made by John Addington Symonds, in The Academy 16 (1884), a century earlier the dramatist Richard Cumberland had identified the link to "an obscure collection of love-letters" by Philostratus. The poet John F.M. Dovaston also discussed the borrowing in The Monthly Magazine. (Note: The Monthly Magazine (1815) page 123f)

Besides Philostratus, a couple of other classical precedents have also been identified. (Note: Other precedents include the Latin poet Catullus, and one of the poets of the Greek Anthology. J. Gwyn Griffiths has noted for instance that the image of perfume being imparted to a rosy wreath occurs in a poem of the Greek Anthology On the parallels with Catullus see Bruce Boehrer, "Ben Jonson and the 'Traditio Basiorum'.)

This literary background helps restore the original intention of the words from the blurring of certain lyrical variations which, while naïvely touching, do conceal the true meaning. In particular, the line "But might I of Jove's nectar sup" is often rendered: "But might I of love's nectar sip". The disappearance of Jove was probably not due to changing fashion, however, but to a popular misreading of the text of early editions. In Ben Jonson's time the initial J was just coming into use, and previously the standard would have been to use a capital I (as in classical Latin). Thus in the first edition of Ben Johnson's The Forest (1616), where the song first appeared in print, the line reads: "But might I of IOVE's Nectar sup". "IOVE" here indicates Jove, but this was misread as "love". The word "sup" has also often been changed to "sip"; but "sup" rhymes with "cup", and is clearly the reading in the first edition. The meaning of the line is that even if the poet could drink to his heart's content of the nectar (Note: Nectar and ambrosia were the food and drink of the Greek gods, conveying immortality.) of the king of the gods, he would prefer the nectar made by his earthly beloved.

== Melody ==
Willa McClung Evans suggested that Jonson's lyrics were fitted to a tune already in existence and that the fortunate marriage of words to music accounted in part for its excellence. This seems unlikely since Jonson's poem was set to an entirely different melody in 1756 by Elizabeth Turner. Another conception is that the original composition of the tune was by John Wall Callcott in about 1790 as a glee for two trebles and a bass. (Note: Best Loved Songs of the American People states (without evidence) that the tune is sometimes attributed to Mozart.) It was arranged as a song in the 19th century, apparently by Colonel Mellish (1777–1817). Later arrangements include those by Granville Bantock and Roger Quilter. Quilter's setting was included in the Arnold Book of Old Songs, published in 1950.

== References in media ==
The song is sung by Owl Jolson in 1936's Merrie Melodies I Love to Singa.
