= Reginald Owen =

British actor (1887–1972)

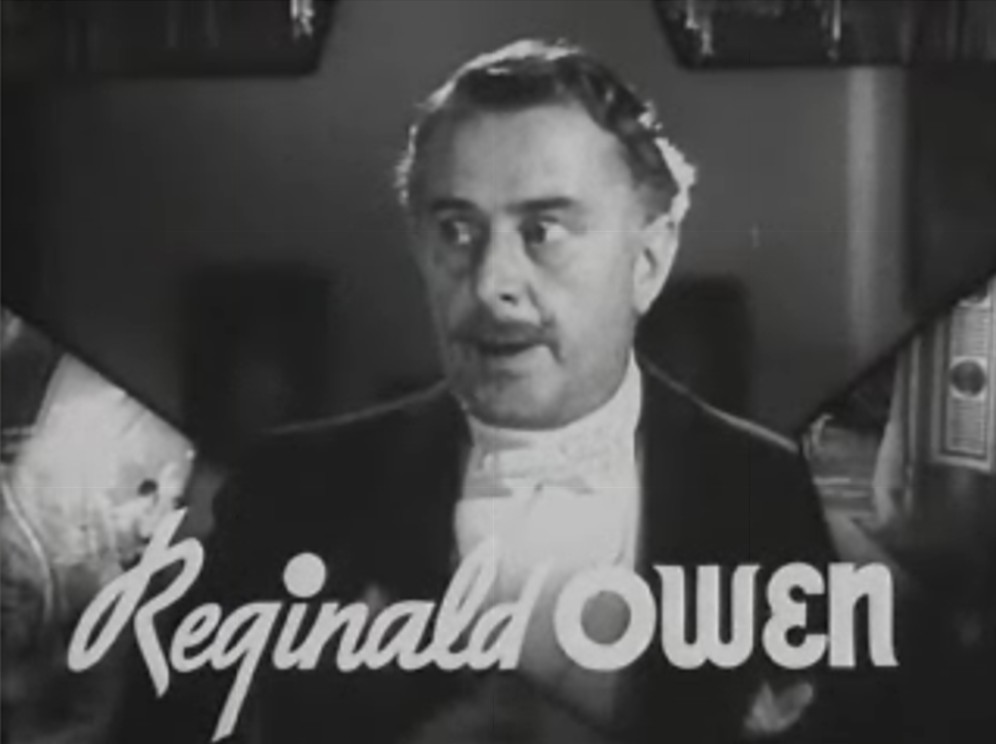
- Owen in the trailer for The Great Ziegfeld (1936)
- Born: John Reginald Owen; 5 August 1887; Wheathampstead, Hertfordshire, England
- Died: 5 November 1972 (aged 85); Boise, Idaho, US
- Resting place: Morris Hill Cemetery, Boise, Idaho, US
- Education: Royal Academy of Dramatic Art
- Occupation: Actor
- Years active: 1905–1972
- Spouse(s): Lydia Bilbrook (m. 1909; div. 1923) Billie Austin (m. 1934; died 1956) Barbara Haveman (m. 1956) (died 1998)
- Children: 2

John Reginald Owen (5 August 1887 – 5 November 1972) was a British actor, known for his many roles in British and American films and television programmes.

== Career ==
John Reginald Owen was born on 5 August 1887 in Wheathampstead, Hertfordshire, England, to Joseph and Frances Owen. He studied at the Royal Academy of Dramatic Art and made his professional debut in 1905.

Sometime prior to 1911 Owen met the author Mrs. Clifford Mills. On hearing her idea of a rainbow story, persuaded her to turn it into a play, which became Where the Rainbow Ends. He co-authored the work with Mills using the pseudonym John Ramsey.

He went to the United States in 1920 and performed on Broadway. He later moved to Hollywood, where he began a lengthy film career, becoming a familiar face in many Metro-Goldwyn-Mayer productions.

Owen is perhaps best known today for his performance as Ebenezer Scrooge in the 1938 film version of Charles Dickens' A Christmas Carol, a role he inherited from Lionel Barrymore, who had played the part on the radio for years.

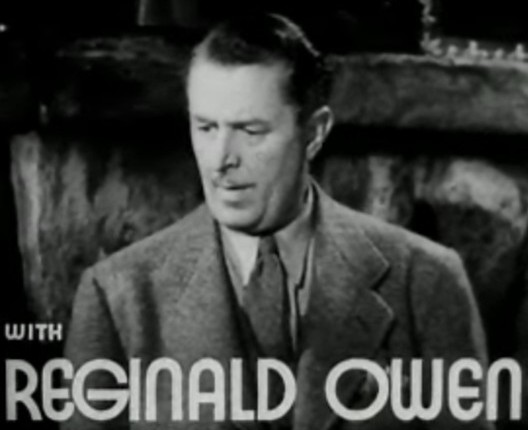
Owen in Petticoat Fever (1936)

Owen was one of a very few number of actors to play both Sherlock Holmes and his companion Dr. Watson, assaying Watson in the film Sherlock Holmes (1932) starring Clive Brook as Holmes, and then Holmes in A Study in Scarlet (1933) having co-written the screenplay.

Later in his career, Owen appeared with James Garner in the television series Maverick in the episodes "The Belcastle Brand" (1957) and "Gun-Shy" (1958) and guest starred in episodes of the series One Step Beyond, Kentucky Jones, and Bewitched. He was featured in the Walt Disney films Mary Poppins (1964) and Bedknobs and Broomsticks (1971). He had a small role in the 1962 Irwin Allen production of the Jules Verne novel Five Weeks in a Balloon. In August 1964, his mansion in Bel Air was rented to the Beatles, who were performing at the Hollywood Bowl, when no hotel would book them.

== Death ==
Owen died from a heart attack at age 85 in Boise, Idaho, and buried at the Morris Hill Cemetery there.

== Filmography ==
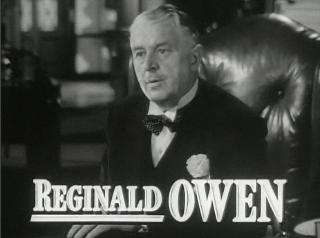
Owen The Miniver Story (1950)

- Henry VIII (1911) as Thomas Cromwell
- Sally in Our Alley (1916) as Harry
- A Place in the Sun (1916) as Stuart Capel
- Possession (1922) as Lord Wheatley
- The Grass Orphan (1922) as Heathcote St. John
- The Letter (1929) as Robert Crosbie
- The Man in Possession (1931) as Claude Dabney
- Platinum Blonde (1931) as Grayson
- Lovers Courageous (1932) as Jimmy
- A Woman Commands (1932) as The Prime Minister
- The Man Called Back (1932) as Dr. Atkins
- Downstairs (1932) as Baron 'Nicky' von Burgen
- Sherlock Holmes (1932) as Dr. Watson
- Robbers' Roost (1932) as Cecil Herrick
- A Study in Scarlet (1933) as Sherlock Holmes
- The Narrow Corner (1933) as Mr. Frith
- Double Harness (1933) as Freeman
- Voltaire (1933) as King Louis XV
- The Big Brain (1933) as Lord Darlington
- Queen Christina (1933) as Charles X Gustav of Sweden
- Nana (1934) as Bordenave
- Mandalay (1934) as Col. Thomas Dawson - Police Commissioner
- Fashions of 1934 (1934) as Oscar Baroque
- The House of Rothschild (1934) as Herries
- The Countess of Monte Cristo (1934) as The Baron
- Where Sinners Meet (1934) as Leonard
- Stingaree (1934) as The Governor-General
- Madame Du Barry (1934) as King Louis XV
- Of Human Bondage (1934) as Thorpe Athelny
- The Human Side (1934) as James Dalton
- Music in the Air (1934) as Ernst Weber
- Here Is My Heart (1934) as Prince Vladimir / Vova
- The Good Fairy (1935) as Detlaff, the Waiter
- Enchanted April (1935) as Henry Arbuthnot
- Escapade (1935) as Paul
- The Call of the Wild (1935) as Mr. Smith
- Anna Karenina (1935) as Stiva
- The Bishop Misbehaves (1935) as Guy Waller
- A Tale of Two Cities (1935) as Stryver
- Rose Marie (1936) as Myerson
- Petticoat Fever (1936) as Sir James Felton
- The Great Ziegfeld (1936) as Sampston
- Trouble for Two (1936) as President of Club
- Yours for the Asking (1936) as Dictionary McKinney
- The Girl on the Front Page (1936) as Archie Biddle
- Adventure in Manhattan (1936) as Blackton Gregory
- Love on the Run (1936) as Baron Otto Spanderman
- Dangerous Number (1937) as Cousin William
- Personal Property (1937) as Claude Dabney
- Madame X (1937) as Maurice Dourel
- The Bride Wore Red (1937) as Admiral Monti
- Conquest (1937) as Tallyrand
- Rosalie (1937) as Chancellor
- Everybody Sing (1938) as Hillary Bellaire
- Paradise for Three (1938) as Johann Kesselhut
- Kidnapped (1938) as Captain Hoseason
- Three Loves Has Nancy (1938) as William, the Butler
- Vacation from Love (1938) as John Hodge Lawson
- A Christmas Carol (1938) as Ebenezer Scrooge
- The Girl Downstairs (1938) as Charlie Grump
- Fast and Loose (1939) as Vincent Charlton
- Hotel Imperial (1939) as General Videnko
- Bridal Suite (1939) as Sir Horace Bragdon
- The Real Glory (1939) as Capt. Hartley
- Bad Little Angel (1939) as Edwards, Marvin's Valet
- Remember? (1939) as Mr. Bronson
- The Earl of Chicago (1940) as Gervase Gonwell
- The Ghost Comes Home (1940) as Hemingway
- Florian (1940) as Emperor Franz Josef
- Hullabaloo (1940) as 'Buzz' Foster
- Blonde Inspiration (1941) as Reginald
- Free and Easy (1941) as Sir George Kelvin
- A Woman's Face (1941) as Bernard Dalvik
- They Met in Bombay (1941) as General Allen
- Charley's Aunt (1941) as Redcliff
- Lady Be Good (1941) as Max Milton
- A Yank in the R.A.F. (1941) as 'Internal Injury' in Air raid drill (uncredited)
- Tarzan's Secret Treasure (1941) as Professor Elliott
- Woman of the Year (1942) as Clayton
- We Were Dancing (1942) as Major Berty Tyler-Blane
- Mrs. Miniver (1942) as Foley
- I Married an Angel (1942) as 'Whiskers'
- Pierre of the Plains (1942) as Noah Glenkins
- Cairo (1942) as Philo Cobson
- Somewhere I'll Find You (1942) as Willie Manning
- White Cargo (1942) as Skipper of the Congo Queen
- Random Harvest (1942) as 'Biffer'
- Reunion in France (1942) as Schultz
- Forever and a Day (1943) as Simpson
- Assignment in Brittany (1943) as Colonel Trane
- Above Suspicion (1943) as Dr. Mespelbrunn
- Three Hearts for Julia (1943) as John Girard
- Salute to the Marines (1943) as Mr. Henry Caspar
- Madame Curie (1943) as Dr. Becquerel
- The Canterville Ghost (1944) as Lord Canterville
- National Velvet (1944) as Farmer Ede
- The Picture of Dorian Gray (1945) as Lord George Farmour (uncredited)
- The Valley of Decision (1945) as McCready
- Kitty (1945) as Duke of Malmunster
- She Went to the Races (1945) as Dr. Pembroke
- Captain Kidd (1945) as Cary Shadwell
- The Sailor Takes a Wife (1945) as Mr. Amboy
- The Diary of a Chambermaid (1946) as Captain Lanlaire
- Cluny Brown (1946) as Sir Henry Carmel
- Monsieur Beaucaire (1946) as King Louis XV
- Piccadilly Incident (1946) as Judge
- The Imperfect Lady (1947) as Mr. Hopkins
- Thunder in the Valley (1947) as James Moore
- Green Dolphin Street (1947) as Captain O'Hara
- If Winter Comes (1947) as Mr. Fortune
- The Pirate (1948) as The Advocate
- Julia Misbehaves (1948) as Benjamin Hawkins
- The Three Musketeers (1948) as Treville
- Hills of Home (1948) as Hopps
- The Secret Garden (1949) as Ben Weatherstaff
- Challenge to Lassie (1949) as Sergeant Davie
- The Miniver Story (1950) as Mr. Foley
- Kim (1950) as Father Victor
- Grounds for Marriage (1951) as Dely Delacorte
- The Great Diamond Robbery (1954) as Bainbridge Gibbons
- Red Garters (1954) as Judge Wallace Winthrop
- While the City Sleeps (1956) as Steven (Vincent Price's Butler, Uncredited)
- Darby's Rangers (1958) as Sir Arthur Hollister
- Five Weeks in a Balloon (1962) as Consul
- Tammy and the Doctor (1963) as Jason Tripp
- The Thrill of It All (1963) as Old Tom Fraleigh
- Voice of the Hurricane (1964) as Nigel Charter
- Mary Poppins (1964) as Admiral Boom
- Rosie! (1967) as Patrick
- Bedknobs and Broomsticks (1971) as Major General Sir Brian Teagler
