= Miller of Dee =

1763 traditional song

"The Jolly Miller"
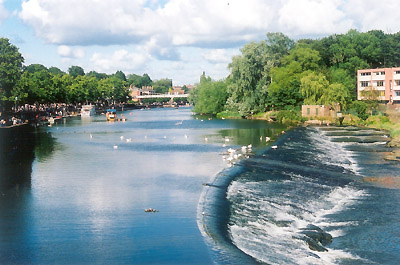
- The weir on the River Dee in Chester

Song
- Published: 1762
- Genre: Folk song
- Songwriter: Traditional

"There Was a Jolly Miller Once" is a traditional folk song (Roud #503) from the Chester area in northwest England. It is often titled "The Miller of the Dee" or "The Jolly Miller".

The song was originally part of Isaac Bickerstaffe's play, Love in a Village (1762). Subsequently, other versions of Bickerstaffe's original song were made by various other poets.

The city of Chester stands on the River Dee and a weir was built across the river here in the Middle Ages to maintain high water levels for several water mills which stood on its banks.

The River Dee rises on the eastern slopes of Dduallt in Snowdonia, Wales and enters the Dee Estuary on the outskirts of Chester. The English name for the river is derived from its Welsh name, Afon Dyfrdwy. Its Latin name was Deva.

The song is usually sung to the Welsh harp tune Llydaw (Welsh for 'Brittany'). Many settings of the tune have been made by British composers, most notably Benjamin Britten in volume three of his Folk-song arrangements (1947). Roger Quilter's setting of the song was included in the Arnold Book of Old Songs, published in 1950. Beethoven set Version 3 below, for 3 singers and piano trio, in 1819.

Several versions for choir also exist, such as that by John Rutter. In 1962 Havergal Brian wrote a comedy overture for orchestra based on the tune.

A 1997 local interest book on the history of the Mills and Millers in Chester was named after this folk song.

== The original song from Bickerstaffe's "Love in a village" (1762) ==
There dwelt a miller, hale and bold, beside the river Dee;
He danced and sang from morn till night, no lark so blithe as he;
And this the burden of his song forever used to be: -
"I care for nobody, no not I, if nobody cares for me.

"I live by my mill, God bless her! she's kindred, child, and wife;
I would not change my station for any other in life;
No lawyer, surgeon, or doctor e'er had a groat from me;
I care for nobody, no not I if nobody cares for me."

When spring begins his merry career, oh, how his heart grows gay;
No summer's drought alarms his fear, nor winter's cold decay;
No foresight mars the miller's joy, who's wont to sing and say,
"Let others toil from year to year, I live from day to day."

Thus, like the miller, bold and free, let us rejoice and sing;
The days of youth are made for glee, and time is on the wing;
This song shall pass from me to thee, along the jovial ring;
Let heart and voice and all agree to say, "Long live the king."

== Lyrics (Version 2) ==
There was a jolly miller once
Lived on the River Dee
He danced and he sang from morn till night
No lark so blithe as he.
And this the burden of his song
For ever used to be
I care for nobody, no, not I,
If nobody cares for me.

== Lyrics (Version 3) ==
There was a jolly miller once
Lived on the River Dee;
He work'd and sang from morn till night,
No lark more blithe than he.
And this the burden of his song
Forever used to be;
I care for nobody, no, not I,
If nobody cares for me.

== Popular culture ==
Jennifer Reid sings "The Miller of Dee" in episode one of the 2023 TV adaptation of The Gallows Pole. Rod Steiger, playing serial killer Christopher Gill, whistled "The Miller of Dee" several times in the 1968 film No Way to Treat a Lady. As well as this, Robert Newton sang an alternative version in the 1952 film Blackbeard the Pirate; and it was also sung by Stewart Granger in the 1944 film Love Story. The song is performed briefly in Eugene O'Neill's 1922 play, The Hairy Ape. In The Tripods, book 1 (The White Mountains), Ozymandias, a purported vagrant, recites part of "The Miller of Dee" when another character mentions that his father is a miller.
