= Richard Shaw (actor) =

English actor (1920–2010)

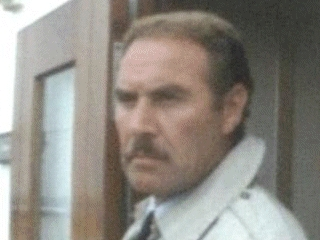
- Born: Maximilian Shalofsky; 19 November 1920; Santos, Brazil
- Died: 11 April 2010 (aged 89); London, England
- Years active: 1946–1988

Richard Shaw (né Maximilian Shalofsky; 19 November 1920 – 11 April 2010) was an English actor remembered for appearing in the science fiction franchises Quatermass and Doctor Who. He also had a recurring role as henchman Ryan in the children's series Freewheelers.

== Early life ==
Born in Brazil, Shaw was raised in the Jewish community of Whitechapel, East London, to a Latvian father and Polish mother (they met in the English capital after both fled early 20th-century Russian pogroms). Shaw changed his surname in his late teens (he was born Maximillian Shalofsky) and adopted the acting name Richard. He started his career as an adagio dancer, going on to become a weightlifter and ballroom dancer plus working as a motor mechanic and serving in the British military during World War II before beginning his acting career.

== Career ==
Shaw was a regular face on British TV networks BBC and ITV. He played many supporting roles, mostly in British crime films, throughout the 1950s, 60s and 70s. His character locked the bunker, full of Nazis and their families, before it was filled with gasoline and grenades were dropped in during the last scenes of the Second World War movie The Dirty Dozen.

During the latter part of his career, in 1980, he played the love interest of both Bet Lynch and Elsie Tanner, Dan Johnson, in the UK soap opera Coronation Street. He appeared in the 1959 BBC TV serial of Quatermass and the Pit playing drill operator Sladden. The series was remastered and rereleased by the BBC in 2018. He was asked to reprise the role in the 1967 film adaptation but was unable to do so due to other commitments. Duncan Lamont (from The Quatermass Experiment) was therefore cast instead. Shaw made three appearances in Doctor Who: The Space Museum, Frontier in Space and Underworld.

He was a regular face on BBC and ITV series over four decades. Amongst the other television shows Shaw appeared in were Ghost Squad, Richard the Lionheart, Villains, Circle of Deception, The Wednesday Play, ITV Play of the Week, BBC Sunday-Night Play, Steptoe and Son, Sykes and a..., The Saint, Biggles, Sunday Night Theatre, The Flying Doctor, The Troubleshooters, Emergency Ward 10, Clochemerle, King of the River, Crossroads, Softly, Softly, Please Sir!, Man from Interpol, Alcoa Presents One Step Beyond, Pathfinders, The Capone Investment, Softly, Softly: Task Force, Barlow at Large, The Hanged Man, The Onedin Line, The Famous Five, The Sandbaggers, Robin's Nest, George and Mildred and Matlock.

== Personal life ==
On 12 September 1959, Shaw married beauty queen Marilyn Davies (then having recently won the title of Miss Blackpool 1959) in Surrey. They had two sons: Richard Ian (b. 1960) and Darren (b. 1962).

In 1966, Shaw had a daughter, Donna, with another beauty queen, Carol Crompton (winner of Miss England 1965). Early the following year, his wife filed for divorce because of his adultery, winning custody of their two children. Shaw and Crompton were subsequently married in 1971.

== Filmography ==
=== Selected film ===
Year	Title	Role	Notes
1952	The Hour of 13	The 'Terror'	
1953	The Gambler and the Lady	Louis	
1957	Hour of Decision	Sgt. Dale	
1957	Date with Disaster	Ken Prescott	
1957	Booby Trap	Richards	
1957	Man from Tangier a.k.a. Thunder over Tangier	Johnny	
1958	The Man Who Wouldn't Talk	Inspector Barclay	
1958	The Safecracker	Bailey	
1959	First Man into Space	Witney	
1959	The House of the Seven Hawks	Police Sgt. Straatman	
1960	Bottoms Up	2nd Man	
1960	The Challenge a.k.a. It Takes a Thief	Lorry Driver	
1960	Circle of Deception	Liebert	
1960	Compelled	Jug	
1961	Partners in Crime	Bill Cross	
1962	The Pot Carriers	Prison Officer Willis	
1963	The Cracksman	Moke	
1967	Don't Lose Your Head	Captain of Soldiers	
1967	The Dirty Dozen	German Officer Who Seals the Bunker	uncredited
1970	Groupie Girl a.k.a. I Am a Groupie	Morrie	
1978	Give Us Tomorrow	1st Bank Robber	
1988	Young Toscanini	Comparsa	

=== Selected television ===
Year	Title	Role	Notes
1957	The Schirmer Inheritance	Sergeant Franz Schirmer	
1959	Quatermass and the Pit	Sladden	4 episodes
1960	Biggles	Kurt Johannis	3 episodes
1965-1978	Doctor Who	Various roles	7 episodes
1971	Freewheelers	Ryan	24 episodes
1980	Coronation Street	Dan Johnson	14 episodes
