= The Ravelled Thread =

British childrens TV series (1979-80)

- Created by: John Lucarotti
- Written by: John Lucarotti
- Directed by: Chris McMaster
- Starring: Jack Wild; Julia Lewis; Steven Grives
- Composer: Paul Hart
- Country of origin: United Kingdom
- Original language: English
- No. of series: 1
- No. of episodes: 6

Production
- Executive producer: Lewis Rudd
- Producer: Chris McMaster
- Editor: Peter Wright
- Running time: 25 mins
- Production company: Southern Television

Original release
- Network: ITV
- Release: 31 December 1979 – 4 February 1980

The Ravelled Thread is a British television drama series for children. It was set in Portsmouth during the American Civil War. Dartmouth was used for location shooting as Portsmouth was then to modern for a 19th-century setting.

== Synopsis ==
After her father is falsely accused and thrown in prison Abigail finds herself on the streets where she is rescued by a group of street kids, led by Gegor, who take her in. Together with Sedgwick, a spy posing as a journalist, they attempt to find the truth.

They uncover a plot to send armed men from Portsmouth to fight in the American Civil War.

== Cast ==
- Julia Lewis as Abigail Trumble
- Robert James as Silas Trumble
- Mark Wingett as Billyboy
- Debby Cumming as Jennie
- Jack Wild as Gegor
- Steven Grives as Sedgwick
- John Byron as Sir Daniel Maundy
- Reginald Marsh as Higby
- John Junkin as Dobbs
