= Where the Rainbow Ends =

1911 children's play by Clifford Mills and John Ramsey

- Written by: Clifford Mills and John Ramsey
- Music by: Roger Quilter
- Genre: Children's drama

Premiere
- Date: December 21, 1911
- Place: The Savoy Theatre, London
- Directed by: Charles Hawtrey

Where the Rainbow Ends is a children's play, originally written for Christmas 1911 by Clifford Mills and John Ramsey. The incidental music was composed by Roger Quilter.

Where the Rainbow Ends is a fantasy story which follows the journey of four children, two girls, two boys and a pet lion cub in search of their parents. Travelling on a magic carpet they face various dangers on their way to rescue their parents and are guarded and helped by Saint George. The rainbow story is a symbol of hope with its magic carpet of faith and its noble hero St. George of England in shining armour ready now, as in olden times, to fight and conquer the dragon of evil. Most of the story is set in ‘Rainbow Land’ complete with talking animals, mythical creatures and even a white witch.

== First production ==
The first performance took place at the Savoy Theatre, London, 21 December 1911. The play starred Reginald Owen as St. George of England and Lydia Bilbrook as well as a cast of 45 children. The children in the cast included a 12-year-old Noël Coward as well as Esmé Wynne-Tyson, Hermione Gingold and Philip Tonge. In the first few years many future stars performed in the play including Gertrude Lawrence, Nora Swinburne, Jack Hawkins and Brian Aherne. The play was originally produced by Charles Hawtrey with the children acquired and managed by Italia Conti who in future years produced the show.

Charles Hawtrey had left Italia Conti to her own devices to prepare the play but he did not realise how much music Roger Quilter was writing until the first rehearsal that he attended. He expressed fears that it seemed to be an opera rather than a play. It is a substantial play in four acts (for a time rearranged into three without losing any of the material). After the success of Rainbow, the children wanted Conti to continue to work with them, and so the Italia Conti Academy was born and, with only an occasional exception, she gave up her acting career for it.

== Reception ==
The play was very well received. A review in The Times described it as "masterly", "marvellously trained crowds of little folk-dancers", "the score has tune and dramatic meaning", and "answers its purpose very well". The Daily Telegraph said of the opening night that "the reception could not have been more enthusiastic".

The play with music was performed professionally every year for 49 years (except for two years) including during the two World Wars. Despite the financial success of the show, and the capacity houses, it became difficult to find a theatre in which to stage the production. The last professional production was at the Granada Theatre, Sutton, in Surrey, in the 1959-60 season, with Anton Dolin taking the part of St. George. The show was for years part of the regular Christmas scene. After its last professional season it has been performed regularly by amateur groups.

== Music ==
Roger Quilter's "Where the Rainbow Ends" suite was performed at the 1912 Proms on 26 September 1912. The music became known throughout the whole world through the medium of the BBC who were constantly broadcasting it on the radio.

On 23 December 1937, the 11-year-old Princess Elizabeth was taken by Queen Elizabeth to see a performance of Where the Rainbow Ends at The Holborn Empire, London. The Queen and Princess rose with the audience and the actors and joined in singing the National Anthem with a new specially written Rainbow verse that had been written for them.

== Other versions ==
After Where the Rainbow Ends was first staged, Clifford Mills turned the story into a novel, which saw a number of editions.

In 1921 the play was made into a film, directed by Horace Lisle Lucoque. It was one of Roger Livesey's first screen performances.
