= Captain Fury =

1939 film

- Film poster
- Directed by: Hal Roach
- Written by: Grover Jones; Jack Jevne; William C. deMille
- Produced by: Hal Roach
- Starring: Brian Aherne; Victor McLaglen
- Cinematography: Norbert Brodine
- Edited by: William H. Ziegler
- Music by: Marvin Hatley
- Production company: Hal Roach Studios
- Distributed by: United Artists
- Release date: May 26, 1939
- Running time: 92 minutes
- Country: United States
- Language: English
- Budget: £250,000
- Box office: $537,858

Captain Fury is a 1939 American Western film directed by Hal Roach. It is set in colonial Australia as one of Hollywood's few attempts to depict Australian history.

== Plot ==
In the 1840s, Captain Michael Fury (Brian Aherne) is an Irish patriot transported to New South Wales for his political involvement. He is farmed out as an servant to Arnold Trist, a cruel land owner who uses whipping to keep discipline. He is accompanied by fellow convicts Blackie, Coughy and Bertie.

Fury escapes from prison and meets Jeannette Dupre, the daughter of strict Mennonite François Dupre. Fury discovers that Trist is trying to drive settlers from the area to take over their land.

Fury organises the settlers to take action against Trist. He returns to prison to recruit convicts to help settlers. Trist's men attack the Bailey ranch. Fury, helped by Blackie, Coughy and Bertie, oppose them.

Jeanette begins to fall in love with Fury. Her father forbids her to see him, so she runs away. Dupre then tells Trist where Fury can be found. Trist double crosses Dupre and imprisons him. Fury and his men narrowly escape an ambush from Trist's men.

Dupre's house is burnt down and a charred body is discovered in the ruins. Fury is arrested for Dupre's murder and sentenced to hang. However Blackie hears Dupre calling from his cell, rescues him and presents him to the Governor.

Trist is exposed. He attempts to escape but is shot by a dying Coughy. The Governor grants Fury a pardon and places Blackie and Bertie in his custody.

== Cast ==
- Brian Aherne as Captain Michael Fury
- Victor McLaglen as Blackie
- Paul Lukas as François Dupre
- June Lang as Jeanette Dupre
- John Carradine as Coughy
- George Zucco as Arnold Trist
- Douglass Dumbrille as Preston
- Virginia Field as Mabel
- Charles B. Middleton as Mergon
- Lawrence Grossmith as Governor
- Lumsden Hare as Mr. John Bailey
- Mary Gordon as Mrs. Bailey
- Claud Allister as Suco
- Will Stanton as Bertie Green
- Richard Alexander as Guard
- Rondo Hatton as Convict (uncredited)

== Production ==
=== Development ===
In June 1938 it was announced that Roach would make a film of the novel Robbery Under Arms, about the bushranger Captain Starlight, starring Brian Aherne and Margaret Sullavan. Release was to be through United Artists.

Aherne made the film as the second in a two-picture deal with Roach the first being Merrily We Live. Aherne later wrote in his memoirs that the novel Roach wanted to adapt was For the Term of His Natural Life. Aherne said his fee was $40,000.

In July 1938 it was announced Roach had abandoned plans to make Robbery Under Arms and would instead be filming Captain Midnight with Aherne and Sullavan, directed by John G. Blystone. Geza Herczig and Jack Jevne were writing a script, reports stating "the title role is a variation of Captain Starlight in the original." Plans to make Robbery Under Arms had been dropped apparently out of fear of offending Australians. There also may have been an issue with the rights to the novel, which were held by Cinesound Productions. The eventual script was not based on any particular bushranger. In October, Roach announced that Norman McLeod would direct and Francine Bourdeaux would play the female lead instead of Sullavan. Bourdeaux was eventually replaced by June Lang and Roach would direct himself.

Joseph Calleia was meant to play Coughy; he dropped out and was replaced by John Carradine who was borrowed from 20th Century Fox. W. P. Lipscomb was reported as working on the script.

Australian politician Sir Earle Page visited Hal Roach studios in August 1938 and promised to assist the movie by sending over some koalas and eucalyptus trees.

=== Shooting ===
Filming was delayed because June Lang had an infected throat. It took place near Malibu Beach. Four kookaburras were hired from Catalina Island Bird Park but refused to laugh during filming. Some location work was done on Santa Cruz Island.

Both Brian Aherne and Victor McLaglen had toured Australia with stage shows and were anxious for the film to be as accurate as possible. Frank Baker, brother of Snowy Baker, acted as technical adviser. A few Australians were in the cast, including Billy Bevan and Frank Hagney.

Aherne said that Hal Roach improvised the story "from day to day... giving the cast dialogue out of his head as he went along, line by line." Aherne was not used to working this way but says Roach was always polite to him as "I don't think he has ever worked with legtimiate actors before and he is a little in awe of me."

== Release ==
The film was previewed at the Australian pavilion of the British Empire building at the New York World Fair.

== Reception ==
=== Box office ===
Aherne had also recently appeared in Juarez at Warner Bros. He later wrote in his memoirs that "Captain Fury seemed like such a farrago of nonsense to me that I was very happy to know that Juarez would rescue me by coming out at about the same time. Well, Juarez turned out to be a highly respected box-office flop while Captain Fury cleaned up and went on playing all over the world for many years with countless television runs."

=== Critical ===
Variety described it as a "lusty outdoor melodrama on the familiar Robin Hood format. There's action, gunplay, fast riding, surprise attacks, some broad comedy and a few dashes of romance... Story and direction provide lusty drama concocted in the old style. There are no detours for subtleties or development of characters. Yarn is a familiar western in setup, but switch of locale to the Australian bush country gives the rugged and easily distinguished plot a freshness which will be generally accepted."

The Los Angeles Times said the film would "amuse and entertain audiences in first rate fashion." A later review from the same paper criticised Roach's direction saying "he has learned nothing and forgotten nothing since earliest slapstick days" and that "the plot is a cartoon of Captain Blood, the only novelty being that Australia instead of the West Indies is the background."

The New York Times called it "an amusingly old-fashioned Western melodrama."

Contemporary film reviewer Stephen Vagg has written "The Australian setting is not really emphasised, it's just the usual immigrant settlers and evil land baron that you'd see in the old West."

=== Awards ===
The film was nominated for an Academy Award for Best Art Direction by Charles D. Hall.
