= List of Freewheelers episodes =

Freewheelers is a British children's action / adventure television series made by Southern Television between 1968 and 1973. Each story centred around a group of teenagers who aid a British security agent to thwart the plans of a villain and avert an international disaster.

== Series overview ==
Series	Episodes	Originally released	
Series	Episodes	First released	Last released
1	13	4 April 1968	27 June 1968
2	13	20 November 1968	12 February 1969
3	13	9 July 1969	1 October 1969
4	13	29 April 1970	22 July 1970
5	13	20 January 1971	14 April 1971
6	13	27 September 1971	20 December 1971
7	13	4 September 1972	27 November 1972
8	13	6 August 1973	5 November 1973

== Episodes ==
Each of the eight series comprised 13 x 30 minute episodes divided into two or three linked stories. All eight series were produced by Chris McMaster.

For extant episodes, the episode title and the names of director and writer are taken from the programme credits (except in the case of Chris McMaster who did not take a director credit). Information for the remaining episodes is from published sources, principally contemporary listings and Time Screen magazine articles and episode guides. Air dates are from TV listings for the earliest broadcast, some ITV regions may have been later.

Under Status for the best known copy, "TR" indicates broadcast standard telerecording, "VT" indicates broadcast standard videotape, and "VHS" indicates the domestic recording format.

=== Series 1 (1968) ===
No. overall	No. in series	Title	Directed by	Written by	Original release date	Availability
1	1	Menace!: The Sleepers	Chris McMaster	James Hopes	4 April 1968	TR (Note: A telerecording of the full episode is held at the Wessex Film and Sound Archive (collection AV763))
2	2	Menace!: No Smoke	Chris McMaster	James Hopes	11 April 1968	TR
3	3	Menace!: The Camp	Chris McMaster	James Hopes	18 April 1968	TR
4	4	Menace!: The Ultimatum	Chris McMaster	James Hopes	25 April 1968	TR
5	5	Menace!: Face To Face	Chris McMaster	James Hopes	2 May 1968	TR (Note: A copy of the full episode is held in the British Film Institute collections (reference number 786172))
6	6	Recipe for Danger: Too Many Cooks	John Braybon	Barry Busbridge	9 May 1968	TR
7	7	Recipe for Danger: One Man's Meat	John Braybon	Barry Busbridge	16 May 1968	TR
8	8	Recipe for Danger: Trouble Brewing	John Braybon	Barry Busbridge	23 May 1968	TR
9	9	Recipe for Danger: Bring to the Boil	John Braybon	Barry Busbridge	30 May 1968	TR
10	10	The Big Freeze: Icarus	Chris McMaster	Trevor Preston	6 June 1968	TR
11	11	The Big Freeze: Valkyrie	Chris McMaster	Trevor Preston	13 June 1968	TR
12	12	The Big Freeze: Anvil	Chris McMaster	Trevor Preston	20 June 1968	TR
13	13	The Big Freeze: Gotterdammerung	Chris McMaster	Trevor Preston	27 June 1968	TR

=== Series 2 (1968–69) ===
No. overall	No. in series	Title	Directed by	Written by	Original release date	Availability
14	1	The Zander Plot: (Note: The main story names for series two were listed in the TV Times but did not appear on screen.) Breakout	Chris McMaster	Don Douglas & Keith Miles	20 November 1968	Lost (Note: Missing episode, no copies of the full episode are known to exist.)
15	2	The Zander Plot: Treasure	Chris McMaster	Don Douglas & Keith Miles	27 November 1968	Lost
16	3	The Zander Plot: Master Plan	Peter Croft	Don Douglas & Keith Miles	4 December 1968	Lost
17	4	The Zander Plot: The Code	Peter Croft	Don Douglas & Keith Miles	11 December 1968	Lost
18	5	The Zander Plot: The Lighthouse	Peter Croft	Rick Trader Whitcombe	18 December 1968	Lost
19	6	The Zander Plot: The Stones	Peter Croft	Rick Trader Whitcombe	25 December 1968	Lost
20	7	The Zander Plot: Time Bomb!	Chris McMaster	Barry Busbridge	1 January 1969	Lost
21	8	The Zander Plot: Doomsday!	Chris McMaster	Barry Busbridge	8 January 1969	TR
22	9	The Secret Base: The Key	Peter Croft	Rick Trader Whitcombe	15 January 1969	Lost
23	10	The Secret Base: Black Knight	Peter Croft	Rick Trader Whitcombe	22 January 1969	Lost
24	11	The Secret Base: Vulcan	Chris McMaster	Bryan Cooper	29 January 1969	Lost
25	12	The Secret Base: Double Trouble	Chris McMaster	Bryan Cooper	5 February 1969	Lost
26	13	The Secret Base: Damocles!	Chris McMaster	Barry Busbridge	12 February 1969	Lost

=== Series 3 (1969) ===
No. overall	No. in series	Title	Directed by	Written by	Original release date	Availability
27	1	"Rammed!"	Peter Croft	Chris McMaster	9 July 1969	Lost
28	2	"The Banshee"	Peter Croft	John Cannon	16 July 1969	Lost
29	3	"Minded"	Chris McMaster	Barry Busbridge	23 July 1969	Lost
30	4	"Trapped"	Chris McMaster	John Cannon	30 July 1969	Lost
31	5	"Tanks!"	Peter Croft	Barry Busbridge	6 August 1969	Lost
32	6	"Caged!"	Peter Croft	Barry Busbridge	13 August 1969	Lost
33	7	"The Tower"	Chris McMaster	John Cannon	20 August 1969	Lost
34	8	"Triton"	Chris McMaster	Chris McMaster	27 August 1969	Lost
35	9	"Kidnapped"	Chris McMaster	Paul Erickson	3 September 1969	Lost
36	10	"The Voyage"	Peter Croft	Paul Erickson	10 September 1969	Lost
37	11	"The Island"	Peter Croft	Keith Miles	17 September 1969	Lost
38	12	"Blockade"	Peter Croft	Keith Miles	24 September 1969	Lost
39	13	"Thunderbolt!"	Chris McMaster	Chris McMaster	1 October 1969	Lost

=== Series 4 (1970) ===
No. overall	No. in series	Title	Directed by	Written by	Original release date	Availability
40	1	"Not In Jest"	Chris McMaster	Bryan Cooper	29 April 1970	Lost
41	2	"A Thing Like Death"	Chris McMaster	Rick Trader Whitcombe	6 May 1970	Lost
42	3	"Package Deal"	Chris McMaster	Bryan Cooper	13 May 1970	Lost
43	4	"Spartika"	Chris McMaster	Rick Trader Whitcombe	20 May 1970	Lost
44	5	"Merely Players"	Chris McMaster	Rick Trader Whitcombe	27 May 1970	Lost
45	6	"Agincourt"	Chris McMaster	Chris McMaster	3 June 1970	Lost
46	7	"Microdot"	Peter Croft	Paul Erickson	10 June 1970	Lost
47	8	"Kythera!"	Peter Croft	Paul Erickson	17 June 1970	Lost
48	9	"The Dictator"	Peter Croft	Paul Erickson	24 June 1970	Lost
49	10	"Petrov"	Chris McMaster	Paul Erickson	1 July 1970	Lost
50	11	"Decoy"	Chris McMaster	Keith Miles	8 July 1970	Lost
51	12	"Firing Squad"	Peter Croft	Keith Miles	15 July 1970	Lost
52	13	"Explosion"	Chris McMaster	Keith Miles	22 July 1970	Lost

=== Series 5 (1971) ===
No. overall	No. in series	Title	Directed by	Written by	Original release date	Availability
53	1	"Sniper!"	Peter Croft	Richard Montez	20 January 1971	Lost
54	2	"Spin Off"	Peter Croft	Richard Montez	27 January 1971	Lost
55	3	"The Mill"	Peter Croft	Richard Montez	3 February 1971	Lost
56	4	"Blackmail"	Peter Croft	Richard Montez	10 February 1971	Lost
57	5	"Zukov"	Peter Croft	Richard Montez	17 February 1971	Lost
58	6	"Russian Roulette"	Peter Croft	Richard Montez	24 February 1971	Lost
59	7	"Destruct"	Chris McMaster	Richard Montez	3 March 1971	Lost
60	8	"Zyton!"	Chris McMaster	Paul Erickson	10 March 1971	Lost
61	9	"Entombed"	Chris McMaster	Paul Erickson	17 March 1971	Lost
62	10	"Roll Up"	Chris McMaster	Paul Erickson	24 March 1971	Lost
63	11	"Booby Trap"	Chris McMaster	Paul Erickson	31 March 1971	Lost
64	12	"Pipeline"	Chris McMaster	Paul Erickson	7 April 1971	Lost
65	13	"The Answer"	Chris McMaster	Paul Erickson	14 April 1971	Lost

=== Series 6 (1971) ===
(Note: Series 6 was released on DVD in 2009 by Simply Home Entertainment)

No. overall	No. in series	Title	Directed by	Written by	Original release date	Availability
66	1	"Nero"	Chris McMaster	Paul Erickson	27 September 1971	VT (Note: The episode video master held by Renown Pictures Ltd Archived 14 February 2013 at the Wayback Machine) (Note: A copy of the full episode is held at Wessex Film and Sound Archive (collection AV763).)
67	2	"Operation Seagull"	Chris McMaster	Paul Erickson	4 October 1971	VT
68	3	"Medusa"	Dave Heather	Paul Erickson	11 October 1971	VT
69	4	"Mayday"	Dave Heather	Paul Erickson	18 October 1971	VT
70	5	"Pirates"	Dave Heather	Paul Erickson	25 October 1971	VT
71	6	"The Threat"	Dave Heather	Paul Erickson	1 November 1971	VT
72	7	"Doomsday"	Chris McMaster	Paul Erickson	8 November 1971	VT
73	8	"Black Box"	Chris McMaster	Richard Montez	15 November 1971	VT
74	9	"Cypher"	Chris McMaster	Richard Montez	22 November 1971	VT
75	10	"The Parcel"	Chris McMaster	Richard Montez	29 November 1971	VT
76	11	"The Race"	Chris McMaster	Richard Montez	6 December 1971	VT
77	12	"Red Herring"	Chris McMaster	Richard Montez	13 December 1971	VT
78	13	"Pay Off"	Chris McMaster	Richard Montez	20 December 1971	VT

=== Series 7 (1972) ===
No. overall	No. in series	Title	Directed by	Written by	Original release date	Availability
79	1	"Traitor!"	Dave Heather	Ralph Wright	4 September 1972	VT
80	2	"The Race"	Dave Heather	Ralph Wright	11 September 1972	VT
81	3	"Framed!"	Chris McMaster	Ralph Wright	18 September 1972	VT
82	4	"Vertigo!"	Chris McMaster	Ralph Wright	25 September 1972	VHS (Note: A restoration of episode 82 was performed by Talking Pictures TV from a domestic recording and the original location films, and first broadcast by them on 24 July 2017.)
83	5	"The Knot"	Dave Heather	Ralph Wright	2 October 1972	VT
84	6	"The War Game"	Dave Heather	Ralph Wright	9 October 1972	VT
85	7	"Helga!"	Chris McMaster	Ralph Wright	16 October 1972	VT
86	8	"Helga! (Note: Episodes 85 and 86 have the same name due to a production error)"	Chris McMaster	Peter Lover	23 October 1972	VT
87	9	"Midsummer"	Chris McMaster	Peter Lover	30 October 1972	VT
88	10	"The Mine"	Chris McMaster	Peter Lover	6 November 1972	VT
89	11	"Tricked!"	Chris McMaster	Peter Lover	13 November 1972	VT
90	12	"Ares!"	Chris McMaster	Peter Lover	20 November 1972	VT
91	13	"Archimedes"	Chris McMaster	Peter Lover	27 November 1972	VT

=== Series 8 (1973) ===
No. overall	No. in series	Title	Directed by	Written by	Original release date	Availability
92	1	"Contact!"	Chris McMaster	Ralph Wright	6 August 1973	VT
93	2	"Libra!"	Chris McMaster	Ralph Wright	13 August 1973	VHS
94	3	"The Auction"	Bob Leng	Ralph Wright	20 August 1973	VHS
95	4	"The Third Man!"	Bob Leng	Ralph Wright	3 September 1973	VHS
96	5	"Rapids!"	Chris McMaster	David Stevens	10 September 1973	VHS
97	6	"Darkness at Noon"	Chris McMaster	David Stevens	17 September 1973	VHS
98	7	"Double-Cross"	Bob Leng	David Stevens	24 September 1973	VHS
99	8	"Impasse!"	Bob Leng	David Stevens	1 October 1973	VHS
100	9	"The Crypt"	Chris McMaster	David Stevens	8 October 1973	VHS
101	10	"Switched!"	Chris McMaster	David Stevens	15 October 1973	VT
102	11	"Break-Up!"	Chris McMaster	Ralph Wright	22 October 1973	VHS
103	12	"The Think Bank"	Chris McMaster	Ralph Wright	29 October 1973	VHS
104	13	"The Hoist!"	Chris McMaster	Ralph Wright	5 November 1973	VHS

== Archive status ==
53 of the 104 episodes exist: 27 as broadcast masters, 14 as telerecordings and 12 in domestic formats (e.g. VHS). The remaining 51 episodes are missing.

The telerecordings include all 13 episodes of Series 1. The only series for which a complete set of video masters is held is Series 6, which was released on DVD in 2009.

The location film segments for all episodes are at Wessex Film and Sound Archive (collection AV763).
