= John Ramsey (pseudonym) =

John Ramsey (1887–1972) was a pseudonym used by Reginald Owen. He was co-author of the 1911 play Where the Rainbow Ends with Mrs Clifford Mills and music by R. Quilter. Owen provided stage know-how.

== Plays ==
- Where the Rainbow Ends (1911) written with Clifford Mills
- The Joker (1915) written with Ernest Schofield
- The Jolly Family (1927)
