= Safety First =

1926 film directed by Fred Paul

- Directed by: Fred Paul
- Written by: Geoffrey H. Malins
- Based on: Safety First (novel) by Margot Neville
- Starring: Brian Aherne; Queenie Thomas; Mary Brough; Humberston Wright
- Production company: Stoll Pictures
- Distributed by: Stoll Pictures
- Release date: October 1926
- Running time: 6,000 feet
- Country: United Kingdom
- Languages: Silent; English intertitles

Safety First is a 1926 British silent comedy film directed by Fred Paul and starring Brian Aherne, Queenie Thomas and Mary Brough. It was based on a novel of the same name by Margot Neville.

== Cast ==
- Brian Aherne as Hippocrates Rayne
- Queenie Thomas as Nanda Macdonald
- Mary Brough as Caroline Lowecraft
- Patrick Susands as Birdie Nightingale
- Doreen Banks as Angela StJacques
- Humberston Wright as The Butler
- Fred Morgan as Collins

== See also ==
- Crazy People (1934)

== Bibliography ==
- Goble, Alan. The Complete Index to Literary Sources in Film. Walter de Gruyter, 2011. ISBN 9783110951943
- Low, Rachel. The History of British Film: Volume IV, 1918–1929. Routledge, 1997.
