= A Bullet Is Waiting =

1954 film by John Farrow

- Film poster
- Directed by: John Farrow
- Screenplay by: Thames Williamson; Casey Robinson
- Story by: Thames Williamson
- Produced by: Howard Welsch
- Starring: Jean Simmons; Rory Calhoun; Stephen McNally; Brian Aherne
- Cinematography: Franz Planer
- Edited by: Otto Ludwig
- Music by: Dimitri Tiomkin
- Color process: Technicolor
- Production company: Columbia Pictures
- Distributed by: Columbia Pictures
- Release date: September 4, 1954
- Running time: 90 minutes 82 minutes (Sony Pictures Television Print)
- Country: United States
- Language: English

A Bullet Is Waiting is a 1954 American film noir crime Western film directed by John Farrow and starring Jean Simmons, Rory Calhoun, Stephen McNally and Brian Aherne.

== Plot ==
A small plane carrying Frank Munson and handcuffed prisoner Ed Stone crashes in the California wilderness. Ed unlocks the cuffs and flees, encountering a woman named Cally who is minding sheep. Frank follows and identifies himself as a Utah lawman who, after tracking Ed for nearly two years, finally caught him. Cally is hesitant to trust either man. She is an educated woman whose father, a former Oxford University professor, lives with her but is currently away.

As a torrential rain falls, Ed attempts to escape, but the passage is flooded. Cally tries to warn him but pulls a knife when Ed tries to rape her. At the cabin, Frank has no weapon and searches for a rifle that Cally has hidden. Ed returns and, while trapped there during the storm, explains to Cally that he shot Frank's brother in self-defense. In response, Frank had himself deputized but intends to kill him rather than bring him to justice.

Cally's father returns and is startled to find two men there. He hears their stories and, aware that his daughter is falling in love with Ed, offers him a chance to surrender to the authorities. With a gun in his hand and a single bullet in the chamber, Ed proves his intent by refusing to shoot Frank when he has the chance. He resolves to surrender himself to the police.

== Cast ==
- Jean Simmons as Cally Canham
- Rory Calhoun as Ed Stone
- Stephen McNally as Frank Munson
- Brian Aherne as David Canham

== Production ==
Producer Howard Welsch had assumed Jean Simmons's contract from RKO and transferred it to 20th Century-Fox after making the film.

Filming began on December 3, 1953.

In April 1954, Welsch signed a deal with Columbia to distribute the film.

== Reception ==
In a contemporary review for The New York Times, critic A. H. Weiler called A Bullet Is Waiting a "strangely verbose vehicle carrying more than a fair load of primary philosophy and a minimum of realistic drama and character delineation."
