= Hired Wife =

1940 film directed by William A. Seiter

- Directed by: William A. Seiter
- Written by: Richard Connell; Gladys Lehman
- Story by: George Beck
- Produced by: William A. Seiter; Glenn Tryon
- Starring: Rosalind Russell; Brian Aherne; Virginia Bruce
- Cinematography: Milton R. Krasner
- Edited by: Milton Carruth
- Music by: Frank Skinner
- Production company: William A. Seiter Productions
- Distributed by: Universal Pictures
- Release date: September 13, 1940 (United States)
- Running time: 96 minutes
- Country: United States
- Language: English

Hired Wife is a 1940 American romantic comedy film directed by William A. Seiter and starring Rosalind Russell, Brian Aherne and Virginia Bruce.

== Plot ==
When Stephen Dexter, boss of Dexter Cement, competes with the giants in his industry, they strike back by threatening to get an injunction against him the next day and tie up his business if he will not cooperate. Facing bankruptcy, he still refuses to give in. Van Horn, his lawyer and longtime friend, suggests he get married that day and transfer all his assets to his new wife to get around the injunction.

Stephen wants to marry his current girlfriend, blonde Phyllis Walden, but his second in command, Kendal Browning, has other ideas. Early on in their working relationship, she had fended off his romantic advances, but has come to regret it. When Stephen sends her to see Phyllis, Kendal words the offer is such a way that Phyllis suspects it is a trap designed to expose her gold-digging motives. So she turns the second-hand marriage proposal down. Running out of time, Stephen asks Kendal to marry him. She accepts, and they fly to South Carolina to see a justice of the peace.

Kendal eventually confesses to Stephen what she did to make Phyllis reject him, angering her husband. However, they have to live under the same roof to avoid suspicion that their marriage is a sham. Van Horn becomes a reluctant chaperon, rooming with Stephen.

When Stephen sneaks away to a nightclub to explain things to Phyllis, Kendal follows. She runs into her handsome friend Jose, who is curious to see what Stephen looks like. Kendal comes up with the idea to have the penniless Jose pose as a wealthy man to divert Phyllis.

When Stephen's business competitors give up their underhanded tactics, he asks Kendal for a divorce. To his surprise, she refuses to give him one. However, the justice of the peace who married them shows up at the office and apologizes: his license had expired, so the marriage is invalid. When Phyllis and Jose separately converge on the office, he is finally revealed to be a fraud financed by Kendal. Kendal and Jose leave. Afterward, though, Stephen and Phyllis admit to themselves that they really love Kendal and Jose, respectively. Both couples are happily reunited.

== Cast ==
- Rosalind Russell as Kendal Browning
- Brian Aherne as Stephen Dexter
- Virginia Bruce as Phyllis Walden
- Robert Benchley as Van Horn
- John Carroll as Jose [Braganza]
- Hobart Cavanaugh as William, Kendal's office assistant
- Richard Lane as McNab
- William Davidson as Mumford, a customer of Dexter Cement

== Adaptations ==
Hired Wife was dramatized as a radio play on an hour-long broadcast of Lux Radio Theatre on November 3, 1941. William Powell and Myrna Loy play the Aherne/Russell roles. On September 22, 1941, at the end of Lydia Cecil B. DeMille announced that Powell and Loy would play in a performance of Third Finger, Left Hand on September 29. Instead Douglas Fairbanks, Jr. and Martha Scott performed.

== Bibliography ==
- Sikov, Ed. Screwball: Hollywood's Madcap Romantic Comedies. Crown Publishers, 1989.
