= Freewheelers =

British children's TV series (1968–1973)

- Genre: Children's television series
- Country of origin: United Kingdom
- Original language: English
- No. of series: 8
- No. of episodes: 104 (51 missing) (list of episodes)

Production
- Producer: Chris McMaster
- Production locations: Southern England, Spain, France, Sweden, Netherlands
- Cinematography: Stan Bréhaut
- Editor: Michael Womersley
- Running time: 24 mins
- Production company: Southern Television

Original release
- Network: ITV
- Release: 4 April 1968 – 5 May 1973

Freewheelers is a British television series made by Southern Television between 1968 and 1973 for the ITV network. It was created by the television producer Chris McMaster, who was aware of the popularity of adult action series such as The Avengers and Department S amongst teenagers and saw the potential of a version aimed at a younger audience.

== Plot ==
In the opening story, three young people become caught up in the plans of ex-Nazi officer Karl von Gelb to "reverse the verdict of the last war" and inflict revenge on his former enemies. Under the direction of Colonel Buchan of MI5, the trio thwart Gelb's scheme to launch Polaris missiles on London from a captured nuclear submarine. This set the template for future stories, with the teenagers regularly preventing Gelb from carrying out massive and ingenious threats to Britain's security.

== Background and production ==
The format of fast-paced action and outdoor locations was enormously successful and the programme enjoyed a large home audience as well as gaining overseas sales. In colour from the fourth series, location filming moved out of the South of England with scenes shot in Spain and Mallorca. Future locations would include Amsterdam, Sweden and the Ardèche.

High-tech gadgets were a regular component, often machines developed for peaceful purposes seized by the villain and turned to criminal use. Teams of scientists were also regularly kidnapped and coerced into building similar gadgets: devices for changing the weather, controlling minds and melting metal at great distances all featured.

Strong incidental and closing music by Laurie Johnson and a memorable theme tune, the Carnaby Street Pop Orchestra's "Teenage Carnival" composed by Keith Mansfield, helped maintain the momentum, and von Gelb's appearances were usually accompanied by stirring passages from Wagner's Ring Cycle. The frequent waterborne sequences of the programme were recorded using Southern Television's unique marine outside broadcast unit, known as Southerner, which also doubled as von Gelb's ship.

== Cast and characters ==
Freewheelers cast

Ronald Leigh-Hunt, as the British secret service agent Colonel Buchan, was the most regular cast member, appearing in series 1–4 and series 6. In 1971, he had a major part in the feature film Le Mans and when production of that overran by two months, he was unavailable for series 5; the absence of his character from the series was explained as him being on an overseas mission. The teenagers, almost invariably referred to as "the kids", varied over the years. The original line-up consisted of Tom Owen, Mary Maude and Gregory Phillips. Chris Chittell featured in series 2 and 3 and Adrian Wright played Mike Hobbs in series 4–7. Carole Mowlam played Fiona in series 3-4. Former Doctor Who companion Wendy Padbury joined the cast in series 5 as art student Sue Craig. Her youthful looks enabled her to portray a character several years her junior, although by the final series, with the actress in her mid-twenties and then married to actor Melvyn Hayes, careful camera angles were required to conceal an advancing pregnancy. Padbury was the only regular actor to appear in the eighth series, which was a single 13-part serial. She was teamed with co-star Martin Neil, who played Sue's boyfriend Dave. Caroline Ellis replaced Padbury in 1972 for series 7 only, playing Jill Rowles.

Initially Geoffrey Toone played the resident villain Karl von Gelb, a former high-ranking SS officer. To avoid prejudicing potential sales of the programme to West Germany, references to the character's Nazi past were dropped in series 3. From series 4, the character was replaced by a succession of similarly crazed criminal masterminds, such as Jerome Willis as Professor Nero and Commander Caine played by Kevin Stoney. The criminals were aided by various henchmen, perhaps most memorably by Ryan (Richard Shaw) and the beret-wearing Burke (Michael Ripper) in series 5 and 6.

== Episodes ==
Series	Episodes	Originally released	
Series	Episodes	First released	Last released
1	13	4 April 1968	27 June 1968
2	13	20 November 1968	12 February 1969
3	13	9 July 1969	1 October 1969
4	13	29 April 1970	22 July 1970
5	13	20 January 1971	14 April 1971
6	13	27 September 1971	20 December 1971
7	13	4 September 1972	27 November 1972
8	13	6 August 1973	5 November 1973

== Home release and repeats ==
The first five series were wiped by Southern but telerecordings of series 1 and a single episode from series 2 survive, and the final three series exist in various formats.

A Region 2 DVD of series 6 was released in April 2009. Repeats of the surviving episodes of Freewheelers were shown on the British satellite television channel Film 24 in 2010 and on Talking Pictures TV in 2017 and 2019. In December 2021, series 6 and 7 were made available on the Talking Pictures streaming service "TPTV Encore".

== Publications ==
The children's magazine Look-in featured a weekly cartoon strip of Freewheelers. Two novelisations by Look-in editor Alan Fennell, featuring the characters from series 6, were published in paperback: The Sign of the Beaver (1971) and The Spy Game (1972). A book about the series, Calling White Knight – The definitive book about Freewheelers by Mark Harris, was published in December 2019.
