= Thames Williamson =

American novelist

Thames Williamson (1894–1961) was an American writer. He wrote novels and screenplays.

== Select Credits ==
- Next Time I Marry (1938)
- Mildred Pierce (1945) - uncredited
- Cheyenne (1947)
- Escape Me Never (1947)
- The Last Bandit (1949)
- Brimstone (1950)
- The Savage Horde (1950)
- A Bullet Is Waiting (1954) - film, novel
- Taming Sutton's Gal (1957)
