= Arnold Book of Old Songs =

Song

The Arnold Book of Old Songs is a collection of English, Scottish, Irish, Welsh and French folk songs and traditional songs, with new piano accompaniments by Roger Quilter. Quilter dedicated it to and named it after his nephew Arnold Guy Vivian, who perished at the hands of German forces in Italy in 1943.

The collection consists of sixteen songs: five songs were written in 1921, and another eleven were written in 1942. Only the latter eleven were written with Vivian in mind at the outset.

== Songs written in 1921 ==
Five of the songs were written in 1921, with each being dedicated to a friend, relative or popular singer of the day. These were:

- "Drink to Me Only with Thine Eyes": dedicated to the baritone Arthur Frith
- "Over the Mountains"
- "Barbara Allen": dedicated to the Irish baritone Frederick Ranalow
- "Three Poor Mariners": dedicated to Guy Vivian (Arnold Vivian's father and Roger Quilter's brother-in-law)
- "The Jolly Miller": dedicated to Joseph Farrington.

== Songs written for Arnold Vivian in 1942 ==
Arnold Guy Vivian was Quilter's nephew, the son of his sister Norah by her second husband Guy Noel Vivian. He was born on 21 May 1915, and named after Quilter's and Norah's brother Arnold Quilter, who had been killed at Gallipoli only 15 days earlier, on 6 May. Roger Quilter had been closer to Arnold than to any of his other siblings and he became deeply attached to his namesake nephew. They found they were in tune with each other's overall gentle sensitivity. Arnold Vivian had a high, light tenor voice and often sang his uncle's songs. Quilter dedicated his song "Sigh No More, Ladies", from the 3rd Shakespeare Set, Op. 30, to his nephew.

Arnold Vivian joined the Grenadier Guards (6th Battalion) at the start of World War II and in 1942 left England for active service. Quilter wrote a deeply personal song called "What Will You Do, Love?" for him at that time. It was never intended for publication, and was recorded for the first time in 2005. At around the same time Quilter started working on eleven new arrangements of old songs, to have something to welcome his nephew home from the war.

It was not to be. In 1943, Arnold Vivian was listed as missing in action. He never returned and his family did not learn his fate until after the war had ended. He had been taken prisoner-of-war by German forces in Tunis in North Africa. Some months later he and his friend Lord Brabourne, also from the 6th Battalion, were being transported by train from an Italian POW camp to Germany, and they escaped near Bronzolo in the South Tyrol. They were recaptured on 15 September 1943 and summarily executed the same day. They were shot in the back of the neck while being made to kneel on railway tracks. Their bodies were left on the side of the tracks by the Germans as a warning to others, but the local people gave them a burial. They were later reinterred in the war cemetery in Padua. The atrocity was later investigated as a war crime, and a former German officer was found guilty and executed.

The news of these events devastated Quilter and could only have added to the mental decline he was already exhibiting. As an epitaph to his nephew, Quilter added the five earlier songs from 1921 to the eleven new ones and dedicated the entire set to his memory, even naming it after him, the Arnold Book of Old Songs. Each of the 16 songs bears an individual dedication "To the memory of Arnold Guy Vivian".

The songs were initially published separately, by October 1947, and as a set in 1950. Roger Quilter died in 1953.

== Lyrics ==
Most of the songs have their well known words, but the three French songs ("The Man Behind the Plough", "My Lady's Garden" and "Pretty Month of May") and the sole Welsh song ("The Ash Grove") employ new sets of words provided by Rodney Bennett (1890-1948), a children's book author and poet who had often worked with Quilter on his songs and works for the theatre. Rodney Bennett was the father of Sir Richard Rodney Bennett. Bennett's words to "The Ash Grove" were written in direct response to news of Arnold Vivian's death.

Also, the words to "My Lady Greensleeves" are attributed to an Irish poet named John Irvine, and differ from the traditional ones. Quilter and Irvine had worked on a duet version of the song, but the solo voice version was the one published in The Arnold Book of Old Songs.

== The songs ==
The songs are varied in rhythm, tempo, mood, atmosphere and national origin. Quilter often captures a quality that has been described as "golden nostalgia".

Title	Country	Music	Words	Key
"Drink to Me Only with Thine Eyes"	England	18th century melody	Ben Jonson	E♭ major
"Over the Mountains"	England	Old English melody	Percy's Reliques	G major
"My Lady Greensleeves"	England	Old English melody	John Irvine	F minor
"Believe Me, if All Those Endearing Young Charms"	Ireland	Old Irish melody	Thomas Moore	E♭ major
"Oh! 'Tis Sweet to Think"	Ireland	Old Irish melody	Thomas Moore	G major
"Ye Banks and Braes"	Scotland	Old Scottish melody	Robert Burns	G♭ major
"Charlie is My Darling"	Scotland	Jacobite marching song, 1775	Anonymous	C minor
"Ca' the Yowes to the Knowes"	Scotland	Old Scottish melody	Robert Burns	A minor
"The Man Behind the Plough" ("Le pauvre labourer")	France	Old French melody	Rodney Bennett	G major
"My Lady's Garden" ("L'amour de moi")	France	Old French melody	Rodney Bennett	D♭ major
"Pretty Month of May" ("Joli moi de Mai")	France	Old French melody	Anonymous	E♭ major
"The Jolly Miller"	England	Old English melody	Anonymous	G minor
"Barbara Allen"	England	Old English melody	Traditional	D major
"Three Poor Mariners"	England	Old English melody	Anonymous	E♭ major
"Since First I Saw Your Face"	England	Thomas Ford, 17th century	Anonymous	E major
"The Ash Grove"	Wales	Old Welsh melody	Rodney Bennett	A♭ major

== Grainger's assessment ==
Roger Quilter's friend Percy Grainger was very favourably impressed with the Arnold Book of Old Songs. He wrote:

They are a lovely string of gems, most touching in their humanity & typical of the heart-revealing skill you have built up of weaving such tune-enhancing arabesques & comments round the melody in the accompaniment – comments that inject new meaning into the line & text of the melody ... How right of you to have prepared this nose-gay for your beloved Kinsman, & to have dedicated them to his memory, since he could not return to enjoy them. I hardly know what we should consider worth thinking & feeling about those days (& all days) if it is not about the sweet & noble young men lost in war.

== Sources ==
- Valerie Langfield, Roger Quilter: His Life and Music
