= Object Z =

1965 British TV science fiction series

- Opening titles
- Genre: Science fiction
- Written by: Chris McMaster
- Directed by: Daphne Shadwell
- Starring: Ralph Nossek; Trevor Bannister; Celia Bannerman
- Country of origin: United Kingdom
- Original language: English
- No. of series: 1
- No. of episodes: 6

Production
- Production company: Rediffusion London

Original release
- Network: ITV
- Release: 19 October – 23 November 1965

Object Z is a 1965 six-part British ITV television science fiction series produced and directed by Daphne Shadwell, and starring Ralph Nossek, Trevor Bannister and Celia Bannerman. It was written by Chris McMaster and made by Rediffusion.

== Plot ==
Professor Ramsay discovers a mysterious object approaching Earth. Its impact could destroy life on Earth, which causes panic. TV producer Peter Barry and his assistant Diana Winters become involved in events.

== Cast ==
- Ralph Nossek as Professor Ramsay
- Trevor Bannister as Peter Barry
- Celia Bannerman as Diana Winters
- William Abney as Ian Murray
- Julian Somers as Sir John Chandos
- Terence Donovan as Captain Wade
- Arthur White as Keeler
- Jeffry Wickham as Dr. Baranov

== Sequel ==
A 6-episode sequel, Object Z Returns, was broadcast in 1966, between 22 February and 29 march, but the episodes were subsequently wiped from the archives.

== Home media ==
The entire series one was released on Region 2 DVD and Blu-ray in 2025.
