= Luck of the Navy =

1938 film directed by Norman Lee

- Directed by: Norman Lee
- Written by: Clifford Grey
- Based on: The Luck of the Navy by Clifford Mills
- Produced by: Walter C. Mycroft
- Starring: Geoffrey Toone; Judy Kelly; Clifford Evans
- Cinematography: Walter J. Harvey
- Edited by: Walter Stokvis
- Music by: Harry Acres
- Production company: Associated British Picture Corporation
- Distributed by: Associated British Film Distributors
- Release date: November 1938
- Running time: 64 minutes
- Country: United Kingdom
- Language: English
- Budget: £30,564

Luck of the Navy is a 1938 British comedy thriller film directed by Norman Lee and starring Geoffrey Toone, Judy Kelly and Clifford Evans. Shot at Elstree Studios it was based on the play The Luck of the Navy by Mrs Clifford Mills and is also known by the alternative title of North Sea Patrol.

== Plot ==
With Britain on the brink of war, an enemy spy plans to steal secret documents and lay the blame on Clive Stanton.

== Cast ==
- Geoffrey Toone as Commander Clive Stanton
- Judy Kelly as Cynthia Maybridge
- Clifford Evans as Lieutenant Peel
- John Wood as Sub Lieutenant Eden
- Albert Burdon as Noakes
- Alf Goddard as Tomkins
- Henry Oscar as Perrin
- Kenneth Kent as Colonel Suvaroff
- Marguerite Allan as Anna Suvaroff
- Edmund Breon as Admiral Maybridge
- Doris Hare as Mrs Maybridge
- Daphne Raglan as Dora Maybridge
- Olga Lindo as Mrs Rance
- Diana Beaumont as Millie
- Leslie Perrins as Briggs
- Frank Fox as François
- Joan Fred Emney as Cook
- Ronald Adam as Enemy Ship's Captain

== Bibliography ==
- Wood, Linda. British Films, 1927-1939. British Film Institute, 1986.
