= The Luck of the Navy (play) =

The Luck of the Navy is a British comedy thriller play by Mrs Clifford Mills in which a Royal Navy sailor is nearly framed by an enemy agent for the theft of secret documents. It was first performed in 1918 and continued to be performed post-war in London and by touring companies. Between 1919 and 1930 it was performed over 900 times in 148 theatres. It was also performed internationally: in Adelaide in 1920, Sydney in 1928 and Wellington in 1920.

It was revived at the Playhouse Theatre in London on 24 December 1934 and ran for 22 performances.

== Film adaptations ==
In 1927, it was made into a silent film, The Luck of the Navy, directed by Fred Paul.

In 1937, it was adapted into a sound film, Luck of the Navy, directed by Norman Lee and starring Geoffrey Toone and Judy Kelly.

== Bibliography ==
- Nicoll, Allardyce. English Drama, 1900-1930: The Beginnings of the Modern Period. Cambridge University Press, 1973.
