= Geoffrey Toone =

British actor (1910–2005)

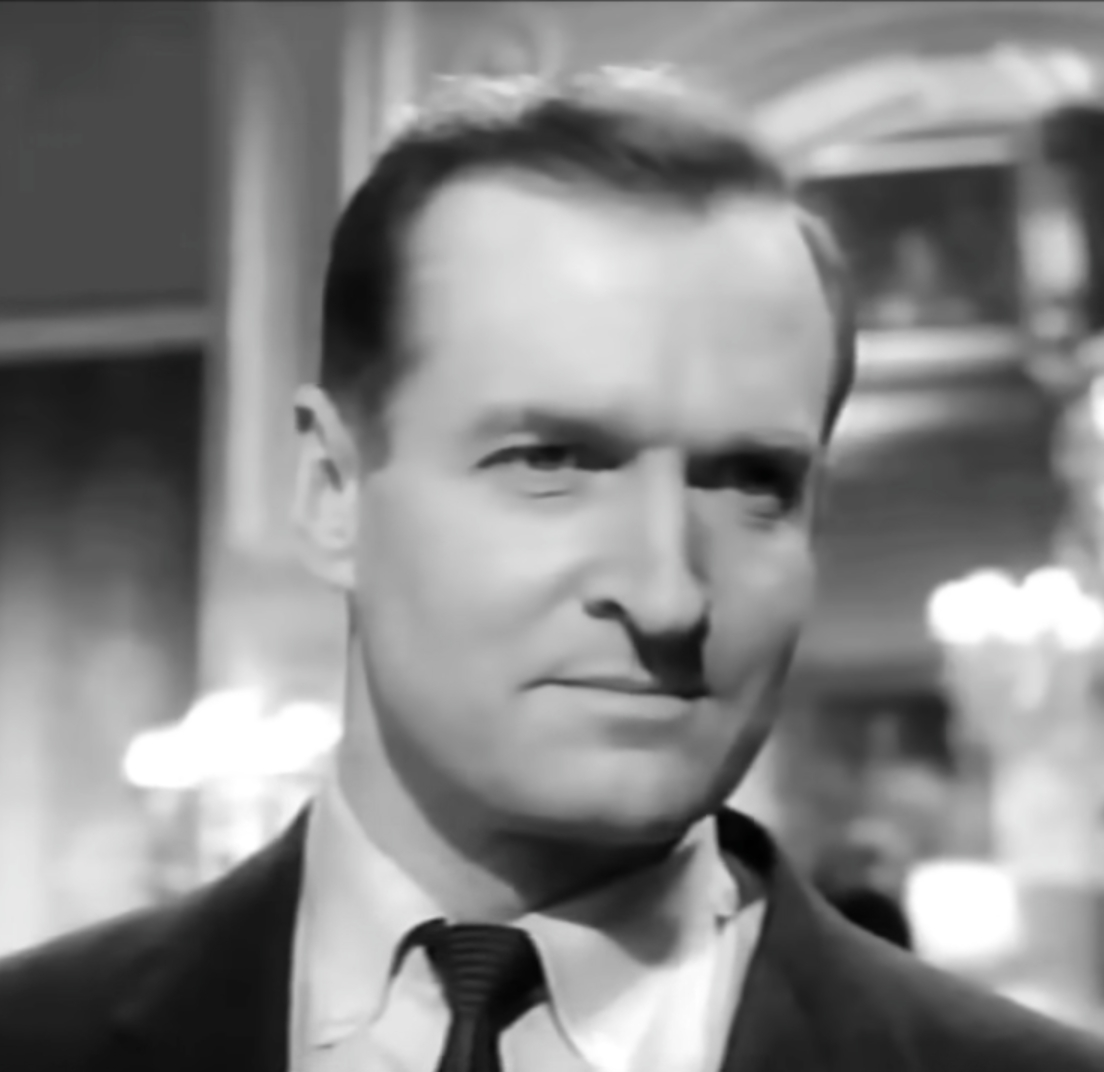
- Toone in the TV series One Step Beyond, episode The Villa, 1961
- Born: 15 November 1910; Dublin, Ireland
- Died: 1 June 2005 (aged 94); Northwood, London, England
- Occupation: Actor
- Years active: 1933–2002

Geoffrey Toone (15 November 1910 – 1 June 2005) was an English actor and former matinee idol. He was born in Ireland to English parents. Most of his film roles after the 1930s were in supporting parts, usually as authority figures, though he did play the lead character in the Hammer Films production The Terror of the Tongs in 1961.

== Early life ==
Born in Dublin, Ireland to English parents, he was educated at Charterhouse School and Christ's College, Cambridge. He served in the Royal Artillery during World War II, but was invalided out in 1942.

== Career ==
Toone's notable appearances include:

- As Sir Edward Ramsay in the musical film The King and I (he dances with Deborah Kerr in the banquet sequence, much to the annoyance of the King).
- As retired boxer and pimp Denny Lipp in "Jeff", a noteworthy 1960 episode of the TV series The Westerner, produced, directed and co-written by Sam Peckinpah. The episode also featured in a small role Warren Oates, who became a Peckinpah stalwart.
- The BBC science fiction television series Doctor Who:
  - As Temmosus in the film of Dr. Who and the Daleks (1965)
  - As Hepesh in the television story The Curse of Peladon in 1972.
- In Freewheelers as the Nazi officer Karl von Gelb who continually tries to avenge Germany's World War II defeat.
- As R. A. Crichton in "The Greasy Pole", a 1981 episode of Yes Minister.
- As Lord Ridgemere, owner of the stately home where Delboy and Rodney dropped a chandelier in the Only Fools and Horses episode, "A Touch of Glass".
- As Lord Bittlesham, a recurring character in the TV adaptation of P. G. Wodehouse's Jeeves and Wooster.

== Personal life ==
For many years Toone shared a house with his close friend, the actor Frank Middlemass. "To their general amusement", they were often mistaken to be lovers, but in fact were not.

== Death ==
Toone died from natural causes, aged 94, at Denville Hall in Northwood, London. At the time of his death, Toone was one of the last survivors of the Old Vic theatre company of the 1930s, having appeared alongside the likes of John Gielgud and Laurence Olivier in productions of Shakespeare. At the time, he was also the longest-lived actor to have appeared in Doctor Who.

== Selected filmography ==
- Queer Cargo (1938) .... Lieutenant Stocken
- Luck of the Navy (1938) .... Commander Clive Stanton
- Night Journey (1938) .... Johnny Carson
- Sword of Honour (1939) .... Bill Brown
- Poison Pen (1940) .... David
- An Englishman's Home (1940) .... Peter Templeton
- Hell Is Sold Out (1951) .... Swedish Consulate Clerk
- The Woman's Angle (1952) .... Count Cambia
- The Great Game (1953) .... Jack Bannerman
- The Man Between (1953) .... Martin Mallison
- Alfred Hitchcock Presents (1955) (Season 1 Episode 5: "Into Thin Air" a.k.a. "The Vanishing Lady") - Basil Farnham
- Captain Lightfoot (1955) .... Captain Hood
- Diane (1956) .... Duke of Savoy
- The King and I (1956) .... Sir Edward Ramsey
- Johnny Tremain (1957) .... Major Pitcairn
- Zero Hour! (1957) .... Dr. Baird
- Murder at Site 3 (1959) .... Sexton Blake
- Once More, with Feeling! (1960) .... Dr. Richard Hilliard
- The Entertainer (1960) .... Harold Hubbard
- The Terror of the Tongs (1961) .... Captain Jackson Sale
- Captain Sindbad (1963) .... Mohar
- Echo of Diana (1963) .... Colonel Justin
- Dr. Crippen (1963) .... Mr. Tobin
- Blaze of Glory (1963) .... Roche
- The River Line (1964) .... Julian
- Dr. Who and the Daleks (1965) .... Temmosus
- Lady Killers (1981) .... Brigadier Cecil Winbolt
- The Scarlet Pimpernel (1982) .... Marquis de St. Cyr
- The Stone Carriers (1982) .... Narrator
- Strangers and Brothers (1984) .... Sir Oulstone Lyall

=== Television ===
Year	Title	Role	Notes
1954	Sunday Night Theatre	Achilles	Series 5, Episode 38: "Troilus and Cressida"
1955	Studio 57	Nils Larsen	Season 2, Episode 7: "Win a Cigar"
1955	The United States Steel Hour	Dr. Parker	Season 3, Episode 12: “Edward My Son"
1956	The Loretta Young Show	Cookie	Season 3, Episode 26: "Gesundheit"
1956	Crusader	Vendron/Munro	Season 2, 2 Episodes
1956	Producers’ Showcase	Clyde Lockert	Season 2, Episode 10: "Dodsworth"
1956	Camera Three	King Arthur	Season 1, Episode 36: "The Deadly Riddle
1956	Playwrights '56	Robert Cartwright	Episode 18: "Keyhole"
1956	The Alcoa Hour	Treleaven/Leeds	Season 1 & 2, 2 Episodes
1956	Conflict	Captain Geoffrey Thorpe	Season 1, Episode 2: "Condemned to Glory"
1956	On Trial	Lenier	Season 1, Episode 5: "The De Santre Story"
1956-1957	Matinee Theater	Actor/Daniel/Dr. Howard Kemp	Season 1 & 2, 6 Episodes
1957	Cheyenne	Jim Harwick	Series 2, Episode 14: "Big Ghost Basin"
1957	Kraft Television Theatre	Actor	Season 10, Episode 42: "The First and the Last"
1958	Armchair Theatre	Benjamin Stratton	Series 2, Episode 30: "Miss Olive"
1958	Ivanhoe	Sir Maurice	Episode 31: "Three Days to Worcester"
1960	Tales of the Vikings	Krona/Jayson	2 Episodes
1960	Markham	Arthur Simms	Season 2, Episode 28: "The Snarled Web"
1960	On Trial	Thomas Poplett	Episode 9: "Governor Wall"
1960	Knight Errant Limited	John Dover	Series 3, Episode 2: "John Dover"
1960	The Westerner	Denny Lipp	Episode 1: "Jeff"
1960	The Odd Man	Steve Gardiner	Series 1, All 8 Episodes
1961	One Step Beyond	Jim Low	Season 3, Episode 32: "The Villa"
1961	Family Solicitor	Robert Allen	Episode 16: "In Custody"
1963	It Happened Like This	Solforth	Episode 4: "The Man with His Hand in His Pocket"
1963	Z-Cars	My Lord	Series 2, Episode 23: "The Main Chance”
1963	Zero One	Lawyer	Series 2, Episode 1: "The Golden Silence"
1963	Drama 61-67	Prosecuting Counsel	Series 3, Episode 15: "Drama '3: A Well Dressed Man"
1963	Emergency Ward 10	Sir William Isaacs	Series 1, Episode 624
1964	Play of the Week	Captain George Montagu	Series 9, Episode 20: "Acquit or Hang!"
1965	The Scales of Justice	Sir Joseph Kenton	Episode 7: "Personal and Confidential"
1965	Contract to Kill	Jacques Charlustin	Episodes 1-5
1965	199 Park Lane	Sergeant Baines	15 Episodes
1965	The Third Man	Paul Clarke	Series 4, Episode 2: "Members Only: Part 1"
1966	Death is a Good Living	Jim Prescott	All 4 Episodes
1968-1969	Freewheelers	Von Gelb	Series 1-3, 36 Episodes
1970	Codename	Karl Dickinson	Episode 11: "Appointment in Prague"
1971	The Troubleshooters	Sir Charles Bliss	Series 7, 3 Episodes
1971	The Persuaders!	The General	Episode 6: "The Time and the Place"
1972	Doctor Who	Hepesh	Series 9, Episodes 5-8: "The Curse of Peladon"
1972	New Scotland Yard	Sir Geoffrey Oxborough	Series 2, Episode 3: "A Gathering of Dust"
1972	Colditz	President of the Court	Series 1, Episode 11: "Court Martial"
1973	ITV Sunday Night Theatre	Von Ribbentrop	Series 5, Episode 14: "The Death of Adolf Hitler"
1973	A Little Princess	Mr Carmichael	Episodes 3-6
1973	Crown Court	Colonel G.H. Hore-Davis	Series 2, Episode 44-45: "Beware of the Dog"
1974	Fall of Eagles	Groener	Episodes 12-13
1974	Sutherland’s Law	Judge	Series 2, Episode 8: "The Evidence"
1974	Warship	General Tiering	Series 2, Episodes 1-2
1974	Microbes and Men	Von Gossler	Episode 5: "The Turberculin Affair"
1975	Churchill’s People	Lord Castlereagh	Episode 26: "Death of Liberty"
1976	The New Avengers	Minister	Series 1, Episode 8: "The Tale of the Big Why
1977	When the Boat Comes In	Chief Constable	Series 2, Episode 12: "In the Front Line You Get Shot At
1977	Anna Karenina	Prince Shcherbatsky	6 Episodes
1978	All Creatures Great and Small	Major General Ransom	Series 1, Episode 9: "The Last Furlong
1979	Thomas & Sarah	General	Episode 6: "Alma Mater"
1979	Citizen Smith	Sir Geoffrey Haydon	Series 3, Episode6: "The Party’s Over"
1981	Yes Minister	R A Crichton	Series 2, Episode 4: "The Greasy Pole"
1981	Winston Churchill: The Wilderness Years	Sir Louis Kershaw	Episodes 2-4
1982	Only Fools and Horses	Lord Ridgemere	Series 2, Episode 7: "A Touch of Grass"
1983	Number 10	Baron Rothschild	Episode 6: "Dizzy"
1983	The Consultant	Sir Neville Johnson	Episode 1: "Invitation to Tender"
1983	The Nation’s Health	Randolph Spence	Episodes 2-4
1988	War and Remembrance	British Ambassador	Part VII
1991	Parnell and the Englishwoman	O’Gorman Mahon	Episode 1: "The Meeting"
1991-1993	Jeeves and Wooster	Lord Bittlesham	Series 2, 3 & 4, 3 Episodes
1991	Casualty	Mr Bridges	Series 6, Episode 8: "Living in Hope"
1994-1995	The High Life	Earl Islay	2 Episodes
1994	Middlemarch	Sir Godwin Lydgate	Episodes 3-4
1997	The Apocalypse Watch	General Weigel	TV Movie (Final Role)
