= Biggles (TV series) =

- Genre: Adventure
- Country of origin: United Kingdom
- Original language: English
- No. of series: 1
- No. of episodes: 44

Production
- Running time: 30 minutes
- Production company: Granada Television

Original release
- Network: ITV
- Release: 1 April – 12 October 1960

Biggles is a 1960s television series based on the Biggles series of books by W.E. Johns. Neville Whiting played the title role.

== Plot ==
There were forty-four black and white episodes of thirty minutes (including adverts), which were made by Granada Television and ran from 1 April till 12 October 1960. Biggles was a detective air inspector attached to Scotland Yard. Helping him was Ginger (John Leyton) and Bertie (David Drummond), and they fought against villains like von Stalhein (Carl Duering). Aimed at a younger audience, each adventure ended in a cliff hanger with the viewers were told to tune in next week for more adventures.

== Cast ==
- Neville Whiting as James 'Biggles' Bigglesworth
- John Leyton as Ginger
- David Drummond as Bertie
- Carl Duering as von Stalhein
- Bill Croasdale as Guide/Purser
- Arthur Lovegrove as Ernie Pybus
- Barry Shawzin as Cordera
- Peter Madden as Hara
- Walter Gotell as Ronbach
- Francis Matthews as Captain Haziri
- Roger Delgado as Dr. Ahmed Zakar
- William Mervyn as Alan Harding
- Norman Bowler as Ian Manton
- Jerold Wells as Brooks
- Robert Ayres as General Meeker
- Lloyd Lamble as General Bassett
- Richard Shaw as Kurt Johannis
- Harold Goldblatt as Colonel Ford

== Episodes ==
#	Episode Title	Aired
1	Biggles at the Home Front: Part 1	1 April 1960
2	Biggles at the Home Front: Part 2	8 April 1960
3	Biggles at the Home Front: Part 3	15 April 1960
4	Biggles Flies North: Part 1	22 April 1960
5	Biggles Flies North: Part 2	29 April 1960
6	Biggles Flies North: Part 3	6 May 1960
7	Biggles Flies North: Part 4	13 May 1960
8	Biggles Flies North: Part 5	20 May 1960
9	Biggles Follows On: Part 1	27 May 1960
10	Biggles Follows On: Part 2	3 June 1960
11	Biggles Follows On: Part 3	10 June 1960
12	Biggles Follows On: Part 4	17 June 1960
13	Biggles Follows On: Part 5	24 June 1960
14	Biggles Follows On: Part 6	29 June 1960
15	Biggles Takes Charge: Part 1	1 July 1960
16	Biggles Takes Charge: Part 2	6 July 1960
17	Biggles Takes Charge: Part 3	8 July 1960
18	Biggles Takes Charge: Part 4	13 July 1960
19	Biggles Takes Charge: Part 5	15 July 1960
20	Biggles Takes Charge: Part 6	20 July 1960
21	Biggles on Mystery Island: Part 1	22 July 1960
22	Biggles on Mystery Island: Part 2	27 July 1960
23	Biggles on Mystery Island: Part 3	29 July 1960
24	Biggles Baits the Trap: Part 1	3 August 1960
25	Biggles Baits the Trap: Part 2	5 August 1960
26	Biggles Baits the Trap: Part 3	10 August 1960
27	Biggles Baits the Trap: Part 4	12 August 1960
28	Biggles Baits the Trap: Part 5	17 August 1960
29	Biggles Baits the Trap: Part 6	19 August 1960
30	Biggles at World's End: Part 1	24 August 1960
31	Biggles at World's End: Part 2	26 August 1960
32	Biggles at World's End: Part 3	31 August 1960
33	Biggles Turns the Scale: Part 1	2 September 1960
34	Biggles Turns the Scale: Part 2	7 September 1960
35	Biggles Turns the Scale: Part 3	9 September 1960
36	Biggles Springs the Lock: Part 1	14 September 1960
37	Biggles Springs the Lock: Part 2	16 September 1960
38	Biggles Springs the Lock: Part 3	21 September 1960
39	Biggles in the East: Part 1	23 September 1960
40	Biggles in the East: Part 2	28 September 1960
41	Biggles in the East: Part 3	30 September 1960
42	Biggles on the Nile: Part 1	5 October 1960
43	Biggles on the Nile: Part 2	7 October 1960
44	Biggles on the Nile: Part 3	12 October 1960
