= The Luck of the Navy (film) =

1927 film directed by Fred Paul

- Directed by: Fred Paul
- Based on: The Luck of the Navy by Clifford Mills
- Produced by: Rudolph Salomon
- Starring: Evelyn Laye; Henry Victor; Hayford Hobbs; Norma Whalley
- Cinematography: Claude L. McDonnell
- Production company: Graham-Wilcox Productions
- Distributed by: Graham-Wilcox Productions
- Release date: November 1927
- Running time: 8,000 feet
- Country: United Kingdom
- Language: English

The Luck of the Navy is a 1927 British silent comedy thriller film directed by Fred Paul and starring Evelyn Laye, Henry Victor and Hayford Hobbs. It was an adaptation of the 1919 play The Luck of the Navy by Mrs Clifford Mills. It was shot at Cricklewood Studios.

== Cast ==
- Evelyn Laye as Cynthia Eden
- Henry Victor as Lieutenant Clive Stanton
- Hayford Hobbs as Louis Peel
- Robert Cunningham as Admiral Maybridge
- Norma Whalley as Mrs Peel
- H. Agar Lyons as Colonel Dupont
- William Freshman as Wing Eden
- Basil Griffen as Anna
- Zoe Palmer as Dora Green
- H. Saxon-Snell as Francois
- Douglas Herald as Joe Briggs
- Wally Patch as Stoker Clark
- Burton Craig as Lord Nelson
- Joan Langford Reed as Dora - Child

== Bibliography ==
- Low, Rachael. History of the British Film, 1918-1929. George Allen & Unwin, 1971.
- Wood, Linda. British Films, 1927-1939. British Film Institute, 1986.
