= Clifford Mills =

British playwright

Clifford Mills (aka Emlie Clifford, née Bennet) (1863–1933) was a British playwright, best known for the plays Where the Rainbow Ends and The Luck of the Navy.

== Career ==
Mills's real name was Emlie (aka Emilie) Clifford. She adopted the pseudonym Clifford Mills because, as a woman writer, she was unable to get published under her own name. Clifford Mills was derived from her husband's name Harold Mills Clifford, whom she married in 1889.

The inspiration for the fairy story play Where the Rainbow Ends came from a poem written by her daughter Evelyn. The play was co-authored with John Ramsay with music by Roger Quilter. Ramsay did not contribute to the content of the play but helped with the technical aspects of playwrighting. It was first staged in December 1911 and was presented at Christmas time from then until 1959, only missing two years. Where the Rainbow Ends was also published as a book in 1912.

Mills wrote seven plays including the comedy The Basker and The Luck of the Navy a spy story which was turned into a film in 1927. The Luck of the Navy was first performed in 1918 but continued to be performed post-war in London and by touring companies. Between 1919 and 1930 it was performed over 900 times in 148 theatres. It was also performed internationally: in Adelaide in 1920, Sydney in 1928 and Wellington in 1920. In Nelson's Days was a romantic historical drama.

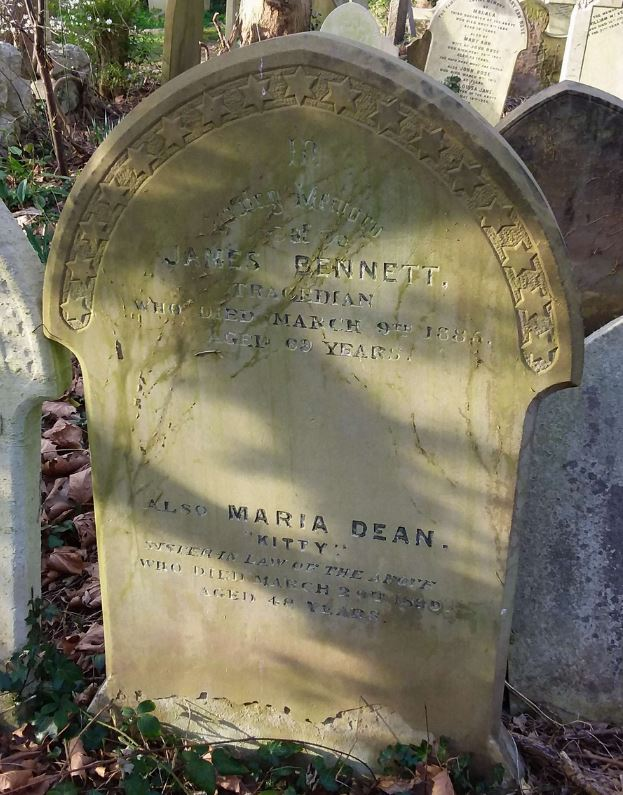
Grave of Clifford Mills in Highgate Cemetery

Evelyn Shillington (d. 1981), Mills's daughter, kept diaries of her life as a military wife during World War II; they were published as Eve's War.

Mills died on 2 July 1933 in London and is buried in Highgate cemetery.

== Selected works ==
=== Plays ===
- One of these Little Ones (1909)
- Where the Rainbow Ends (1911)
- The Basker (1916)
- The Luck of the Navy (1918)
- Virginia (1921)
- In Nelson's Days (1922)
- The Man from Hong Kong (1925)

=== Books ===
- Where the Rainbow Ends (1912)
