= Roger Quilter =

English composer (1877–1953)

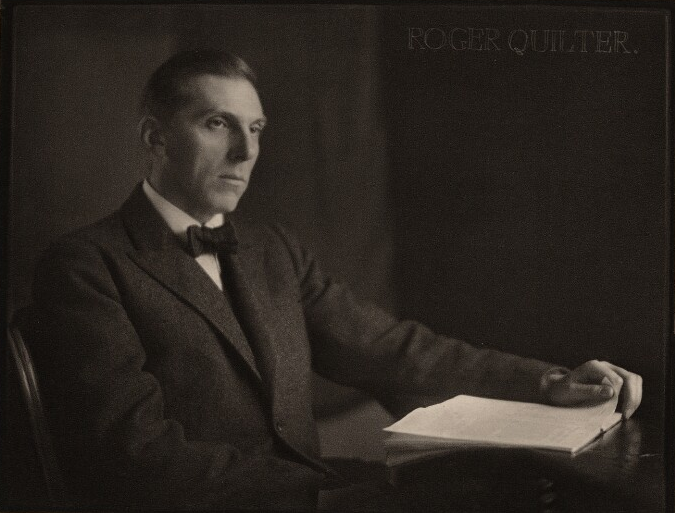
Roger Quilter c. 1922

Roger Cuthbert Quilter (1 November 1877 – 21 September 1953) was a British composer, known particularly for his art songs. His songs, which number over a hundred, often set music to text by William Shakespeare and are a mainstay of the English art song tradition.

== Biography ==
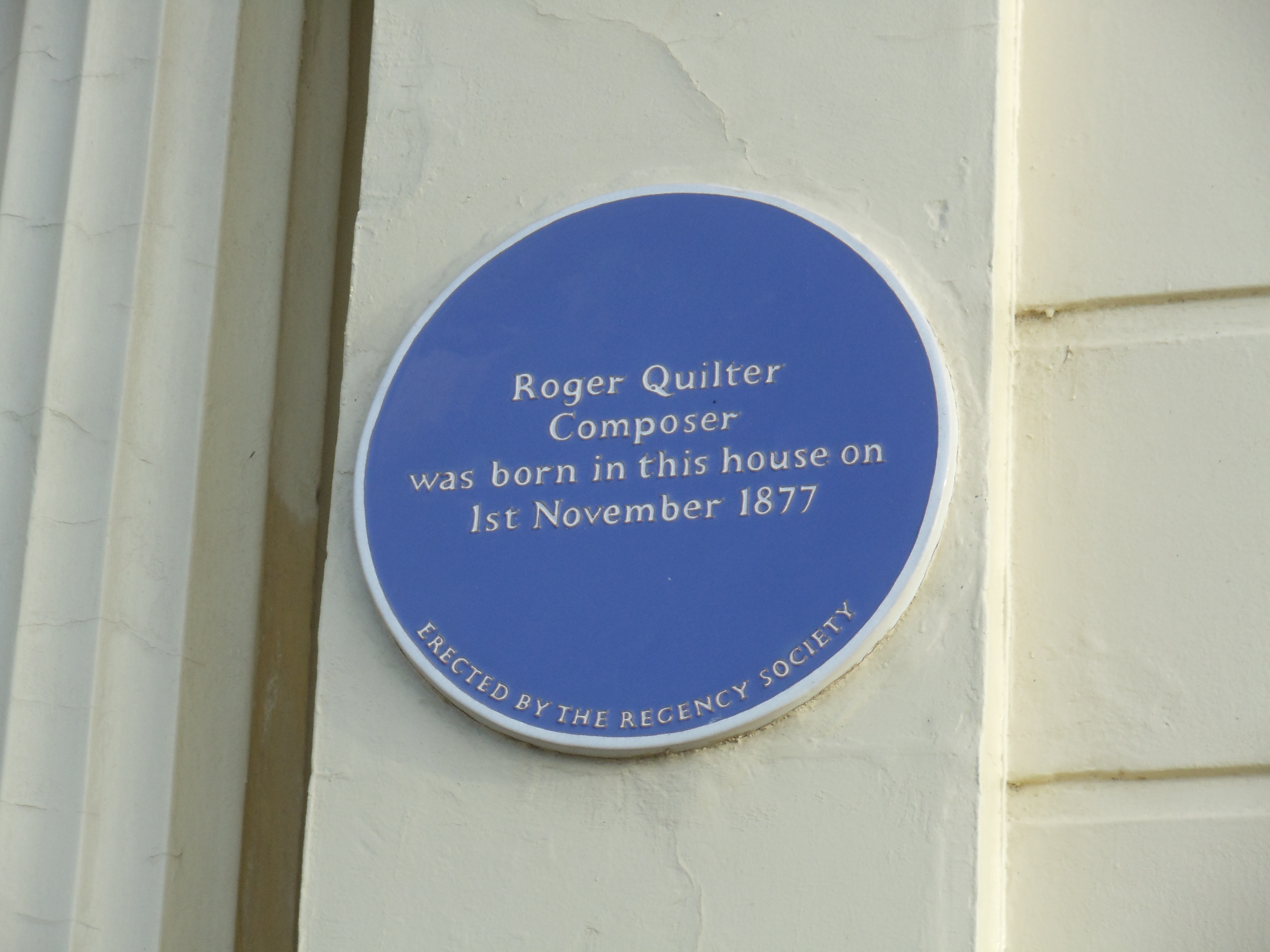
Blue plaque for Roger Quilter in Hove

Quilter was born in Hove, Sussex; a commemorative blue plaque is on the house at 4 Brunswick Square. He was a younger son of Sir William Quilter, 1st Baronet, a wealthy noted landowner, politician and art collector.

Roger Quilter was educated first in the preparatory school at Farnborough. He then moved to Eton College and later became a fellow-student of Percy Grainger, Cyril Scott and H. Balfour Gardiner at the Hoch Conservatory in Frankfurt, where he studied for almost five years under the guidance of the German professor of composition Iwan Knorr. Quilter belonged to the Frankfurt Group, a circle of composers who studied at the Hoch Conservatory in the late 1890s.

His reputation in England rests largely on his songs and on his light music for band trios, such as his Children's Overture, with its interwoven nursery rhyme tunes, and a suite of music for the play Where the Rainbow Ends. He is noted as an influence on several English composers, including Peter Warlock.

Quilter enjoyed a fruitful collaboration with the tenor Gervase Elwes until the latter's death in 1921. In November 1936, Quilter's opera Julia was presented at Covent Garden by the British Music Drama Opera Company under the direction of Vladimir Rosing. It ran for only seven performances. Heavily revised, it was later published as Love at the Inn.

As a gay man during the late 19th century, it was difficult to cope with the pressures that were imposed upon him by his hidden homosexuality, and he struggled with mental illness after the loss of his nephew Arnold Guy Vivian during World War II.

He died at his home on 21 September 1953, in St John's Wood, London, a few months after celebrations to mark his 75th birthday, and was buried in the family vault at St Mary's Church, Bawdsey, Suffolk.

== Songs ==
Roger Quilter's output of songs, more than one hundred in total, added to the canon of English art song that is still sung today. According to Valerie Langfield, his style "was indisputably English" despite his German training, and once matured around 1905, did not develop further. Shakespeare, Herrick, and Shelley were his favoured poets. Among the most popular are "Love's Philosophy", "Fair House of Joy", "Come Away Death", "Go, Lovely Rose", "Weep You No More", "By the Sea", and his setting of O Mistress Mine. Quilter's setting of verses from the Tennyson poem "Now Sleeps the Crimson Petal" is one of his earliest songs but is nonetheless characteristic of the later, mature style.

Of his seventeen Shakespeare settings, the Three Shakespeare Songs (1905, revised 1906) are perhaps the most successful: commenting on O Mistress Mine Peter Warlock said the song is "one of the very few things that very simply send me into ecstasies every time I play it". While a collection rather than a true song cycle, Seven Elizabethan Lyrics is "probably the best single volume of songs the composer ever produced", according to Michael Pilkington, and includes the still regularly performed "Fair House of Joy" as its final song.

But perhaps his most widely known work is Non Nobis, Domine (1934). This was written for the Pageant of Parliament at the Royal Albert Hall July 1934, to a text by Rudyard Kipling, and has become the school song or school hymn of many girls' schools in the English-speaking world. He also published the Arnold Book of Old Songs, a collection of 16 folk and traditional songs from England, Ireland, Scotland, Wales and France to new accompaniments, dedicated to his nephew Arnold Guy Vivian.

=== Recordings ===
Recorded collections of Quilter songs include discs by Benjamin Luxon and David Willison, Charlotte de Rothschild and Adrian Farmer, and James Gilchrist and Anna Tilbrook. Mark Stone and Stephen Barlow have issued a four disc set of the complete songs. There are also collections of the folk song arrangements and part songs for women's voices. David Owen Norris has recorded the solo piano music.

== Selected works ==
By date of composition, not publication:

- Four Songs of the Sea, Op. 1 (1901) (revised, and omitting first song, as Three Songs of the Sea) (1911)
- Four Songs of Mirza Schaffy Op. 2 (1903) (revised 1911)
- Three Shakespeare Songs, Op. 6 (1905)
- To Julia, Op. 8 (texts of Robert Herrick) (1905)
- Seven Elizabethan Lyrics, Op. 12 (1908)
- Three English Dances, Op. 11 (1910)
- Three Studies for Piano, Op. 4 (1910)
- Where the Rainbow Ends (incidental music) (1911)
- Four Child Songs, Op. 5 (1914) (revised 1945)
- A Children's Overture (1914)
- Three Pastoral Songs, Op. 22 (1920)
- Five Shakespeare Songs, Op. 23 (1921)
- The Fuchsia Tree, Op. 25, No. 2 (1923)
- Five Jacobean Lyrics, Op. 28 (1926)
- Five English Love Lyrics, Op. 24 (1922–28)
- Four Shakespeare Songs, Op. 30 (1933)
- Julia, light opera (1936) (includes the concert waltz "Rosme" and the gavotte "In Georgian Days"). Revised as Love at the Inn (1940)
- Arnold Book of Old Songs (1921, 1942, pub. 1950)
