= Evening Hymn =

1908 composition by H. Balfour Gardiner

Evening Hymn Te lucis ante terminum
- Anthem by H. Balfour Gardiner
- English: Thee, Lord, before the close of day
- Key: D major
- Text: Compline hymn "Te lucis ante terminum"
- Language: English; Latin
- Dedication: E. T. Sweeting
- Published: 1908:
- Scoring: SATB choir and organ

Evening Hymn, "Te lucis ante terminum" ("Thee, Lord, before the close of day"), is an anthem composed by Henry Balfour Gardiner, a setting of the Latin compline hymn "Te lucis ante terminum" for four voices and organ, in both English and Latin. It was published in 1908. It is regarded as Gardiner's best-known work and a classic of the English choral tradition.

== History ==
Gardiner had studied at Dr. Hoch's Konservatorium in Frankfurt, composition with Iwan Knorr and piano with Lazzaro Uzielli, at the same time as Percy Grainger, Roger Quilter, Norman O'Neill and Cyril Scott. He composed the anthem in 1907 when he worked on the staff of Winchester College for one term where Edward Thomas Sweeting (1863–1930) was Music Master and College Organist. Gardiner's biographer Stephen Lloyd notes that the anthem had been on his mind for years although he was no longer religious. The possibility to have it performed probably spurred the completion of the composition.

Gardiner set the anthem in D major for four voices, sometimes divided, and organ, writing the same music for both an English text and the Latin version by Pope Urban VIII. Gardiner, a self-critical composer, destroyed many of his works, including symphonies, but not this anthem. The anthem is the only work that reflects his organ studies, providing a substantial organ part. He dedicated it to Sweeting. It was published in 1908 by Novello, while Carus-Verlag published it in 2004.

== Text and music ==
The Latin text is Pope Urban VIII’s alternate version of the compline hymn "Te lucis ante terminum" from the Roman Breviary. Gardiner set the three stanzas differently, with long organ prelude and interludes, following the mood of the text. The second stanza is written for unaccompanied voices. An introduction by the organ builds to a powerful entry of the choir, marked "full voice, even tone". The second stanza, reflecting the night's frightening fantasies, has been described as "hushed". The third stanza returns to the melody of the first, but in slightly different harmonies. The concluding Amen begins with a powerful entry of the alto, followed by imitation in the other voices, leading to a restful ending in low register and very softly.

Evening Hymn, called a "noble" anthem, is regarded as Gardiner's best-known work and a classic of the English choral tradition, often sung at evensong. William McVicker summarizes: "The long, seamless phrases, carefully written dynamic changes and effective use of harmonies, have made this piece a favourite in any parish choir's repertory."
