= H. Balfour Gardiner =

British conductor (1877-1950)

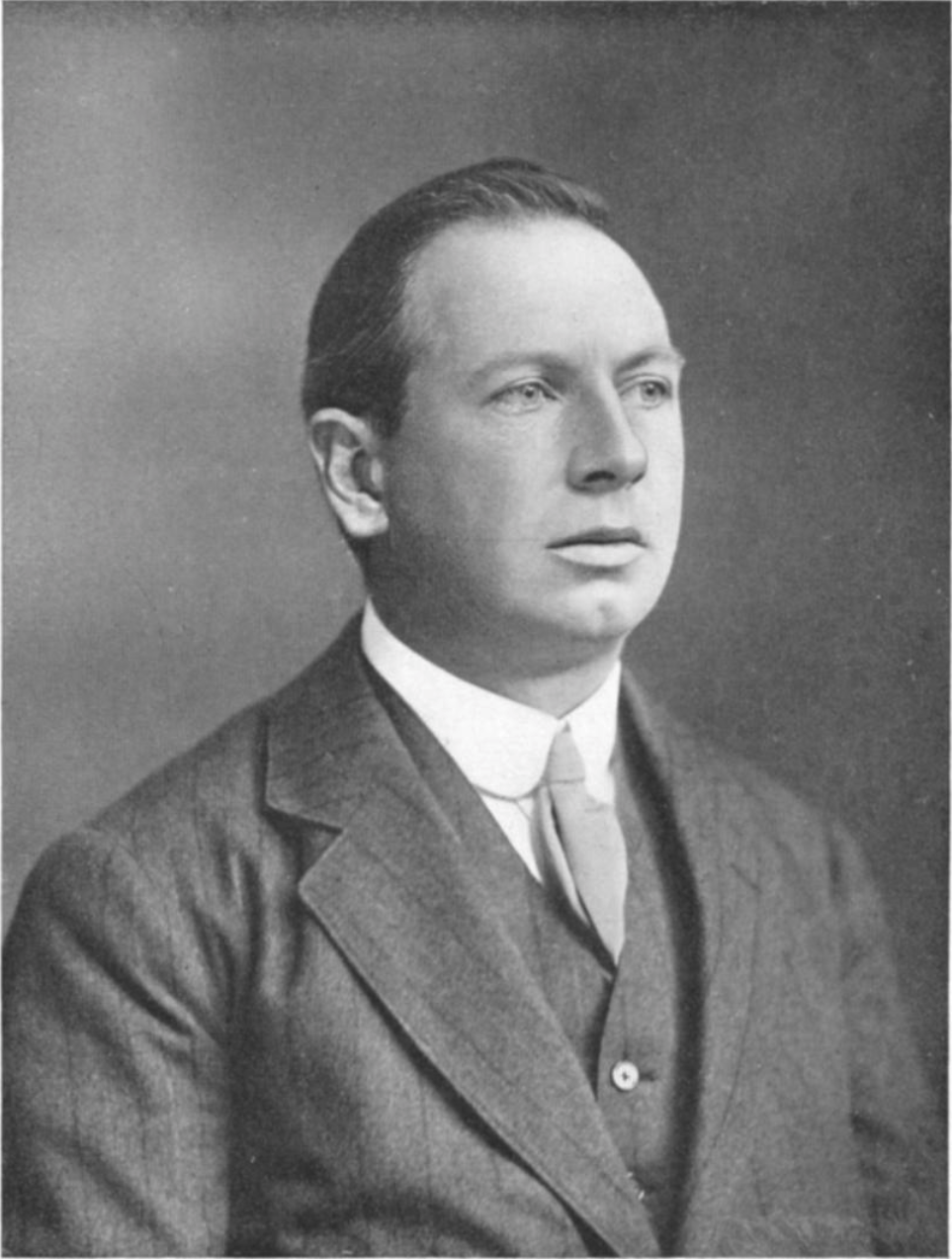
- Born: Henry Balfour Gardiner; 7 November 1877; Kensington, England
- Died: 28 June 1950 (aged 72); Salisbury, England
- Education: New College, Oxford; Hoch Conservatory
- Occupations: Composer; Music pedagogue
- Relatives: Alan Gardiner (brother); John Eliot Gardiner (grandnephew)

Signature
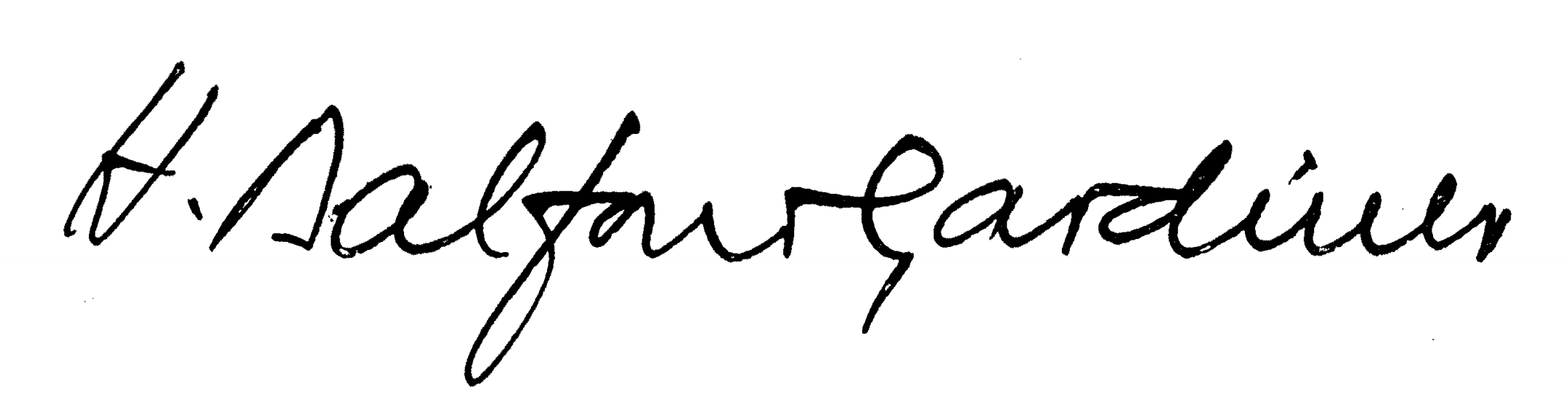

Henry Balfour Gardiner (7 November 1877 – 28 June 1950) was a British musician, composer, and teacher. He was the son of Henry John Gardiner, a successful entrepreneur who made a considerable fortune in the drapery wholesale business in Bristol and London.

== Education ==
He was born at 6, Orsett Terrace, Westbourne Grove, Paddington, London. He began to play the piano at the age of 5 and to compose at 9. Between his conventional education at Charterhouse School and New College, Oxford, where he obtained only a pass degree, Gardiner was a piano student at the Hoch Conservatory in Frankfurt, where he was taught by Iwan Knorr and Lazzaro Uzielli, who had been a pupil of Clara Schumann. He belonged to the Frankfurt Group, a circle of composers who studied at the Hoch Conservatory in the late 1890s. With George Gardiner (no relation) he collected folk songs in Hampshire (1905–1906), taught music briefly at Winchester College (1907), and composed.

== Composition ==
His works included compositions in a variety of genres, including two symphonies (No 2 premiered at the Proms in 1908), but many of his scores, including the symphonies, are lost and only a very limited amount of his music survives.

His best-known work Evening Hymn (1908), a setting of the compline hymn "Te lucis ante terminum", is a lush, romantic work for eight-part choir and organ, of dense harmonies. For most of the time, it sits in four parts, though the treble, alto, tenor, and bass parts all subdivide at various points. It is considered a classic of the English choral repertoire and is still regularly performed as an anthem at Evensong in Anglican churches.

The fame of this work has overshadowed his surviving orchestral works, which include Overture to a Comedy (1906, revised 1911), the Percy Grainger-like Shepherd Fennell's Dance (1911) (once a favourite at the Proms, chalking up 35 performances between 1911 and 1951), and the Delius-like A Berkshire Idyll, the latter written in 1913 at Field House, Ashampstead Green in Berkshire, where he lived between 1911 and 1930. The first performance of the Idyll (along with two other unpublished pieces, Philomela and the choral setting April), took place on 6 May 1955 at the Royal Festival Hall, 42 years after its completion. It was recorded in 2017 for the first time.

Also surviving are a number of short piano works and songs. There is also the one movement String Quartet in Bb major, composed in 1905 and premiered that year on 28 February by the Cathie String Quartet at the Aeolian Hall. It has been recorded by the Tippett Quartet.

== Promoter of contemporary music ==
Gardiner's most important work, possibly, was his promotion of the music of contemporary British and colonial composers, particularly through a series of concerts he personally financed at Queen's Hall London in 1912 to 1913. The composers represented included Arnold Bax, Frederic Austin, Gustav Holst, Percy Grainger, Roger Quilter, Cyril Scott and Norman O'Neill. (The last four had also studied with him at Frankfurt.) Gardiner was very generous with his personal fortune, paying for a private benefit performance of The Planets for Holst in 1918 and purchasing Frederick Delius's house at Grez-sur-Loing to enable him to continue living in it at the end of his life. In the early 1920s he also became a patron of Charles Kennedy Scott, conductor and founder of the Philharmonic Choir which was the predecessor of the present London Philharmonic Choir.

== Final years ==
Gardiner gave up composing in 1925 largely because he was intensely self-critical: much of his lost music was probably destroyed by him. For the next 25 years he devoted himself to a pioneering afforestation programme on his Dorset pig farm. He died in hospital in Salisbury after suffering a stroke.

== See also ==
- Alan Gardiner, an Egyptologist
- John Eliot Gardiner, a conductor
