= 1903 in British music =

This is a summary of 1903 in music in the United Kingdom.

== Events ==
- 8 January - The first performances of Charles Villiers Stanford‘s Four Sonnets from ‘The Triumph of Love’, and his Allegro vivace in G for piano trio are given at St James's Hall, London.
- 15 January - The first performance of Arthur Hinton‘s Suite in D for Violin and Piano is given by Maud Powell and Katharine Goodson.
- 29 January - The first performance of Charles Villiers Stanford‘s Clarinet Concerto in A minor takes place in Bournemouth with Charles Draper as soloist, conducted by the composer.
- 30 January -The first performances of the Sonata for Piano by the London resident Italian composer Alberto Randegger, and Hubert Parry‘s sixth set of English Lyrics (6th Set), are given at St James’ Hall.
- 12 February - Cyril Scott performs in his own Quartet for Piano and Strings at a Broadwood Concert in St James's Hall, London; the other three parts are played by Fritz Kreisler, Emil Kreuz and Ludwig Lebell.
- 26 February - The first performance of Donald Tovey’s Trio for Pianoforte, Violin, and Cor Anglais is given by Tovey, Haydn Wood and Edgar Horton at St James’ Hall.
- 12 March - Frédéric Alfred d'Erlanger‘s Violin Concerto, op 17 is played by Fritz Kreisler at a Philharmonic Concert.
- 6 June - Edward Elgar's Dream of Gerontius is finally given its London premiere at Westminster Cathedral, three years after its troubled premiere in Birmingham. By then it had been heard twice in Germany and twice in America. Arthur Johnstone's favourable reviews in The Guardian are generally credited with increasing its popularity.
- 25 August - The Second Symphony by Cyril Scott is performed for the first time in London at the Proms in London. It was subsequently adapted as the Three Symphonic Dances.
- 9 September - Samuel Coleridge-Taylor conducts the first performance of his sacred cantata The Atonement at the Three Choirs Festival in Hereford.
- 14 October - The Apostles, an oratorio by Edward Elgar, is performed for the first time at the Birmingham Festival.
- 4 November - The Piano Concerto in A major, op. 15 by Donald Tovey is performed for the first time by the Queen’s Hall Orchestra, conducted by Sir Henry Wood, with Tovey as the soloist.
- date unknown
  - Edward Elgar buys Royal Sunbeam bicycles for himself and his wife; he names his bicycle "Mr Phoebus".
  - Arthur Wood becomes musical director of Terry's Theatre in London and is the city's youngest musical director at 28.
  - Alexander Mackenzie makes a tour of Canada, organised by Charles A.E. Harriss.
  - Cecil Sharp begins collecting folk songs.

== Publications ==
- Henry Saxe Wyndham – Arthur Seymour Sullivan, 1842-1900

== Popular music ==
- "Little Yellow Bird", with words by William Hargreaves and music by Clarence Wainwright Murphy
- "Spring, Sweet Spring", with words by Stanislaus Stange and music by Julian Edwards

== Classical music: new works ==
- Edward Elgar – The Apostles (oratorio)
- Joseph Parry – "Dear Wife"

== Opera ==
- Edward German – A Princess of Kensington, with libretto by Basil Hood

== Musical theatre ==
- 9 May – The School Girl, with book by Henry Hamilton and Paul M. Potter, music by Leslie Stuart and Paul Rubens, and lyrics by Charles H. Taylor, opens at the Prince of Wales Theatre, where it runs for 333 performances.
- 16 May – Will Marion Cook’s African-American revue In Dahomey opens at London’s Shaftesbury Theatre.
- 21 December – The Cherry Girl, with a book by Seymour Hicks, lyrics by Aubrey Hopwood and music by Ivan Caryll, opens at the Vaudeville Theatre; it runs until August 1904, when it goes on tour.

== Births ==
- 18 January – Gladys Hooper, née Nash, pianist (died 2016)
- 22 January – Robin Milford, composer and educator (d. 1959)
- 8 March – Avril Coleridge-Taylor, pianist, conductor and composer (died 1998)
- 12 May – Lennox Berkeley, composer (d. 1989)
- 26 June – Margaret More, composer (died 1966)
- 23 August – William Primrose, violist (died 1982)
- 2 September – Fred Pratt Green, Methodist minister and hymn writer (died 2000)
- 29 October – Vivian Ellis, composer and lyricist (died 1996)
- 31 October – Eric Ball, composer, arranger and conductor of brass band music (died 1989)
- 17 December – Ray Noble, bandleader, composer and arranger (d. 1978)
- date unknown – Leo Maguire, singer, songwriter and radio broadcaster (died 1985)

== Deaths ==
- 17 February – Joseph Parry, organist and composer, 61
- June – Constance Bache, pianist, composer and music teacher, 57
- 26 October – Herbert Oakeley, composer, 73

== See also ==
- 1903 in the United Kingdom
