= Frankfurt Group =

Composition school

The Frankfurt Group, also called the Frankfort Group, the Frankfurt Gang or the Frankfurt Five, was a group of English-speaking composers and friends who studied composition under Iwan Knorr at the Hoch Conservatory in Frankfurt am Main in the late 1890s. The group included H. Balfour Gardiner, Norman O'Neill, Cyril Scott and Roger Quilter, who were all English, and Percy Grainger, who was born in Australia and established himself as a composer in England between 1901 and 1914 before moving to the United States. They remained close friends from their student days onwards.

== Leipzig predecessors ==
An older generation of British composers and performers had studied at the Leipzig Conservertoire. These included Arthur Sullivan, Edward Dannreuther, Charles Swinnerton Heap, Frederic Cowen, Charles Villiers Stanford, Dame Ethel Smyth, Walter Battison Haynes and (the youngest and most influential on the Frankfurt Group) Frederick "Fritz" Delius. The primary influences at Leipzig were Brahms and Carl Reinecke, and the emphasis was on technical mastery of counterpoint, fugue and orchestration. The influence on (as well as resistance to) the German tradition was a key factor in the development of the English Musical Renaissance.

== Iwan Knorr ==
Knorr, though German-born, was strongly influenced by Russian music and was a believer in fostering the individuality of his pupils. The Frankfurt group were united more by their friendship and their non-conformity than by any common aim, though they did share a dislike of Beethoven, and a resistance to the musical nationalism of the self-styled English Musical Renaissance of Hubert Parry and Charles Villiers Stanford, and of the later English Pastoral School of Ralph Vaughan Williams and Gustav Holst. All of them had a predilection for the music of Frederick Delius, although there remains some doubt as to when the individual members first became aware of his music, which was certainly later than when they were a group in the 1890s. The group was distinguished by its rebelliousness, and by studying abroad they stood apart from the conservative wider English musical establishment.

Grainger described the group as Pre-Raphaelite composers, arguing that they were musically distinguished from other British composers by "an excessive emotionality ... particularly a tragic or sentimental or wistful or pathetic emotionality", reached through a focus on chords rather than musical architecture or "the truly English qualities of grandeur, hopefulness and glory". Most rebellious were Grainger and Scott, whose music often crossed the boundaries of accepted musical convention. Scott's work for a time gave up the use of bars and time signatures, while employing dissonant harmonies and highly individual orchestration. The music of Quilter, O'Neill and (sometimes) Balfour Gardiner, shows an influence derived from Delius.

== Other British musicians in Frankfurt ==
Other British composers and musicians who studied in Frankfurt but were not part of the Frankfurt Group include Algernon Ashton, a traditionalist who studied at the Hoch Conservatory earlier than the main group, under its first director Joachim Raff. Raff employed Clara Schumann among the teachers, and established a class specifically for female composers. The British pianists Leonard Borwick and Fanny Davies were among Clara Schumann's pupils in Frankfurt. Composer and pianist Adelina de Lara studied there with Schumann and Iwan Knorr, as did Amina Goodwin, Mathilde Verne and her sister Mary Wurm. Other composers who studied there included John David Davis (with Hans von Bülow at his summer masterclasses), Frederick Septimus Kelly and William Beatton Moonie.

== Legacy ==
Writing in 1977 Stephen Banfield argued that "today [the Frankfurt Group] is difficult to regard as anything other than a damp squib in the history of English music". Of them all, he said, only Roger Quilter is remembered not as a name but for his music - although only his songs have made an impact.

== Literature ==
- Peter Cahn, Das Hoch'sche Konservatorium in Frankfurt am Main (1878–1978), Frankfurt am Main: Kramer, 1979. p. 140ff.
- Howes, Frank (1966). "Tributaries from Frankfurt, Birmingham and Elsewhere". The English Musical Renaissance. London: Secker & Warburg. pp. 192–202. OCLC 930472265.
- Langfield, Valerie (2002). Roger Quilter: His Life and Music. Woodbridge: Boydell & Brewer. ISBN 0-85115-871-4.
- Lloyd, Stephen (2005). H. Balfour Gardiner. Cambridge: Cambridge University Press. ISBN 0-521-61922-X.
