= Gorie (surname) =

Gorie is a surname. Notable people with the surname include:

- Dominic L. Pudwill Gorie (born 1957), American Navy officer and astronaut
- Ola Gorie (born 1937), Scottish jewellery designer
