= Norman O'Neill =

Norman O'Neill may refer to:

- Norm O'Neill (1937–2008), Australian cricketer
- Norman O'Neill (composer) (1875–1934), English composer
