= Sylvia Wishart =

Scottish landscape artist

- Wishart, from a 2008 obituary
- Born: 11 February 1936; Stromness, Orkney, Scotland
- Died: 4 December 2008 (aged 72)
- Education: Gray's School of Art

Sylvia Wishart FRSA (11 February 1936 – 4 December 2008) was a Scottish landscape artist.

== Early life ==
Wishart was born and raised in Stromness, Orkney. She grew up as a neighbour to poet George Mackay Brown (1921–1996).

== Career ==
Wishart worked in the post office, but painted as a hobby. She was eventually persuaded to train at Gray's School of Art in Aberdeen, where she shared a flat with fellow Orcadian, jewellery designer Ola Gorie. From 1969 to 1987 she taught painting and drawing at Gray's. Her drawings illustrated George Mackay Brown's An Orkney Tapestry, published in 1969.

In 2005, Wishart was made a full member of the Royal Scottish Academy. In 1992, 2007 and 2011, the Pier Art Centre in Orkney held shows of her works.

Many of her paintings and drawings depicted landscapes and seascapes in Orkney, especially views of Hoy Sound from her cottage window. Later works incorporate mixed media techniques. Artists' patron Margaret Gardiner was a friend.

== Personal life and legacy ==
Wishart and Brown had a long friendship involving frequent drinking, occasional violence, and Roman Catholicism (they converted together). She died in 2008, aged 72 years.

Works by Wishart are in the collections of Robert Gordon University, the Royal Scottish Academy, the Pier Arts Centre, the University of Leeds, the Scottish Maritime Museum, and other institutions. A book about Wishart, Sylvia Wishart: A Study, was published in 2012. Also in 2012, the Royal Scottish Academy held an exhibition of Wishart's works. A documentary film, Reflections – The Life and Art of Sylvia Wishart (2011), featured interviews with her colleagues and friends.
