= Lesley Foxcroft =

English sculptor

- Born: 1949; Sheffield, England
- Known for: Sculpture, installation art

Lesley Foxcroft (born 1949) is an English sculptor working mostly in MDF, paper, and card. She studied at the Camberwell School of Fine Art during 1970–1974 and has gone on to be part of several solo and group exhibitions.

== Style ==
Many of her works consist of pieces of MDF, paper and over such "everyday objects" attached to the walls of the gallery space with simple fixings such as bolts and washers. Of her style she has said that “I like the idea that the uncomplicated has a purpose: that the material does not give a sculpture its value, it is the artist that does'."

== Select solo exhibitions ==
Foxcroft has held several solo exhibitions including the Galerie Konrad Fischer, Düsseldorf, the Museum of Modern Art, Oxford in 1975, A arte Invernizzi, Milan in 2002,

== Work on permanent display ==
Her piece "Stackwork" (1993) is part of the permanent collection at the Pier Arts Centre, in Orkney. It was donated to them by the Contemporary Art Society.
