= Hubert Giesen =

German pianist

Hubert Giesen (13 January 1898 – 11 February 1980) was a German pianist.

== Life and career ==
Born in Kornelimünster, Giesen came from an old family that had lived in Kornelimünster since the 17th century. He studied music at the Conservatory in Cologne and later at the Musikhochschule Stuttgart. His teachers were Fritz Busch, Lazzaro Uzielli in Cologne and Max von Pauer and Joseph Haas in Stuttgart. (In his autobiography there are 113 pages on Fritz and Adolf Busch in the keyword index).

After he had earned his reputation in the late 1920s as accompanist to the violinist Adolf Busch at concerts in Rome, Amsterdam, Berlin and New York, he travelled with Yehudi Menuhin for two years throughout Europe and America. Giesen has accompanied countless concerts of the violinists Fritz Kreisler and Erika Morini and was then partner of Leo Slezak, Julius Patzak, Sigrid Onégin, Erna Berger, Erna Sack and many other soloists of his time. In 1943 he married the opera and concert singer Ellinor Junker.

When Ferdinand Leitner became Kapellmeister of the Theater am Nollendorfplatz in Berlin in 1943, two of his singers, Karl Schmitt-Walter and Walther Ludwig, joined Giesen in Stuttgart, whom he accompanied in their recitals. They continued the tradition of German lieder singing and were then replaced by the next generation Dietrich Fischer-Dieskau, Hermann Prey and Fritz Wunderlich. He also accompanied Anneliese Rothenberger at the piano.

After 1945 he specialized in the accompaniment of song recitals, among others with Ernst Haefliger, but especially in the collaboration with the tenor Fritz Wunderlich. Giesen was not only a sensitive accompanist, but also the spiritual and artistic mentor of Wunderlich.

From 1943 to 1969 Giesen was professor at the State University of Music and Performing Arts Stuttgart. Among his students were Werner Hollweg, Edgar Keenon, Gerolf Scheder and Thomas Pfeiffer.

Giesen died in Leonberg at the age of 82.

== Literature ==
- Hubert Giesen on Munzinger-Archiv
- Hubert Giesen: Am Flügel Hubert Giesen. Fischer, Frankfurt, 1972 and 1982, ISBN 978-3-1002-5401-6.
- Hubert Giesen über Fritz Wunderlich – Auszug aus seiner Autobiographie
