= The Boy Who Saw True =

1953 book

- Author: Neville Spearman
- Publication date: 1953
- ISBN: 978-0-854-35493-1

The Boy Who Saw True (originally published by Neville Spearman, 1953, with an introduction, afterword and notes by Cyril Scott) is the allegedly true diary of a young Victorian boy with clairvoyant gifts. Born with unusual talents, the anonymous author could apparently see auras and spirits, yet failed to realise that other people were not similarly gifted. "In consequence he was misunderstood, and had to suffer many indignities."

Noted English composer Cyril Scott describes the diary in the book's introduction as "a highly diverting and important human document. The document is of interest in that it reveals the thoughts, emotions and perplexities of a Victorian youngster brought up a little prior to the 'naughty nineties' ... Before his death his wife persuaded him to let the diary be published. But he made certain stipulations. It was not to be printed until several years after his death. He allowed bad spellings to remain." Although the author remained anonymous, Scott says he was born in the North of England, his father being a businessman.

== Critical reception ==
Tutor Hunt wrote, "the diary is endearing and gently humorous so that readers cannot help but side with its deeply sensitive young protagonist. With the boy we laugh at the adults around him for all their various embarrassments and hypocrisies. From their fumbling explanations about the meaning of scriptural words like "adultery" and "circumcision", to the carbuncle on the curate's "B-T-M" and on to the vicar's piles it's all wonderfully observed", and holisticshop applauded "its naive candours, its drolleries, its unconscious humour, its oscillations between the ridiculous and the exalted, and its power to convince, for the very reason that the young diarist never set out with the intention of carrying conviction."
