= Vladimir Sokalsky =

Russian composer

Vladimir Ivanovich Sokalsky (Ukrainian: Сокальський Володимир Іванович; Russian: Владимир Иванович Сокальский, 1863 - 1919) was a composer, musical critic, and lawyer.

== Biography ==
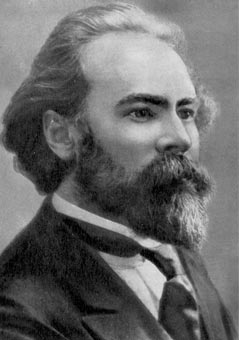
Volodymyr Sokalsky

Vladimir Ivanovich Sokalsky was born in the family of Ivan Petrovich Sokalsky, a Russian writer. He was born on 24 April 1863 at Heidelberg, in the Grand Duchy of Baden.

He graduated from Kharkiv musical school, a branch of the Imperial Russian Musical Community, where studied music from Peter Petrovich Sokalsky, and compositions from Iwan Knorr. He also graduated from Kharkiv University (the faculty of law). He was a conductor of an orchestra in opera-enterprise of Vasily Nikolaevich Andreev-Burlak. Since 1882 contributed as a musical reviewer of the "South country" newspaper, under a pseudonym Don-Diez. At meetings of the Kharkov branch of Russian musical society its products were executed, and the opera "Repka" was performed in Poltave, Smolensk, Tiflis and Kharkov. In 1902 he was a prosecutor at the Ust-Medveditsa district court. In the autumn of 1911, he became the Chairman of the Vologda district Court. In 1918 in Vologda, he performed several lectures and concerts devoted to creativity of Beethoven and Grieg with his daughter Lydia, and son-in-law Ilya Ginetsinsky. In 1919, he went on a holiday to Sevastopol and fell ill with typhus. He died there also still in 1919, and was buried in the town cemetery.

== Memory ==
- The grave in the town cemetery in Sevastopol, was found by the composer M.V. Kovalev, a monument created by architect N.N. Sdobnyakov. On the gray granite lira and the inscription: composer V.I. Sokalsky.
- In Kharkov, a music school named after the composer.

== Creative activity ==
- Symphony in G-moll (Kharkiv), 1894
  - Symphony in G minor / Orchestral ed. Borisova; arranged for f.-p. Yu. Rozhavskoy; foreword. Borisova and A.N. Gordeychuk Kiev: Muzichna Ukraine, 1967
- Cello Andante elegiaco
- Piano Pieces op. 1 (Impressions musicales 6 № №);
- Lukashevich K.V. Among the flowers. Fantastic comedy for children in the 2-forth with dancing and singing. Songs arranged by B. Sokalsky. Claudia Lukaszewicz. Ed. 3rd. M., 1914.
- In meadows = Aux champs: entry: Op. 3 № 1 / V.I. Sokalsky, edited by RF Gill. - V. Bessel and Co.. - 5. - (The repertoire of piano works, of works by Russian composers, distributed by the degree of difficulty and marking the correct fingering, and 2 series. 3-er degree. No.11).
- Canzonetta: Op. 1 № 3 / V. Sokalsky; edited by RF Gill. - St.: V. Bessel and Co.. - 3. - (The repertoire of piano pieces from the works of Russian composers, distributed by degree of difficulty and labeled correctly fingering, 2-series. 3-er degree. №).
- Elegie: por cello et piano: Op. 8 / par Wladimir Sokalsky. - Music Store N. Mareček. - 13 sec.
- Elegie: Pur cello et piano: Op. 8 Kharkov: Mareček, B.G.
- Turnip: opera-Tale in the 1 st step: Op. 10: klaviraustsug for singing and piano / libretto Ek. Guy Sagaidachny (on the theme of folk tales), music V.I. Sokalsky. - P. Jurgenson. - 75 sec.
- Turnip: Opera-tale in a village: Op. 10 / Libretto Ek. Guy Sagaidachny (on bunks. Tales); Moose. V.I. Sokalsky, Leipzig: M.M.Jurgenson, qualification. 1899
- Guy Sagaidachnya Ek. (1856? -1916) Turnip: Picture in a village for children (on the theme of children. Tales): Libretto / [Op.] Ek. Guy Sagaidachnya; Moose. V.I. Sokalsky. Kharkov: Tipo-lit. "Pecs. Case," the book. K.N. Gagarin, 1900
- Turnip: Opera-tale in a 1-m D.: Op. 10 / Libretto Ek. Guy Sagaidachnya (on bunks. Tales); Moose. V.I. Sokalsky M.: Gos. publ. Mus. Sector, 1924
- Minuet: Op. 1 № 4 / V. Sokalsky, published under the editorship of R.F. Gill. - St.: V. Bessel and Co.. - 5. - (The repertoire of piano pieces from the works of Russian composers distributed by degree of difficulty and labeled correctly fingering, Series 2. Degre 4-me № 1).
- The mowers: Op. 3 № 2 / V. Sokalsky, published under the editorship of R.F. Gill. - St. : B. Bessel and Co.. - 5. - (The repertoire of piano pieces from the works of Russian composers distributed by degree of difficulty and labeled correctly fingering, Series 2. Degre 3-me № 12).
- The play / V. Sokalsky; shifted. and ed. Party Viola M. Greenberg Kiev: Moose. Ukraine, 1980
- Au berceau: For f.- p.: Op. 1, № 5 St. Petersburg. : Bessel and K °, B.G.

=== Romances ===
- At bedtime: In one voice with the ACC. PT.: d.1-g.2: Op. 16, № 2 KA. N. Ogarev. Moscow: P. Jurgenson, B.G. - 5
- Wood: for baritone: Op. 6 / words by A. Koltsov, music by V. Sokalsky. - M.; Pg. : P. Jurgenson. - 11 sec. - (Romances for one voice with piano music. Music V. Sokalsky).
- Every time I see thee: ballad / words Y.I. Shpazhinsky; music V.I. Sokalsky. -Music Store I. Mareček. - 7. - (Music Romansy. V. Sokalsky).
- Every time I see you: Romance: To vote with the OP.: C-fis.1 / Sl. Y.I. Shpazhinsky Kharkov: Moose. Mag. N. Mareček, qualification. 1900.
- I come to you with greetings: To vote with the OP.: Dis.1-a.2: Op. 16, № 3 KA. Fet, Moscow: P. Jurgenson, B.G.
- Oh, the honor is a fine fellow: c.1-f.2 / Sl. Tolstoy Kharkov: Moose. Mag. N. Mareček, qualification. 1903 - 5. - (Romances and songs to be sung to the accompaniment of a piano;
- Why? / Music V.I.Sokalsky. - North Lyra: A. Zeyvanga. - 5.
- "Why?" : For voice and f.-p.; c.1-f.2 Kharkov: Mareček, qualification. 1905
- I shook his hand to you ... : Song / words J.N. Shpazhinsky; music V.I. Sokalsky, Italian lang. translated G. Astillero. - Music Store N. Mareček. - 7. - (Romansy. Music V. Sokalsky).
- I shook his hand to you: Romance: To vote with the OP.: Cf.1 / Sl. Y.I. Shpazhinsky; to Italy. lang. per. Astillero Kharkov: Moose. Mag. N. Mareček, qualification. 1900
- Elegy: Op. 2 № 3 / words by A. Pushkin; music V.I. Sokalsky. - Vasily Bessel and Co.. - 5. - (Six songs. Music V. Sokalsky; 3).
- Dvi p'esi: Transkr. for violoncheli i f.-p. Mr. Pecker Kiev: Mistetstvo, 1952
- Oh May, May: dis.1-g.2 / Song of the Taras Shevchenko Kiev: Moose. Mag. N. Mareček, qualification. 1903
- Song.- Moscow: Muzgiz, 1954
- Romances: To vote with the accompanying. PT. / Comp. and author. foreword. Z.B. Yuferova Kiev: Moose. Ukraine, 1991

== Literature ==
- Yuferova Z. B. Outstanding figure of Ukrainian musical culture composer and critic V. Sokalsky (1863–1919). Cand. Dis. for obtaining scientific. degree candidate. Art. (821) Kiev, 1971.(in Russian)
- Кириллова Э. А. Вологда музыкальная: век ХХ. — Вологда, 2001. — с.3, 13, 14, 29.(in Russian)
