= William Beatton Moonie =

British composer

William Beatton Moonie (1883–1961) was a Scottish composer. He gives his name to the Moonie Collection, a collection of music held by Glasgow University.

== Life ==
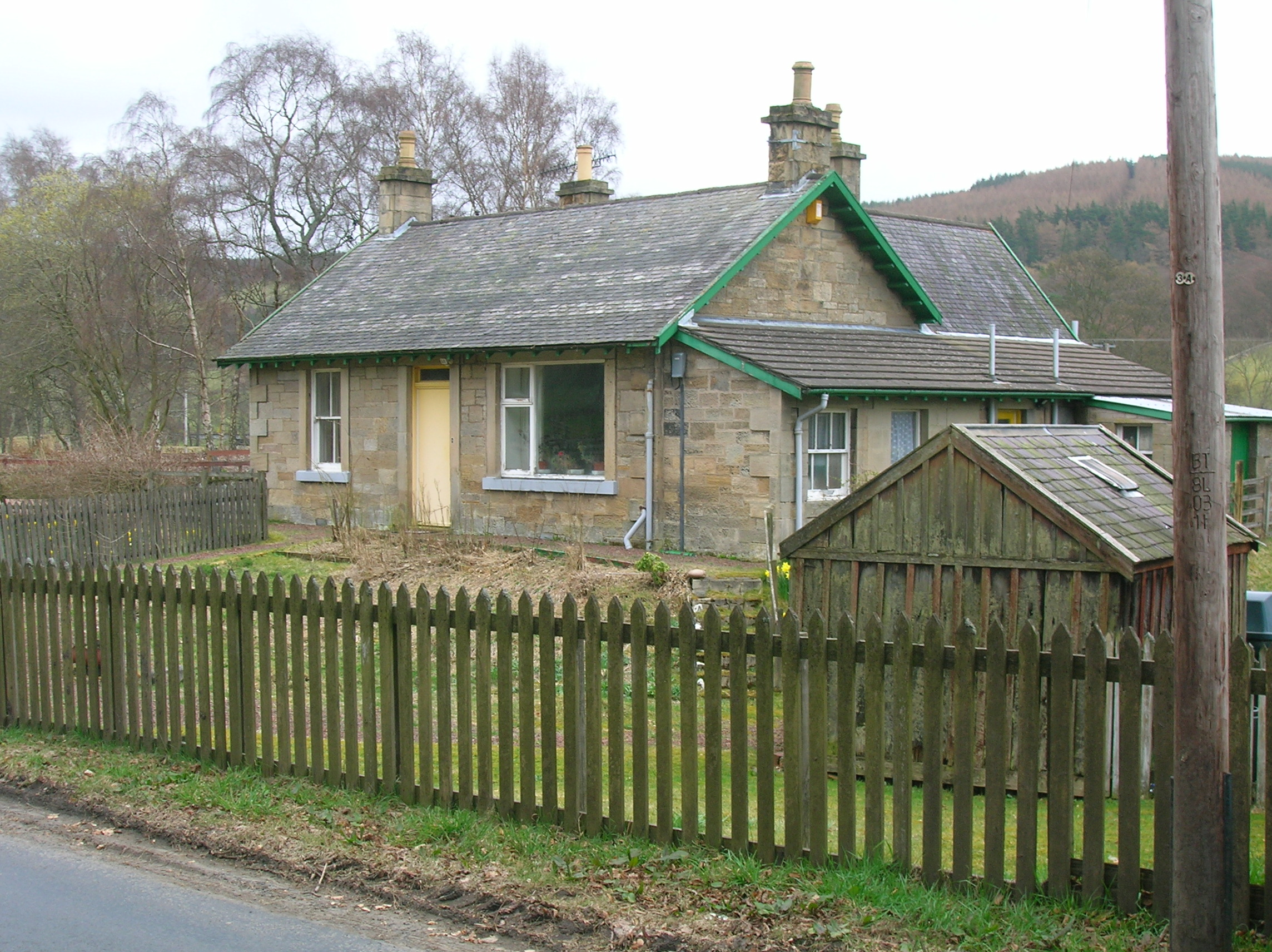
Stobo station master's house

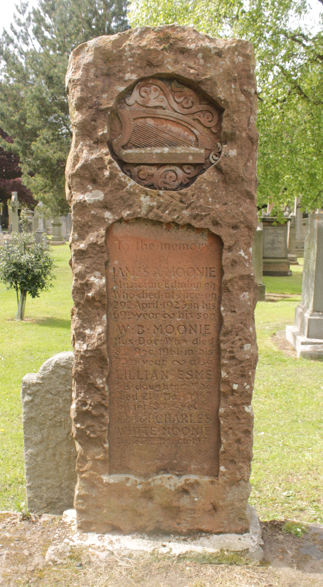
The Moonie grave in Grange Cemetery, Edinburgh

He was born somewhat prematurely at the station master's house at Stobo railway station on 29 May 1883 while his parents were taking a brief holiday from their usual home in Edinburgh. His father James Anderson Moonie (d.1923) was a music teacher living at 33 Oxford Street, a flat in the Newington district of Edinburgh. His mother, Clementina Greenaway, had been a secretary. James was a member of the Hope Park United Presbyterian Church and founded the Hope Park Musical Association in 1886. He also ran several choirs, most famously "Mr Moonie's Choir" founded in 1896.

William was educated at Daniel Stewart's College (where his father became Music Master in 1887) then studied History of Music at Edinburgh University. There he studied under Frederick Niecks and graduated BMus in 1902 also winning the Bucher Scholarship, which enabled him to do postgraduate studies at the University of Frankfurt under Iwan Knorr, Lazzaro Uzielli and Willi Rehberg (father of Walter Rehberg).

On his return to Britain in 1908 he had further tuition from Donald Tovey and through him befriended Erik Chisholm. He went back to living with his family in Edinburgh, who at this point had moved to a much larger property at 44 Morningside Park.

In 1910 he took a post teaching at Moray House in Edinburgh and in 1915 became music teacher at Daniel Stewart's College, moving to George Heriot's School in 1919. He then moved to Watson's Ladies College on Queen Street, Edinburgh.

In 1912 he is noted in arranging an evening of traditional music, aided by John Bartholomew, advocate, of the "Misses Tolmie" including "Miss Tolmie's Waulking Song".

His most famous work, the opera "The Weird of Colbar", premiered at the Theatre Royal in Glasgow in March 1937, a romantic story concerning the Jacobite Alan Colbar. The title appears an allusion to Scott's "Weir of Hermiston" and the lyrics are in large part derived from Scott.

In 1945 he was awarded an honorary doctorate by Edinburgh University.

He died in Edinburgh on 8 December 1961 and is buried with his father in the Grange Cemetery. The grave lies not far from the main entrance on the right hand side of the first north-south path.

== Known compositions ==
- Springtime on Tweed
- The Weird of Colbar (opera)
- First Piano Quintet (1919)
- Symphony in A major
- Reverie (1922)
- Perthshire Echoes (1924), anthology
- A Scottish Chapbook, anthology
- Five Pieces for Piano
- Arabesque (1923)
- Five Romantic Pieces (1955)
- Lord of the Isles
- Campbell of Kilmohr
- Proud Maisie
- Jock O'Hazeldean

== Family ==
In 1924 he married Janet Glegg (b.1896). They had two children: Alan Graham Moonie (1925-2008) and Annot Lyle Moonie, who married William Lightheart, also a music teacher.
