= Pier Arts Centre =

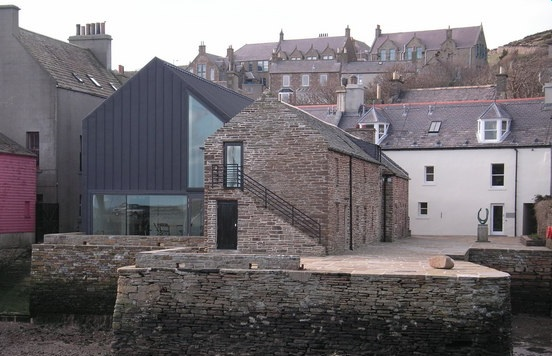
- The Pier Arts Centre from opposite pier
- Established: 1979
- Location: Stromness, Orkney, Scotland
- Coordinates: 58.96297°N 3.29834°W
- Type: Art Gallery & Museum
- Website: www.pierartscentre.com

The Pier Arts Centre is an art gallery and museum in Stromness, Orkney, Scotland. It was established in 1979 to provide a home for an important collection of fine art donated to "be held in trust for Orkney" by the author, peace activist and philanthropist Margaret Gardiner (1904–2005). Alongside the permanent collection the Centre curates a year-round programme of changing exhibitions and events.

== History ==
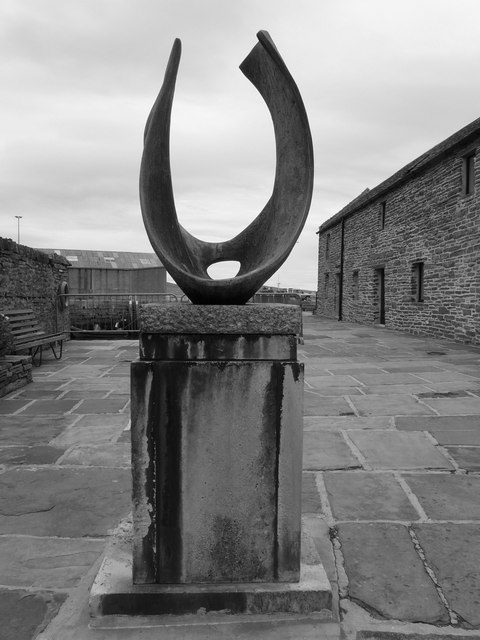
Curved Form (Trevalgan) by Hepworth

=== 18th and 19th centuries ===
The buildings occupied by The Pier Arts Centre are firmly rooted in the history of Orkney. The house fronting the street was built in the 18th century, and during much of the 19th century was occupied by Edward Clouston, a prosperous merchant and Agent of the Hudson's Bay Company. On the pier behind the house, Clouston erected stores and offices. On the first floor of his house, he had a finely panelled drawing room, furnished with books, family portraits, and a pianoforte.

The arrival early each summer of the Hudson's Bay Company ships en route for Canada was a social highlight in Stromness. In June 1840, Mr and Mrs Clouston entertained for a week a party of ladies travelling to join their husbands in the Hudson's Bay Company. Their daughter, Anne Rose, married Augustus Edward Pelly of Montreal, a relative of John Henry Pelly, governor of the Hudson's Bay Company from 1822 to 1852 and of the Bank of England in 1841–42.

In 1872 the premises came into the possession of John Aim Shearer, whose general merchant's business was to last nearly 100 years. In the late 19th century, Stromness was a flourishing centre of the herring fishing. J. A. Shearer erected a shop across the street from his house and established a cooperage on the pier. At this time, most trade with the east coast of Scotland was carried on by local trading vessels and Shearer's schooners, Maggie, Janet, Mary Ann and Minnie, three of them named after his daughters, were a familiar sight discharging their cargoes at the end of the pier.

=== 20th century to the present ===
The herring boom passed and by 1918 all Shearer's schooners were gone – three of them lost at sea; the pier became a quiet backwater. It remained thus until the Second World War, when the upper part of the pier store was requisitioned by the Royal Engineers as a base for planning the many army camps and installations required in the area. Later the upper floor was used as a dwelling. Between 1965 and 1971 the property was split between three owners. The main dwelling and part of the pier building became a private lodging house and hostel. In 1977 The Pier Arts Centre Trust purchased the original dwelling and the pier store.

Margaret Gardiner had first visited Orkney in the 1950s and converted the old quayside building to house her collection of modern paintings and sculpture. Born into a well-to-do family Gardiner studied at Cambridge University before a brief spell as a teacher. She was an early activist against the fascist movement in the 1930s and in the 1960s organised an international press campaign of public figures against the Vietnam War. The author of several books including a biography of Barbara Hepworth she was also associated with some of the major figures in 20th century literature including Louis MacNeice and W. H. Auden.

Although never happy to be called a collector – "I hate being called a collector, for I never set out to collect" – Gardiner gathered together, through friendship and astute patronage, a very personal and important collection of art that closely charts the development of British Modernism. Gardiner's interest in art was deeply influenced by her long friendship with the Hepworth and through this friendship she came into contact with many of the principal figures in 20th century British art, including Hepworth's second husband, Ben Nicholson.

Throughout the 1930s and 40s Gardiner was a key supporter of the small group of artists who sought sanctuary in St Ives and she was also an early champion of the Cornish painter and seaman Alfred Wallis. Following the Second World War she encountered and encouraged a new generation of artists, including Peter Lanyon, Patrick Heron, Terry Frost, Margaret Mellis, John Wells and Roger Hilton, that had been drawn to St Ives by its growing reputation as a centre of innovation.

The Collection has grown steadily since 1979 and now contains over 180 works, grouped around the central genre of Modernism, spanning the period from 1929 to the present day. Most recently work by international contemporary artists, including Sean Scully, Eva Rothschild, Martin Boyce, Camilla Løw and Olafur Eliasson, has been acquired.

In 2025, students from primary schools all around Orkney including Stromness Primary School, gave their school artwork to the Pier Arts Centre for an art exhibition.

== Architecture ==
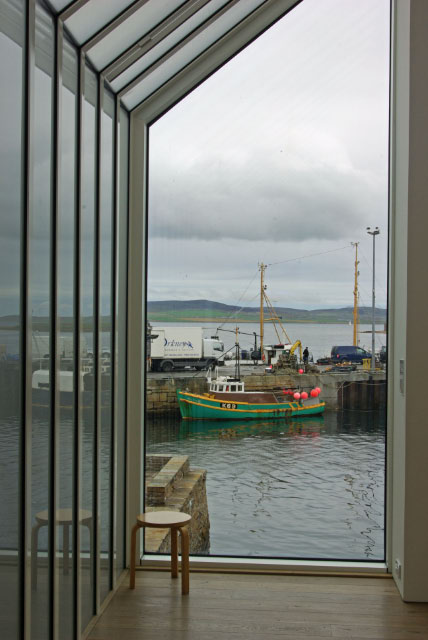
Looking out from the Arts Centre to the traditional fishing activities on the pier

The Pier Arts Centre re-emerged in July 2007 following a two-year period of construction. The original listed buildings and pier, that had housed the office and stores of the Hudson's Bay Company, have been extended by Reiach & Hall Architects who have created a new building at the harbour's edge.

== Artists in the collection ==
- Roger Ackling
- Robert Adams
- Kenneth Armitage
- Adam Barker-Mill
- Wilhelmina Barns-Graham
- Julius Bissier
- Sandra Blow
- Martin Boyce
- Michael Broido
- Stanley Cursiter
- Alan Davie
- Robyn Denny
- Katy Dove
- Olafur Eliasson
- Ian Hamilton Finlay
- Lesley Foxcroft
- Mark Francis
- Terry Frost
- Naum Gabo
- William Gear
- Robin Gillanders
- Douglas Gordon
- Barbara Hepworth
- Patrick Heron
- Roger Hilton
- Callum Innes
- Alan Johnston
- Anish Kapoor
- Peter Lanyon
- Bet Low
- Camilla Low
- Steven MacIver
- F E McWilliam
- Margaret Mellis
- Garry Fabian Miller
- Mary Newcomb
- Ben Nicholson
- Simon Nicholson
- Eduardo Paolozzi
- Serge Poliakoff
- Alan Reynolds
- Ragna Robertsdottir
- Eva Rothschild
- Ian Scott
- William Scott
- Sean Scully
- Ross Sinclair
- Margaret Tait
- Italo Valenti
- Keith Vaughan
- Alfred Wallis
- John Wells
- Sylvia Wishart
