= Bernard Deacon (anthropologist) =

English social anthropologist (1903–1927)

Arthur Bernard Deacon (1903–1927) was a social anthropologist who carried out fieldwork on the islands of Malakula and Ambrym in what is now Vanuatu.

Deacon was born in Nikolayev, then in south Russia, where his English father worked for a shipping firm, and at the age of thirteen was sent back to finish his education in England. Deacon graduated from Trinity College, Cambridge, and was awarded a grant for anthropological fieldwork in Malakula. He arrived there in January 1926 and died there on 12 March 1927 of blackwater fever.

Deacon's fieldwork was edited by Camilla Wedgwood into an ethnography in 1934. Wedgwood incorporated the notes of the earlier field-worker John Layard into the book without Layard's knowledge and following threats of legal action the first edition only appeared with Layard's comments. The book was drawn on by both later ethnographers and present-day inhabitants of the islands, although later fieldwork by Margaret Patterson radically reinterpreted his evidence on the Ambrym marriage system.

Deacon had known Margaret Gardiner, a fellow student, for more than a year before leaving Cambridge, but they only started a relationship on the evening before his departure from Cambridge. Although they exchanged many letters, and arranged to meet in Australia to live as a couple, they never met again. Gardiner's memoir of Deacon was published in 1984.

In 2011, a collection of 16 volumes of notebooks, and additional drawings, correspondence and genealogies relating to Deacon's work in Vanuatu, covering the period from 1926 to 1927, was placed in the UNESCO's Memory of the World International Register.

== Works ==
- A. B. Deacon, Notes on Some Islands of the New Hebrides. Journal of the Royal Anthropological Institute of Great Britain and Ireland 59:461–515 (1929), ed. C. Wedgwood.
- A. B. Deacon, Malekula: a vanishing people in the New Hebrides, ed. C. Wedgwood (1934)
- A. B. Deacon, ‘The regulation of marriage in Ambrym’, Journal of the Royal Anthropological Institute, 57 (1927)
- A. B. Deacon, '4 Geometrical Drawings from Malekula and Other Islands of the New Hebrides.' Journal of the Royal Anthropological Institute of Great Britain and Ireland 64:129–175. (1934)
