= George Gardiner (folk-song collector) =

George Barnet Gardiner (1852 – 1910) was a Scottish-born folk-song collector who collected songs from traditional singers in Southern England, chiefly in Hampshire, but also in Surrey, Sussex, Somerset and other counties. He collected over 1,400 songs in a six-year period between 1904 and his death in 1910.

== Biography ==
=== Early life, education and career ===
Gardiner was born in Kincardine-on-Forth, Fife, Scotland. He studied classical subjects at the University of Edinburgh and after graduating became an assistant there. From 1883 he taught at Edinburgh Academy, where he met and formed a friendship with fellow teacher Henry Edward Denison Hammond, with whom he shared an interest in folk song. He retired in 1896 to translate and write textbooks.

=== Folk song collecting ===
In 1903, he began a "systematic study" of European folk song, building up a large collection of songs and learning songs in many different languages. He learned of and joined the Folk Song Society, and read the six issues of their Journal published up to that time, writing later "In these volumes I at last found what I wanted - a body of nameless, hereditary songs of the people...."

Gardiner began collecting in 1904, probably with H. E. D. Hammond, in the Bath area of Somerset near the Hammond family home, collecting 20 songs. He wasn't confident of his ability to record tunes accurately, so his practice was to collect the text himself and to get a colleague to note down the tune, often some time later. In 1905, he collected some songs from the area around Launceston in North Cornwall, and in Somerset, but then on the suggestion of Lucy Broadwood. Secretary of the English Folk Song Society, switched his attention to Hampshire. With the help of the composer Balfour Gardiner (not a relation) to note the tunes, he collected 60 songs in the area to the east and south of Winchester in June 1905, but soon found that the intensely busy times of hay making and harvesting made collecting from country singers difficult.

In early 1906 Gardiner and H. E. D. Hammond collected around 100 songs from the Bath area of Somerset, and Gardiner then returned to Hampshire. This time he was assisted by Charles Gamblin and John Fisher Guyer, and, when hay-making commenced, collected from the workhouses, whose elderly occupants were always on tap. By November 1907 he and his colleagues had collected another 890 songs. He was in the habit of finding and collecting texts from his singers and then arranging for his colleagues to visit to note down the tunes, and gradually he got further and further ahead of them, so that on some occasions his often elderly informants had died or moved before the tune-takers visited them. He also got behind in writing up his notes, so that by the time he died he had collected around 1400 songs but had written up only 800. He continued collecting in 1908, and possibly 1909, mainly in Hampshire but with forays into the neighbouring counties of Surrey, Sussex, and Wiltshire.

=== Death ===
In 1910, Gardiner died of kidney failure and was buried in Edinburgh.

== Legacy ==
In June 1909, an issue of the Journal of the Folk Song Society (Vol. 3, No. 13) included 45 songs collected by Gardiner, with a brief introduction by him. In the same year 16 songs were published as Book III of the series "Folk Songs of England" edited by Cecil Sharp. After Gardiner's death his notebooks and the music manuscripts of his collaborators came into the possession of the Folk Song Society.

Due to misunderstandings arising from the way Gardiner's songs were presented in the Journal, several of the songs he collected have been mistakenly attributed to Ralph Vaughan Williams in, for example, The Penguin Book of English Folk Songs, Folk Songs collected by Ralph Vaughan Williams and The Traditional Tunes of the Child Ballads.

In 1965 the EFDSS published "Marrow Bones", a compilation of songs from the Gardiner and Hammond collections edited by Frank Parslow. Three more books followed - "The Wanton Seed" (1968), "The Constant Lovers (1972) and "The Foggy Dew" (1974). In total these books contained 202 songs collected by Gardiner. The Marrow Bone series was an important source of material for English folk musicians, and has recently been revised and reprinted in three books.
