= Henry John Gardiner (businessman) =

English businessman (1843–1940)

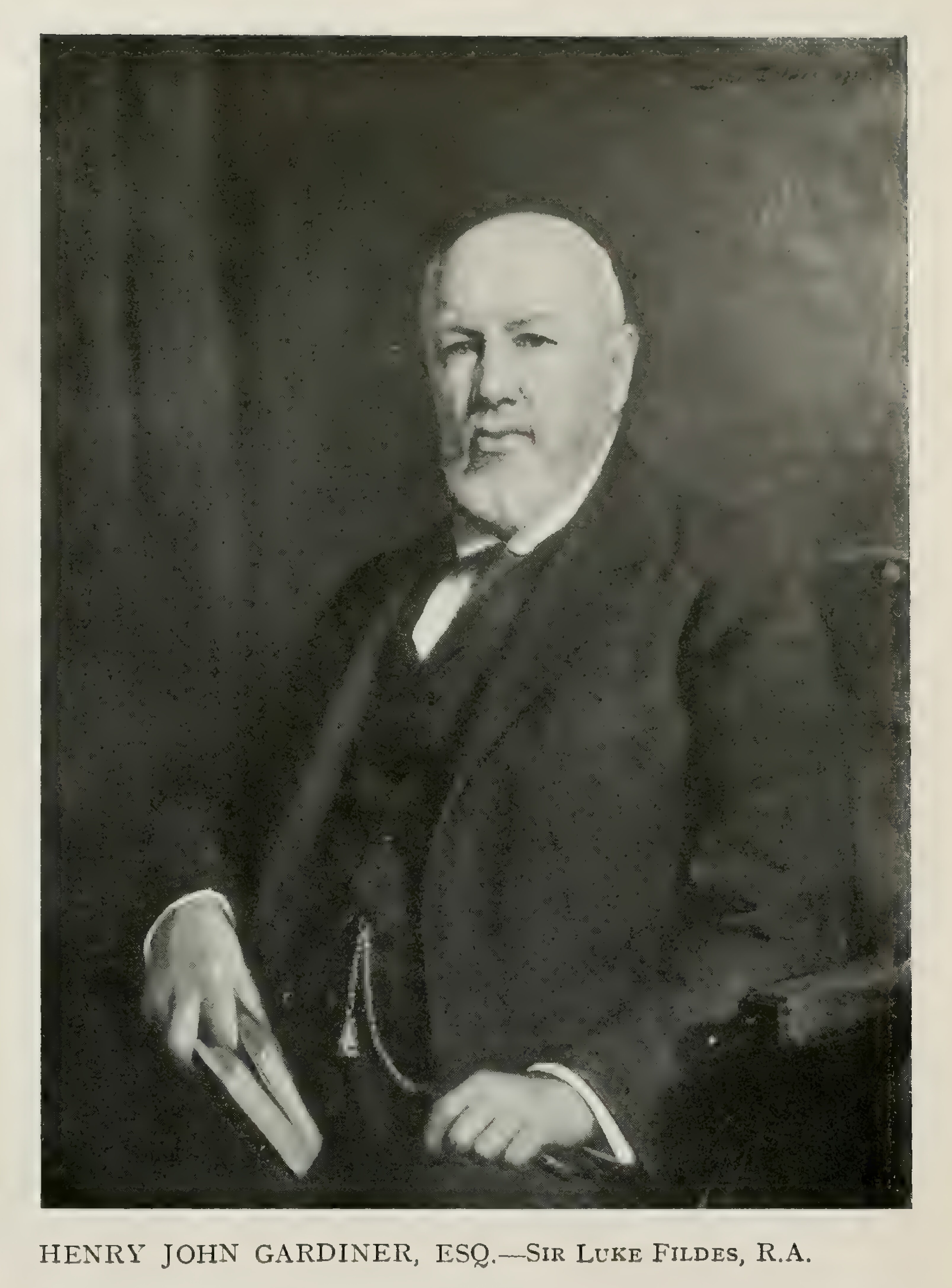
H. J. Gardiner in 1920, painted by Sir Luke Fildes

Henry John Gardiner (born 1843, died 2 February 1940) was an English businessman who made an immense fortune in the clothing industry (colloquially known as the 'rag trade'), as chairman of various drapery warehousing and wholesale firms, and other business investments. His life was relatively uneventful, and he divided his time between his business affairs in London and shooting in the Hampshire countryside. He had two sons who profited from his enormous wealth, H. Balfour Gardiner, composer and patron of British classical music, and Sir Alan H. Gardiner, a renowned Egyptologist who was present at the discovery of Tutankhamen's tomb in 1922.

== Early life ==
He was born in Bristol in 1843, baptised on 11 December 1843 at the church of St Michael on the Mount Without.

His father, also named Henry Gardiner, was born in Bristol in 1809. He worked in the woollen drapery business carrying on his own father's retail trade, and started a modest wholesale clothing firm with connections in the West of England and South Wales. He developed a lucrative export trade in ready-made clothing to the West Indies, followed by a series of Australian gold rushes from 1854 which increased profits considerably: supported by his two brothers, the firm began exporting to Australasia in 1854. He partnered with Charles Wathen in 1862 to form Wathen Gardiner & Co., now Bristol Uniforms. Henry Gardiner soon retired to Caterham on the Hill, Surrey, where he bought an estate called Essendene (now demolished) and died in Caterham in 1884, leaving an estate worth around £70,000 (at least £9,000,000 in 2024.)

His mother was Margaret née Henderson; Henry John Gardiner was the only son out of six children.

Gardiner received a "somewhat limited education" leaving school before the age of 16, and worked in a woollen warehouse in Liverpool for two years, 'learning the trade'.

== Career ==
=== H. J. Gardiner & Co. ===
He joined his father's business aged about 19 in Bristol shortly before the latter's retirement in 1862, and then travelled to British Columbia where he worked in a merchanting house for several years. Returning to Britain, he formed his own firm, H. J. Gardiner & Co, an import-export merchant shipping company with offices at 1 Gresham Buildings, 70 Basinghall Street, E.C.

The firm had agents in Boston in 1868 and Vancouver in 1918 H. J. Gardiner & Co. acted as agents for a number of other companies, including Robert Ward & Co., Merchants and Importers, and Shipping Insurance Agents of Victoria, BC, in 1887; and also the registered office of the London and Blantyre Supply Company, Importers, Exporters and General Merchants in 1922. H. J. Gardiner & Co. suffered a shipping loss in 1917 during World War I. (Note: The German U-boat SM U-81 sank the steamer Port Adelaide on 3 February 1917 in the Atlantic Ocean, 180 nautical miles (330 km) south west of the Fastnet Rock. See also List of shipwrecks in February 1917#3 February. Part of the vessel's cargo was cotton and woolen goods for H J Gardiner and Co. The insurance claim was settled by the government.)

Gardiner liquidated the business in around 1922 on the death of his business partner.

=== Bradbury, Greatorex & Co ===
In 1869 aged about 26 he invested in the firm of Bradbury, Greatorex & Co., wholesalers of cloth, muslin, linen and imported silks, with warehouses in Aldermanbury, Cripplegate ward, London EC2, eventually becoming chairman in around 1895, a position he held until 1939; on retiring he became an honorary director.

Bradbury, Greatorex & Co. was established in 1815 by John Bradbury and Jeremiah Greatorex, with a warehouse in Aldermanbury, in the area which became the centre of the 'rag trade' (the clothing industry) in the City of London. It continued as a privately owned company for over half a century. The firm was instrumental in supporting a new building for the Boys' and Girls' School of Cripplegate Inner Ward which opened in 1838. The warehouse burned down in a disastrous fire in 1845, with a total loss of £250,000. The City of London Guildhall narrowly escaped extensive damage. The warehouse was rebuilt and enlarged as Nos. 2 - 11 Aldermanbury, with further buildings in Fountain and Dyer's Courts, (Note: Not to be confused with Fountain Court, Temple, London.) built in the same street after the fire.

The company was incorporated in 1869, the same year as Gardiner joined the board, and was later converted into a public limited company in 1898 with a capital value of £400,000, and was the seventh largest textile merchant in London. In 1914 there were around about 500 or 600 employees. The firm had representatives in New Zealand, New South Wales, Victoria and Western Australia; also in Canada, Nova Scotia, Cape Colony, Natal, the Transvaal, and West Indies.

The firm issued commercial overprint postage stamps as receipts for tax payments.

The warehouses, still on the same site, escaped another fire during the night of 29 December 1940 during the London Blitz through the prompt efforts of the staff who were on fire-watch duty. After the war the firm removed to newly built premises, Ivanhoe House on Aldersgate Street. The Corporation of London approved a change of use from warehouse to offices, and the building was finally demolished in around 1987. The firm became part of Courtaulds plc in 1984.

After his marriage in 1870 (see § Family life) he lived at 6, Orsett Terrace, Westbourne Terrace, London W2, where his first son, H. Balfour Gardiner was born. By 1879 he had moved to Eltham, at the time in Kent, where his second son Alan was born. He was connected with the founding of a Mission Hall in 1884 in Pope Street, Eltham (now Avery Hill Road and Southwood Road, joining Foots Cray Road.) It closed in 1898.

He moved to 25 Tavistock Square, London in around 1890, and also had the use of a house known as "Moody's Down" in Sutton Scotney, Hampshire, where he enjoyed shooting as a recreation.

=== Other investments ===
He owned a tea plantation estate in the Cholo district, Nyasaland, now in Malawi. Connections with a tea plantation in Nyasaland continued with the Cholo Land and Rubber Estate Company. This seems to be connected with the Nchima Tea and Tung Estate, of which his grandson Rolf Gardiner became chairman.

He became a director or chairman of several other companies. He was chairman of the Holborn Viaduct Land Company Crown (Note: A Crown corporation is a firm established by a state or government, partially run by civil servants. The term "crown corporation" is most common in Commonwealth countries such as Canada, New Zealand, and Australia.) which bought up open land (described as a "howling wilderness") around the Holborn Viaduct, completed in 1869, where new buildings were put up from around 1875. (Note: Other directors of the Holborn Land Company in 1904 included Charles Morley (MP for Breconshire and Honorary Secretary of the Royal College of Music). See also John Haigh, the "Acid Bath Murderer", who sold fraudulent shares of the company in c.1934.)

He was chairman of the Blackwell Colliery Company in Newton, Derbyshire, a director of the Bolsover Colliery Company, Derbyshire, and a director of Kingsbury Collieries Ltd., Tamworth, Staffordshire from 1903, along with Sir George A. Touche in 1923 becoming chairman in 1934.

He was deputy chairman of the Atlas Assurance Company and a director of the Canadian Bank of Commerce (probably the London branch at 2 Lombard Street).

He was a member of Lloyd's of London from 1904.

Although he took no part in the public life of the City of London, Gardiner was elected Sheriff of the County of London for 1919–1920. Sir Luke Fildes painted a portrait of him, entitled 'Henry John Gardiner, Esq.' (see top of article).

In 1940 his London address was 8, St. Agnes Court, Porchester Terrace, London W.2.

== Other activities ==
Gardiner was a Freemason. In 1886 he belonged to the Royal Somerset House and Inverness Chapter, No. 4, one of the original four masonic lodges which constituted the Premier Grand Lodge of England, now the United Grand Lodge of England. In 1899 he was the third Principal Officer (J).

He seems to have had a keen interest in the natural world, including plants, geology and geography.

- Letter from Henry J. Gardiner dated 2 September 1876 to Sir Joseph Dalton Hooker, from 60 Queen Victoria Street, London: "Gardiner writes to inform Hooker that he will forward a grass specimen to him on behalf of some Central American clients, an explanation of which is provided in a memorandum [not included]. Gardiner would be grateful to receive any information on the plant. 'Lucopodium[?] furiforme, 'Borg' is added in another hand."
- Letter dated 6 August 1889 from H. J. Gardiner & Co at 1 Gresham Buildings to George Nicholson at the Royal Botanic Gardens, Kew. "Gardiner & Co write in conjunction with Mr Gov. Wilczynski 'late of San Lorenzo, Ecuador', regarding seeds and fruits from the Cauca Valley which they had forwarded to RBG Kew. Gardiner & Co request that once Nicholson has received them, he confirm their safe arrival. Annotations indicate that 13 packets of seeds were received unnamed; they are described as a 'rubbishy' collection."

He became a member of the Royal Geographical Society in 1873.

He was a Member of the Geological Society. A scrapbook contains an example of his signature. In 1936 the Natural History Museum acquired a collection of rocks described by him: "A general collection of about three hundred specimens, including some from the Exhibition of 1851, and various rocks originally described by Prof. H. L. Reynolds and Mr. H. J. Gardiner have been bought."

He also made two donations to the British Museum: in 1871 a 'medicine mask' from the Tlingit people in Sitka, Alaska: "When living in Vancouver Island, a Hudson's Bay Company Captain obtained for me at my request from the Indians who inhabit the mainland of the neighbourhood of Sitka, a wooden painted medicine Mask, used at the Indian feasts; and I believe they are very scarce now ..." and in 1910, a small three-spouted vase or vessel from Nicaragua.

== Death ==
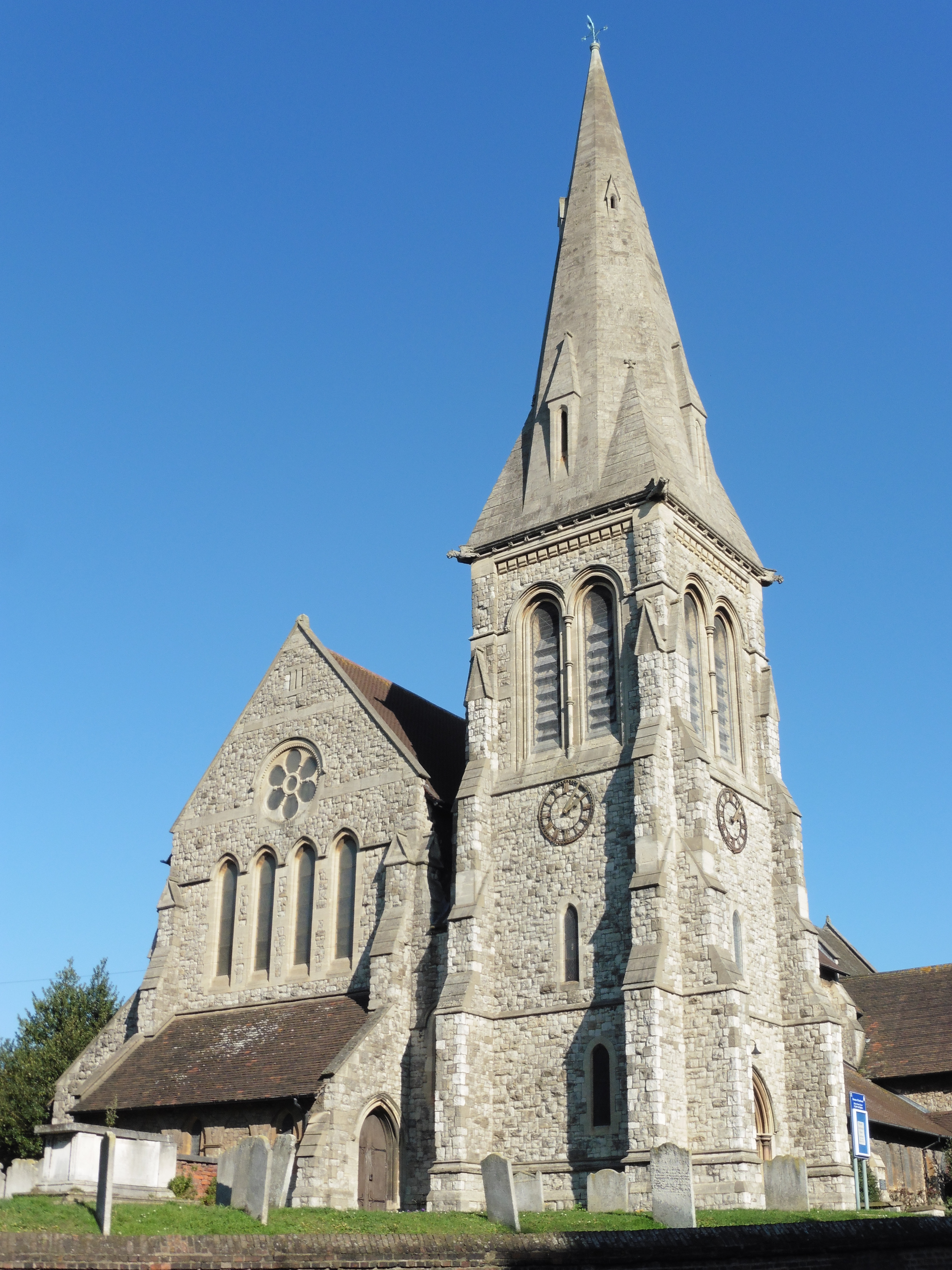
St John the Baptist, Eltham where he was buried

Gardiner died on 2 February 1940 aged 96, at his country home of Wonston, Sutton Scotney, Hampshire. He was buried on 13 February 1940 at St John the Baptist church, Eltham.

Probate: 20 May 1940 - £372, 210 approx £17 million in 2024. Executors: Balfour and Alan Gardiner; a solicitor; and Frank Gardiner Fedden, a retired chartered accountant and perhaps a relative. (Note: F. G. Fedden joined the Institute of Chartered Accountants in 1892. A later business address was 108a Cannon Street, London EC4. He lived at "Four Winds", Cleeve, Goring-on-Thames, Oxfordshire. He was the son of S. Fedden, Ealing. He was an ice skater with Wimbledon Skating Team, won medals etc.)

== Family life ==
He married Clara Elizabeth née Honey, on 31 May 1870 at Holy Trinity church, Westbourne Terrace, Paddington, with whom he had two sons, the composer Henry Balfour Gardiner (who always signed himself "H. Balfour Gardiner") and Alan Henderson Gardiner, a renowned Egyptologist, apparently named after his grandmother, Margaret née Henderson. His wife Clara died not long after giving birth to their second son, and Gardiner seems not to have remarried.
