= The Initiate =

The Initiate: Some Impressions of A Great Soul is a combined anthology and parable dealing with the occult, written by the British composer Cyril Scott in the early 1900s. It was first published (anonymously) in 1920.

== Description ==
The book is divided into two parts: an anthology entitled “Justin Moreward Haig” and describing a mysterious person identified only by that pseudonym through a series of anecdotal stories, and a parable illustrating certain principles of occult philosophy entitled “The Circuitous Journey.”

Virtually all the attention drawn by the book has centered on the person and identity of Haig, who is asserted to be a real person (a “very well known Englishman”) who was living in London at the time the book was written. The author of the book claims to have become friends with Haig and to have found him to be a most remarkable individual—an initiate or adept, in occult terms. The anecdotes illustrate the somewhat unconventional philosophy held by Haig through the retelling of various meetings and encounters with him and with others, whom Haig usually tries to advise in spiritual or philosophical terms, with varying results.

The second part of the book is a highly symbolic and traditional parable in which an assortment of occult principles and virtues are illustrated. This fictional portion of the book tells the story of Antonius, a wealthy and jaded individual who decides to set aside his life of materialistic pleasures and seek greater occult truths on a journey into the mountains to meet the members of a spiritual Brotherhood, accompanied by a female companion named Cynara.

== Controversy ==
For many years, there was speculation on the identity of the book's author as well as the identity of Justin Moreward Haig. Today, it is known that Cyril Scott wrote the book, but the true identity of Haig, and indeed the question of his actual existence, remain controversial.

== Sequels ==
The Initiate was followed by two sequels, The Initiate in the New World and The Initiate in the Dark Cycle. The first sequel discusses the adventures of the author and Justin Haig in the United States, and the second discusses the experiences of the pair upon their return to England; both retain the format of an anthology of short anecdotes, although they more closely approach the form of instructive lectures than do those of the first book. The sequels also reference and sometimes critique occult organizations and persons, such as the Theosophical Society, Jiddu Krishnamurti, and Helena Blavatsky.
