= Alan Gardiner =

English Egyptologist and philologist (1879–1963)

Sir Alan Henderson Gardiner
- Gardiner in 1938
- Born: 29 March 1879; Eltham, England
- Died: 19 December 1963 (aged 84); Iffley, near Oxford, England
- Resting place: Iffley churchyard
- Education: Charterhouse School; Queen's College, Oxford
- Occupations: Egyptologist and philologist
- Known for: Advancing knowledge of ancient languages, aided Tutankhamun's tomb excavation
- Children: 3, including Rolf Gardiner and Margaret Gardiner
- Relatives: H. Balfour Gardiner (brother); Martin Bernal (grandson); John Eliot Gardiner (grandson)

Sir Alan Henderson Gardiner, FBA (29 March 1879 – 19 December 1963) was an English Egyptologist, linguist, philologist, and independent scholar. He is regarded as one of the premier Egyptologists of the early and mid-20th century.

== Personal life ==
Gardiner was born on 29 March 1879 in Eltham, which was then in the English county of Kent. His father was Henry John Gardiner, a highly successful entrepreneur and businessman who made a considerable fortune in the drapery and wholesale linen trade in Bristol and London. His mother, Clara Elizabeth née Honey, died in his infancy and he and his elder brother, the composer H. Balfour Gardiner, were brought up by their father's housekeeper. Gardiner was educated at Temple Grove School and Charterhouse.

At school he developed an interest in ancient Egypt, and in 1895–96 he studied under the French archaeologist Gaston Maspero in Paris. He then went to Queen's College, Oxford, with a scholarship to study Literae humaniores (classics). Having achieved a second in Mods, he changed to Hebrew and Arabic, graduating BA with a first class degree in 1901. He was later a student of the prominent Egyptologist Kurt Heinrich Sethe in Berlin.

In 1901, after graduating, he married Hedwig von Rosen in Vienna. They had two sons and a daughter, including the rural revivalist campaigner Rolf Gardiner, and Margaret Gardiner, a patron of the arts.

Gardiner moved to Iffley, near Oxford in 1947. He died there on 19 December 1963 and, after cremation, his ashes were interred in Iffley churchyard.

== Career ==
In 1902, Gardiner moved to Berlin, to help gather material for Adolf Erman's projected Egyptian dictionary, serving as a sub-editor from 1906 to 1908. From 1906 to 1912, he was the Laycock Fellow of Egyptology at Worcester College, Oxford. From 1909 he spent two seasons assisting Arthur Weigall in surveying private tombs in the Thebes area. From 1912 to 1914, he was Reader in Egyptology at the University of Manchester. He otherwise avoided formal academic posts and followed his own academic interests, family wealth enabling him to be financially independent. He was an honorary fellow of The Queen's College, Oxford, his alma mater from 1935 until his death.

Returning to Egypt in 1915, while working on inscriptions at Serabit el-Khadim in the Sinai Peninsula, he identified an unknown hieroglyphic script as the earliest known Semitic alphabet, probably the ancestor of all later Semitic and European ones.

After Howard Carter discovered the near–intact tomb of Tutankhamun in November 1922, Gardiner provided advice and support. This included helping to decipher inscriptions and seal impressions found in the tomb, and advising on Lord Carnarvon's exclusive contract with The Times, and during the 1924–25 legal dispute with the Egyptian Department of Antiquities on access to the partly-excavated tomb.

Gardiner continued to research and publish books and articles until the early 1960s. He however exercised an influence on Egyptology far beyond his publications. Although he held no important academic post, he was universally respected as a senior member of the academic community, and was often consulted on academic appointments. He was a prominent figure in the Egypt Exploration Fund and served as honorary secretary for 1917 to 1920, and later served as its president.

During his career, Gardiner obtained a number of academic honours, including DLitt from Oxford (1910), Fellow of the British Academy (1929), election to the American Philosophical Society (1943), an honorary DLitt from both Durham (1952) and Cambridge (1956), and election to the American Academy of Arts and Sciences (1957). He was knighted in the 1948 Birthday Honours list.

== Works ==
Gardiner's publications include a 1959 book on his study of the Turin King List, and his 1961 work Egypt of the Pharaohs, which covered all aspects of Egyptian chronology and history at the time of publication.

His works related mainly to ancient languages, with his major contributions to ancient Egyptian philology including three editions of Egyptian Grammar and its correlated list of all the Middle Egyptian hieroglyphs in Gardiner's Sign List. Publishing Egyptian Grammar produced one of the few available hieroglyphic printing fonts.

In 1914, he helped establish the Egypt Exploration Fund's Journal of Egyptian Archaeology which he edited intermittently between 1916 and 1946.

== Selected bibliography ==
- The Egyptian Origins of the Semitic Alphabet, Journal of Egyptian Archaeology 3 (1916), pp. 1–16
- The Admonitions of an Egyptian Sage from a Hieratic Papyrus in Leiden (Pap. Leiden 334 recto). Leipzig, 1909 (reprint Hildesheim – Zürich – New York, 1969) PDF
- A Topographical Catalogue of the Private Tombs of Thebes, with Arthur E. P. Weigall, London, Bernard Quaritch, 1913
- "New Literary Works from Ancient Egypt", Journal of Egyptian Archaeology 1 (1914), 20–36 and 100–106
- Notes on the story of Sinuhe, Paris, Librairie Honoré Champion, 1916
- "The Tomb of a much-travelled Theban Official", Journal of Egyptian Archaeology 4 (1917), 28–38
- "On Certain Participial Formations in Egyptian", Rev. ég. N.S. 2/1-2 (1920), 42–55
- "The Eloquent Peasant", JEA 9 (1923), 5–25
- "The Autobiography of Rekhmere, ZAS 60 (1925), pp. 62–76 PDF
- Egyptian Grammar: Being an Introduction to the Study of Hieroglyphics Griffith Institute, Oxford, 1927
- The Theory of Speech and Language, Oxford: Clarendon Press, 1932
- "The Earliest Manuscripts of the Instruction of Amenemmes I", Mélanges Maspero I.2, 479–496 [pdf 62]. Cairo, Imprimerie de l'Institut Français, 1934
- Ancient Egyptian Onomastica. Vols. I–III. London: Oxford University Press, 1947
- The Ramesseum Papyri. Plates (Oxford 1955)
- The Theory of Proper Names: A Controversial Essay. London; New York: Oxford University Press, 1957
- The Royal Canon of Turin, Griffith Institute, 1959
- Egypt of the Pharaohs, Oxford 1961

== See also ==
- Gardiner's Sign List
- Egyptian hieroglyphs
- Henry Balfour Gardiner (composer), his brother
- Margaret Gardiner, his daughter
- Rolf Gardiner, his son
- John Eliot Gardiner, his grandson
- Martin Bernal, his grandson
