= Spring, Sweet Spring =

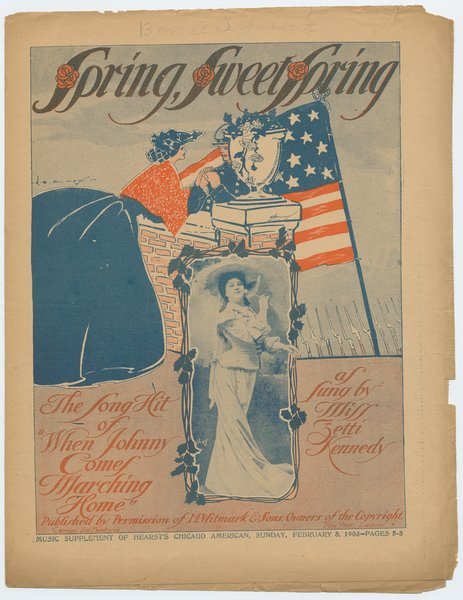
- Sheet music cover

Song
- Published: 1903
- Composer(s): Julian Edwards
- Lyricist(s): Stanislaus Stange

Spring, Sweet Spring is a song by Julian Edwards with lyrics by Stanislaus Stange and was published in 1903 by Hearst’s Chicago American.
