= Margaret Gardiner (art collector) =

British patron of artists (1904–2005)

Margaret Gardiner OBE
- Photographed c. 1932
- Born: Margaret Emilia Gardiner; 22 April 1904; Berlin
- Died: 2 January 2005 (aged 100)
- Other name: Margaret Emilia Gardiner Bernal
- Citizenship: British
- Education: Bedales School; Newnham College, Cambridge
- Partner: John Desmond Bernal
- Children: Martin Bernal
- Father: Alan Gardiner
- Relatives: Henry Rolf Gardiner (brother)

Margaret Emilia Gardiner OBE (22 April 1904 – 2 January 2005) was a radical modern British patron of artists and resident of Hampstead, London, from 1932, where she was also a left wing political activist. She was also for a time the partner of Professor John Desmond Bernal. She was known as "Mrs Bernal" for most of her life, but they were never married. In the 1980 Birthday Honours she was awarded an OBE for services to the Pier Arts Centre Trust, Stromness. She was referred to as Margaret Emilia Gardiner Bernal on the list.

== Biography ==
Gardiner was born in Berlin where her father, the Egyptologist Sir Alan Gardiner, was working at the time. In 1923 he assisted Howard Carter and Lord Carnarvon with the opening of Tutankhamun's tomb. Her mother was Hedwig (née von Rosen), Lady Gardiner, whose father was an Austro-Hungarian Roman Catholic with Jewish roots and mother a Swedish Finn. Her brother was Henry Rolf Gardiner.

Gardiner was educated at the Fröbel School in Hammersmith, then at Bedales, the liberally-minded school, followed by Newnham College, Cambridge. There she read Modern Languages, but transferred to Moral Sciences, the Cambridge term for Philosophy. Her family was wealthy and she had no need to work, devoting her life instead to politics and the arts. At Cambridge she fell in love with Bernard Deacon, a scholar at Trinity but was shattered when he died from blackwater fever whilst working on Malakula in the New Hebrides, Vanuatu in 1927 at the age of 24. She visited his grave there 56 years later and wrote a book, Footprints on Malekula: Memoir of Bernard Deacon, in 1984.

After Cambridge she spent a brief, but unsuccessful, time as a primary-school teacher in Gamlingay. Afterwards she devoted her time and energy to supporting her friends: Barbara Hepworth, Hepworth's second husband, Ben Nicholson, W. H. Auden, Berthold Lubetkin, Solly Zuckerman, Naum Gabo and others.

She made her home at 35 Downshire Hill, Hampstead, close to the Heath where she swam in the ponds into her 90s.

Her son with Bernal was Martin Bernal, author of Black Athena. Despite never marrying, Gardiner referred to herself as "Mrs Bernal". John Desmond Bernal had married Agnes Eileen Sprague, a secretary, on 21 June 1922, the day after being awarded his BA degree when he was aged 21. As well as his son with Gardiner, he had two children with Sprague and one with Margot Heinemann.

== Politics ==
With Bernal, who was a Communist, she was part of the 1930s and 40s group campaigning "For Intellectual Liberty". Gardiner was however not pressed to join the party. She spent a winter with Bernal in Moscow but had reservations about Joseph Stalin. In the 1960s she organised full-page advertisements in The Times signed by well-known people opposed to the Vietnam War. She was also a supporter of CND.

In the 1970 general election Ben Whitaker, Labour MP for Hampstead, lost his seat as a result of a far-left candidate standing whom Gardiner had financed.

== Orkney ==
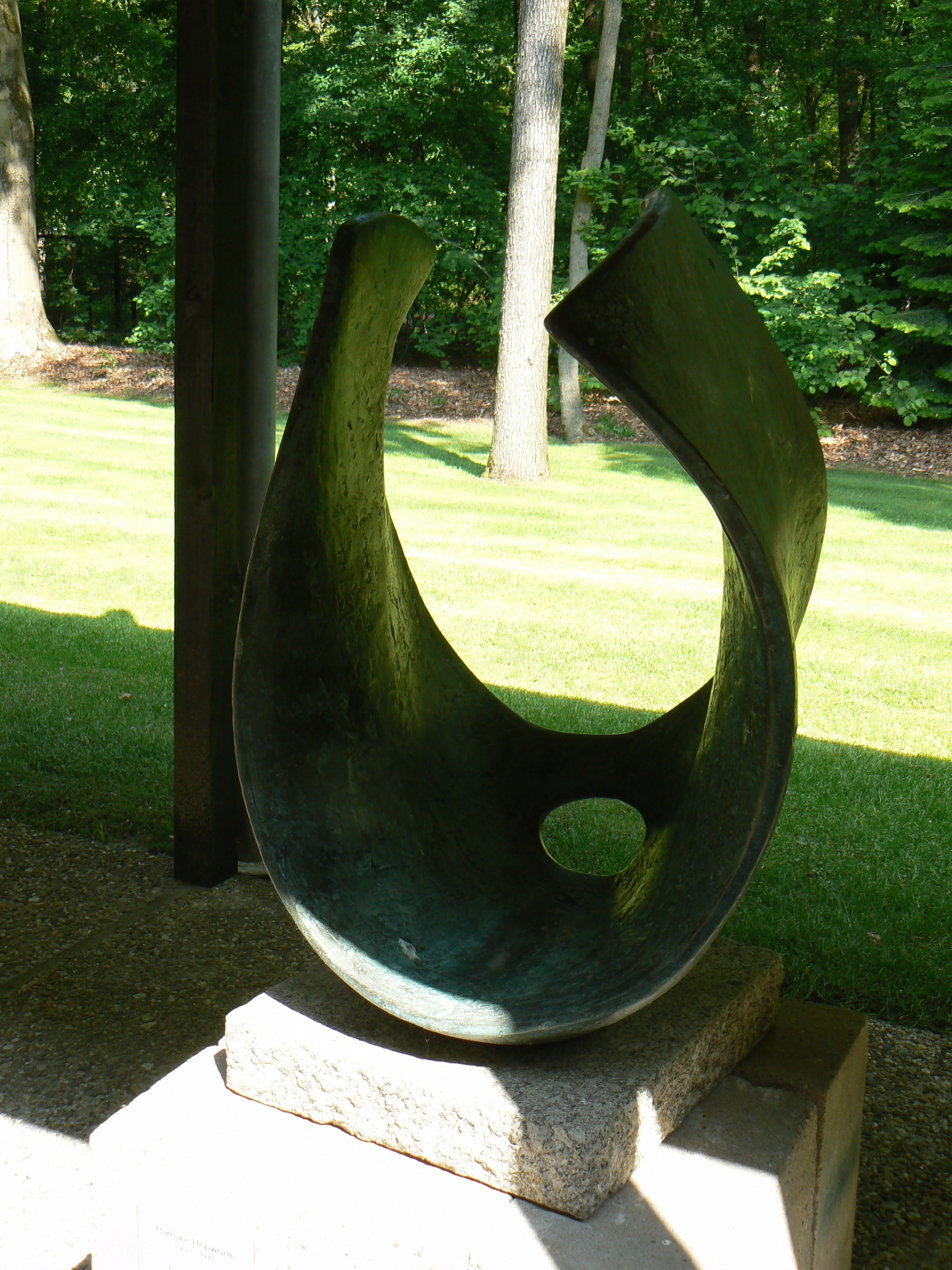
Barbara Hepworth's "Curved Form (Trevalgan)", which stood in Gardiner's back garden in Hampstead

She spent a large part of her life away from London on Rousay, Orkney, as a retreat. She was the founder, in 1979 of the art gallery, Pier Arts Centre in Stromness. One of the works there is "Curved Form (Trevalgan)" by her longtime friend Barbara Hepworth in 1956 which Gardiner kept on display in her back garden in Hampstead. The work, named after a hill in Cornwall between Zennor and St Ives, was Hepworth's first entirely bronze work. She gave 67 works of art to the people of Orkney and "Curved Form" now sits outside on the centre's pier on the original plinth from Gardiner's garden.

== Publications ==
- Barbara Hepworth: a memoir. Edinburgh: Salamander Press. 1982. ISBN 9780907540106.
- Footprints on Malekula: Memoir of Bernard Deacon. London: Chatto & Windus. 1984. ISBN 9780907540458.
- A Scatter of Memories. Free Association. 1988. ISBN 978-1-85343-043-5.
