= Iwan Knorr =

German music teacher (1853–1916)

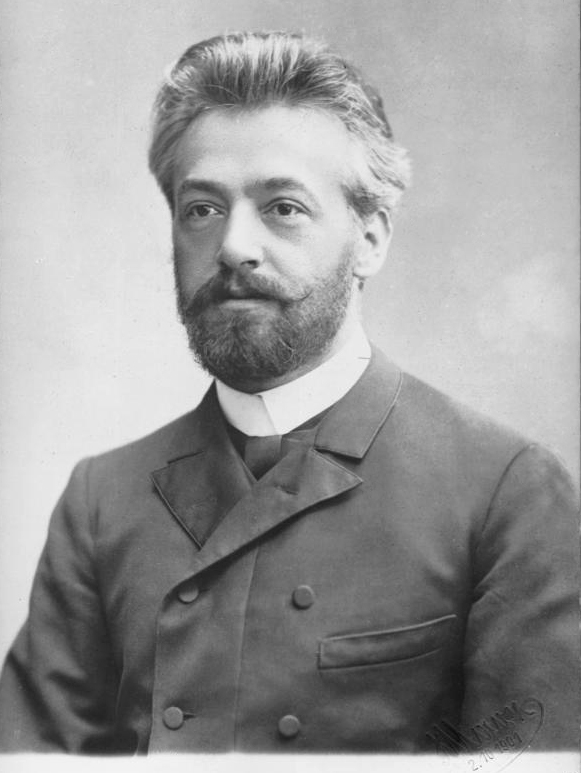
- Portrait of Knorr by Arthur Marx, 1901
- Born: Iwan Otto Armand Knorr; January 3, 1853; Gniew, Province of Prussia, Kingdom of Prussia
- Died: January 22, 1916 (aged 63); Frankfurt, Province of Hesse-Nassau, Kingdom of Prussia
- Other name: I. O. Armand
- Education: Leipzig Conservatory
- Occupations: Composer and music teacher

Iwan Otto Armand Knorr (3 January 1853 – 22 January 1916) was a German composer and music teacher.

== Life ==
A native of Gniew, Knorr was taken to southern Russia at the age of four, where he was surrounded by Russian folk music. His mother taught him piano. The family settled in Leipzig in 1868, where Knorr attended the Leipzig Conservatory, studying with Ignaz Moscheles, Ernst Friedrich Richter and Carl Reinecke. In 1874, he became a teacher and in 1878 director of music theory instruction at the Imperial Kharkiv Conservatory, in what is now Ukraine.

In 1883, he settled in Frankfurt, where he joined the faculty of the Hoch Conservatory. In 1908, he became director of the school. As a teacher he exerted great influence. Among his pupils were Bernhard Sekles, Ernest Bloch, Vladimir Sokalskyi, Ernst Toch and Hans Pfitzner, as well as the English-speaking composers such as William Beatton Moonie and friends that become known as the Frankfurt Group: Balfour Gardiner, Percy Grainger, Norman O'Neill, Roger Quilter and Cyril Scott.

His compositions include three operas, a symphony, a piano quartet and several sets of variations and suites, as well as pedagogical works of counterpoint and fugue, but he was not prolific. His 1888 piece for cello and piano, Variationen über ein Thema von K. Klimsch, has been recorded by Adrian Bradbury and Andrew West.

== Selected Compositions ==
- Variations on a theme by Robert Schumann, Op. 1 for Piano Trio
- Piano Quartet in E-flat major, Op. 3
- Variationen über ein Thema von K. Klimsch, Op. 4
- Ukrainian Liebeslieder, for vocal quartet and piano, Op. 5
- Variations on a Ukrainian Folksong, for orchestra, Op. 7
- Variations on a Russian Folksong, for piano duet, Op. 8
- Eight Songs, for mixed choir, Op. 11
- Symphonic Fantasy, Op. 12 (1899)
- Serenade in G Major, for orchestra, Op.17
- Dunja, opera in two acts, Op. 18 (premiered 1904 in Koblenz)
- Aus der Ukraine, suite for orchestra, Op. 20
- Die Hochzeit, opera (premiered 1907 in Prague)
- Durchs Fenster, opera in one act (premiered 1908 in Karlsruhe)

== Writings ==
- Tchaikovsky (Berlin, 1900)
- Materials for Teaching Harmony (Leipzig: Breitkopf, 1903; 7 impressions)
- Handbook of Fugal Composition (Leipzig, 1911)
- The Fugues of Bach's Well-Tempered Clavier in Pictorial Representation (Leipzig, 1912)
