= Ola Gorie =

Scottish jewellery designer

Ola Gorie MBE
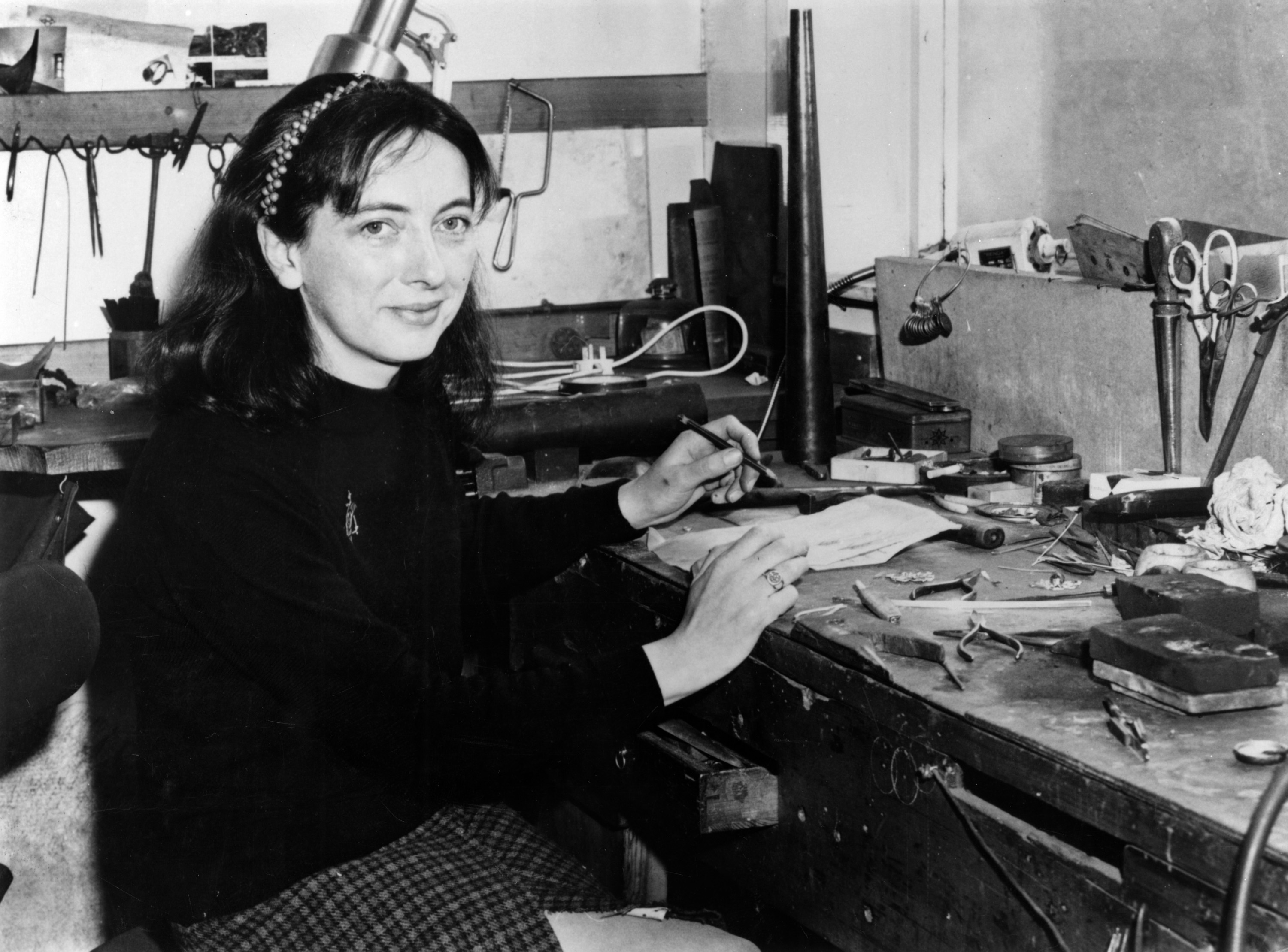
- Ola at her workbench, c. 1970
- Born: 27 October 1937 (age 88); Kirkwall, Orkney
- Education: Gray's School of Art
- Occupation: Jewellery designer
- Years active: 1960-1997

Ola Gorie (born 27 October 1937) is a Scottish jewellery designer and one of the founders of the modern craft movement in Scotland.

== Early life ==
Ola Gorie was born in Kirkwall, Orkney. Her parents, Minnie and Patrick Gorie, ran a long-established grocers and wine merchants, Kirkness & Gorie, in central Kirkwall. Despite growing up in a commercial environment, Ola decided to pursue an artistic career and attended Gray's School of Art in Aberdeen, leaving in 1960 as the first graduate of its jewellery department. While there, she shared a flat with the Orcadian painter Sylvia Wishart.

== Career ==
Ola Gorie returned to Orkney where three jewellery shops in Kirkwall agreed to sell her designs. When she took over her own shop, success came quickly. Her early designs, the first to be originated in Orkney since Viking times, drew heavily on Orkney's Norse heritage, featuring images such as the Maes Howe dragon, inspired by Viking graffiti in a Neolithic tomb. Her jewellery found quick acceptance both locally and, by the end of the sixties, across the country. Appreciation of it grew as part of the wider craft movement in Britain in general, and the Scottish Highlands in particular. Her work drew inspiration from Orkney's Norse, Pictish, Scottish and Celtic heritage and also from natural forms, and art history. Commissions for one-off pieces came from the Queen Mother, Liberty of London, the British Museum and the House of Commons.

By the time of her retirement from business, in 1997, Ola Gorie employed as many as 55 staff, and her jewellery was exported around the world. The business is now run, on a smaller scale, by Ola Gorie's daughter, textile designer Ingrid Tait, and operates out of the same premises the family business has occupied since 1859.

== Recognition ==
In 1999, Ola Gorie was awarded an MBE in recognition of her services to the jewelry industry. Other awards include winner of the Scottish Gift of the Year in 1997 (shortlisted in 1998, 1999 and 2003) and runner up in 2000's Kayman Award. She lives in Orkney, and is involved in many artistic activities.

== Retrospective exhibition ==
In November 2010, the Orkney Museum launched a retrospective exhibition, 'Celebrating 50 Years of Ola Gorie'. It ran to the end of January 2011 and confirms her importance in contemporary Orcadian culture. The exhibition brought together many of her early and iconic designs, along with designs sketches, the tools of her craft and original artefacts from the museum's collection which had inspired her, including a 2nd-century AD brooch. Another ancient piece of jewellery, the Westness Brooch, was found in a Viking boat burial on the Orkney isle of Rousay. However, her jewellery extends far beyond the Orkney influence: she was an early admirer of Charles Rennie Mackintosh and helped revive his style. The natural world of seaweed, thistles and pearls have a place in the collection too. Among the cabinets of wax moulds, account books and relics of a career was a letter from Margaret Thatcher who admired a ring.
