= Norman O'Neill (composer) =

English composer and conductor (1875–1934)

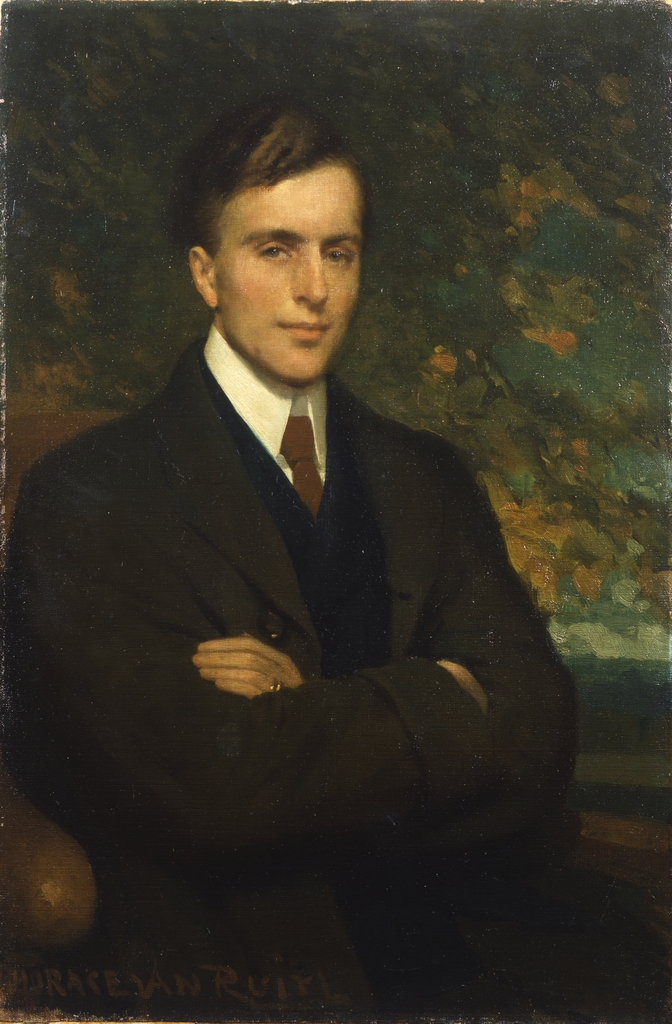
Painting by Horace van Ruith, 1898/1899

Norman Houston O'Neill (14 March 1875 – 3 March 1934) was an English composer and conductor of Irish background who specialised largely in works for the theatre.

== Life ==
O'Neill was born at 16 Young Street in Kensington, London, the youngest son of the Irish painter George Bernard O'Neill and Emma Stuart Callcott, the daughter of organist and glee composer William Hutchins Callcott. He studied in London with Arthur Somervell and with Iwan Knorr at the Hoch Conservatory in Frankfurt from 1893 to 1897. His studies there were facilitated by Eric Stenbock. He belonged to the Frankfurt Group, a circle of composers who studied at Hoch's Conservatory in the late 1890s.

He married Adine Berthe Maria Ruckert (29 July 1875 – 17 February 1947) on 2 July 1899 in Paris. Adine was a celebrated pianist (a pupil of Clara Schumann) and music teacher in her own right – she later became head music mistress at St Paul's Girls' School in Hammersmith. O'Neill began to have some success with concert music, including a 1901 performance of his overture In Autumn given at the Henry Wood Proms. In 1904 he composed the incidental music to John Martin-Harvey’s production of Hamlet at the Lyric Theatre, London. In 1909 he began his long association with the Haymarket Theatre when he was appointed music director.

O'Neill was treasurer of the Royal Philharmonic Society from 1918 until his death and taught harmony and composition at the Royal Academy of Music. A very sociable man, he was a member of the Savage Club, where he liked to meet musical colleagues. He and Adine frequently hosted fellow composers and musicians at their house, 4 Pembroke Villas in Kensington, including Frederick Delius, Theodore Holland, Gustav Holst, Ernest Irving, Percy Grainger and Cyril Scott.

On 12 February 1934 O'Neill was walking East on Oxford Street on his way to Broadcasting House for a recording session. As he crossed Holles Street he was struck by a carrier tricycle. As a result he developed blood poisoning and died on 3 March. He was cremated at Golders Green Crematorium, London, as was his wife in 1947. There is a plaque there in memory to both of them.

== Music ==
O'Neill's works for the stage include over fifty sets of incidental music for plays, including many by Shakespeare (Hamlet, King Lear, Julius Caesar, Macbeth, The Merchant of Venice, Henry V and Measure for Measure), J. M. Barrie (A Kiss for Cinderella and Mary Rose), and Maurice Maeterlinck (The Blue Bird). Mary Rose, perhaps his best received theatre score, first opened in London at the Haymarket on 22 April 1920, continuing until 26 February 1921, with Fay Compton as Mary Rose, a role which was written for her by Barrie. Ernest Irving, who deputised as conductor for O'Neill on many occasions, compared a performance of Mary Rose without his music to "a dance by a fairy with a wooden leg". The play was revived (with many of the same cast still in place) in 1926.

In 1910, O'Neill became the first British composer to conduct his own orchestral music on record, directing the Columbia Graphophone Company's house ensemble, the "Court Symphony Orchestra", in a suite taken from his Blue Bird music on two double-sided gramophone discs. He received personal congratulations from Sir Edward Elgar on his music for the innovative central ballet sequence of the 1924 revue The Punch Bowl, which ran for over a year with O'Neill's contribution being widely singled out for praise in press coverage.

His concert works include a number of symphonic suites, chamber and instrumental music, most of it written pre-war, before his theatre music career took off. There are two piano trios, Op. 9 (1900) and the single movement Op. 32 (1909), and the Piano Quintet in E minor, Op. 10. Adine O'Neill, who frequently gave first performances of her husband's piano compositions, performed the Quintet for the first time at Steinway Hall on 16 February 1903. The String Quartet in C, which has been recorded, was derived from manuscripts of various movements held at the Royal College of Music.

Solo piano works such as the Four Songs without Words and the four-movement suite In the Branches are still occasionally heard. The Deux Petites pièces, Op. 27 were recorded in 2019 by Richard Masters. Ensemble Color recorded the Cello Sonata (1896), the Piano Trio op. 7 (1900), the Soliloquy for double bass and piano (1926) and the Suite In B minor for violin and pianoforte in 2022. La Belle Dame Sans Merci (1908) for baritone and orchestra was recorded by the BBC Concert Orchestra with Roderick Williams in 2024.

== Selected works ==
=== Concert works ===
- 1895 – Variations on Pretty Polly Oliver Op. 1, for piano, violin and cello
- 1896 – Cello Sonata in A minor
- 1898 – Four Compositions for piano, Op. 4. A Norse Lullaby (song)
- 1899 – Romance in A for piano. Variations and Fugue on a Theme by A.R (Adine Rückert) for piano
- 1900 – Piano Trio in A minor, Op. 7
- 1901 – In Autumn, orchestral overture, Op. 8
- 1903 – Piano Quintet in E minor, Op. 10
- 1904 – Hamlet overture. Death on the Hills, ballade for contralto and orchestra Op. 12
- 1905 – Variations and Fugue on an Irish Air for two pianos Op. 17. Waldemar, fantasy for solo voices, chorus and orchestra, Op. 19
- 1906 – In Spring-time, orchestral overture. Six Miniatures for small orchestra. Three pieces for piano, Op. 20
- 1907 – Five Rondels for medium voice, Op. 18. Two French Songs, Op. 26
- 1908 – La Belle Dame sans Merci, baritone and full orchestra, Op. 31. Deux Petites pièces for piano, Op. 27
- 1909 – String Quartet in C Major. Piano Trio in one movement, Op. 32. Four Dances from The Blue Bird
- 1911 – A Scotch Rhapsody for full orchestra, Op. 30
- 1913 – Introduction, Mazurka and Finale Op. 43 (from A Forest Idyll)
- 1914 – Overture Humoresque for full orchestra Op. 47
- 1916 – Hornpipe, for orchestra, Op. 48 (also piano version)
- 1918 – Four Songs without Words for piano
- 1919 – Carillon for piano, Op. 50. In the Branches, piano suite
- 1920 – Prelude and Call for orchestra
- 1921 – Celtic Legend and Nocturne for violin and piano. Eight 18th Century dance arrangements for piano
- 1922 – Come Away, Come, Away, Death, part song for mixed voices
- 1924 – Blossom Songs (from the Japanese) with piano quartet
- 1926 – Echoes of Erin: Twelve Irish songs
- 1926 – Soliloquy for double bass and piano
- 1927 – Festal Prelude for orchestra (also piano version)
- 1928 – Two Shakespearean Sketches: Nocturne and Masquerade for orchestra
- 1930 – The Farmer and the Fairies (Asquith), recitation

=== Music for the stage ===
- 1901 – After All (Lytton)
- 1903 – The Exile (Lloyd Osbourne and Austin Strong, Royalty Theatre)
- 1904 – Hamlet (Lyric Theatre)
- 1906 – A Lonely Queen (Carr)
- 1908 – The Bride of Lammermoor (Scott)
- 1909 – King Lear. The Blue Bird (Maeterlinck)
- 1911 – The Gods of the Mountain (Lord Dunsany)
- 1912 – The Golden Doom (Lord Dunsany)
- 1913 – The Pretenders (Ibsen). Lord Haaken’s Lullaby (Elkin)
- 1916 – Hiawatha (Kegan). Paddly Pools (Malleson)
- 1917 – Before Dawn, ballet (Lyric Theatre)
- 1918 – Through the Green Door (Vernon)
- 1919 – Reparation (Tolstoy). Julius Caesar
- 1920 – Mary Rose (Barrie). Macbeth (Aldwych Theatre)
- 1921 – The Knave of Diamonds (Dell). The Love Thief (Fernald). Quality Street (Barrie). The Snow Queen (ballet)
- 1922 – The Merchant of Venice (David Belasco’s production, Lyceum Theatre, New York)
- 1924 – Punch and Judy ballet for The Punch Bowl Revue. A Kiss for Cinderella (Barrie)
- 1925 – Kismet (Knoblock, New Oxford Theatre). The Man with a Load of Mischief (Ashley Dukes)
- 1926 – Alice in Wonderland, ballet
- 1929 – Measure for Measure (Haymarket Theatre)
- 1930 – Jewels (Rodgers)
- 1933 – Julius Caesar. The Merchant of Venice. Henry V. (all Manchester Hippodrome)
