= Te lucis ante terminum =

Latin Hymn

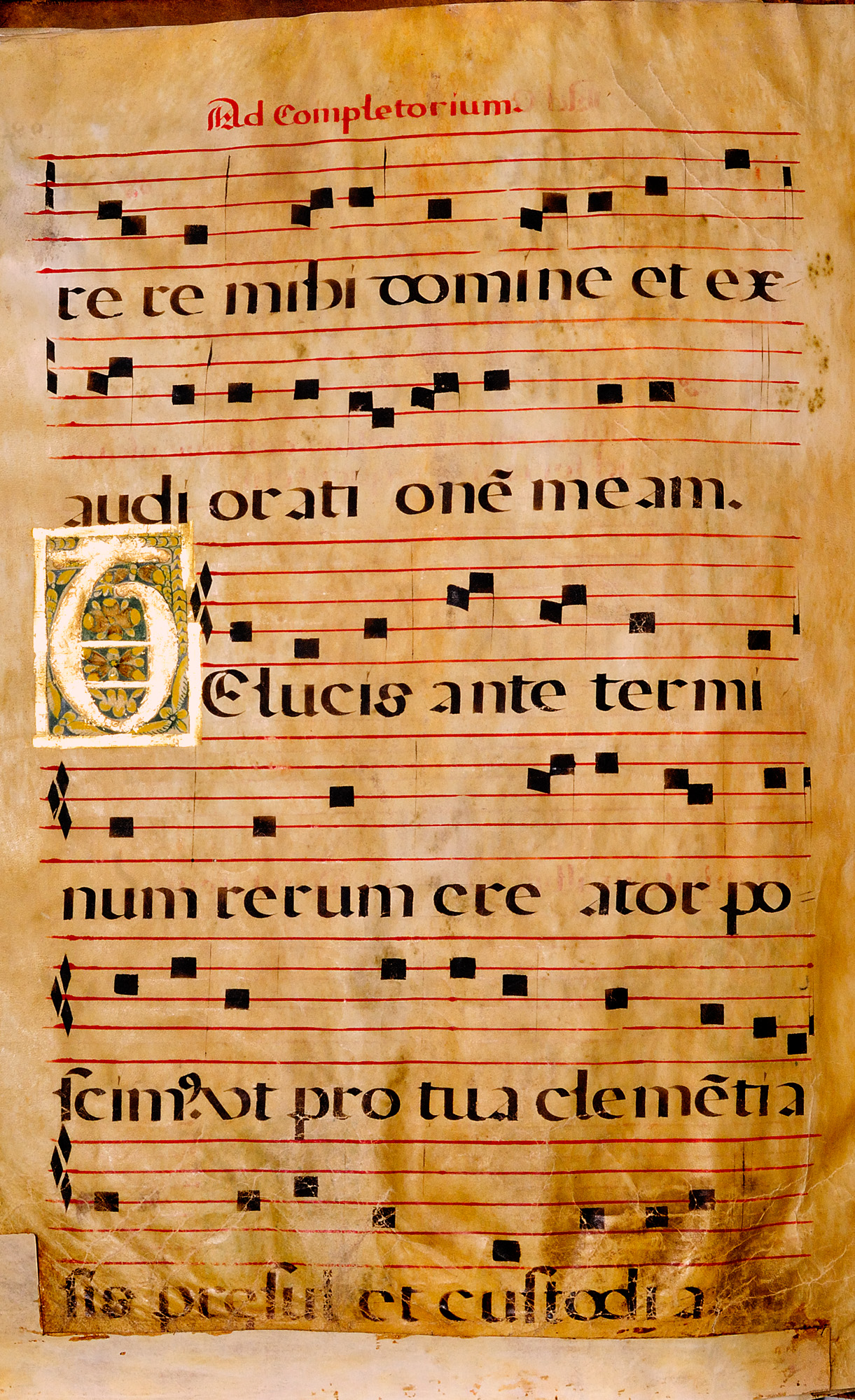
Te lucis in a Spanish manuscript circa 1625, with pro tua clementia (instead of solita clementia) due to Urban VIII's classicizing revisions. The original Latin is used in post-Vatican II texts.

Te lucis ante terminum ('To Thee before the close of day') is an old Latin hymn in long metre. It is the hymn at Compline in the Roman Breviary.

== Origin ==
S.-G. Pimont argued for the authorship of Ambrose of Milan. The Benedictine editors and Luigi Biraghi disagreed.

The hymn is found in a hymnary in Irish script (described by Clemens Blume in his Cursus, etc.) of the eighth or early ninth century; but the classical prosody of its two stanzas (solita in the third line of the original text is the only exception) suggests a much earlier origin. In this hymnary it is assigned, together with the hymn Christe qui splendor et dies (also known as Christe qui lux es et dies), to Compline.

An earlier arrangement (as shown by the Rule of Caesarius of Arles, c. 502) coupled with the Christe qui lux the hymn Christe precamur adnue, and assigned both to the "twelfth hour" of the day for alternate recitation throughout the year. The later introduction of the Te lucis suggests a later origin.

The two hymns Te lucis and Christe qui lux did not maintain everywhere the same relative position; the latter was used in winter, the former in summer and on festivals; while many cathedrals and monasteries replaced the Te lucis by the Christe qui lux from the first Sunday of Lent to Passion Sunday or Holy Thursday, a custom followed by the Dominicans. The old Breviary of the Carthusians used the Christe qui lux throughout the year. The Roman Breviary assigns the Te lucis daily throughout the year, except from Holy Thursday to the Friday after Easter, inclusively. Merati, in his notes on Galvanus' Thesaurus, says that it has always held without variation this place in the Roman Church. As it is sung daily, the Vatican Antiphonary gives it many plainsong settings for the varieties of season and rite.

== Text ==
Latin text (original)

Te lucis ante terminum,
Rerum Creator poscimus,
Ut solita clementia
Sis præsul ad custodiam.

Procul recedant somnia,
Et noctium phantasmata;
Hostemque nostrum comprime,
Ne polluantur corpora.

Præsta, Pater omnipotens,
Per Iesum Christum Dominum,
Qui tecum in perpetuum
Regnat cum Sancto Spiritu. Amen.

Free English translation by J. M. Neale

Before the ending of the day,
Creator of the world, we pray
That with thy wonted favor, Thou
Would'st be our guard and keeper now.

From all ill dreams defend our eyes,
From nightly fears and fantasies;
Tread under foot our ghostly foe,
That no pollution we may know.

O Father, that we ask be done,
Through Jesus Christ, Thine only Son;
Who, with the Holy Ghost and Thee,
Shall live and reign eternally. Amen.

=== Alternative ===
The 1632 Urban VIII version makes classicizing revisions.

Latin text (Urban VIII)

Te lucis ante terminum,
Rerum Creator poscimus,
Ut pro tua clementia
Sis præsul et custodia.

Procul recedant somnia,
Et noctium phantasmata;
Hostemque nostrum comprime,
Ne polluantur corpora.

Præsta, Pater piissime,
Patrique compar Unice,
Cum Spiritu Paraclito
Regnans per omne sæculum. Amen.

The 1974 revision replaces the second strophe with the following two strophes from the hymn Christe precamur adnue. (Note: The relevant text of Christe precamur adnue may be found in A. S. Walpole's Early Latin Hymns, pp. 256–257.)

Latin text	English verse translation
Te corda nostra sómnient, te per sopórem séntiant, tuámque semper glóriam vicína luce cóncinant. Vitam salúbrem tríbue nostrum calórem réfice, tætram noctis calíginem tua collústret cláritas.	Lord, when we sleep, be in our hearts, Your Spirit peace and rest imparts; Then, with the light of dawn, may we Your glory praise unendingly. Your living power breathe from above, Renew in us the fire of love; And may your brightness drive away All darkness in eternal day.
