= Emil Kreuz =

German musician (1867–1932)

Emil Anton Joseph Friedrich Kreuz, also known as Emil Frederick Thornfield (25 May 1867 – 3 December 1932) was a German violinist, violist, teacher, conductor and composer.

== Biography ==
Emil Kreuz was born in Elberfeld near Wuppertal, began playing violin at an early age and studied under Georg Joseph Japha (1835–1892) in Cologne from the age of ten. At sixteen he won a scholarship at the Royal College of Music in London, where he studied violin with Henry Holmes and composition with Charles Villiers Stanford until 1888. For two years he concentrated his studies on the viola, making his debut as soloist with Hector Berlioz's Harold en Italie in December 1888 at one of the London Symphony Concerts established by George Henschel.

He became well known in England. He was violin soloist at the Leeds Festival in 1889, violist of the Gompertz Quartet along with violinists Richard Gompertz, Haydn Inwards and cellist Charles Ould from 1888 to 1903, and a member of the Covent Garden Opera Orchestra from 1900 to 1903. In 1903, he became assistant musical director of the Covent Garden Opera and joined The Hallé to study conducting with its principal conductor Hans Richter. He then turned his attentions toward operatic work, especially the training of singers and conducting.

Kreuz composed many works including pedagogical works for violin and viola, a viola concerto, songs, and chamber music, notably the Prize Quintet for horn (or viola) and string quartet, Op. 49.

He died in London.

== Selected works ==
- 4 Gesänge for tenor and piano, Op. 1 (published 1889). Includes Am fernen Horizonte; Jung sterben: Soll ich denn sterben; Mädchen mit dem rothen Mündchen; Vorsatz: Ich will dir's nimmer sagen.
- 4 Lieder for soprano or tenor and piano, Op. 3 (published 1889). Includes O süß' Vielliebchen; O wär' mein Lieb' der Fliederbusch; Schlaf, du liebes Kind; Daß du mich liebst, das wußt' ich.
- Liebesbilder, 3 pieces for viola (or violin) and piano, Op. 5 (1885)
- Frühlingsgedanken, 3 pieces for viola (or violin) and piano, Op. 9 (c.1886)
- Der Violaspieler: Sammlung von progressiv geordneten Stücken für Viola und Klavier, Op. 13 (c.1887). Includes 1: 12 Very Easy Pieces; 2: Progressive and Easy Pieces; 3 & 4: 20 Progressive Melodies; 5: 3 Easy Sketches; 6: Sonata in A minor.
- Scales and Arpeggios for the Violin through All the Major and Minor Keys, Systematically Arranged, Bowed and Fingered, 2 volumes (c.1887); also a version for viola
- 5 Songs for a soprano and piano, Op. 15 (1891); words by Thomas Campbell, Edward Oxenford and Percy Bysshe Shelley
- 6 Duets for soprano, mezzo-soprano and piano, Op. 16 (1891); words by Lewis Novra, Robert Haynes Cave and Joseph Freiherr von Eichendorff
- Concerto in C minor for viola and orchestra, Op. 20 (1885)
- Trio in C major for violin, viola and piano, Op. 21 (1885)
- 20 Children's Songs with piano accompaniment (published 1892)
- 30 Melodies for violin and piano, Op. 25 (published 1894)
- Here's the Bower for voice and piano, Op. 27 No. 2 (published 1893); words by Thomas Moore
- 4 Pieces for violin and piano, Op. 28 (1895). Includes Elegy; Scherzo; Romance; Tarantella.
- 6 leichte Stücke (6 Easy Pieces) for violin and piano, Op. 30 (1895)
- Trio facile in G for violin, cello and piano, Op. 31 (1895?)
- Trio facile in C for violin, viola and piano, Op. 32 (1896)
- Progressive Studies for the Violin, Op. 34 (1895)
- 6 Easy Pieces for violin and piano, Op. 36 (1896)
- Suite for string orchestra, Op. 38 (1895). Movements: 1. Prelude; 2. Allemande; 3. Gigue; 4. Intermezzo; 5. Scherzo; 6. Finale.
- 4 Duos for violin and viola, Op. 39 (1895)
- Progressive Studies for the Viola with Accompaniment of a Second Viola, Op. 40 (1896)
- String Quartet in D minor, Op. 42 (1896)
- Capriccio for string quartet, Op. 43 (1896)
- Cavatina in E♭ major and Chant D'Amour for violin and piano, Op. 44 (published 1896–1897)
- Suite de pièces for viola and piano, Op. 45 (1897). Movements: 1. Prélude; 2. Nocturne; 3. Le Rêve; 4. Danse rustique.
- Rêverie in B♭ major for violin and piano (1897)
- Teutonische Stücke for violin and piano (published 1898)
- Russische Tänze for violin and piano, Op. 47 (1900)
- Norwegische Tänze for violin and piano, Op. 48 (1900)
- Prize Quintet in E♭ major for horn (or viola) and string quartet, Op. 49
- First Steps for the Violin (First Position Only), Easy and Progressive Studies and a Collection of Melodious Pieces for Violin solo, and Violin and Piano, 2 volumes, Op. 53
- 4 Old English Country Dances for violin and piano (published 1909)
- Conversation amoureuse, valse caprice for violin and piano (or orchestra) (published 1914)

Book

- Dramatic Singing and Opera in English (1909)
