= Lazzaro Uzielli =

Italian pianist and music educator

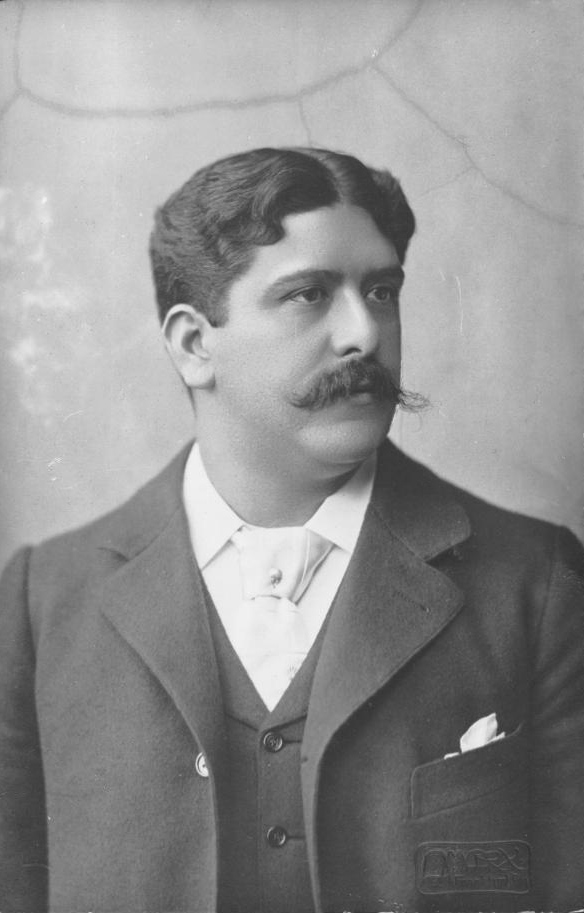
Lazzaro Uzielli

Lazzaro Uzielli (4 February 1861 − 8 October 1943) was an Italian pianist and music educator.

== Life ==
Born in Florence to a banking family, Uzielli studied in his home town with Luigi Vannuccini und Giuseppe Buonamici, then with Ernst Rudorff in Berlin, and with Clara Schumann and Joachim Raff at Dr. Hoch's Konservatorium in Frankfurt.

From 1883 to 1907 he worked as a teacher at Dr. Hoch's, and then followed a call to the Hochschule für Musik Köln. In his long years as a teacher he had numerous students who became important pianists. He undertook numerous concert tours through Germany, Austria, Switzerland, Italy and the Netherlands. He was the pianist of the 'Cologne Trio,' which also included Bram Eldering, violinist, and the cellist Friedrich_Grützmacher, and after the latter's death, Emanuel Feuermann.

He married Julia Hearing, a notable opera singer in Frankfurt. Together they had three children, Guido, Mario and Alberto Uzielli, who himself became a notable musician in Argentina.

Lazzaro Uzielli died in Bonn aged 82.

== Well-known students ==
Uzielli's students included:

- Fritz Busch
- Hubert Giesen
- Alfred Hoehn
- Hans Knappertsbusch
- Karl Hermann Pillney
- Cyril Scott
- Bernhard Sekles
- William Steinberg
- Eduard Zuckmayer
- Albert Luig

== Literature ==
- Joseph Walk (ed.): Kurzbiographien zur Geschichte der Juden 1918–1945. Edited by Leo Baeck Institute, Jerusalem. Saur, Munich 1988, ISBN 3-598-10477-4.
- Zvi Asaria (ed. and Rabbiner der Synagogengemeinde Köln): Die Juden in Köln. Von den ältesten Zeiten bis zur Gegenwart. Verlag J. P. Bachem, Cologne 1959.
