= Cyril Scott =

English composer and writer (1879–1970)

- Born: Cyril Meir Scott; 27 September 1879; Oxton, Merseyside, Cheshire, England
- Died: 31 December 1970 (aged 91)
- Education: Hoch Conservatory
- Occupations: Composer; writer; poet; occultist
- Years active: 1899–1969
- Organization: Frankfurt Group
- Style: Classical; opera; ballet; incidental; choral; chamber
- Spouse: Rose Allatini (1921-1939)
- Website: www.cyrilscott.net

Cyril Meir Scott (27 September 1879 – 31 December 1970) was an English composer, writer, poet, and occultist. He created around four hundred musical compositions including piano, violin, cello concertos, symphonies, and operas. He also wrote around 20 pamphlets and books on occult topics and natural health.

== Biography ==
Scott was born in Oxton, Cheshire, to Henry Scott (1843–1918), a shipper and scholar of Greek and Hebrew, and Mary (née Griffiths), an amateur pianist of Welsh origin. He showed a talent for music from an early age and was sent to the Hoch Conservatory in Frankfurt, Germany, to study piano in 1892 at age 12. He studied with Iwan Knorr and belonged to the Frankfurt Group, a circle of composers who studied at the Hoch Conservatory in the late 1890s. At age 20, Scott was helped by the German poet Stefan George to organize a performance of his first symphony. He played his Piano Quartet with Fritz Kreisler, Emil Kreuz and Ludwig Lebell in St. James' Hall in 1903.

In 1902, he met the pianist Evelyn Suart, with whom he had a long artistic association. She championed his music, premiering many of his works and introducing him to Elkin, a publisher with whom he remained for the rest of his life. Suart was also a Christian Scientist, and it was through her that Scott became interested in metaphysics. Scott dedicated his Scherzo, Op. 25 to her.

In May 1921 Scott married the Austrian-British novelist Rose Laure Allatini, who shared his enthusiasm for Theosophy. They had two children, Vivian Mary and Desmond Cyril, but separated in 1939.

== Music ==
His experiments in free rhythm, generated by expanding musical motifs, above all in his First Piano Sonata of 1909, appear to have exerted an influence on Stravinsky's The Rite of Spring (see The Cyril Scott Companion, pp. 45–47). He used to be known as the "English Debussy", though this reflected little knowledge of Scott and little understanding of Debussy.

== Alternative medicine ==
Scott had an interest in alternative medicine, health foods, occultism, naturopathy, philosophy and yoga. In a series of books and pamphlets, he urged the sick, even those with cancer, to trust diet and alternative medicine and avoid trained medics and surgery. Scott was an alternative cancer treatment advocate and authored two works on this subject. He also recommended people to consume black molasses and cider vinegar.

== Selected compositions ==
=== Dramatic ===
==== Opera ====
- The Alchemist (1917–18)
- The Saint of the Mountain (1924–25)
- The Shrine (c. 1925–26)
- Maureen O'Mara (1945)

==== Ballet ====
- The Incompetent Apothecary (1923)
- Karma (1924)
- Masque of the Red Death (1930)

==== Incidental music ====
- Othello (1920)
- Return to Nature (1920)
- Smetse Smee (c. 1925–26)
- Susannah and the Elders (1937)

=== Orchestral ===
- Symphony No. 1 in G major (1899)
- Pelleas and Melisanda, overture, Op. 5 (1900) [later revised as Op. 20]
- Lyric Suite, Op. 6 (1900)
- Heroic Suite, Op. 7 (c. 1900)
- Christmas Overture (c. 1900)
- Symphony No. 2 in A minor (1901–02) [withdrawn and revised as Three Symphonic Dances]
- Princess Maleine, overture, Op. 18 (1902) [withdrawn and revised as Festival Overture]
- Aglavaine et Sélysette, overture, Op. 21 (c. 1902)
- Rhapsody for orchestra No. 1, Op. 32 (1904)
- Aubade, Op. 77 (1905, revised c. 1911)
- Three Symphonic Dances, Op. 22 (c. 1907) [revised from Symphony No. 2]
- Egypt, ballet suite (1913)
- Two Passacaglias on Irish Themes (1914)
- Britain's War March (1914)
- Suite Fantastique, for chamber orchestra (c. 1928)
- Neptune, poem of the sea (1933, revised 1935) [originally titled Disaster at Sea]
- Symphony No. 3, The Muses, with chorus (1937)
- Ode descantique, for string orchestra (c. 1940)
- Hourglass Suite, for chamber orchestra (c. 1949)
- Symphony No. 4 (1951–52)
- Neapolitan Rhapsody (1959)
- Sinfonietta for organ, harp and strings (1962)

=== Concertante works ===
- Piano Concerto in D major, Op. 10 (1900)
- Cello Concerto, Op. 19 (1902)
- Piano Concerto No. 1 (1913–14)
- Violin Concerto (c. 1925)
- Philomel, for cello and orchestra (c. 1925)
- Double concerto for violin, cello and orchestra (1926)
- The Melodist and the Nightingale, for cello and orchestra (1929)
- Early One Morning for piano and orchestra (1930–31, revised 1962)
- Concertino for two pianos and orchestra (1931)
- Double concerto for two violins and orchestra (1931)
- Passacaglia Festevole, for two pianos and orchestra (c. 1935)
- Cello Concerto (1937)
- Concerto for harpsichord and orchestra (1937)
- Concerto for oboe and strings (1946)
- Concertino for bassoon, flute and strings (1951)
- Piano Concerto No. 2 (1958)

=== Choral music ===
- Magnificat, for soloists, chorus orchestra and organ (1899)
- The Ballad of Fair Helen of Kirkonnel, for baritone, chorus and orchestra, Op. 8 (1900)
- My Captain, for voice and piano, Op. 38 (1904)
- Nativity Hymn, for soloists, chorus and orchestra (1913–14)
- La belle dame sans merci, for baritone, chorus and orchestra (1915–17)
- Festival Overture, for chorus and orchestra (1929)
- Mystic Ode, for chorus and chamber orchestra (1932)
- Summerland, for chorus and orchestra (1935)
- Ode to Great Men, for tenor, female chorus and orchestra (1936)
- Hymn to Unity, for soloists, chorus and orchestra (1947)

=== Chamber music ===
- Piano Trio in E minor, Op. 3 (c. 1899)
- Piano Quartet in E minor, Op. 16 (1899)
- String Quartet, Op. 12 (c. 1900)
- Sextet for piano and strings, Op. 26 (c. 1903, rev. 1914 as Quintet, performed and later withdrawn)
- String Quartet, Op. 28 (c. 1903)
- String Quartet in F major, Op. 31 (c. 1904)
- Violin Sonata No. 1 in C major, Op. 59 (1908)
- String Quartet No. 1 (1919)
- String Quintet No. 1 (1919)
- Piano Trio No. 1 (c. 1920, publ. 1922)
- Piano Quintet No. 1 (1920, publ. 1924, previous Quintets had been performed, but later withdrawn)
- Quintet for flute, harp, violin, viola and cello (1926)
- String Trio No. 1 (1931)
- Sonata Lirica for violin and piano (1937)
- Viola Sonata (1939, revised 1953)
- String Trio No. 2 (1949)
- Piano Trio No. 2 (1950)
- Violin Sonata No. 2, Sonata Melodica (1950)
- Cello Sonata (1950)
- String Quartet No. 2 (1951)
- Quintet for clarinet and strings (1951)
- Piano Quintet No. 2 (1952)
- String Quintet No. 2 (1953)
- Violin Sonata No. 3 (1955)
- Trio for clarinet, cello and piano (c. 1955)
- Violin Sonata No. 4 (1956)
- Piano Trio No. 3 (1957)
- String Quartet No. 3 (1961)
- Flute Sonata (1961)
- Trio Pastorale for flute, cello and piano (1961)
- String Quartet No. 4 (1964)

=== Piano solo ===
- Piano Sonata in D major, Op.17 (1901)(W 329)
  - Handelian Rhapsody, for piano (revision, ed. Percy Grainger), Op. 17 (1909)(W 134)
- Scherzo, Op.25 (1904)
- 2 Pierrot Pieces, Op.35 (1904)
- 2 Piano Pieces, Op.37 (1904)
- Solitude, Op.40–1 (1904)
- Vesperale, Op.40–2 (1904)
- Chimes, Op.40–3 (1904)
- Lotus Land, Op.47–1 (1905)
- Columbine, Op.47–2 (1905)
- Summerland, Op.54 (1907)
- 2 Alpine Sketches, Op.58 (1908)
- Dance Nègre, Op. 58-5 (1908)
- Sphinx, Op.63 (1908)
- Piano Sonata No.1, Op.66 (1909)
- 4 Piano Pieces, Op.67 (1909–10)
- Piano Suite, Op.71–1 (1910)
- Water-Wagtail (1910)
- Berceuse in E-flat (1911)
- Pierrette (1912)
- 3 British Melodies (1912)
- Rainbow Trout (1916)
- Piano Sonata No.2 (1935)
- Piano Sonata No.3 (1956)

=== Other instrumental solo ===
- The Ecstatic Shepherd, for solo flute (c. 1922)
- Celtic Fantasy, for solo harp (1926)
- Sonatina, for solo guitar (c. 1927) (commissioned by Andrés Segovia)
- Idyll, for solo violin (1928)

== Literature ==
=== Prose ===
- 1917: The Philosophy of Modernism, in its Connection with Music
- 1920: The Initiate: Some Impressions of a Great Soul (Anon.)
- 1920: The Adept of Galilee – A Story and an Argument (Anon.)
- 1924: Autobiography: My Years of Indiscretion
- 1927: The Initiate in the New World (Anon.)
- 1928: The Art of Making a Perfect Husband
- 1930: Childishness: A Study in Adult Conduct
- 1932: The Initiate in the Dark Cycle (Anon.)
- 1933: Vision of the Nazarene (Anon.)
- 1933: Music: Its Secret Influence Throughout the Ages (new editions, 1950, 1958, 1969, 2013)
- 1936: The Greater Awareness
- 1939: Man is my Theme
- 1939: The Ghost of a Smile
- 1942: The Christian Paradox
- 1952: Die Tragoedie Stefan George
- 1953: Man the Unruly Child
- 1953: Simpler and Safer Remedies for Grievous Ills
- 1953: The Boy Who Saw True
- 1969: Autobiography: Bone of Contention

=== Alternative medicine ===
- 1939: Victory Over Cancer: Without Radium Or Surgery
- 1940: Health, Diet and Commonsense
- 1938: Doctors, Disease and Health
- 1946: Crude Black Molasses
- 1946: Medicine, Rational and Irrational
- 1948: Cider Vinegar
- 1953: Simpler and Safer Remedies for Grievous Ills
- 1955: Sleeplessness: Its Prevention and Cure by Harmless Methods
- 1956: Constipation and Commonsense
- 1968: Cancer Prevention: Fallacies and Some Reassuring Facts

=== Occultism ===
- 1935: Outline of Modern Occultism
- 1957: Occultism: An Alternative to Scientific Humanism

=== Poetry ===
- 190?: The Shadows of Silence and the Songs of Yesterday
- 1907: The Grave of Eros and the Book of Mournful Melodies
- 1909: Translation: The Flowers of Evil (Charles Baudelaire)
- 1910: Translation: Poems of Stefan George (Selections from his Works)
- 1910: The Voice of the Ancient
- 1912: The Vales of Unity
- 1915: The Celestial Aftermath: A Springtime of the Heart and Faraway Songs
- 1943: The Poems of playboy

== Bibliography ==
- Hull, A. Eaglefield: Cyril Scott. Composer, Poet and Philosopher. London, 1918.
- Scott, Cyril: Bone of Contention: the Autobiography of Cyril Scott. New York, 1969.
- Sampsel, Laurie J.: Cyril Scott: A Bio-Bibliography. Greenwood, 2000.
- Collins, Sarah. The Aesthetic Life of Cyril Scott. Boydell, 2013.
- Scott, Desmond, and others (edd.), The Cyril Scott Companion. Boydell, 2018.

== See also ==
- Theosophy and literature § Theosophists as fiction writers
- The Initiate, by Cyril Scott
