= Annesley Black =

Canadian composer

Annesley Black (born 8 September 1979 in Ottawa, Ontario) is a Canadian composer based in Germany and Austria. Her works span from instrumental music to electronics and video performances, from orchestra and chamber music to theatre, solo performances and installations. She has appeared as a performer, improviser and sound-director.

== Career ==
After studying jazz and electronic music at Concordia University in Montreal Annesley Black received her bachelor's degree in musical composition in 2004 from McGill University in Montreal under Brian Cherney. She studied composition 2004–2006 with York Höller and Hans-Ulrich Humpert at the Hochschule für Musik Köln. She completed her studies in composition with Mathias Spahlinger, electronic music with Orm Finnendahl and applied music with Cornelius Schwehr at the Hochschule für Musik Freiburg (Diplom Dec. 2008).

Among her many awards and distinctions are a scholarship and award from the Darmstadt International Summer Courses for New Music (2004/2006), the Busoni Composition Prize (Förderpreis) of the Academy of Arts, Berlin (2008), the Stuttgart Composition Prize (2009) and the Ernst von Siemens Composer Prize (2019). She was also a fellow at the Academy of Arts, Berlin in 2009 and since 2018 has been a member of this institution.

Her pieces have been performed in Germany, Canada and other countries by various ensembles including Ensemble Modern, Ensemble ascolta, ensemble mosaik, Ensemble SurPlus, Nouvel Ensemble Moderne, Tsilumos Ensemble, ensemble contemporain de Montréal, Quintett Boréale, Composers Slide Quartet and hr-Sinfonieorchester in such festivals as Warsaw Autumn, Ultraschall Festival Berlin, Darmstadt Summer Courses, ECLAT Festival Stuttgart, Donaueschingen Festival, Wittener Tage für neue Kammermusik, SALT New Music Festival in Victoria, British Columbia, Ottawa Chamber Music Festival. Her music theatre Solopoly for five percussionists was premiered at the National Theatre Mannheim in May 2015. A sound, a narrow, a channel, an inlet, the straits, the barrens, the stretch of a neck for large spatialised orchestra was premiered in February 2024 at the Liederhalle Stuttgart.

From 2008 to 2011, Annesley Black performed as a Sound Engineer Assistant for the SWR Experimental Studio for recordings and concerts and from 2012 to 2020, she was board member of the German Society for Electroacoustic Music (DEGEM).

She was lecturer at Kronberg Academy in Frankfurt a. M. (2013–2016), at Dr. Hoch's Konservatorium in Frankfurt am Main (2014–2020) and at Hochschule für Musik und Darstellende Kunst Frankfurt a. M. (2016–2022). From 2022 to 2024, Black was Professor for Composition with New Media at Hochschule für Musik Würzburg. In 2023, Black was appointed Professor for Composition at the Universität für Musik und darstellende Kunst Graz.

Annesley Black lives in Graz/Austria.

== Works (selection) ==
=== Solo music ===
- maiko for solo viola (2006)
- aorko for solo viola and three loudspeakers (2006/09)
- 4238 De Bullion for Piano with live processing of video and sound (2007/08)
- scissors for trombone (2008)
- a piece that is a size that is recognised as not a size but a piece for piano (2013)
- stiff upper lip for bass clarinet (2014)
- Innermost tidings of the tube for flute, endoscopic camera and live projection (2018)
- immolate yourself on the wires II for No-Input Mixer (2021)
- Hurry up the machine. I HAVE STRUCK A BIG BONANZA für Behringer D oder Minimoog Synthesizer (2022)

=== Chamber music ===
- FIGHT for flute, oboe, clarinet, bassoon and horn (2002/03)
- Folds Dependent for string quartet (2003)
- Miniature for saxophone quartet (2005)
- LAUF for flute, oboe, clarinet, percussion, piano, violin, viola, violoncello and double bass (2005)
- Rock Paper Scissors for bass clarinet, trombone and double bass (2006)
- Smooche de la Rooche II for 3 athletically inclined percussionists and prepared electronics (2007)
- Anstalt. Musik zum Film "Kino Eye" Dziga Vertov (Kapitel 6) [Music to the film "Kino Eye Dziga Vertov (chapter 6)] for chamber ensemble (oboe, clarinet, horn, piano, percussion, violin, violoncello, double bass) (2007)
- Humans in Motion for trumpet, trombone, guitar/banjo, piano, 2 percussionists and violoncello (2007/08)
- Moment – performatives Spazieren. Musik zum Film von Yukihiro Taguchi for violin, percussion and piano (2009)
- tender pink descender for 2 contrabass clarinets (2009)
- Industrial Drive for trombone quartet (2010)
- Moment – Curitiba – Vorspiel for flugelhorn, euphonium, piano, 2 percussionists, guitar and violoncello (2010)
- Earle Brown's Forgotten Piece in Moholy-Nagy's Light-Space-Modulator for piano and live-sequenced sounds and video (2012)
- Jenny's last Rock for flute, oboe, clarinet, saxophone, percussion, piano, violin, viola, violoncello and tape (2012/13)
- GURU GURU – Doppelrequiem für Karlheinz Stockhausen und Steve Jobs for trumpet, trombone, 2 percussionists, piano/sampler, electric guitar, violoncello and live electronics (collaborative composition with Robin Hoffmann) (2013)
- ROOMS for tenor saxophone, piano/toy piano, guitar, viola and live electronics (2015)
- HAMMER HAMMER for pianist, percussion and live-electronics (2017)
- not thinking about the elephants for saxophone quartet (SATB) and live electronics (2018)
- scrap for saxophone, trombone, accordion, piano, cello and live electronics (2019)

=== Ensemble / Orchestra ===
- Snow Job for ensemble (flute, oboe, clarinet, saxophone, percussion, piano, violin, viola, violoncello), light sequencer (2010)
- misinterpreting the 2008 south sudanese budget reform for the orchestra for orchestra (4 fl, 3 ob, 3 cl, 3 bn, 4 hn, 3 tr, 3 trb, timp, 3 perc, 2 hp, strings: 14-12-10-8-6) (2012)
- peripheral exploder for ensemble and dancer (2019/2020)
- screaming sisters for ensemble and live electronics (2022)
- A sound, a narrow, a channel, an inlet, the straits, the barrens, the stretch of a neck for large spatialised orchestra (2023)

=== Stage works ===
- Flowers of Carnage – a Kung-Fu performance for musicians (professionals or non-professionals), performers, electronics/live electronics (2013/14)
- Solopoly for five percussionists (2015)
- listening to Vuntut Gwitchin (2017). Music-Theatre for 6 musicians, 2 speakers/actors and video (2017)

=== Electronic music ===
- Don't spray snow on the other person's grave sound installation for 16 loudspeakers (2009/10)
- pull the plug – Las Vegas and Venice, a comparative study sound and video installation with Sophie Narr (2009/10)

== Discography ==
- Annesley Black: NO USE IN A CENTRE: Humans in Motion / aorko / tender pink descender / Smooche de la Rooche II / misinterpreting the 2008 south sudanese budget reform for the orchestra WERGO 2013 (WER 6590 2)
- Not thinking about the elephants on CD Quasar Quatuor de Saxophones – De Souffles et de Machines III. qb – CQB 2127. Canada, 2021 (Track 3)
- Portrait CD „Annesley Black – Things that didn’t work the first time“. Kairos – 0018006KAI, Ernst von Siemens Musikstiftung. CD. Austria, Jan. 2022
