= Dessoff =

Dessoff is a surname. Notable people with the surname include:

- Felix Otto Dessoff (1835–1892), German conductor and composer
- Margarete Dessoff (1874–1944), German choral conductor, singer, and voice teacher

== See also ==
- Dessoff Choirs, is an independent chorus based in New York City
