= Ottmar Gerster =

German viola player, composer and conductor (1897–1969)

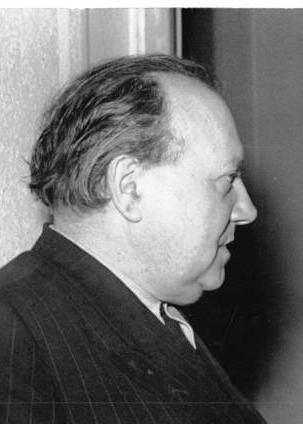
- Ottmar Gerster (1952)
- Born: 29 June 1897; Braunfels, Hesse, German Empire
- Died: 31 August 1969 (aged 72); Borsdorf (Leipzig), Saxony, GDR (East Germany)
- Occupations: Viola player Conductor; Composer
- Political party: SED

Ottmar Gerster (29 June 1897 – 31 August 1969) was a German viola player, conductor and composer who in 1948 became rector of the Liszt Music Academy in Weimar.

== Life ==
Ottmar Gerster was born some 50 km (30 miles) north of Frankfurt during the closing years of the nineteenth century. His father was a neurologist and his mother was a pianist. He attended an Academic secondary school ("Gymnasium") and entered, in 1913, the Dr Hoch Music Conservatory where his teachers included Bernhard Sekles (improvisation) and Adolf Rebner (violin). It was at the Hoch Conservatory that Gerster also got to know Paul Hindemith who was a near contemporary.

Between 1916 and 1918 his music education was interrupted when he was called up for military service, but he concluded his formal studies successfully in 1920. From 1921 he was working with the Frankfurt Symphony Orchestra, initially as the Concertmaster ("leader") and the between 1923 and 1927 as a solo viola player. During the 1920s Gerster also joined up with the labour movement and organised Workers' Choral Groups. In addition, from 1927 till 1947 he taught at the Folkwang University of the Arts in Essen, specialising in violin, viola, chamber music, music theory and composition.

In January 1933 the NSDAP (Nazi Party) took power and quickly set about creating a one-party state out of Germany. During the ensuing twelve years Gerster's relationship with the Hitler regime was often collaborative, but at other times problematic. He composed a "Consecration piece" for the regime in 1933 as well as a "battle hymn" for (Nazi) German Christian organisation entitled "You should burn", setting a text by Baldur von Schirach. In 1936 there was a popular song entitled "The stranger bride" and a choral song "German airmen". In 1939, briefly, he was required to undertake "army service" as a "Road construction soldier". In 1940 he composed a song for which he had himself written the words and which was entitled "Song of the Essen Road building corps".

Gerster's Opera "The Witches of Passau" had its first performance in Düsseldorf in 1941. Further productions quickly followed in Bremen, Magdeburg, Essen und Liegnitz, and in the same year the city of Düsseldorf awarded him its version of the Robert Schumann Prize for the work. In 1943 the National Office for Music Production (die Reichsstelle für Musikbearbeitung) gave him a 50,000 Mark contract to compose his opera "The Nutter" ("Rappelkopf") which was later renamed, less colloquially, "The enchanted self" ("Das verzauberte Ich"). During the closing period of the war Chancellor Hitler included him on the official schedule of "Divinely gifted artists", produced in August/September 1944. This listed more than 1,000 people from the arts establishment who on account of their cultural value should be kept away from involvement in fighting even, as the enemy armies advanced, on the home front. Around this time Gerster returned to Essen where he lived till 1947.

In May 1945 the war ended and Gerster found himself on the blacklist of the occupying American army. He nevertheless continued to lecture in Essen till 1947 which was the year in which he relocated from the British occupation zone to the Soviet occupation zone. The Soviet zone was by now in the process of being transformed into the German Democratic Republic (East Germany). In 1947 he joined the new country's newly formed Socialist Unity Party of Germany (SED / Sozialistische Einheitspartei Deutschlands). In 1947 he accepted a professorship in composition and music theory at the Franz Liszt Music Academy in Weimar, where between 1948 and 1951 he was the rector. In 1950 he was a founding member of the East German Cultural Academy. In 1951 he left Weimar and took a position at what was then called the Mendelssohn Music Academy in Leipzig, where he remained till his retirement in 1962.

Between 1951 and 1968 Gerster was chairman of the country's Association of Composers and Musicologists.

== Style ==
Gerster was a relatively traditional composer. He stuck to the framework of conventional extended tonality, often using church music modes, essentially building his chord structures on fourths and fifths. His works were mostly classical in their architecture: he made extensive use of Sonata form. Like many composers at this time he felt an affinity with folk songs, from which his music sometimes incorporates melodies. There is also a stress on a "hand-crafted" element in his tonality. Gerster was an early exponent of music for the masses and had no difficulty in accommodating his work to the guidelines of Socialist realism on which, at least during the early 1950s, the state insisted. There is frequently a certain amount of neo-classicism injected, but Gerster is also able to write with great pathos. Sometimes his style resembles that of his student contemporary, Paul Hindemith.

== Awards and honours ==
- 1926: Schott Music prize
- 1941: Robert Schumann Prize of the city of Düsseldorf
- 1951: National Prize of East Germany Class 2 for culture and literature
- 1962: Patriotic Order of Merit in Silver
- 1967: National Prize of East Germany Class 1 for culture and literature

== Compositions ==
- Orchestral works
  - Symphony No. 1 Kleine Sinfonie (1933/34)
  - Symphony No. 2 Thüringische Sinfonie (1949–52)
  - Symphony No. 3 Leipziger Sinfonie with choral finale (1964/65, 2nd version 1966)
  - Symphony No. 4 Weimarer Sinfonie (only the first movement completed, 1969; for the 20th anniversary of the GDR)
  - Oberhessische Bauerntänze (1938)
  - Festive Toccata (1941/42)
  - Festival Overture 1948 (1948)
  - Dresdener Suite (1956)
- Concertos
  - Piano concerto in A (1931, rev. 1955)
  - Violin concerto (1939)
  - Concertino for Viola and Chamber orchestra op. 16 (ca. 1928)
  - 'Cello concerto in D (before 1946)
  - Horn concerto (1958)
  - Capriccietto for four kettledrums and string orchestra (ca. 1932)
- Opera
  - Madame Liselotte, Opera (1932/33; first performance Oct. 21, 1933, Essen)
  - Enoch Arden oder Der Möwenschrei, Opera (1935/36; first performance Nov. 15, 1936, Düsseldorf; Text: Karl Michael Freiherr von Levetzow)
  - Die Hexe von Passau, Opera (1939–41; first performance Oct. 11, 1941, Düsseldorf)
  - Das verzauberte Ich, Opera (1943–48; first performance 1949, Wuppertal)
  - Der fröhliche Sünder, Opera (1960–62)
- Various vocal works
  - Das Lied vom Arbeitsmann (1928)
  - Der geheimnisvolle Trompeter, Cantata (1928)
  - Wir!, socialist festival piece (1931/32)
  - Ihr sollt brennen, Kampfchoral der Deutschen Christen (Text: Baldur von Schirach, 1933)
  - Gedenket ihrer, Cantata for soprano, speaking voice, male chorus and orchestra (1939, for Nazi Heroes Day)
  - Eisenkombinat Ost, Cantata (1951)
  - Sein rotes Banner, Song to Karl Marx (1954)
  - Ballade vom Manne Karl Marx und der Veränderung der Welt (Text: Walther Victor, 1958)
  - countless choral works
  - Songs
  - Folksong arrangements
- Chamber music
  - String quartet No. 1 in D (1920/21)
  - String quartet No. 2 in C (1954)
  - String trio op.42 (ca. 1922)
  - String sextet in c op.5 (1921/22)
  - Sonata for Violin and Piano (1950/51)
  - Sonata for Viola and Piano No. 1 in D (1919–22)
  - Sonata for Viola and Piano No. 2 in F (1954/55)
  - Higs quartet for 4 double basses (1932)
  - Sonatine for Oboe and Piano (1969)
  - Works for Accordion
- Piano music
  - Phantasie in G op.9 (1922)
  - Sonatine (1922/23)
  - other small pieces
