= Alexander Schneider =

Lithuanian-American musician (1908–1993)

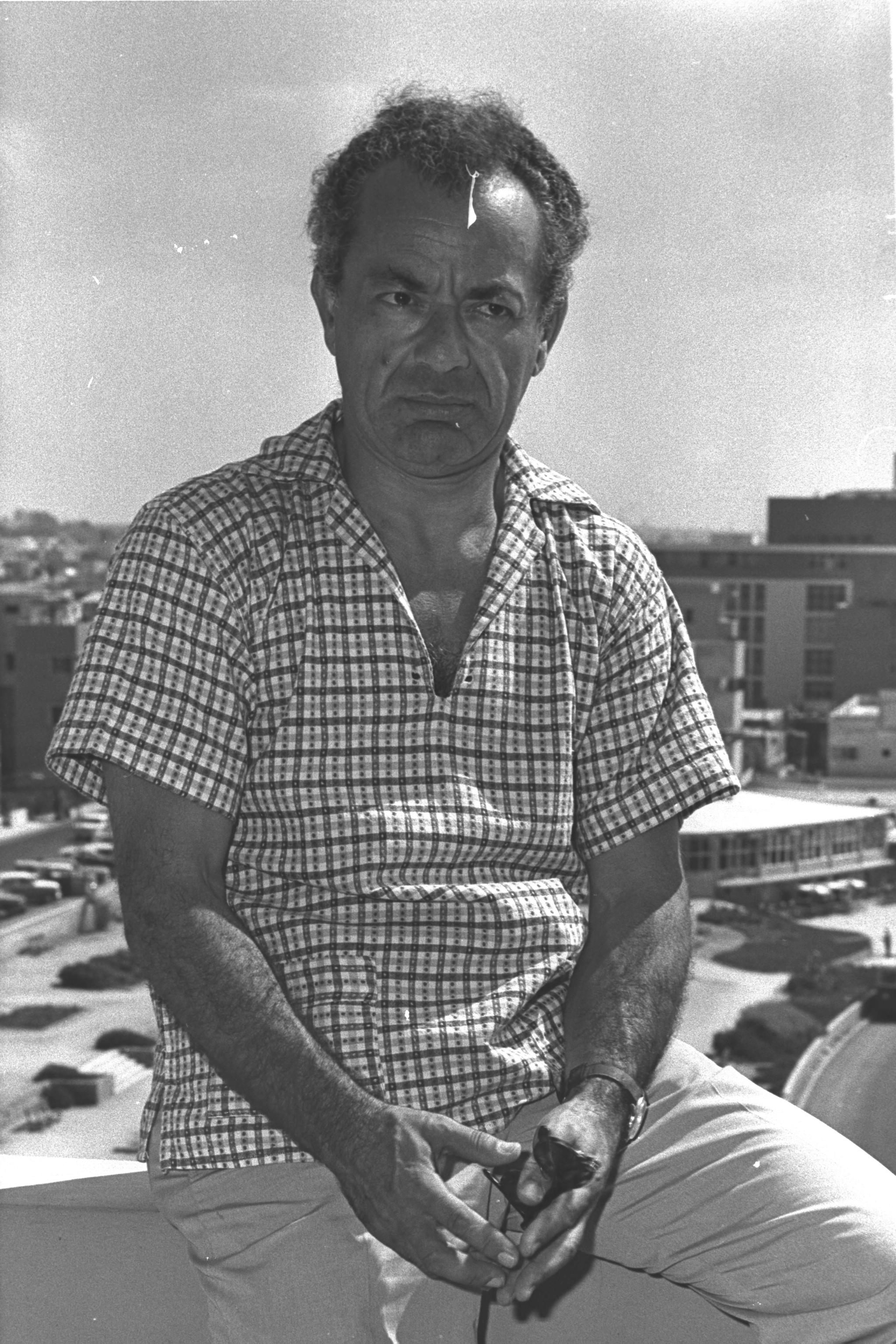
- Schneider in 1961
- Born: Abram Sznejder; October 21, 1908; Vilnius, Vilna Governorate, Russian Empire
- Died: February 2, 1993 (aged 84); New York City, US
- Occupations: violinist, conductor, educator
- Spouse: Geraldine Page (m. 1954; div. 1957)

Abraham Alexander Schneider (October 21, 1908 – February 2, 1993) was a violinist, conductor and educator. Born to a Jewish family in Vilnius, Lithuania, he later moved to the United States as a member of the Budapest String Quartet.

== Early life ==
Alexander (Sasha) was born Abram Sznejder. At 13, he almost died of tetanus after cutting his knee in an accident. The tetanus distorted his joints and recovery was long and painful. Sasha left Vilnius in 1924 and joined his brother Mischa Schneider in Frankfurt after securing a scholarship to study violin with Adolf Rebner, the principal violin tutor at the Hoch Conservatory.

== Career ==
In 1927, Alexander became leader (concertmaster) of an orchestra in Saarbrücken. It was at this point that he changed his name. The conductor wanted him as leader, but wanted a German-sounding name. Abram took Schneider as a surname because his brother Mischa had already chosen it, and Alexander appealed to him as a first name. In 1929, he was appointed leader of the Norddeutscher Rundfunk Orchestra in Hamburg. In 1932, he lost this job as a result of the ongoing Nazi campaign against Jews, and soon had to leave Germany.

=== Budapest String Quartet ===
At this time, the Budapest String Quartet, whose cellist was Sasha's brother Mischa, lost their first violinist. Although the quartet had not yet left Germany, they spent a lot of time out of the country, were self-employed, and the Nazis had not yet caught up with them. For Sasha to join them was an ideal arrangement all round. Their existing second violinist, Josef Roismann, switched to first and Sasha joined as second. This was because Roismann was already comfortable with the other players whereas Sasha would need time to learn their repertoire and style.

In 1934, the Nazis made threats to the quartet and they left Berlin for Paris the next day, never to return to Germany again – even on tour. When war broke out in 1939, they happened to be on tour in the United States. They all obtained permission to stay and from then on made it their base.

=== Independence ===
External audio
- You may hear Alexander Schneider, Pablo Casals, Rudolf Serkin, Peter Serkin and the Marlboro Festival Orchestra performing: Johann Sebastian Bach's Brandenburg Concertos No 1-6 in 1965; Here on Archive.org

Later on, Schneider felt the need to develop himself as an independent musician, so he left the quartet in 1944, full of energy and ideas. He was offered a conductorship of the Metropolitan Opera, and leadership of the Pro Arte and Paganini Quartets but turned them down. He toured with Ralph Kirkpatrick and he formed the Albeneri Trio with Benar Heifetz and Erich Itor Kahn.

In 1949, Schneider formed the Schneider Quartet to perform and record all eighty-three Haydn quartets. This was not completed because its sponsor, the Haydn Society, ran out of funds. The same year he recorded Bach's complete Sonatas and Partitas for Unaccompanied Violin (BWV 1001-1006) for Mercury Records.

In Prades, Schneider studied with Pablo Casals and persuaded him to participate in the 1950 Prades Festival to honor the 200th anniversary of Bach's death. He supported Casals in further Bach festivals at Prades and Perpignan. Later he would conduct Casals' oratorio The Manger (El Pessebre) in Guadalajara, Jalisco, Mexico, during the Festival Casals de México, recording it in 1973 in Puerto Rico.

Schneider was a sociable man with a wide circle of friends. He worked hard to promote chamber music with free or subsidized concerts.

=== Return to the Budapest String Quartet ===
In 1956, the Budapest String Quartet persuaded Schneider to rejoin them. They had tried two other second violinists (Ortenberg and Gorodetzky), neither of them able to reach Schneider's high standards, and Roismann had refused to continue with anyone else. Schneider had remained in close contact with the quartet and he stood in for Ortenberg or Gorodetzky when they were ill. Now it was agreed the quartet would operate part-time with Schneider and he would continue his independent career. They finally disbanded in 1967.

=== New School, Brandenburg and Washington Square ===
External audio
- You may hear Alexander Schneider conducting the Columbia Symphony Orchestra and Rudolf Serkin in Wolfgang Amadeus Mozart's: Piano Concerto No.21 in C major, k. 467; Piano Concerto No. 27 in B flat major, K. 595 in 1957; Here on archive.org

Schneider was the artistic director of the Schneider Concerts at the New School in New York City, from 1957 until his death. Under the auspices of the New School, Schneider and his manager, Frank Salomon, founded the New York String Orchestra Seminar, a year-end performance seminar for young string musicians in 1969. The musicians, in their teens and early 20s, are selected by audition, and those accepted pay no fee to take part in a intensive 10-day regimen of rehearsals, coaching sessions, workshops, and performances which culminates in an annual Christmas Eve concert at Carnegie Hall.

During the time Schneider also joined forces as the conductor of the Columbia Symphony Orchestra with the legendary Rudolf Serkin to record Wolfgang Amadeus Mozart's Piano Concerto No. 21 in C Major, K. 467 and Mozart's Piano Concerto No. 27 in B flat major, K. 595 for Columbia Masterworks (ML 5013, 1957).

Schneider played with a number of other chamber groups, among them his own string group, and the Brandenburg Ensemble. In 1975, he accompanied pianist Arthur Rubinstein in Beethoven's Emperor Concerto with the Jerusalem Symphony Orchestra in Israel.

Schneider founded the Washington Square Music Festival in 1953, a free alfresco concert series specializing in chamber music for the enjoyment and education of his Greenwich Village neighbors. Now an international festival, it continues with his mission.

== Recognition ==
Schneider received the Kennedy Center Honors in 1988.

== Death ==
Schneider died of heart failure in Manhattan, New York City, at the age of 84.
