= Paul Hirsch (bibliophile) =

German industrialist, musicologist and bibliophile

Paul Adolf Hirsch (24 February 1881, Frankfurt am Main – 25 November 1951, Cambridge, England) was a German industrialist. He was also a musician, bibliophile and musicologist who assembled the largest private music library in Europe. The Hirsch Collection is now housed at the British Library.

== Biography ==
Paul Hirsch was born into a wealthy Jewish mercantile family, the fourth of five children of Anna Pauline (née Mayer) and Ferdinand Hirsch (1834–1916). He had two brothers—Robert von Hirsch (1883–1977), (Note: The "von" was granted by Ernest Louis, Grand Duke of Hesse in 1913. In 1933 Robert left Germany, taking his family, business, and art collection to Basel, Switzerland.) a noted art collector, and Carl Siegmund Hirsch, a district court judge who died in 1938 in the Buchenwald concentration camp. Ferdinand Hirsch founded Hirsch and Company, an iron works, in 1867. After completing school, Paul Hirsch entered the family business, training in England and France, which also broadened his acquaintance with musicians and collectors.

In 1911 he married Olga Ladenburg (1889–1969), daughter of a Frankfurt banker. (Note: Olga Ladenburg was also a bibliophile and a collector of decorated papers used in bookbinding.) They lived first in Beethovenstraße and later at Neue Mainzer Straße 57 (destroyed in 1944). They had two sons and two daughters.

From 1930 to 1933 Hirsch was vice president of the Frankfurt Chamber of Industry and Commerce. He was also served on the advisory board for export trade, the foreign trade committee of the German Industry and Commerce Association, and chaired the foreign trade office.

Hirsch belonged to the Weimar Society of Bibliophiles and co-founded the Frankfurt Bibliophile Society (Frankfurter Bibliophilen-Gesellschaft) in 1922, serving as chairman.

He was a member of the German People's Party.

Hirsch died on 23 November 1951 in Cambridge.

== Building the collection ==
Hirsch, an accomplished violinist who had studied with Adolf Rebner, took a keen interest in publications concerning all aspects of music—performance, history and theory. In 1896 he began to collect historical musical works, focusing on early printed editions of Haydn, Mozart and Beethoven, 19th-century opera and early theoretical works. He participated in the Second Specialist Music Exhibition at the Leipzig Crystal Palace in 1909. In 1922 Hirsch hired musicologist Kathi Meyer (later Meyer-Baer) as a research assistant and opened the library to the public two days a week. Hirsch and Meyer began compiling a catalog of the library contents.

In 1928 and 1929 Hirsch purchased the library of Berlin music critic Werner Wolffheim at auction. With this addition of approximately 15,000 items to the 5,000 he already possessed, he now owned the largest and best-kept private music library in Europe. Housed in a wing of the house on Neue Mainzer Straße, the library had its own concert hall. Hirsch organized over four hundred chamber music evenings, during which he often played first violin in his "house quartet", which on occasion would include his friend Ludwig Rottenberg and Rottenberg's son-in-law Paul Hindemith.

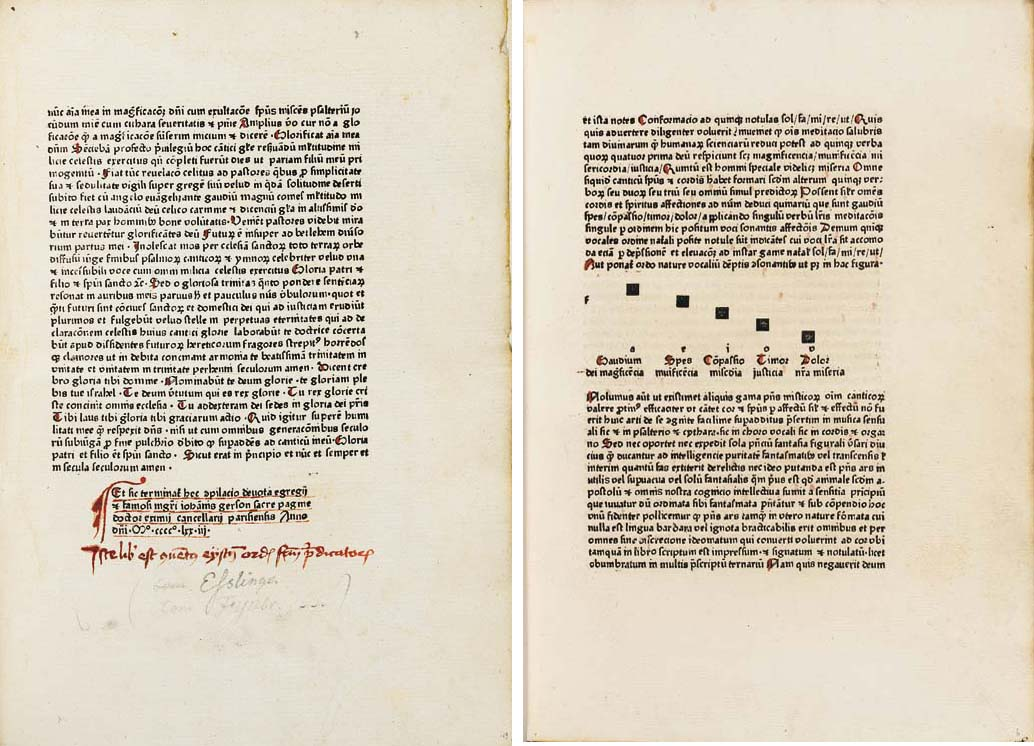
Jean Gerson, Collectorium super magnificat, 1473

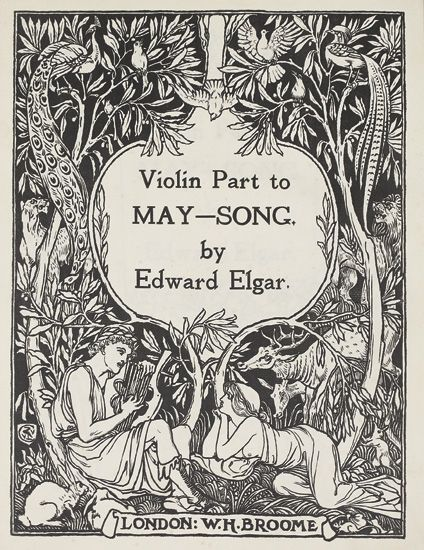
May-Song by Edward Elgar, illustrated by Walter Crane, 1901

The library was a valuable resource for musicians, musicologists and students. The visitor register for the years 1923 to 1935 lists many people well known in Frankfurt's musical circles, including Licco Amar, Theodor Wiesengrund Adorno, conductor and music critic Artur Holde, Erich Itor Kahn, pianist Emma Lübbecke-Job, singer Carl Rehfuss, Ludwig Rottenberg, Hermann Scherchen, Mátyás Seiber and Helmut Walcha. The list also records visitors who came from as far away as Tokyo. Other friends in Hirsch's musical circle included Wilhelm Furtwängler, Bruno Walter and Stefan Zweig.

Hirsch's collection encompasses four and a half centuries of Western music. A few of the items that he was most proud of, according to librarian and musicologist Alec Hyatt King, were:

- Jean Gerson's Collectorium super magnificat, printed in Esslingen am Neckar, Germany, by Conrad Fyner in 1473, which contains the first musical notes ever printed. (Note: Alec Hyatt King writes that it "is little more than a curiosity, devoid of significance as music, to which it stands in the same relationship as would the first five letters of the alphabet, if so printed, to the words of a sentence.")
- The only known copy of Francesco Caza's Tractato vulgare de canto figurato (Milan, 1492) (Note: Hirsch published this work in facsimile in 1922 as the first in a series of reprints of items in his collection.)
- The Glückwünschende Kirchen Motetto, also known as Gott ist mein König, Johann Sebastian Bach's earliest published work, printed in nineteen parts at Mühlhausen in 1708. One of only three known copies.
- Bach's own copy of Clavier-Übung I with corrections in his hand.
- One of two known copies of the first edition of La Marseillaise, printed in 1792.
- Edward Elgar's May-Song, with decorations by Walter Crane, one of five or ten copies on vellum, 1901.

Opera is particularly well represented, as noted by King:

The range of operas in score in Hirsch's library was remarkable, and exemplified both his bibliographical and his musical taste. It began with Peri's Euridice (Florence, 1600), and proceeded right up to his own times. He had some forty operas by Lulli, all Mozart's in the first editions issued in full score in all important countries, and some Rossini rarities, Il barbiere di Siviglia, Il Guglielmo Tell, L'Inganno felice, Matilde Shabran, Maometto secondo, Mosè in Egitto, Ricciardo e Zoraide, Semiramide, all printed in handsome oblong folio by lithography by Ratti & Cencetti in Rome, between c. 1816 and 1825. (Note: According to the New Grove: "They are landmarks in both Italian and in lithographic music publishing; only a few operatic full scores were published in Italy in the 19th century, and it was at this time exceptional for such large-scale works to be printed by lithography anywhere.") Equally impressive were the sumptuously bound folio scores of nine operas and ballets by Richard Strauss, Ariadne auf Naxos (in both versions), Der Bürger als Edelmann, Elektra, Feuersnot, Die Frau ohne Schatten, Guntram, Josephs Legende, Der Rosenkavalier, and Salome. These and five dramatic works by [Franz] Schreker were normally available for hire only. The same restriction had originally applied to the full score of the younger Johann Strauss's Die Fledermaus, one of Hirsch's most cherished operas, and to another rarity, Glinka's Ruslan and Ludmilla.

Between 1922 and 1934 Hirsch issued facsimile editions of some library items, edited by Johannes Wolf and published by Martin Breslauer. The German National Library has cataloged eleven of these facsimiles and reprints.

== Emigration ==
When the National Socialists seized power in 1933, Hirsch's situation became difficult because of his Jewish heritage. The Bibliophile Societies came under the control of the Reich Chamber of Culture, where Jews could no longer hold board positions. In 1934 Hirsch resigned as chair of the Frankfurt Society and joined the Kulturbundes Deutscher Juden.

Early in 1936, Hirsch wrote to his friend Edward J. Dent, Professor of Music at the University of Cambridge, proposing a contractual loan of the music library to the university. Dent helped arrange the loan and facilitated the emigration of Hirsch's family to Cambridge later that year. Despite efforts by Frankfurt mayor Friedrich Krebs to prevent export or to confiscate the music library, Hirsch was able to transfer almost all of it to Cambridge in several train cars.

Hirsch's collection was placed in the newly built Cambridge University Library where it took up almost 1,000 feet (300 m) of shelving on the fifth floor. Despite his expatriation from Germany in 1938, Hirsch was briefly interned as an enemy alien in 1940, which worsened his already fragile health. This, in combination with his strained finances, led to his decision to sell the music library. In 1946, with assistance from Dent, he sold it to the British Museum for £120,000 (equivalent to £6,287,000 in 2023) although he continued to purchase additional items which he donated to the museum. In 1973, the British Library Act 1972 created the British Library, which took ownership of the British Museum library.

== Selected bibliography ==
Hirsch wrote a number of papers about items in his library. A 75-page catalog of works by W. A. Mozart was published in 1906 in honor of the composer's 150th birthday. In 1928 he published the first volume of the Katalog der Musikbibliothek Paul Hirsch. He also published several articles about the iron business.

=== In German ===
- Hirsch, Paul (1906). "Ein unbekanntes Lied von W. A. Mozart". Die Musik (in German). 5: 164.
- —— (1921). "Die Lage des deutschen Eisenmarktes". Mitteilungen der Vereinigten Handelskammern Frankfurt a. M.-Hanau.
- —— (1927). "Musik-Bibliophilie. Aus den Erfahrungen einens Musik-Sammlers.". Von Büchern und Menschen. Festschrift für Fedor von Zobeltitz zum 5. Oktober 1927. Weimar: Gesellschaft der Bibliophilen. pp. 247–254.
- —— (1929). "Bibliographie der Musiktheoretischen Drucke des Fanchino Gafori.". Festschrift für Johann Wolf zu seinem 60. Geburtstag. Berlin: Breslauer. pp. 65–72.
- —— (1930). Die Lages des Großhandels im Jahre 1930, unter besonderer Berücksichtigung des Frankfurter Bezirks. Jahresbericht der Industrie- und Handelskammer Frankfurt a. M. (Report).
- —— (1932). "Die Frankfurter Bibliophilen-Gesellschaft". Zeitschrift für Bücherfreunde. 36: 2–4.
- —— (1934). "Beiträge zur Musik-Bibliophilie". Festschrift Carl Ernst Poeschel zum 60. Geburtstag am 2. September 1934. Leipzig: Poeschel & Trepte. pp. 58–66.
- ——; Meyer-Baer, Kathi (eds.). Katalog der Musikbibliothek Paul Hirsch. The first three volumes were originally published by Martin Breslauer, Berlin, and were reprinted by Morsum/Sylt:Cicero Presse of Hamburg in 1993. The fourth volume, which includes addenda to the first three, was completed in Cambridge with the help of Edith Schnapper and Hirsch's daughters, Irene Hartogs-Hirsch and Renate Schuster.
  - Vol. 1: Theoretische Drucke bis 1800. (1928)
  - Vol. 2: Opern-Partituren. (1930)
  - Vol. 3: Instrumental- und Vokalmusik bis etwa 1830. (1936)
  - Vol. 4: Erstausgaben, Chorwerke in Partitur, Gesamtausgaben, Nachschlagewerke etc. Ergänzungen zu Bd. 1–3. Cambridge University Press (1947)

=== In English ===
- Hirsch, Paul (July 1938). "A Discrepancy in Beethoven (concerning the C minor Symphony)". Music & Letters. XIX: 265–267. doi:10.1093/ml/XIX.3.265.
- —— (1940). "Some Early Mozart Editions". The Music Review. 1: 54–67.
- —— (1942). "More Early Mozart Editions". The Music Review. 3: 38–45.
- —— (1942). "Mozart's Great Mass in C Minor (K. 427)". The Cambridge Review. 63 (1552): 344.
- —— (1944). "A Mozart problem (concerning Piano Fantasy K. 397)". Music & Letters. 25: 209–212. doi:10.1093/ml/XXV.4.209.
- —— (1946). "The Salzburg Mozart Festival, 1906. Reminiscences of an amateur". The Music Review. 7: 149–153.
- —— (1947). "Dr. Arnold's Handel-Edition (1787–1797)". The Music Review. 8: 106–116.

== Sources ==
- Hansert, Andreas (2016). "Hirsch, Robert (von)". Frankfurter Personenlexikon (in German).
- Hock, Sabine (1994). "Hirsch, Paul". Frankfurter Personenlexikon (in German).
- King, Alec Hyatt (1981). "Paul Hirsch and his Music Library". The British Library Journal. 7 (1): 1–11. JSTOR 42554128.
