= Hans Jelmoli =

Swiss musician (1877–1936)

Hans Jelmoli (January 17, 1877 – May 6, 1936) was a Swiss composer and pianist.

== Life ==
Hans Jelmoli was born in Zürich, Switzerland on January 17, 1877. He came from a wealthy Swiss family who founded a well known retailing business by the same name. He studied music with Bernhard Scholz, Iwan Knorr, and Engelbert Humperdinck at the Hoch Conservatory in Frankfurt. He first studied piano with Ernst Engesser. From 1898 to 1899 he was the third director of the Staatstheater Mainz, and from 1899 to 1900 as the second director at the state theater in Würzburg. Upon returning to Zürich in 1900, he was active as a pianist, composer, and music critic (from 1906 to 1911 for the Zurich Post). He married Martha Henggeler in 1907. He became a member of the selection commission of the Musical Academy of Zurich in 1920.

As a piano soloist, song recital accompanist, and chamber music player, he found much success in Switzerland and abroad. Thanks to his extensive knowledge of languages, he was able to translate opera libretti for his composer colleagues.

Hans Jelmoli died in Zürich on May 6, 1936.

== Works ==
His compositional output included stage and theatrical music (for Shakespeare's Comedy of Errors and Büchner's Leonce und Lena) and several operas (Sein Vermächtnis and Prinz Goldhaar und die Gänsehirtin). He also wrote works for piano, chamber music, songs, and song cycles for both piano and orchestral accompaniment. His choral works used to be very popular and real text and musical material inspired by the folk traditions of his homeland.
