= Biersack =

Biersack may refer to:

In music:

- Biersack, the first incarnation of American rock band Black Veil Brides
  - Andy Biersack, lead vocalist of Black Veil Brides
- Anton Biersack, German composer and music educator
