= Walther Davisson =

German violinist and conductor

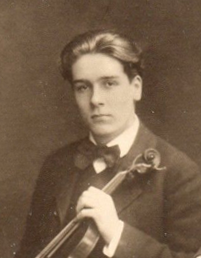
Walther Davisson (ca. 1910)

Walther Davisson (15 December 1885 – 18 July 1973) was a German violinist and conductor.

== Background ==
Davisson was born in Frankfurt am Main. He studied in Frankfurt at the Hoch Conservatory from 1900 to 1906 with Johann Naret-Koning and Adolf Rebner, in whose string quartet he played second violin from 1906 to 1913. He also taught violin in Frankfurt until 1918.

After several years as conductor of the orchestra and deputy to Director Max Pauer at the Leipzig Conservatory, Davisson himself became director of that institution in 1932. From 1950 to 1954, he served as artistic director of the combined Musikhochschule and Hoch Conservatory in Frankfurt.

== Additional Work ==
Davisson was also active as an editor. Among works published in his editions were the first book of Jacques Féréol Mazas's Études Brillantes and violin concerti by Ludwig Spohr and Pierre Rode.

As a conductor, Davisson made recordings in the 1950s for the American label Vox, including several performances of concerti with pianist Friedrich Wührer.

He died on 18 July 1973 in Bad Homburg.

== Sources ==
- Doctoral Treatise, Hart, Heather Ann Wolters, An Exploration of Underplayed Violin Concertos Appropriate for Intermediate and Advanced Students, Florida State University College of Music
- Cassandra Artists Hessenberg, Kurt, A Brief Autobiography
- The Music Sack, entry for Walther Davisson accessed March 5, 2008
- Partitura Sheetmusic - Songbooks
- Peter Cahn: Das Hoch'sche Konservatorium in Frankfurt am Main (1878–1978), Frankfurt am Main: Kramer, 1979.
