= Paul Hirsch =

Paul Hirsch may refer to:

- Paul Hirsch (politician) (1868–1940), German politician
- Paul Hirsch (film editor) (born 1945), American film editor
- Paul Hirsch (bibliophile) (1881–1951), German industrialis, musician, bibliophile and musicologist
