= Erich Schmid (conductor) =

Swiss composer and conductor

Erich Schmid was a Swiss composer and conductor. He was born on 1 January 1907 in Balsthal, Switzerland and died on 17 December 2000 in Zürich. He studied composition with Bernhard Sekles at the Hoch Conservatory in Frankfurt and later with Arnold Schoenberg. Among many other international conducting roles, he was chief conductor of the Tonhalle Orchestra, Zürich from 1949 to 1957.

== Literature ==
- Peter Cahn: Das Hoch'sche Konservatorium in Frankfurt am Main (1878-1978), Frankfurt am Main: Kramer, 1979. (Seite 268ff)
- Chris Walton: "... in my duty to defend the truth", Erich Schmid in Schoenberg's Berlin Composition Class; in: Tempo, a quarterly review of Modern Music No. 218, Oktober 2001, p. 15-19, ill.
- Chris Walton: Schoenberg's Alpine wanderer: Erich Schmid at 100; in: The Musical Times, no. 1897, Winter 2006, p. 5-22, ill.
