= Max Rudolf (conductor) =

German conductor

Max Rudolf (June 15, 1902 — February 28, 1995) was a German conductor and music institute teacher.

Rudolf was born in Frankfurt am Main, where he studied cello, piano, organ and trumpet. He was a composition student of Bernhard Sekles at the Hoch Conservatory in Frankfurt. He held positions in Freiburg as assistant conductor at the Städtisches Theater, and as second conductor at the Hessisches Staatstheater in Darmstadt. In 1929, he became principal conductor of the German Theatre in Prague.

In 1940, Rudolf emigrated to the United States, and took American citizenship in 1945. In 1942, he conducted the Naumburg Orchestral Concerts, in the Naumburg Bandshell, Central Park, in the summer series. He served on the conducting staff of the Metropolitan Opera between 1946 and 1958 and had the title of musical administrator of the company between 1950 and 1958. In 1958, Rudolf became music director of the Cincinnati Symphony Orchestra, and held this post until 1970. He was director of the Cincinnati May Festival from 1963 to 1970. After his tenure in Cincinnati, Rudolf served as conductor of the Dallas Symphony for a season (1973–1974), and artistic advisor of the New Jersey Symphony for the 1976–1977 season.

Rudolf wrote The Grammar of Conducting, a widely used text for orchestral conducting which was published in 1950. It was republished with revisions in 1980 and again in 1995. He was head of the opera and conducting department at the Curtis Institute of Music from 1970 to 1973 and returned to the Curtis faculty under emeritus status in 1983, remaining so affiliated until his death.

Rudolf and his wife Liese had two children. His widow, their son William, and their daughter Marianne survived him, as well as five grandchildren and ten great-grandchildren.
