= Marie Hanfstängl =

German opera singer

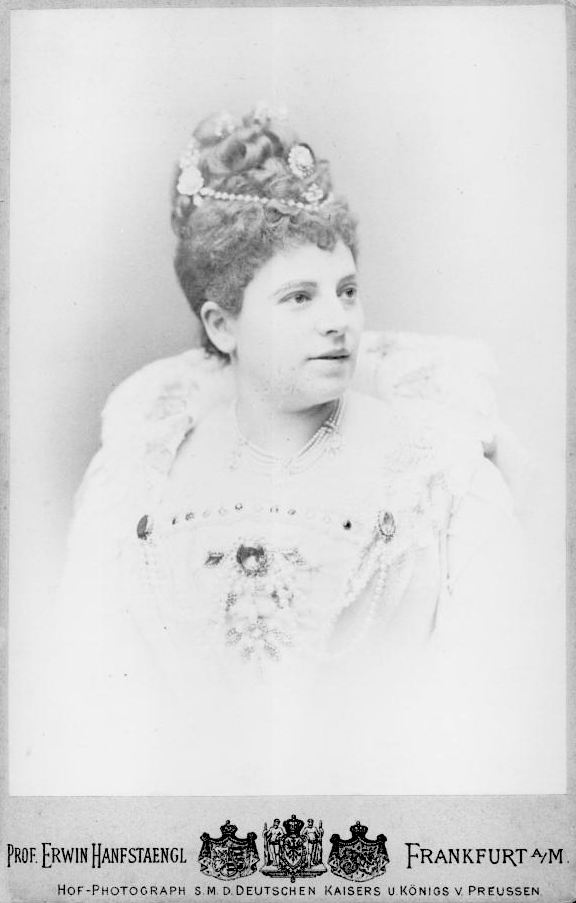
- Hanfstängl pictured by her husband in 1890
- Born: Marie Schroeder; 30 April 1848; Breslau, Silesia, Kingdom of Prussia
- Died: 5 September 1917 (aged 69); Munich, Bavaria, German Empire
- Other name: Marie Schröder-Hanfstängl
- Occupations: Soprano; singing teacher
- Years active: 1860s–1897
- Employer: Hoch Conservatory
- Style: Opera
- Spouse: Erwin Hanfstaengl

Marie Hanfstängl (30 April 1848 – 5 September 1917), born Marie Schroeder (or Schröder), was a German operatic soprano singer and singing teacher, whose career was mostly conducted in Germany.

Marie Schröder was born in Breslau. She became a pupil of Pauline Viardot's in Baden-Baden. She appeared at the Théâtre Lyrique in Paris in 1866, but returned to Germany on the outbreak of war in 1870. In 1871 she was engaged by the Court Opera House at Stuttgart.

After marrying Erwin Hanfstaengl, a member of the distinguished Stuttgart photographer and art-publishing family headed by Franz Hanfstaengl, Marie resumed her musical studies in 1878, going to Vannucini in Florence, and thereafter was employed by the Stadt-Theater at Frankfurt. She sang at the Metropolitan Opera as Marie Schröder-Hanfstängl during the 1884–85 and 1888–89 seasons. In 1895, she became a teacher of singing at the Hoch Conservatory in the same city, where one of her students was Margarete Dessoff. She retired in 1897, and spent her final years in Munich, where she died.

The trained voice, and capacity of her delivery made her a coloratura singer. Among her roles were Rosina (The Barber of Seville), Gretchen (in Gounod's Faust), Amina (La sonnambula), Philine (Mignon), Lucia, Martha.

== Writings ==
- Meine Lehrweise der Gesangskunst und Elementartheorie in Wort und Bild (My System of Teaching Singing). London, etc.: Schott & Co, 1902.

== Sources ==
=== General references ===
- Meyers, Konversations-Lexikon (1888–1890).
- A. Eaglefield-Hull, A Dictionary of Modern Music and Musicians (Dent, London 1924).
- Peter Cahn: Das Hoch'sche Konservatorium in Frankfurt am Main (1878–1978), Frankfurt am Main: Kramer, 1979.
