= Walter Rehberg =

Swiss concert pianist, composer and writer (1900–1957)

Walter Rehberg (14 May 1900 in Geneva – 24 October 1957) was a Swiss concert pianist, composer and writer on musical subjects who was particularly active from the 1920s to 1950s.

Walter Rehberg came from a line of notable pianists. His grandfather was Friedrich Rehberg, a distinguished pianist, and his father Willy Rehberg (1863–1937). Walter studied under his father at Hoch Conservatory, Frankfurt, and at the University School of Music at Mannheim. He later received tuition from Eugen d'Albert. By 1924 he had composed piano sonatas, a violin sonata and other piano pieces. During the 1920s and 1930s he made recordings for Polydor/Brunswick records and in the 1940s he recorded for Decca.

== Recordings (by 1936), Polydor numbers ==
- Liszt, Rhapsodie Espagnole, PD-95044-5
- Liszt, Sonetta del Petrarca 104, PD-95045
- Liszt, Ave Maria (Grove's no 33), PD-95043
- Liszt, Eglogue, Années de Pélerinage 1st yr no 7, PD-25138
- Liszt-Schubert, Valse-Caprice, Soirées de Vienne Set 1 no 6, PD-24993
- Liszt, Consolation no 3, PD-95042
- Mendelssohn, Spring song, PD-27229
- Chopin, Polonaise-Fantaisie op 61, PD-25137-8
- Brahms, Rhapsody B minor op 79 no 1, PD-90015
- Brahms, Rhapsody G minor op 79 no 3, PD-90016
- Brahms, Waltzes (selection), op 39, PD-25192
- Strauss, Voices Of Spring, Concert paraphrase on the B Major waltz, PD-23737
- Schubert, Piano Sonata no 11 G major (op 78) 3rd movt, PD-95049
- Schubert, 'Wanderer' Fantasia, C major op 15, PD-95047-9
- Schubert, Impromptu no 3 G major op 90 no 3, PD-95072
- Schubert, Moment musical op 94 no 3, PD-95072
- Schumann, Fantasie in C, Op. 17, PD-95039-42
- Grieg, Wedding Day at Troldhaugen, PD-24989
- Grieg, To Spring PD-27229
- Sinding, Rustle of Spring, PD-24989
- Rachmaninoff, Prelude in C sharp minor, PD-27229

== Writings ==
- G.F. Händel: Auswahl aus seinen Klavierwerken. Instruktive Ausgabe (Cotta, Stuttgart 1930).

Soon after the second war he published four biographical and musical studies, co-authored with Paula Rehberg.

- Franz Schubert, sein Leben und Werk (Artemis-Verlag, Zurich 1946)
- Johannes Brahms, sein Leben und Werk (Artemis-Verlag, Zurich 1947)
- Frédéric Chopin, sein Leben und sein Werk (Artemis-Verlag, Zurich 1949)
- Robert Schumann, sein Leben und sein Werk (Artemis-Verlag, Zurich & Stuttgart 1954)

== Sources ==
- R.D. Darrell, Gramophone Shop Encyclopedia of Recorded Music (New York 1936)
- A. Eaglefield-Hull, Dictionary of Modern Music and Musicians (Dent, London 1924)
- W. & P. Rehberg, works.
