= Joseph Hoch =

German lawyer and benefactor (1815-1874)

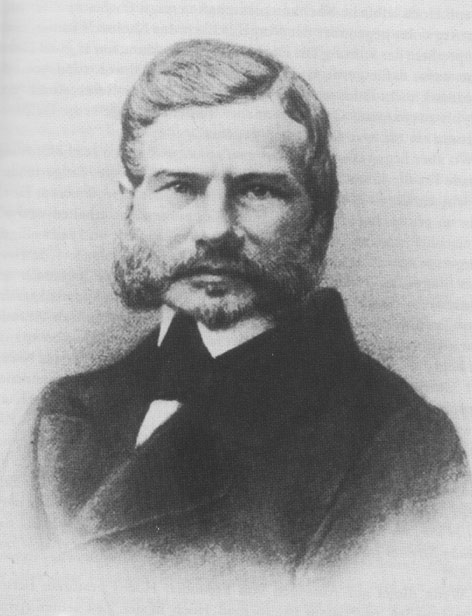
Dr. Joseph Hoch

Joseph Paul Johannes Hoch (3 May 1815 – 19 September 1874) was a German lawyer and benefactor. He willed his fortune to the Hoch Conservatory Foundation, founded in 1878 in Frankfurt. It is, after Leipzig and Berlin, the seventh oldest music conservatory in Germany. He was born and died in Frankfurt am Main.

== Life ==
Hoch came from a family which had been in Frankfurt am Main for generations. All four of his grandparents had lived there. His father, the lawyer Johann Peter Hieronymus Hoch (1779–1831), was a magistrate and senator who, in 1829, became mayor of the Free City of Frankfurt. His mother, the Swiss-born Ottilie von Sodenstern, was also the child of a magistrate and senator.

He began to learn piano and violin at a young age. Like his father before him, Hoch studied law and received the degree of Doctor of Law. At the age of 41 he married the Baroness Ottilie von Sodenstern, who would outlive him by 48 years. She died in Kassel in 1922. The couple had no offspring.

He inherited a large fortune from both sides of his family. He decided early on, with banker Johann Friedrich Städel as his model, to bequeath enough money to his city to found an institute for education in the arts. Before he made a trip to in England in 1843, he made a first version of a will with this intention, which was completed on 14 July 1857. In his testament of 21 paragraphs, he left the Conservatory Foundation approximately one million German gold marks.

His grave can be found at the main city graveyard in Frankfurt.
