= Hoch Conservatory =

Music school in Frankfurt, Germany

Dr. Hoch's Konservatorium Musikakademie
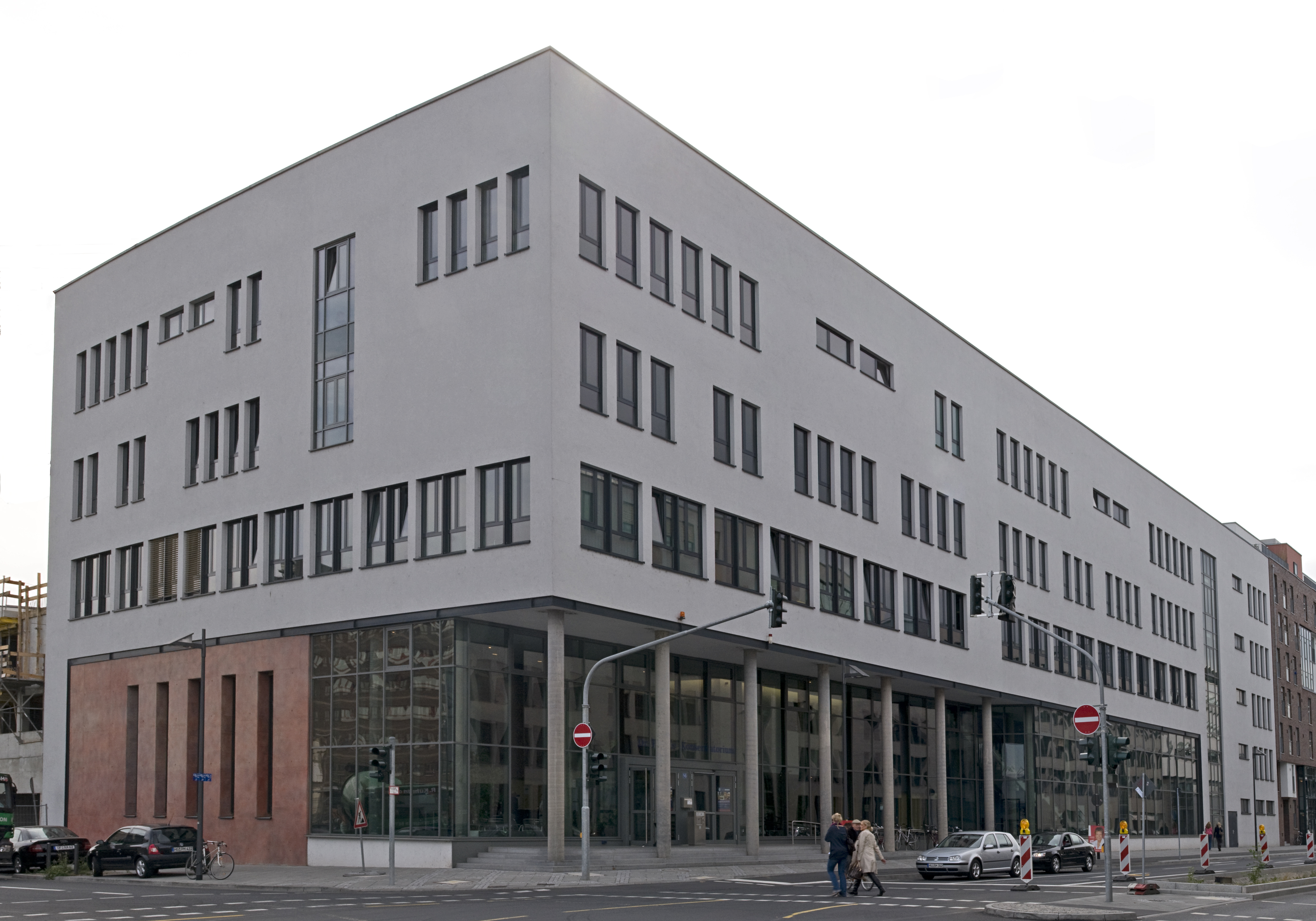
- The Conservatory in Frankfurt-Ostend in 2009
- Type: Public
- Established: 1878
- Location: Sonnenmannstraße 16, Frankfurt, Hesse, Germany; 50°06′36″N 8°41′59″E
- Website: www.dr-hochs.de

Dr. Hoch's Konservatorium – Musikakademie is a musical conservatory and art school located in Frankfurt, Germany. It was founded on 22 September 1878, and funded by the estate of Joseph Hoch, who willed one million German gold marks upon his death to establish the Konservatorium-Musikakademie. Instrumental to the creation, prosperity and success of the conservatory was its establishing director, Joachim Raff, who created and administered the institution, set the entire curriculum, and hired all of its faculty. It has played an important role in the history of music in Frankfurt. Clara Schumann taught piano, as one of the distinguished teachers in the late 19th century, contributing to international renown for the conservatory. In the 1890s, about 25% of the conservatory's students were from other countries, with around 46 students from England and 23 students from the United States.

In the 1920s, under director Bernhard Sekles, the conservatory was far ahead of its time: Sekles initiated the world's first Jazz Studies (directed by Mátyás Seiber), and in 1931 Sekles established the conservatory's Elementary Music Department.

Dr. Hoch's Conservatory offers instruction in the Music Education for Youth and Adults (ANE) program, the Elementary Music Department (Basisabteilung), and the Pre-College-Frankfurt (PCF) program (a program which provides younger students preparation for future studies at a Hochschule or conservatory). There are also Ballet, Early Music and New Music departments.

The following degree qualifications are available for study at the conservatory: Bachelor of Music in Performance and Pedagogy in all instruments, voice, music theory, composition, performance and Elementary Music Pedagogy.

== Chronology ==
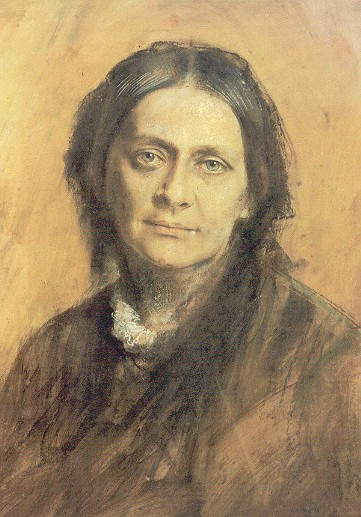
Clara Schumann, in 1878; taught at the conservatory, 1878–1892

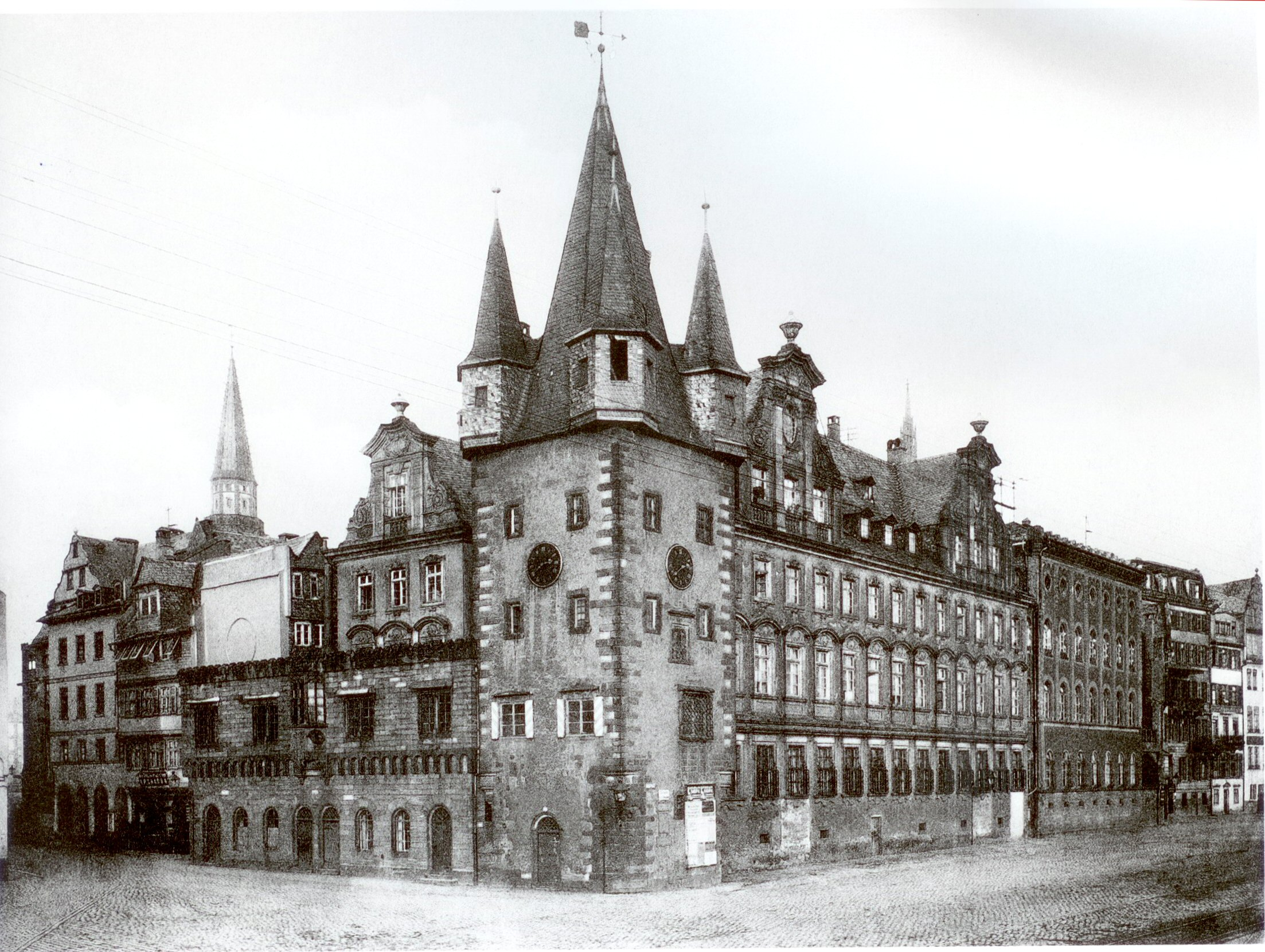
Saalhof ca. 1900: Home of the conservatory, 1878–88

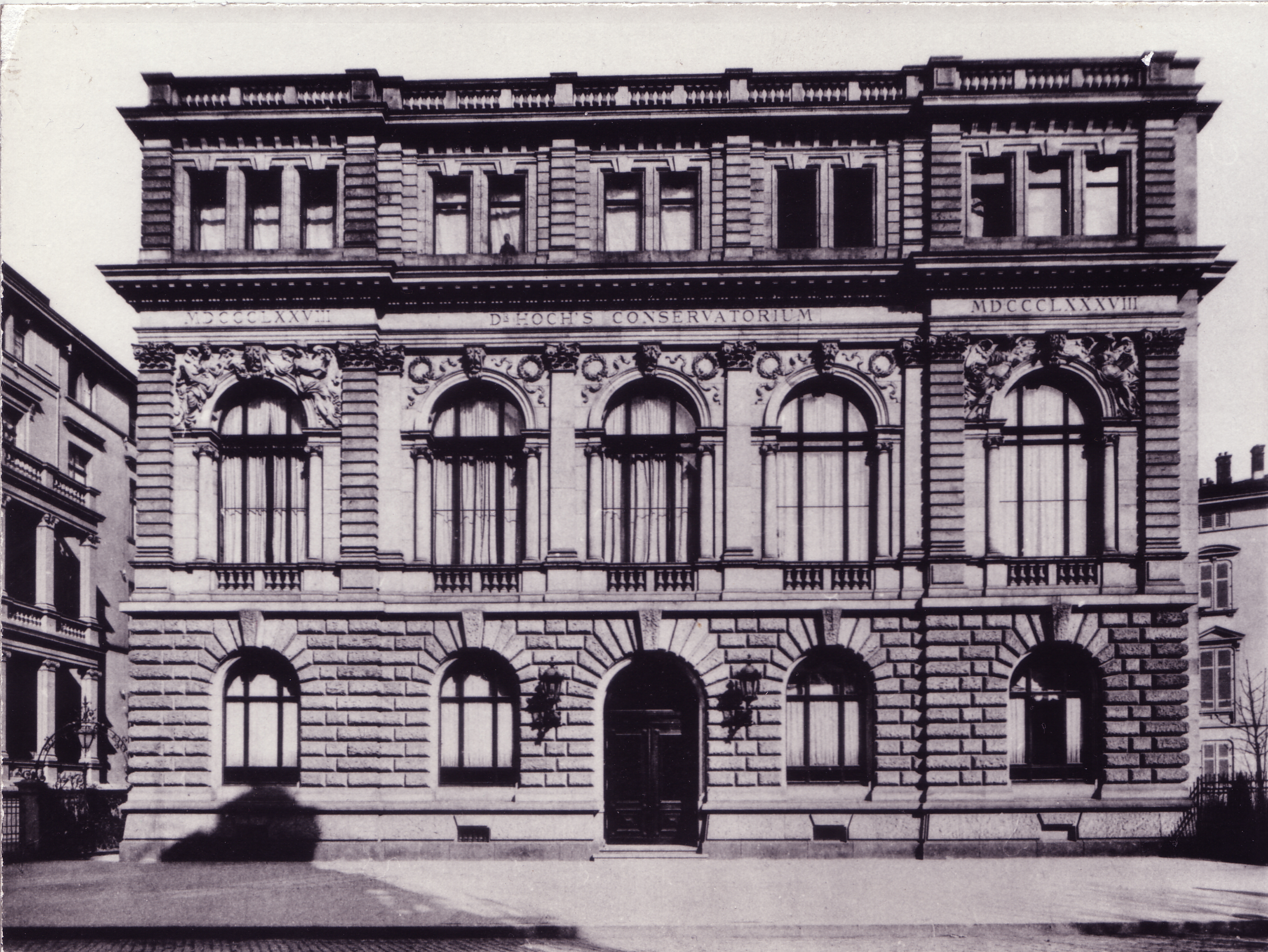
Eschenheimer Landstr. 4. Hoch Conservatory, c. 1900. Home of the conservatory, 1888–1943

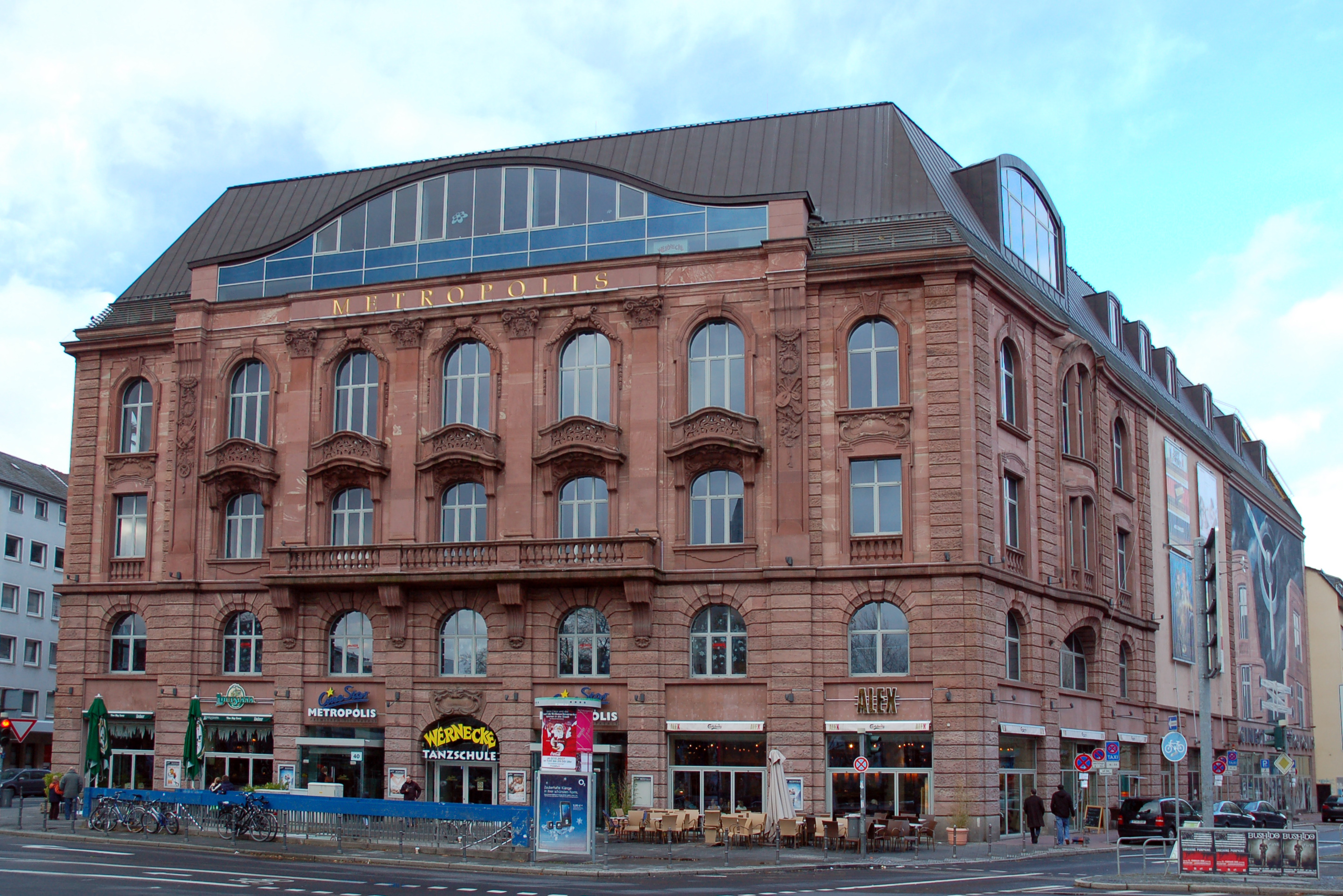
Eschenheimer Landstr. 4. Volksbildungsheim. Home of the conservatory, 1951–1988

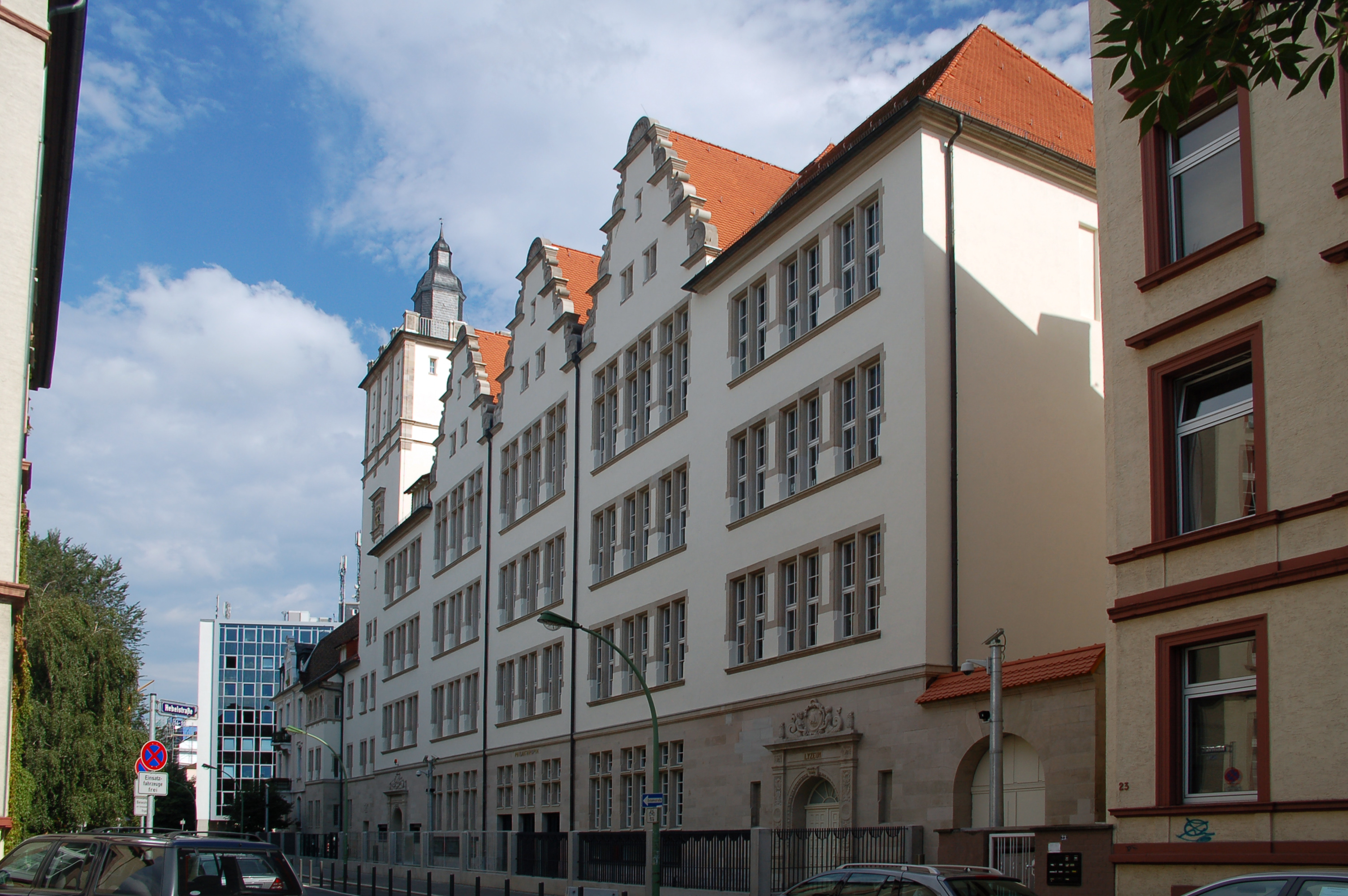
Philanthropin Frankfurt: Home of the conservatory, 1986–2004

- 1857: 14 July: Dr. Joseph Hoch (1815–74) makes the conservatory foundation the main heir of his fortune.
- 1874: Dr. Hoch dies on 19 September.
- 1876: The foundation is officially recognized (16 March).
- 1877: 16 February: Recognition of the foundation's governing body by the Frankfurt Magistrate, Chairman Dr. Heinrich Mumm von Schwarzenstein (until 1890).
  June: Joachim Raff elected first director.
- 1878: 22 September: Opening ceremony in the Frankfurt Saalhof.
  20 October: Clara Schumann's 50th anniversary as a performer.
- 1879: 10 February: first internal student concert.
  9 June: Frankfurt visit by Franz Liszt.
- 1880: Differences between Raff and Julius Stockhausen, who resigns on 1 September.
- 1882: Joachim Raff dies on 24 June. His successor, Bernhard Scholz, appointed on 11. November.
- 1883: 21. January: Secession of the followers of Raff, which leads in April to the opening of the Raff-Konservatorium.
  21. March: Bernhard Scholz takes over as director.
- 1884: Julius Stockhausen resigns for a second time (1 April).
  September: Opening of the Seminar (Director: Iwan Knorr).
- 1886: September: Opening of the prep-school: Hans Pfitzner studies (with scholarship) until 1890.
- 1888: 29. April: Inauguration of the new conservatory building.
- 1890: Dr. Theodor Mettenheimer takes over the chairmanship of the governors. State subvention for 2 scholarships. Engelbert Humperdincks begins teaching (1890–97).
- 1892: Clara Schumann retires. The conservatory takes over the training for the scholarships of the Mozart-Foundation.
- 1896: Clara Schumann dies on 20 May.
- 1901: Heinrich Hanau becomes chairman of the governors (until 1904).
- 1904: Emil Sulzbach called to be chairman (until 1923).
- 1908: Bernhard Scholz resigns. Iwan Knorr becomes director. Opening of the Orchestra School.
- 1909: Paul Hindemith receives a scholarship and is accepted as a student of Rebner.
- 1916: Iwan Knorr dies 22 January. In September Waldemar von Baußnern takes over as director.
- 1918: Opening of the Singing School Seminar.
- 1921: Tension between the governors and director. Inflation forces the foundation to ask for subventions from the city and the state of Hesse. Plans for a "Hochschule" for Frankfurt (Leo Kestenberg).
- 1923: 27 April Waldemar von Bausznern retires. Hermann Scherchen applies for the job of director. Resignation of Emil Sulzbach.
- 1924: Bernhard Sekles appointed director. Opening of the Opera School. Dr. Oswald Feis becomes chairman of the foundation.
- 1926: Seminar for private music teachers and »Conservatory for listeners of Music« opened.
- 1928: Opening of the first academic Jazz classes anywhere under the direction of Mátyás Seiber. Concerts held in the "Volksbildungsheim" (Hermann von Schmeidel).
- 1931: Courses in Children's Musical Pedagogy.
- 1933: Dismissal of the director Bernhard Sekles and all Jewish and foreign teachers (10 April).
  Dr. Hans Rumpf becomes chairman of the foundation and Bertil Wetzelsberger director.
  17 October: Opening of the »Hochschule für Musik und Theater der Stadt Frankfurt am Main« without permission of the Ministry of Culture. Growing influence of Artistic Director Hans Meißner.
- 1936: Hermann Reutter becomes director.
- 1937: 19 October: Contract between the City of Frankfurt and the foundation Dr. Hoch's Konservatorium concerning the establishing of a state "Hochschule" for Music.
- 1938: 1 April: Opening of the state "Hochschule". The conservatory downgraded to a prep-school.
- 1943: 4 October: the Conservatory building is hit by aircraft bombing. Move to the Passavant-Gontard'sche Palais.
- 1944: February: Passavant-Gontard'sche Palais also destroyed.
- 1947: Reopening of the Department of Church Music in April and the Department of School Music in the autumn.
- 1950: Walther Davisson becomes Artistic Director of the "Hochschule".
- 1951: Recommencing of teaching in a building constructed on the ruins at Eschenheimer Landstr. 4 (Volksbildungsheim). Chairman of the foundation also functions as city councillor.
- 1954: A board of directors installed for the Musikhochschule and the Conservatory.
- 1958: Philipp Mohler becomes director of the unified "Hochschule" and Dr. Hoch's Konservatorium.
- 1967: The Frankfurt Magistrate nullifies the 1937 contract.
- 1971: Plans for joining the conservatory with the Musikhochschule cause resistance. The conservatory becomes a stepping stone between a music school and the Musikhochschule.
- 1973: Philipp Mohler resigns as director of the conservatory. Klaus Volk becomes director of the unified Conservatory and Musikhochschule.
- 1977: Klaus Volk resigns. Prof. Hans Dieter Resch, rector of the "Musikhochschule", becomes provisional director, and in 1978 Alois Kottmann.
- 1979: Frank Stähle becomes director. Under his direction the conservatory is restructured and again becomes an institute for training professional musicians.
- 1986: Alterations begin at the Philanthropin, a former Jewish school in Frankfurt's North End. Move to the Philanthropin takes place in stages: 1986–1989.
- 1989: Move to Philanthropin completed. Opening ceremonies on 9 February. Stadträtin Jutta Ebeling replaces Bernhard Mihm as chairperson of the foundation.
- 2002: Dr. Hoch's Konservatorium is given the status of Music Academy.
- 2005: Move to the newly built Education Center Ostend (BZO).
- 2007: Frank Stähle retires and Werner Wilde becomes provisional director for one year.
- 2008: Mario Liepe is appointed director.

== Directors ==
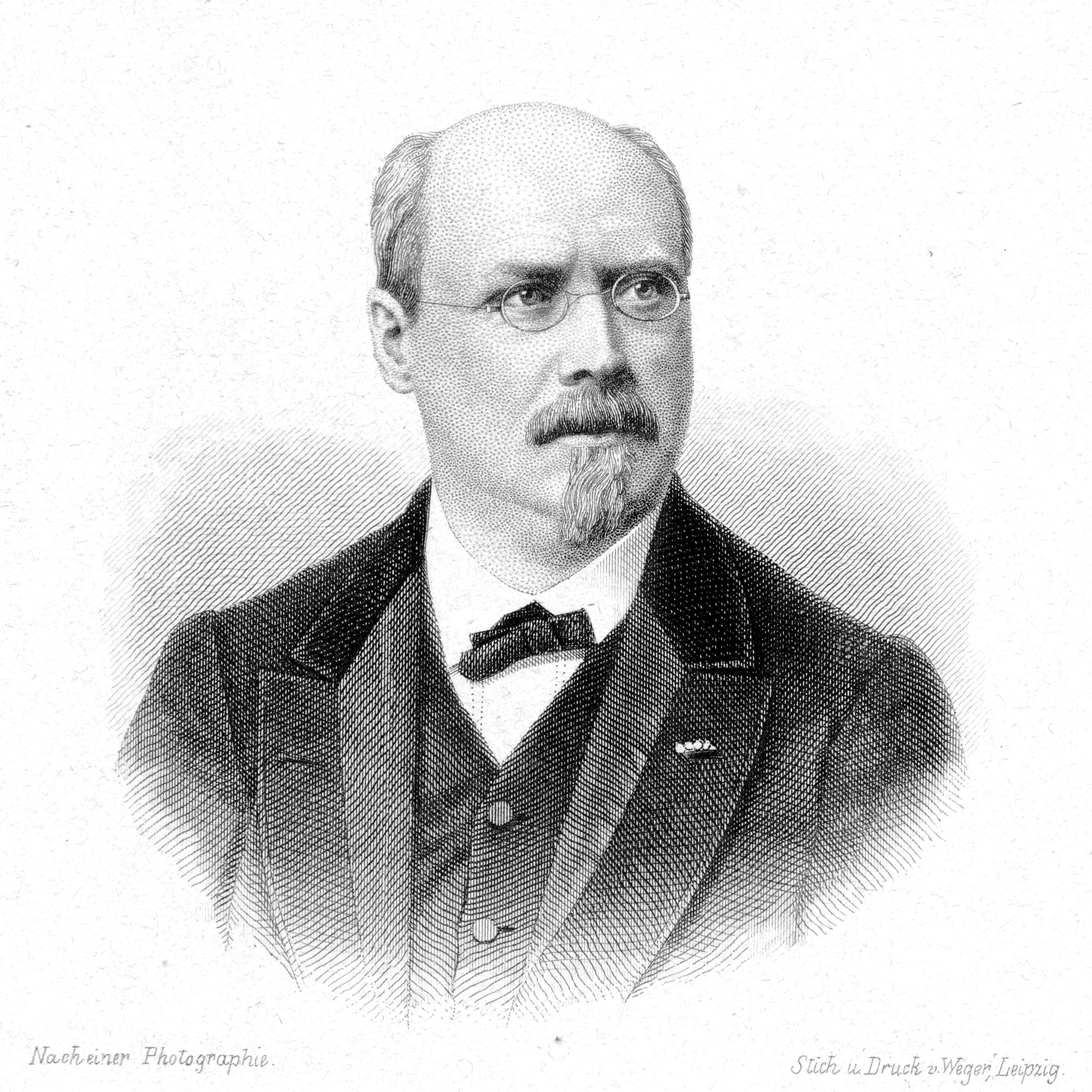
The first director: Joachim Raff in 1878

- 1878–1882: Joseph Joachim Raff
- 1883–1908: Bernhard Scholz
- 1908–1916: Iwan Knorr
- 1916–1923: Waldemar von Baußnern (also: von Bausznern)
- 1924–1933: Bernhard Sekles
- 1933–1936: Bertil Wetzelsberger
- 1936–1944: Hermann Reutter
- 1950–1954: Walther Davisson
- 1954–1958: Helmut Walcha, Erich Flinsch, Gustav Lenzewski
- 1958–1973: Philipp Mohler
- 1973–1977: Klaus Volk
- 1977–1979: Hans Dieter Resch, Alois Kottmann
- 1979–2007: Frank Stähle
- 2007–2008: Werner Wilde (Provisional director)
- 2008–2018: Mario Liepe
- 2018–2022: Christian Heynisch, Caroline Prassel, Karin Franke-André (directorate)
- 2022–2025: Fabian Rieser, Caroline Prassel, Karin Franke-André (directorate)
- since 2025: Fabian Rieser, Caroline Prassel (directorate)

== Teachers and students ==
=== Notable teachers ===
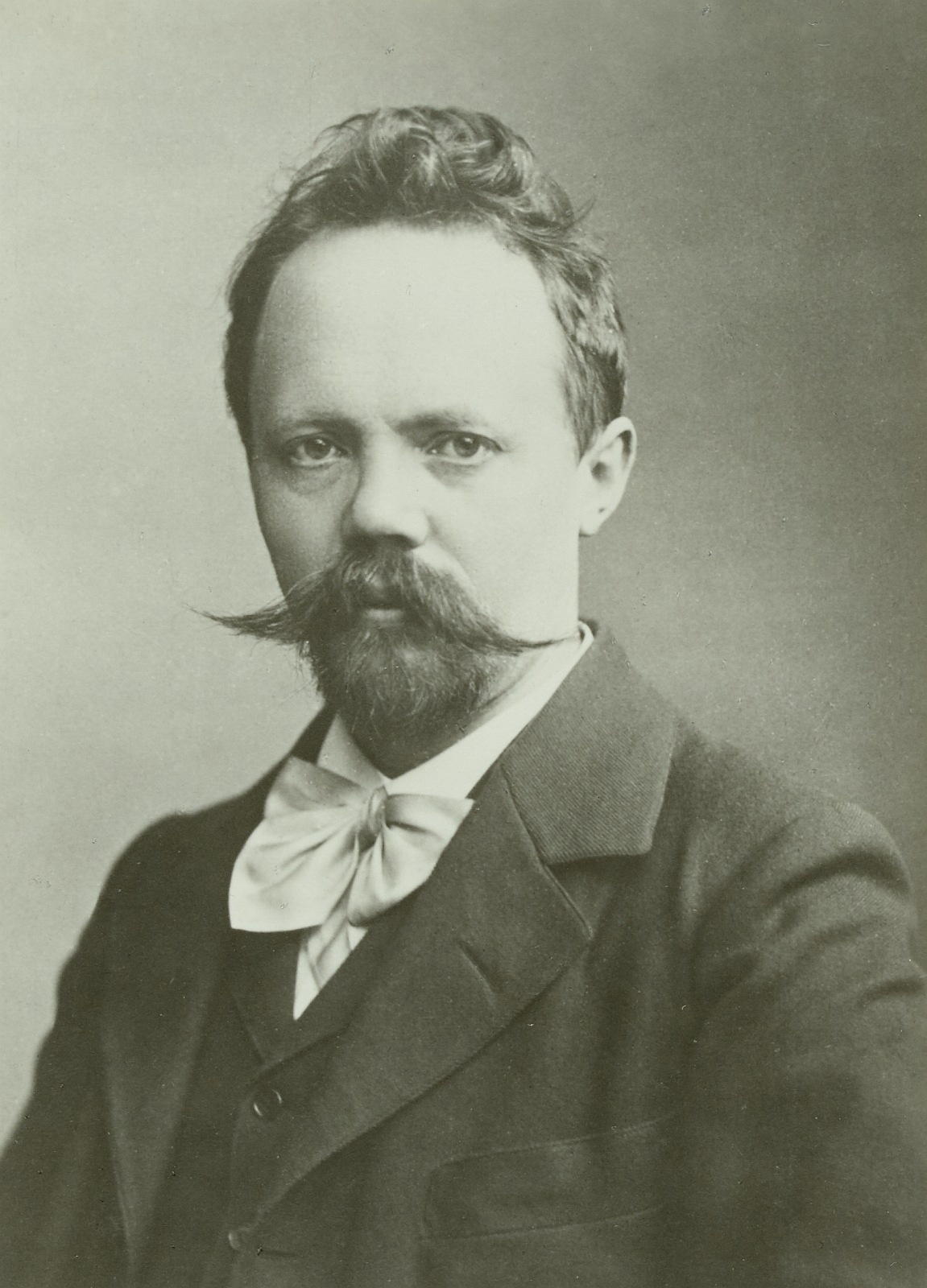
Engelbert Humperdinck composed Hänsel und Gretel c. 1891 in Frankfurt

- 1878–1910: Bernhard Cossmann
- 1878–1904: Hugo Heermann
- 1878–1880: Carl Heymann
- 1878–1882: Joachim Raff
- 1878–1892: Clara Schumann
- 1878–1880 and 1883–84: Julius Stockhausen
- 1878–1883: Anton Urspruch
- 1882–1907: Lazzaro Uzielli
- 1883–1908: Iwan Knorr
- 1883–1902: James Kwast
- 1884–1923: Ernst Engesser
- 1890–1897: Engelbert Humperdinck
- 1893–1904: Carl Friedberg (also: Karl)
- 1894–1906: Hugo Becker
- 1895–1897: Marie Hanfstängl
- 1896–1933: Bernhard Sekles
- 1899–1912: Johannes Hegar
- 1904–1908: Hermann Zilcher
- 1904–1907 and 1908–1933: Adolf Rebner
- 1905–1906: Johannes Messchaert (also: Johan)
- 1906–1933: Alfred Auerbach
- 1908–1916 and 1929–1942: Alfred Hoehn
- 1912–1917: Margarete Dessoff
- 1926–1928: Hermine Bosetti
- 1926–1932: Ludwig Rottenberg
- 1928–1933: Mátyás Seiber (Director of the first academic Jazz department)
- 1930–1933: Herbert Graf (Opera School)
- 1933–1938: Helmut Walcha
- 1933–1942: Kurt Hessenberg
- 1933–1945: Gerhard Frommel
- 1936–1940: Anton Biersack
- 1954–1974: Peter Cahn
- 1958–19??: Alois Kottmann
- 1976–1982: Albert Mangelsdorff
- 1985–1996: Richard Rudolf Klein
- 1981–2000: Gerhard Schedl

=== Notable students ===
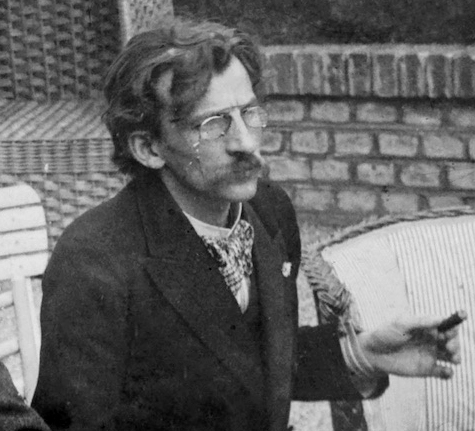
Hans Pfitzner studied composition and piano at the conservatory

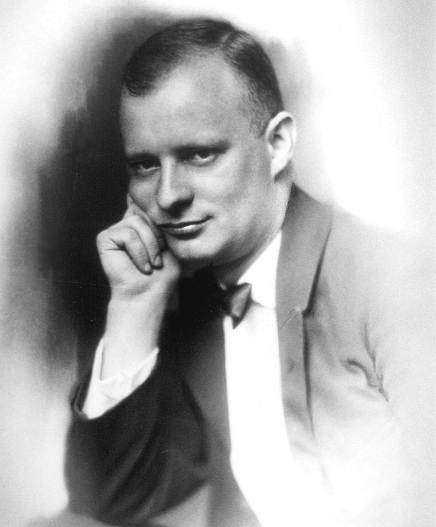
Paul Hindemith aged 28 (1923). Hindemith studied violin and composition at the Conservatory

- 1879–1882: Edward MacDowell
- 1886–1890: Hans Pfitzner
- 1891–1893 and 1896–1899: Cyril Scott (Frankfurt Group)
- 1893–1895: Margarete Dessoff
- 1893–1897: Norman O'Neill (Frankfurt Group)
- 1894–1896: Henry Balfour Gardiner (Frankfurt Group)
- 1894–1901: Walter Braunfels
- 1895–1900: Percy Grainger (Frankfurt Group)
- 1895–1903: Johanna Senfter
- 1895–1898: Hans Jelmoli
- 1896–1898: Hermann Noetzel
- 1897–1901: Roger Quilter (Frankfurt Group)
- 1898–1903: Boris Hambourg
- 1900–1901: Ernest Bloch
- 1901–1902: Otto Klemperer
- 1903–1909: Reinhard Oppel
- 1904–1907: Hans Gebhard-Elsaß
- 1904–1908: Frederick Septimus Kelly
- 1906–1908: Hans Bund
- 1908–1910: Richard Tauber
- 1909–1917: Paul Hindemith
- 1909–1913: Ernst Toch
- 1913–1916 and 1918–1920: Ottmar Gerster
- ca. 1915 : Hans Rosbaud
- 1917–1931: Kurt Hessenberg
- 1924–1927: Alexander Schneider

=== Teachers ===
- Alma Moodie
- since 2005: Barbara Zechmeister

=== Students ===
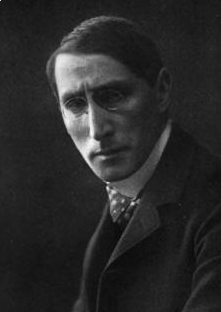
Oskar Fried, studied 1891–92 with Iwan Knorr

- Vladimír Ambros
- Caroline Valentin
- Frederic Austin
- Erich Bender
- Carlo Bohländer
- Franz Magnus Böhme
- Leonard Borwick
- Hans Bund
- Catherine Carswell
- Torsten de Winkel
- Moritz Eggert
- Agnes Fink
- Ernst Fischer
- Clemens von und zu Franckenstein
- Oskar Fried
- Else Gentner-Fischer
- Frank Gerhardt
- Konrad Georg
- Heinz Gietz
- Ria Ginster
- Eugen Henkel
- Daniel Hensel
- Herbie Hess
- Robin Hoffmann
- Alfred Hollins
- Erich Itor Kahn
- Alice Kaluza
- Hans Klotz
- Christof Lauer
- Tiana Lemnitz
- Uli Lenz
- Emil Mangelsdorff
- Annette Marquard
- Heinz Moog
- Sibylle Nicolai
- Olga Radecki
- Walter Rehberg
- Max Rudolf
- Fritzi Scheff
- Erich Schmid
- Dietrich Schulz-Köhn
- Johanna Senfter
- Hermine Spies
- Rudi Stephan
- Stefan Thomas
- Richard Trunk
- Hans-Jürgen von Bose
- Hermann Hans Wetzler
- Heike Matthiesen

== Legacy ==
The German Federal Bank honored the conservatory on the reverse side of the former 100 DM bill with a picture of the original conservatory building, unfortunately bombed in World War II. Clara Schumann, the first piano teacher, is pictured on the front side of the bill.
