= Bernhard Scholz =

German composer and teacher (1835–1916)

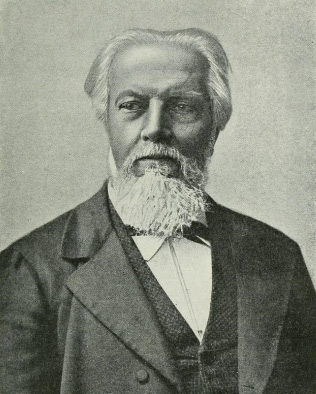
- Scholz before 1908
- Born: 30 March 1835; Mainz, Grand Duchy of Hesse
- Died: 26 December 1916 (aged 81); Munich, German Empire
- Occupations: Conductor; Composer; Pedagogue
- Organizations: Munich Conservatory; Hoch Conservatory

Bernhard E. Scholz, (30 March 1835 – 26 December 1916) was a German conductor, composer and teacher of music.

== Life ==
Bernhard Scholz was born in Mainz in 1835. He was intended by his father to take over his father's business (Lithographische Druckerei und Verlag Jos. Scholz) and studied to be a printer at Imp. Lemercier in Paris. But music became his career. He was a student of Ernst Pauer (piano) in Mainz, and 1855-56 of Siegfried Dehn (counterpoint) in Berlin. He also took voice lessons with Antonio Sangiovanni in Milan.

He first taught at the Munich Conservatory and was court Kapellmeister in Zürich, Nuremberg and 1859-65 in Hanover. Between 1865 and 1866 he was director of the Cherubini Society in Florence and also taught at the Stern Conservatory and the Kullak Conservatory. From 1871-83 he directed the Orchestra Society in Breslau. In 1883 he was appointed director of the Hoch Conservatory in Frankfurt, a post he held until 1908.

He died in Munich in 1916.

His Piano Concerto was championed by Clara Schumann, who included it in her repertory.

He was one of four signatories to an anti-"Music of the Future" (anti-New-Weimar-School) Manifesto published in the Berliner Musik-Zeitung Echo on 6 May 1860, along with Johannes Brahms (possibly its author), Joseph Joachim and Julius Otto Grimm.

== Works ==
- Carlo Rosa, opera (1858 in Munich)
- Ziethen'sche Husaren, opera (1869 in Breslau)
- Morgiane, opera (1870 in Munich)
- Golo, opera (1875 in Nürnberg)
- Der Trompeter von Säkkingen, opera (1877 in Wiesbaden)
- Die vornehmen Wirte, opera (1883 in Leipzig)
- Ingo, opera (1898 in Frankfurt)
- Anno 1757, opera (1903 in Berlin)
- Mirandolina, opera (1907 in Darmstadt)
- Choral music with orchestra
- 2 symphonies
- Piano concerto in B major, Op. 57 (published 1883)
- 2 string quartets
- String quintet
- Piano quartet
- 2 piano trios
- 3 violin sonatas
- 5 cello sonatas
- Piano music
- Lieder

== Publications ==
- Lehre vom Kontrapunkt und der Nachahmung, 1897
- Wohin treiben wir?, 1897 (a collection of essays)
- Musikalisches und Persönliches, 1899
- Verklungene Weisen, 1911
- Sigfried Dehn: Lehre vom Kontrapunkt, dem Kanon und der Fuge, (Bernhard Scholz, Ed.) 1859/2. Edition: 1883
