= Tiana Lemnitz =

German operatic soprano

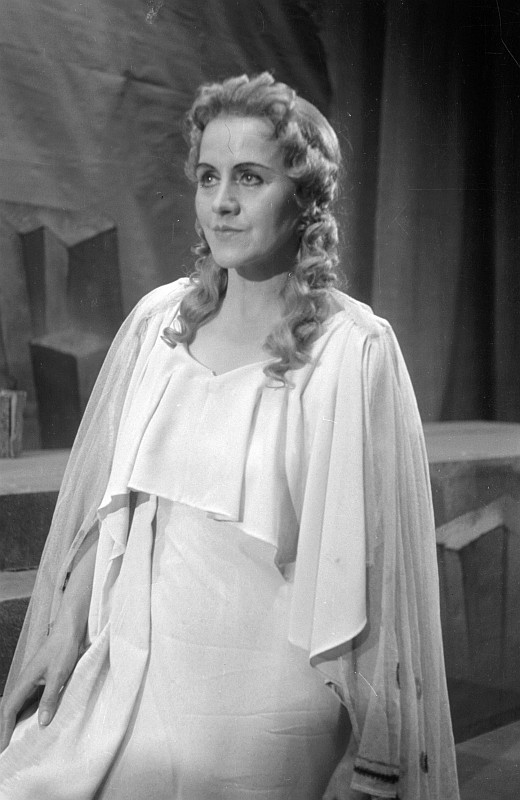
- Lemnitz as Eurydice in Orpheus and Eurydice by Christoph Willibald von Gluck
- Born: 26 October 1897; Metz, Germany
- Died: 5 February 1994 (aged 96); Berlin, Germany
- Education: Hoch Conservatory, Frankfurt
- Occupation: Operatic soprano

Tiana Lemnitz (26 October 1897 – 5 February 1994) was a German operatic soprano. Her major operatic career took place between the two world wars (1919–1939).

== Life and career ==
The youngest of 10 children, she was born in Metz to a musical family. Her father was a Militärkappellmeister. She began to sing at the age of seven and at 15 she entered the Metz Music School. Later, she studied voice with Antoni Kohmann at the Hoch Conservatory in Frankfurt. Starting with small opera companies, she made her debut in Heilbronn in Albert Lortzing's opera Undine in 1921. She then sang in Aachen (1922–28), Hannover (1928–34) while making several guest appearances in Dresden (1931–34). In 1930 she sang in Sopot as Agathe in Der Freischütz.

She became a member of the Berlin Staatsoper in 1934, and remained with the company until 1957. She also sang regularly at the Munich State Opera, the Vienna State Opera and the Salzburg Festival.

Lemnitz was a prominent Nazi and was known to boast of having been appointed to the Berlin State Opera by Hermann Göring, commander-in-chief of the Luftwaffe.

In 1936, she made guest appearances at the Royal Opera House in London and at the Teatro Colón in Buenos Aires. She sang Marguerite in Faust in Warsaw in 1937 next to the Mephisto of Feodor Chaliapin.

Her repertory included Euridice in Orfeo ed Euridice, Countess Almaviva in Le nozze di Figaro, Pamina in Die Zauberflöte, Elisabeth in Tannhäuser, Elsa in Lohengrin, Eva in Die Meistersinger von Nürnberg, Sieglinde in Die Walküre, Octavian and Marshallin in Der Rosenkavalier, the title role in Arabella, Micaela in Carmen, Elvira in Ernani, the title role in Aida, Desdemona in Otello. She also took an interest in Slavic operas and became a noted interpreter of operas such as Dalibor, Jenůfa, Wozzeck.

Lemnitz was also admired as a recitalist notably in Lieder. In 1937, she was awarded the title of Kammersängerin. She began recording in 1934 for Polydor with arias from Der Freischütz and Lohengrin. She recorded for Electrola in Germany (1937–48) and for His Master's Voice (1938–9).

Tiana Lemnitz died in Berlin in 1994 at the age of 96.

== Assessment ==
According to Musical America:

But what mere adijectives can do justice to the Elizabeth of Tiana Lemnitz! This beautiful voice, this superlative vocalism, this absolute supremacy of the technical and the interpretative in which the very economy of gesture lent the whole a spiritual grandeur! It was wonderful, and although Furtwängler’s orchestra contributed much to the effect, Lemnitz remained unique in the perfection of her performance and her triumph.

An English reviewer wrote: "The greatest moment of the evening came in the quintet [of Meistersinger]. Lemnitz, beginning the movement, sang so beautifully that—without being rude—one was conscious of nothing else."

Lemnitz said of herself: "I am very earnest in my art and consider it as a holy legacy which shall procure some of the higher sense of life to the people."

== Sources ==
- Operissimo.com (in German)
