= Hermann Noetzel =

German composer and conductor

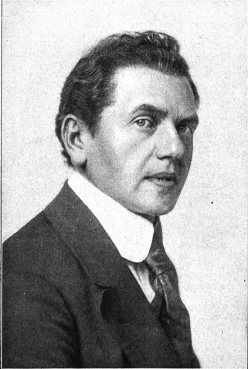
Hermann Noetzel in 1919

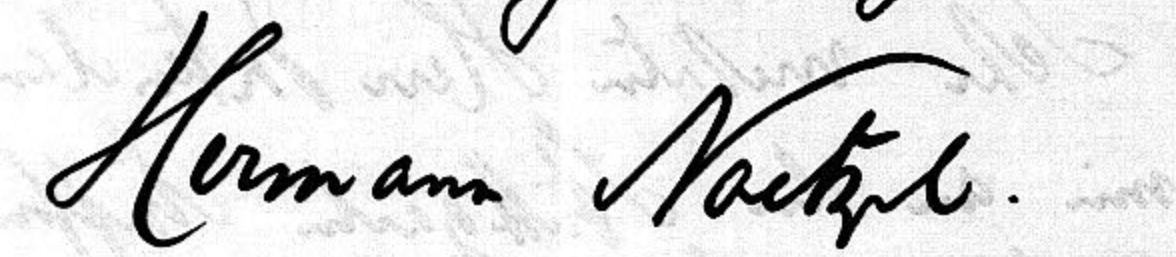
Signature of Hermann Noetzel

Hermann Noetzel (Wiesbaden, 10 April 1880 – Starnberg, 8 March 1951) was a German composer and conductor.

== Early life and career ==
His father Wilhelm Noetzel (1838–1910) was a merchant and small-scale industrialist originally from Tilsit (now Sovetsk), East Prussia, who settled in Wiesbaden, where Noetzel was born. He studied piano at the Hoch Conservatory in Frankfurt with James Kwast from 1896 to 1898 before moving to Sondershausen to pursue conducting. After guest conducting posts in Munich, Merseburg, and Koblenz, he devoted himself entirely to composition.

== Public success and eclipse ==
The peak of Noetzel's career as a composer was the premiere of his comic opera Meister Guido in 1918. The work received an extraordinarily enthusiastic response from both critics and audiences, and was subsequently performed in 20 other venues. He also composed orchestral music and lieder.

In the 1920s, Noetzel increasingly withdrew from public life, and his works fell from the repertoire, although they were revived at the urging of the Reich Chamber of Music. However, Noetzel was not a proponent of the Third Reich, and it is unlikely that he himself sought the revival. During the social and political turbulence of the Nazi era in the 1930s, he and his wife Leonore Goedhart Noetzel left Munich and moved to a house at Lake Starnberg. Little is known about his final years.

== Selected works ==
=== Stage works ===
- Meister Guido, Komische Oper in 3 Akten. Libretto by the composer. Premiere 15 September 1918, Karlsruhe. Revived in the same city, 1937.
- Pierrots Sommernacht, Ballet-Pantomime in 1 Akt. Premiere 1924, Munich.
- Die Saligen, Oper in 3 Akten. Unperformed.
- Yvonne, Romantische Oper. Unperformed. (1930)

=== Orchestral music ===
- Fasching-Ouvertüre (1925)
- Frau Aventiure. Ouvertüre
- Cyclus aus dem Süden (1904/1910)
- Symphony No. 1 in A Major (1902)
- Symphony No. 2 in G minor (1905)
- Symphony No. 3 in one movement, "Der Ozean" (1905)
- Theater music for Der Traum ein Leben (1906)
