= Antonio Sangiovanni =

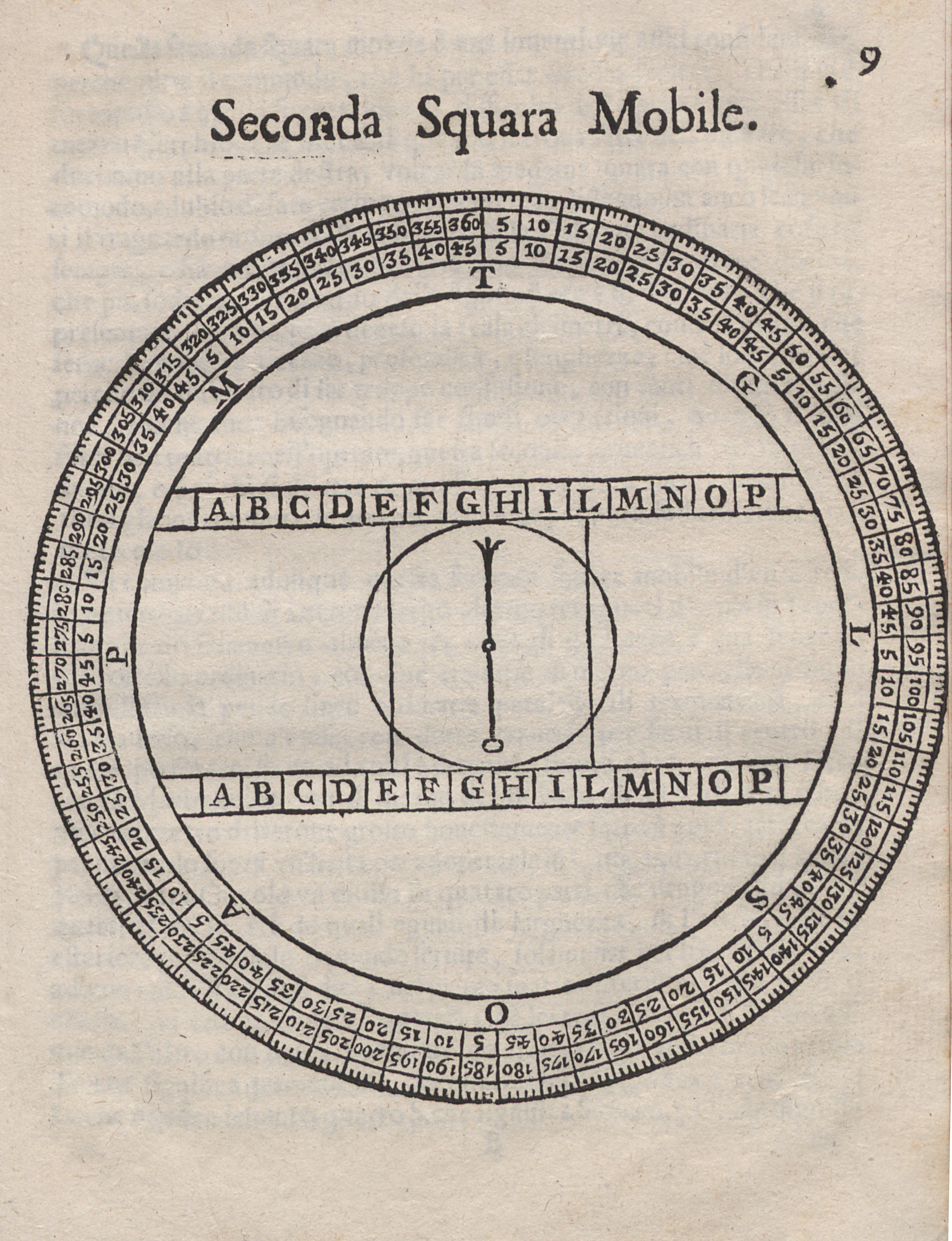
An illustration from Seconda squara mobile, et aritmetica, 1686

Antonio Sangiovanni (or San Giovanni) was a 17th-century Italian agronomist and mathematician.

A nobleman from Vicenza, he wrote Seconda squara mobile, a noteworthy work in the field of geometry.

== Works ==
- Seconda squara mobile, et aritmetica (in Italian). Vicenza: Giovanni Berno. 1686.
