= Anton Biersack =

German composer and music educator (1907–1982)

Anton Biersack (30 November 1907, Greding – 18 November 1982, Frankfurt) was a German composer and music educator. After initial studied in music in Eichstätt, he studied music composition, conducting, piano, and organ at the Hochschule für Musik Würzburg from 1928 to 1932. From 1932 to 1936, he was a fellow at the Hoch Conservatory in Frankfurt am Main. He joined the staff of that conservatory in 1936 where he spent the next 4 years teaching music theory and directing the youth orchestra. Military service interrupted his career from 1940 to 1945. He then worked as a conductor of student choral and orchestral ensembles at the Frankfurt University of Music and Performing Arts (FUMPA) before being appointed a lecturer at that school in 1947. He was made head of orchestral studies at the FUMPA in 1957 and was appointed full professor at the school in 1960. He was married to Agathe Biersack (née Laur ) (1910–1996).

== Sources ==
- Anton Biersack at the German National Library
