= Erich Itor Kahn =

German composer

Erich Itor Kahn (23 July 1905 - 5 March 1956) was a German composer of Jewish descent, who emigrated to the United States during the years of National Socialism.

== Biography ==
He was born in Rimbach in the Odenwald, the son of Leopold Kahn, a mathematician and synagogue cantor. He studied piano and composition at the Hoch Conservatory in Frankfurt, where his teachers included Paul Franzen and Bernhard Sekles; he concluded his studies in 1928, although he had been giving public recitals of classical and contemporary repertoire since 1919. He then worked for Radio Frankfurt as a pianist, harpsichordist, composer and arranger, reporting to Hans Rosbaud, director of the Radio's music department.

In April 1933 he was dismissed from his post by the Nazis and emigrated to Paris with his wife Frida (née Rabinowitch). At the beginning of World War II he was interned as an enemy alien at the Camp des Milles in the southeastern France;. In 1955, after giving a piano recital, Kahn suffered a cerebral haemorrhage and spent many months in a coma until his death at Mount Sinai Hospital in New York. Kahn wrote several distinctive keyboard works including the Ciaconna dei tempi di guerra (1943) composed for Ralph Kirkpatrick to play on the harpsichord, though it is also performable on piano.
