= Margarete Dessoff =

- Margarete Dessoff in 1926

Background information
- Born: June 11, 1874
- Origin: German
- Died: November 19, 1944 (aged 70) Locarno, Switzerland
- Occupations: Choral conductor; singer; voice teacher

Emma Margarete "Gretchen" Dessoff (11 June 1874 – 19 November 1944) was a German choral conductor, singer, and voice teacher.

== Life ==
=== Germany ===
The young Margarete Dessoff

Margarete (sometimes incorrectly spelled Margarethe) Dessoff was born in Vienna and came to Frankfurt am Main when she was six years old, her father (Felix Otto Dessoff) having been appointed conductor of the Frankfurt Opera House. Dessoff studied voice with Gustav Gunz and Marie Schröder-Hanfstängl (1892–97) at Dr. Hoch's Konservatorium in Frankfurt and from 1912 directed the women's chorus there. Dessoff's singing career was cut short when a famous opera singer (probably Hanfstängl) teaching at Dr. Hoch's apparently ruined her voice. She regained it through private lessons (with Jenny Hahn, a pupil of Julius Stockhausen), but had she not lost her voice she might never have become a well-known and well-loved choral director. In addition to the Dessoff'scher Frauenchor (first concert in 1907 at Dr. Hoch's Konservatorium), which quickly became famous throughout Germany, she also directed the Frankfurter Bachgemeinde for several years and in 1918 founded one of the first madrigal ensembles in Germany.

=== New York ===
During the time that Margarete Dessoff lived in Frankfurt, the Dessoff family home was across the street from the aunt and uncle of the American banker Felix Warburg. As a boy, Mr. Warburg came to know Margarete Dessoff from visits to his uncle's house, and it was this friendship which moved him to bring her to America for a holiday following the strain of the First World War.

The Institute of Musical Art (later Juilliard School of Music) in New York City had been founded in 1905 with the European conservatories as its model. Earlier, many young musicians had felt the need to study in Europe: American Edward MacDowell and Australian Percy Grainger both studied at the Konservatorium in Frankfurt. Having Clara Schumann on the faculty had made Dr. Hoch's Konservatorium very well known internationally: in 1890 there were 23 Americans and 46 from England studying there. Several teachers from Dr. Hoch's Konservatorium taught later at Juilliard. At the height of inflation in the 1920s Margarete Dessoff answered an invitation to become chorus director there, where she also established the Madrigal Chorus. She founded various other choirs in the 1920s: in 1924 with Angela Diller, she formed the Adesdi Chorus of Women's Voices, with the name Adesdi being formed from parts of each of the founders' name; then in 1929 she founded a mixed voice choir, The New York A Cappella Singers, and in 1930 these two became "The Dessoff Choirs" which meant that both choirs gave their concerts together with programs that contained pieces for women's voices (sung by Adesdi) and for mixed voices (sung by the New York A Cappella Singers). She also founded the Vecchi Singers with whom she conducted the first American performance of Orazio Vecchi's L'Amfiparnaso in 1933.

Margarete Dessoff was committed to the performance of rarely heard early music as well as unknown works of young composers. Her artistically planned programs encouraged contemporary composers such as Hans Gál, Erwin Lendvai, Hugo Herrmann, Marion Bauer, Lazare Saminsky and others to write new music for choirs.

=== Retirement ===
Her newly founded choirs in New York flourished until her early retirement, due to an accident, in 1936. As a return to Nazi Germany was impossible for her, she retired to Locarno, Switzerland, where she died in 1944.

Her name still lives on in New York where the Dessoff Choirs which she founded, still flourishes.
