= Felix Otto Dessoff =

German conductor and composer

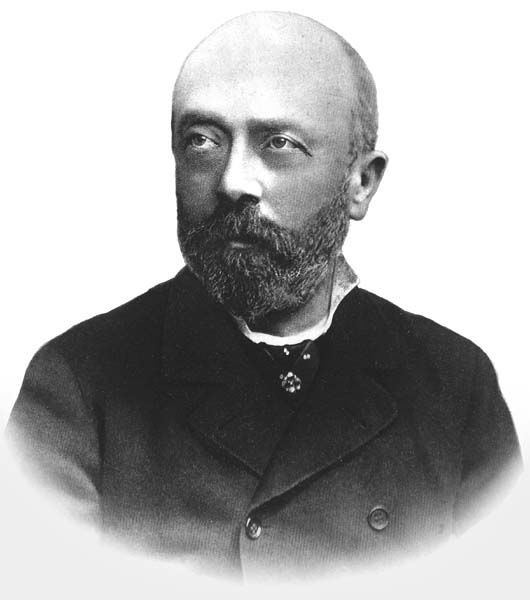

Felix Otto Dessoff (14 January 1835 – 28 October 1892) was a German conductor and composer.

== Biography ==
Dessoff was born to a Jewish family in Leipzig; his father was a cloth merchant. His musical talent was recognized by Franz Liszt, who then advised his family on his musical training.

As a student at the Leipzig Conservatory from 1851–54, Dessoff studied composition, piano and conducting with some of the foremost teachers of the day, including Ignaz Moscheles for piano and Moritz Hauptmann and Julius Rietz for composition. On November 16, 1853, a symphony of his was performed by the Leipzig Gewandhaus Orchestra; the following day he met Johannes Brahms, with whom he formed a lasting friendship and artistic relationship.

It was as a conductor that he primarily established his reputation. His first conducting post was at Actien Theater in Chemnitz. After that, he was successively director of music in Altenburg, Düsseldorf, Kassel, Aachen and Magdeburg. In 1860 he was offered a position with the Vienna Court Opera.

In 1860, the Vienna Philharmonic elected Otto Dessoff to be its subscription conductor, a position he held until 1875. The Vienna-based music critic, newspaper editor, and biographer Max Kalbeck wrote in 1908 that the fame and excellence of the Vienna Philharmonic resulted from Dessoff's "energy and sense of purpose."

Dr Clemens Hellsberg, the president of the Vienna Philharmonic, specifies that during Dessoff's tenure with that orchestra its "repertoire was consistently enlarged, important organizational principles (music archives, rules of procedure) were introduced and the orchestra moved to its third new home [in which it still performs]. At the beginning of the 1870/71 season it began playing in the newly built Goldener Saal in the Musikverein building in Vienna, which has proved to be the ideal venue, with its acoustical characteristics influencing the orchestra's style and sound."

In Vienna, beginning in 1861 Dessoff also taught composition at the Gesellschaft der Musikfreunde (the forerunner of the Vienna Conservatory). His students included Arthur Nikisch and Felix Mottl. See: List of music students by teacher: C to F#Felix Otto Dessoff. Although he composed into the early 1860s, he gave up composing when his career as a conductor blossomed.

During Dessoff's tenure with the Vienna Philharmonic, "Brahms was invited to dinner in his home after every Sunday concert - Frau Frederike [Dessoff's wife] was a good cook.".

In 1875, Dessoff was "pushed out of his position in Vienna through intrigue" according to Styra Avins, but immediately found a new position as conductor (Hofkapellmeister) of the Badische Staatskapelle in Karlsruhe, Germany, succeeding Hermann Levi.

In October, 1876 (circa the 11th), Brahms wrote to Dessoff hinting that he would like him conduct the first performance of his long-awaited Symphony no. 1, saying "It was always a secret, fond wish of mine to hear the thing for the first time in the small town which has a good friend, good conductor, and good orchestra".

Dessoff was, according to Styra Avins, "overjoyed at Brahms's veiled request," and on November 4, 1876 the premiere took place with Brahms in attendance at the rehearsals and concert.

In 1880, Dessoff was appointed to the newly created position of "First Kapellmeister" (Ersten Kapellmeisters) at the Frankfurt Opera; he inaugurated the newly completed opera house (now known as the Alte Oper) on 20 October 1880 with a performance of Mozart's Don Giovanni.

Dessoff's close friendship with Brahms can be seen in an exchange of letters between the two in 1878 when Dessoff wished to dedicate what is probably his best known work, his String Quartet in F, Op. 7. Although it met with success in its premiere, Dessoff was still not sure it was worth publishing and sent the score to Brahms asking for his candid opinion and offering to dedicate to him.

Brahms wrote back praising the work and said, "...you would do me a great honor by writing my name over the quartet title—if need be then, we'll take the blows together should the public find it not to their liking."

Much gratified, Dessoff wrote back in a free and bantering way of the sort Brahms himself often penned, "...you will be relieved to see your name on the title page of the quartet preserved for posterity. When people have forgotten your German Requiem, people will then say, 'Brahms? Oh yes, he's the one to whom Dessoff's Op. 7 is dedicated!'"

He composed a string quintet for 2 violins, viola and 2 cellos, Op. 10, several Lieder (songs) and a choral book. He died in Frankfurt in 1892, aged 57. His daughter, Margarete Dessoff, founded the Dessoff Choirs when she stayed on in New York City during a family visit there.
