= Robin Hoffmann =

- Born: 18 February 1984 (age 41)
- Origin: Großenhain, Bezirk Dresden, East Germany
- Occupations: composer, orchestrator, arranger
- Years active: 2001–present
- Website: robin-hoffmann.com

Robin Hoffmann is a German composer, orchestrator, and arranger known for his work in film, television, musical theatre, game music, and concert music. He has contributed to projects such as Star Wars: Visions, Makoto Shinkai’s anime feature Suzume, and crossover concerts with artists including Chaka Khan and Anastacia. His compositions and orchestrations span award-winning films, live concerts, and major game soundtracks.

== Early life and education ==
Hoffmann studied at Hochschule für Musik Carl Maria von Weber, graduating with a diploma in composition, arrangement, and piano. His teachers included Rainer Lischka, Marko Lackner, Clemens Kühn, and Jochen Aldinger.

== Career ==
=== Film and television ===
Hoffmann began working on professional film scores at the age of 21, composing and recording a full orchestral score for the British comedy Save Angel Hope, starring Billy Boyd and Bernard Hill.

He went on to compose music for films including Morgen, ihr Luschen! – Der Ausbilder Schmidt Film, Tell, and Liebling, lass uns scheiden. His score for the World War I drama In Love and War contributed to the film winning both the Best Nordish Film and the Audience Award at the 24th Santa Barbara International Film Festival.

In 2020, Hoffmann composed the music for the short film A Father's Job, which received awards for Best Score at the Hollywood Gold Awards and the Long Story Shorts International Film Festival.

He orchestrated the score for an episode of Star Wars: Visions on Disney+ and worked on Makoto Shinkai's anime film Suzume, which was nominated for both the Golden Globe and Annie Awards in 2024. His recent orchestration work includes the anime series Leviathan on Netflix and the Warner Brothers family adventure film Treasure Trackers (2024), for which he composed the original score. The score received several accolades, including Best Original Score at the Global Film Festival Awards and a Silver Medal at the Global Music Awards. He composed the score for Drew Garcia’s short film The Way Up, which went viral on TikTok and Instagram in 2025, receiving over one million combined views.

=== Musical theatre ===
In 2009, Hoffmann co-composed the music for the Swiss musical Dällebach Kari, which received four Goldene ImScheinwerfer awards and two Prix Walo awards, including Best Musical/Theatre Production. The musical was revived in 2011, 2013, and again in 2023 at the Thuner Seespiele.

He arranged the music for Friedrichstadt-Palast Berlin’s 2016 production The One Grand Show, the most successful in the venue’s history. He also co-arranged its 2018 successor, VIVID – Grand Show.

=== Concert and crossover work ===
Hoffmann composes and arranges music for orchestras, big bands, and chamber ensembles. He was commissioned to write a violin concerto for Anna Karkowska and the London Symphony Orchestra, recorded at Abbey Road Studios.

He co-arranged orchestral concerts for the Retro Festival in 2024 and 2025, featuring Chaka Khan and Anastacia alongside the City Light Symphony Orchestra in Lucerne. He also contributed orchestrations for the crossover collaboration between Swiss rock band LOVEBUGS and the Basel Symphony Orchestra, as well as with soul singer Seven and the 21st Century Orchestra.

His pop collaborations include orchestral arrangements for Gary Barlow, Ronan Keating, Bonnie Tyler, Sophie Ellis-Bextor, Seven, and LOVEBUGS. He arranged tracks for the Classical 90s Dance albums (Vol. 2–4) by Alex Christensen, earning a Golden Record in Germany.

Hoffmann co-arranged and orchestrated the UK-touring show Ministry of Sound – The Annual Classical and arranged Lucy Kay’s album Dark Angel. He also contributed arrangements to Matthias Schweighöfer’s debut album Lachen Weinen Tanzen and worked on Sarah Connor’s 2016 ECHO Award performance.

In 2018, he orchestrated the Red Hot Chili Peppers' "Can't Stop" for a live performance at the Elbphilharmonie during a label release by Wladimir Klitschko.

=== Advertising and commercial campaigns ===
Hoffmann composed music for the John West Australia campaign Into the Woods and the 2018 Christmas campaign for Air New Zealand, both produced by Song Zu (now MassiveMusic Sydney). He also arranged the official sound branding for the 2022 Australian Open.

=== Game music ===
Hoffmann co-composed and arranged music for NCSOFT's game Lineage W. He has orchestrated music for several major game titles, including Batman: Arkham Shadow, Anno 1404, Anno 2205, Halo Legends, Kinect Rush: A Disney Pixar Adventure, and Black Prophecy. In 2017, he orchestrated selections from Chris Huelsbeck’s Turrican series for live orchestra.

=== Live orchestration and performances ===
As an orchestrator with the Europäische Filmphilharmonie, Hoffmann has arranged music for concerts featuring scores from The Lord of the Rings, Love Story, Halloween, and more. He arranged Hans Zimmer’s “Time” from Inception for a live concert at the Zurich Film Festival, performed by Zimmer himself.

He has worked with orchestras such as the London Symphony Orchestra, City of Prague Philharmonic, Staatskapelle Weimar, WDR Funkhausorchester, City Light Symphony Orchestra, 21st Century Orchestra, Bratislava Symphony Orchestra, Sinfonieorchester Basel, Rundfunk-Sinfonieorchester Berlin and Brandenburgisches Staatsorchester Frankfurt.

=== Teaching and education ===
Hoffmann has been teaching orchestration, composition, and music theory to students internationally. He was a tutor for the online course Cinematic Orchestration by ThinkSpace Education and shares educational content through his Patreon channel.

== Awards and recognition ==
- Best Score – A Father’s Job, Hollywood Gold Awards (2020)
- Best Score – A Father’s Job, Long Story Shorts Int'l Film Festival (2020)
- Best Score – Treasure Trackers, LA Film Awards (2024)
- Best Original Score – Treasure Trackers, Global Film Festival Awards (2024)
- Best Score – Treasure Trackers, Hollywood Movie Awards (2025)
- Silver Medal for Score – Treasure Trackers, Global Music Awards (2025)
- 4× Goldene ImScheinwerfer Awards – Dällebach Kari (2009)
- 2× Prix Walo Awards – Dällebach Kari (2009)
- Golden Record (Germany) – Classical 90s Dance Vol. 2–4 (with Alex Christensen)
