= Adolf Rebner =

Austrian violinist (1876–1967)

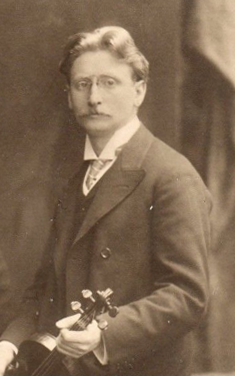
- Born: Adolf Franklin Rebner; 21 November 1876; Vienna
- Died: 19 June 1967 (aged 90); Baden-Baden
- Education: Vienna Conservatory
- Occupations: Classical violinist; Classical violist
- Organizations: Frankfurt Opera; Hoch Conservatory

Adolf Franklin Rebner (also Adolph Rebner) (21 November 1876 in Vienna – 19 June 1967 in Baden-Baden) was an Austrian violinist and violist.

Rebner was a student of Jakob Grün at the Vienna Conservatory, graduating there with first prize in 1891. Having continued his studies in Paris with Martin Pierre Marsick he settled in Frankfurt in 1896 where he was concertmaster at the Frankfurt Opera. He succeeded Hugo Heermann as professor of violin at the Hoch Conservatory and became famous as leader of his string quartet, which toured Germany, France, Spain and England. In 1934 he was forced to leave Germany (he was released from the Hoch Conservatory in 1933 because he was Jewish) and moved to Vienna. His son Edward Wolfgang Rebner (born 1910 in Frankfurt, died 1993, Munich) was an accomplished pianist and accompanist, who settled in the US in 1939.

== Ensembles ==
- Museums-Quartett (also known as Heermann Quartett and Frankfurter Quartett): Hugo Heermann, Hugo Becker, Fritz Bassermann and Adolf Rebner.
- Frankfurter Trio: Adolf Rebner, James Kwast and Johannes Hegar (from 1902 with Carl Friedberg).
- Rebner-Quartett: Adolf Rebner, Johannes Hegar, Walther Davisson and Ludwig Natterer (from 1916 with Paul Hindemith as second violinist, later violist).
