= Bernhard Sekles =

German composer and conductor

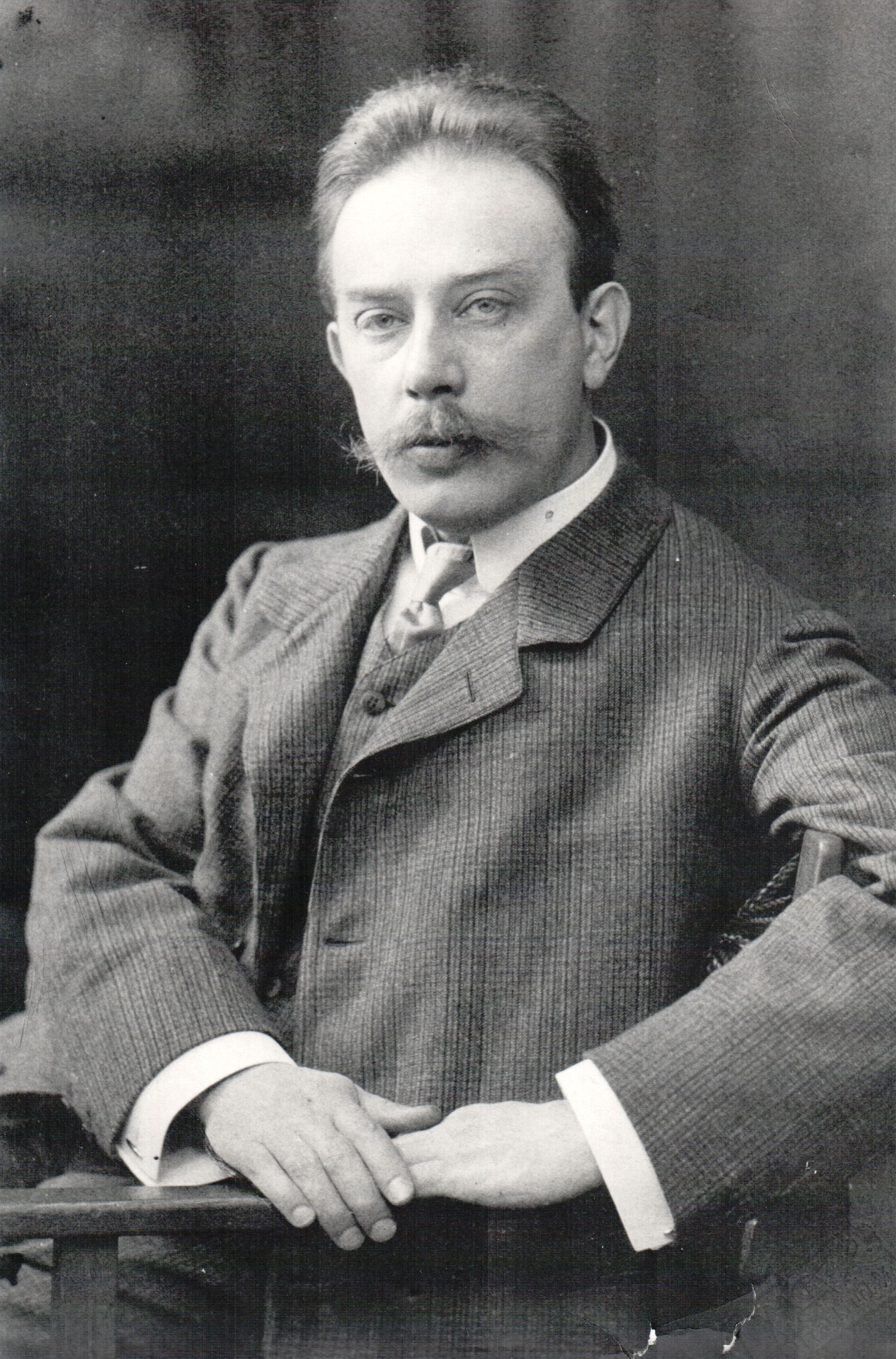
Bernhard Sekles, c. 1913

Bernhard Sekles (20 June 1872 – 8 December 1934) was a German composer, conductor, pianist and pedagogue.

== Life and career ==
Bernhard Sekles was born in Frankfurt am Main, the son of Maximilian Seckeles and Anna (née Bischheim). The family name Seckeles was changed by Bernhard Sekles to Sekles. From 1894 to 1895 he was the third Kapellmeister at the Stadttheater in Mainz. In 1896 he became a teacher at the Hoch'sche Konservatorium in Frankfurt am Main; here he started the first jazz class anywhere in 1928. He was the director of the Hoch'sche Konservatorium from 1924 to 1933. For his composition students, See: List of music students by teacher: R to S#Bernhard Sekles. He was one of the first German Jewish academics to lose his job when Hitler came to power in Germany. He died in his native Frankfurt am Main.

== Selected compositions ==
Publishers: Schott, Eulenberg, Leukart, Brockhaus, Oehler, Rather.

=== Stage works ===
- Der Zwerg und die Infantin, (The Birthday of the Infanta), ballet, op. 22, 1913, based on an Oscar Wilde fairy tale
- Scheherazade, opera, op. 26, 1917
- Die Hochzeit des Faun, comic opera, 1921
- Die zehn Küsse, comic opera, 1926

=== Orchestra ===
- Aus den Gärten der Semiramis, symphonic poem, op. 19
- Kleine Suite, dem Andenken E. T. A. Hoffmanns, op. 21
- Die Temperamente, 4 symphonic movements for large orchestra, op. 25, 1916
- Passacaglia und Fuge for large orchestra and organ, op. 17, 1922
- Gesichte, miniatures for small orchestra, op. 29, 1923
- Der Dybuk, prelude for orchestra, op. 35, 1928
- Symphony N° 1, op. 37, 1930

=== Chamber music ===
- Trio for clarinet, violoncello and piano, op. 9
- Skizzen for piano, op. 10
- Serenade for 11 solo instruments, op. 14, 1907
- Divertimento for string quartet, op. 20, 1911
- Passacaglia und Fuge im vierfachen Kontrapunkt for string quartet, op. 23, 1914
- Sonate in d-moll for violoncello and piano, op. 28, 1919
- String Quartet, op. 31, 1923
- Suite Nr. 1 for piano, op. 34
- Der Musik-Baukasten for piano (3 or 4 hands), 1930
- Chaconne über ein achttaktiges Marschthema (Chaconne on an Eight-Beat March Theme) for viola and piano, op. 38, 1931
- Sonata for violin and piano, op. 44

=== Vocal music ===
- "Lieder", op. 6
- Volkspoesien aus dem Rumänischen, for baritone and piano, op. 7, 1900
- Aus >Hafis<, 4 songs for baritone and piano, op.11, 1902
- Aus dem Schi-King (Friedrich Rückert), 18 Lieder for high voice and piano, op. 15, 1907
- 4 Lieder auf Gedichte von Friedrich Rückert for baritone and piano, op. 18, 1911
- 4 Lieder for female choir and piano, op. 6, 1899
- 6 volkstümliche Gesänge for soprano, male choir and piano, op. 12, 1904
- Variationen über >Prinz Eugen< for male choir, wind and percussion instruments, op. 32, 1926
- Vater Noah for male choir, op. 36
- Psalm 137 for mixed choir, soprano and organ, 1933/1934 (Edited by Edmund Brownless - Laurentius-Musikverlag)

=== Theoretical publications ===
- Musikdiktat, dictation exercises, Mainz 1901
- Instrumentations-Beispiele, examples of instrumentation, Mainz 1912
- Musikalische Geduldspiele – Elementarschule der Improvisation, Mainz 1931
- Grundzüge der Formenlehre (rules of harmony)
- Harmonielehre (manual of harmony)

== See also ==
- Timeline of jazz education
- Jazz in Germany

== Literature ==
- Articles in Die Musik in Geschichte und Gegenwart (Kassel 2006) and New Grove (London 2001)
- Peter Cahn: Das Hoch'sche Konservatorium 1878-1978, Frankfurt am Main: Kramer, 1979, pages 257–270, 295–297.
- Joachim Tschiedel: "Der 'jüdische Scheindirektor' Bernhard Sekles und die Gründung der ersten europäischen Jazz-Klasse 1928", in: mr-Mitteilungen Nr. 20 - September 1996
- Joachim Tschiedel: Bernhard Sekles 1872–1934. Leben und Werk des Frankfurter Komponisten und Pädagogen, Schneverdingen 2005
- Theodor W. Adorno: "Bernhard Sekles zum 50. Geburtstag", in Gesammelte Schriften Band 18, Frankfurt/Main 1984, S. 269 f.
- Theodor W. Adorno: Minima Moralia, Frankfurt/M. 1951, page 291 ff.
- Baker's Biographical Dictionary of Musicians, (Nicolas Slonimsky, Editor) New York: G. Schirmer, 1958

== Selected discography ==
- Chamber Music: Rhapsody, Sonata op. 44, Sonata op. 28, Capriccio; Zuk Records 334, 2011.
