= Gertrude Clarke Whittall =

American philanthropist (1867–1965)

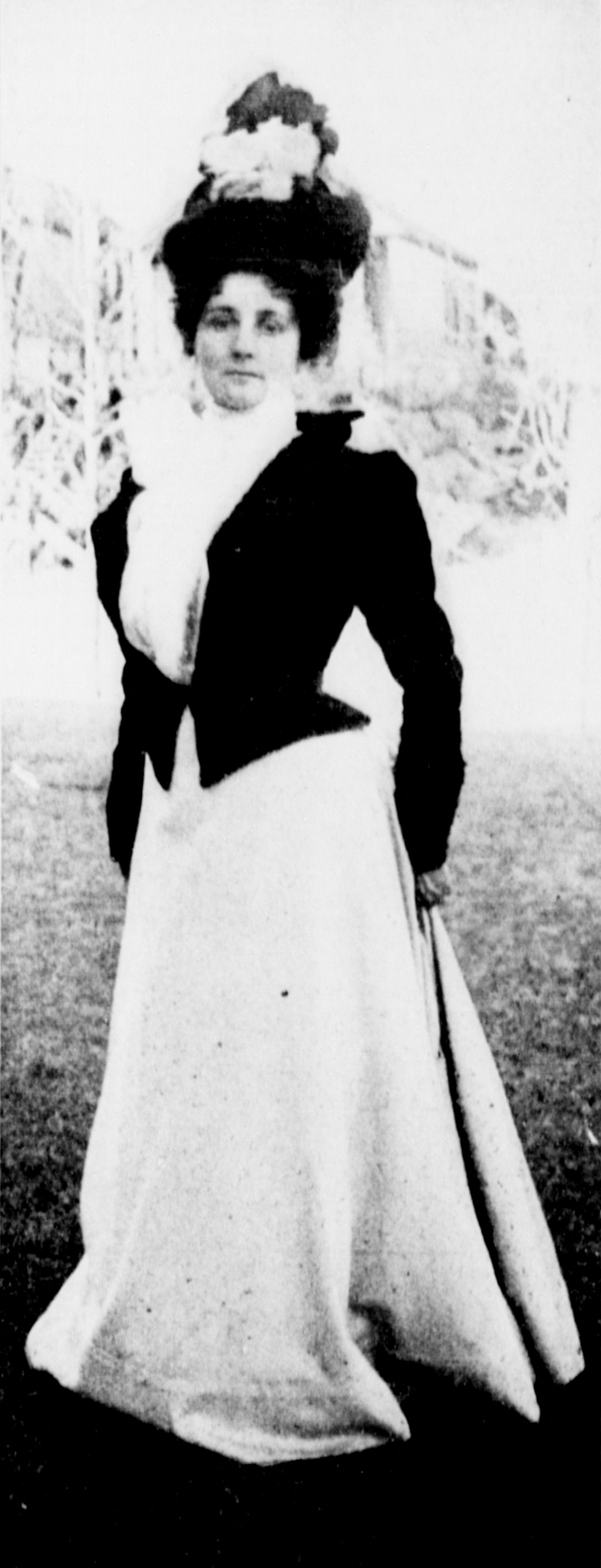
- Gertrude Clarke Whittall in 1900
- Born: October 7, 1867; Bellevue
- Died: June 29, 1965 (aged 97); Washington, D.C.
- Parent(s): Henry T. Clarke Sr.
- Relatives: Maurice Gordon Clarke, Henry Clarke

Gertrude Clarke Whittall (October 7, 1867 – June 29, 1965) was an American philanthropist. She donated five musical instruments built by Antonio Stradivari to the Library of Congress, and the Library's Whittall Pavilion is named for her.

== Early life and education ==
Gertrude Clarke Whittall was born Gertrude Littlefield Clarke on October 7, 1867 in Bellevue, Nebraska. She was one of seven children and the only daughter of Henry Tefft Clarke, Sr., a Nebraska businessman and politician, and his wife Martha Fielding Clark. She grew up on her parents' Nebraska farm surrounded by her brothers, then at the age of 12, she was sent to a girls' boarding school. When she was older, she studied at the Sorbonne, learned Spanish and French, and travelled extensively. On June 4, 1906, she married a British-born Massachusetts carpet manufacturer, Matthew John Whittall. Initially they lived at his home Whittall Manor in Worcester, Massachusetts. In 1912, they bought property in Shrewsbury, Massachusetts, where they built a sprawling mansion and estate they called Juniper Hill.

Matthew Whittall died in 1922. Gertrude Whittall donated Juniper Hill to the Masonic Grand Lodge of Massachusetts for use as a hospital. In 1976, Shrewsbury bought the hospital and grounds, demolished the building, and created Prospect Park.

After living in Boston for a time, in 1934, Whittall moved to Washington, D.C., where she spent the rest of her life, living in the Shoreham Hotel, then the Sheraton-Park Hotel.

== Philanthropy ==
Whittall's lifelong devotion to chamber music began with a performance by the Flonzaley Quartet at Whittall Manor in 1908. In Washington, D.C., she was known for the musical soirées she hosted.

Encouraged by Librarian of Congress Herbert Putnam, Whittall donated four Stradivari instruments to the Library of Congress in 1935, and a fifth in 1937. They were three violins, one viola, and one violoncello:

- 1697 “Castelbarco” violoncello
- 1699 “Castelbarco” violin
- 1700 “Ward" violin
- 1704 “Betts" violin
- 1727 “Cassavetti” viola

Each instrument was accompanied by a bow created by François Tourte. She also donated a large collection of manuscripts and correspondence by numerous composers, including Brahms and Mendlelssohn. She funded a foundation to support her donations and public concerts, as well as the construction of the Library's Whittall Pavilion. She stipulated that the instruments were not to leave the Library, so the Library engaged a resident string quartet, initially the Budapest String Quartet in 1940, then the Juilliard String Quartet in 1962. In 2003, the Library ended the resident quartet in favor of having numerous visiting musicians perform using the instruments.

In 1950, she created the Gertrude Clarke Whittall Poetry and Literature Fund to support readings, lectures, and other events at the Library. Through her philanthropy she became friends with poet Robert Frost. She later said that they had made a pact: "We both enjoyed so much what we are doing here that we couldn't imagine the next world's being any better, so we agreed that if we didn't like the hereafter, we'd just come back."

== Death ==
Gertrude Clarke Whittall died on June 29, 1965, in Washington, D.C.
