= Katims =

Katims is a surname. Notable people with the surname include:

- Jason Katims (born 1960), American television writer, producer, and playwright
- Milton Katims (1909–2006), American violist and conductor
