= Betts Stradivarius =

1704 Cremonese violin

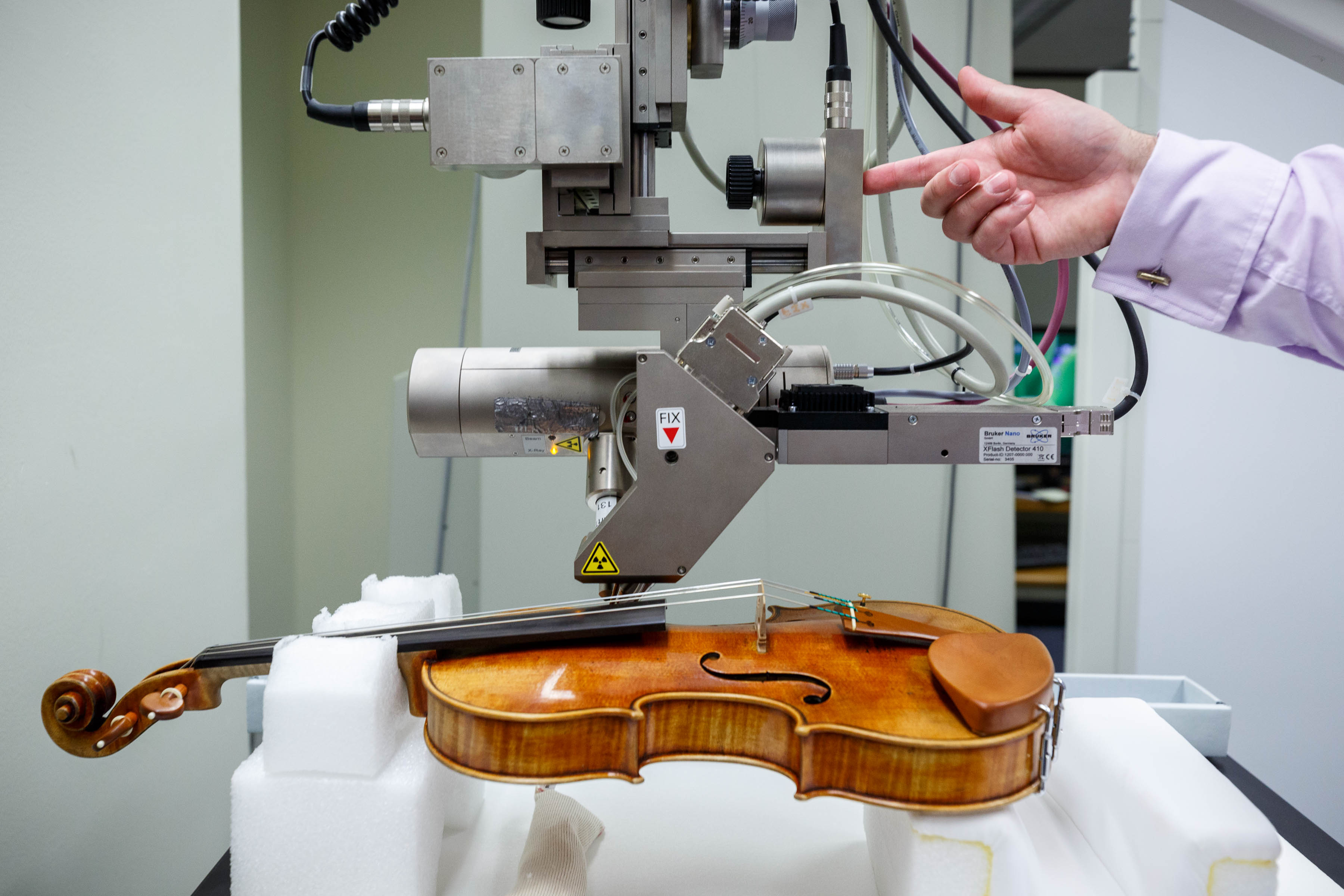
The Oberlin Betts violin, a replica of the Betts Stradivarius

The Betts Stradivarius is a violin made in 1704 by the Italian luthier Antonio Stradivari of Cremona. It is one of around 650 known extant Stradivari instruments.

It has been owned by the French violin maker Jean-Baptiste Vuillaume and London instrument dealers W.E. Hill & Sons. The instrument is currently in the collection of the Library of Congress in Washington, D.C., among the four other Stradivaris in the Cremonese Collection donated by Gertrude Clarke Whittall in 1935.
