= Henry T. Clarke Sr. =

American politician

Henry Tefft Clarke Sr. (April 26, 1834 – February 3, 1913) was an American businessman, pioneer, and politician from Nebraska.

Born in Greenwich, New York, he was educated in the local schools. He moved to Cleveland, Ohio and eventually to Nebraska Territory, where he built railroads and bridges. Eventually, he opened a retail drug company and helped platted Bellevue, Nebraska. In 1862, he served in the Nebraska Territorial House of Representatives and in 1864, he was elected to the Nebraska Territorial Council. He also served on the Omaha, Nebraska Board of Education also during this time. His children include lawyer Henry Clarke, football coach and oil businessman Maurice Gordon Clarke, and philanthropist Gertrude Clarke Whittall. He died in Excelsior Springs, Missouri.
