= Edgar Ortenberg =

Ukrainian violinist (1900–1996)

Eleazar Ortenberg
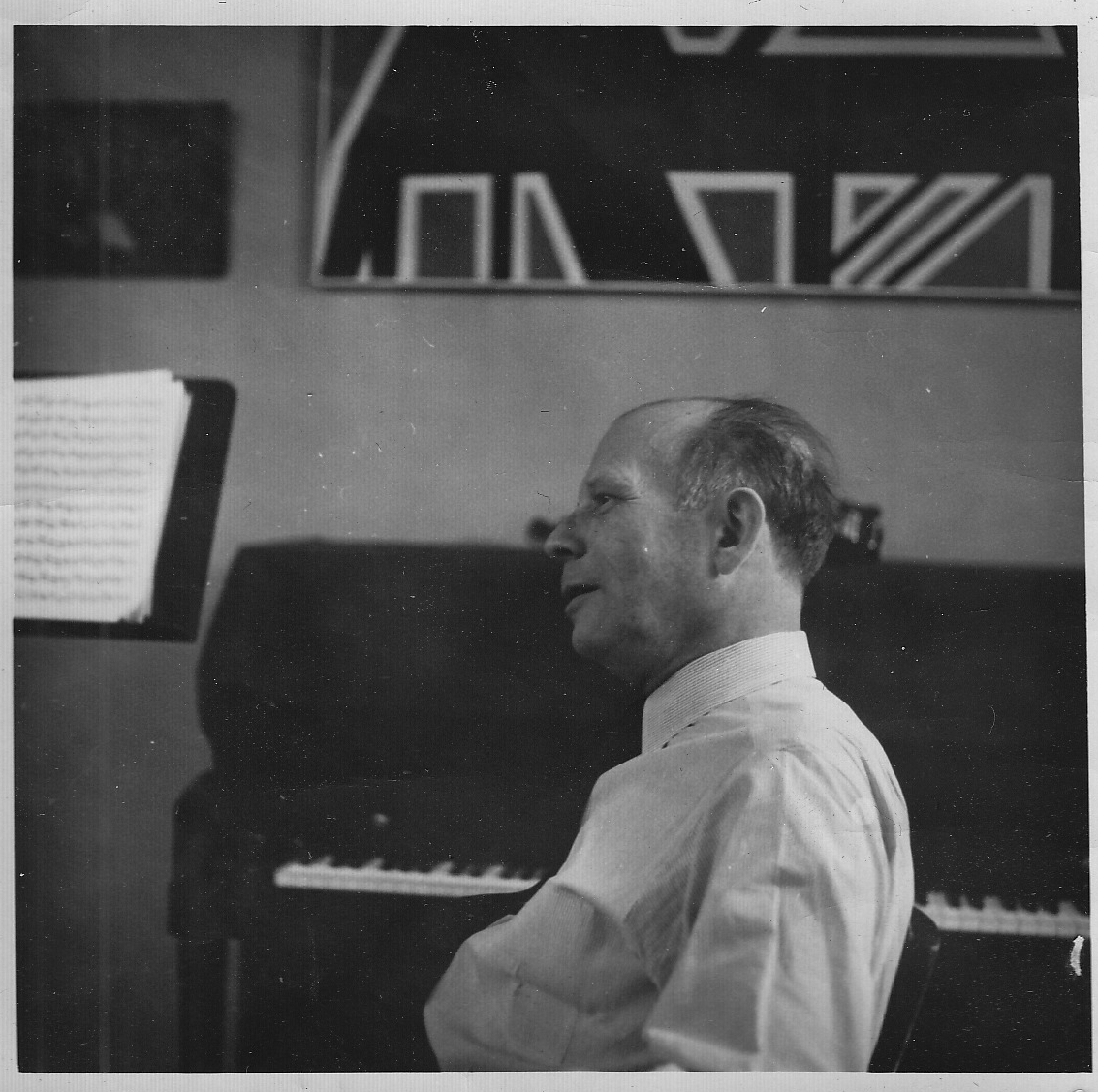
- Born: June 17, 1900; Odessa, Ukraine
- Died: May 16, 1996 (aged 95)
- Occupation: Classical violinist
- Spouse: Tamara Ortenberg (m. 1929)
- Children: 0

Edgar Ortenberg (born Eleazar Ortenberg, June 17, 1900 – May 16, 1996) was a violinist in the Budapest String Quartet and taught violin at the Settlement Music School and Temple University in Philadelphia, Pennsylvania.

Born Eleazar Ortenberg in Odessa, his teachers included Naoum Blinder at the Odessa Conservatory and Jacques Thibaud in Paris. He was 15 years old when he began attending the Odessa Conservatory, and at 21 became the concertmaster of the Odessa Opera Orchestra. He left Russia in 1924 because of anti-Semitism after the Russian Revolution. In 1927 he adopted the first name "Edgar" (which was less Hebraic) and formed the Berlin String Quartet with the official approval of the city's mayor. The quartet was reformulated in 1933 by the Nazi government. In 1929, while in Berlin, he met and married his wife, Tamara, also a Russian emigrant. They had no children, but at his death the couple had a number of nieces and nephews living both in the US and in Ukraine.

In 1933 he and his wife moved to Paris, where he formed the Quotour Ortembert, which toured the United States in 1937, the first French string quartet to ever do so. He also acquired French nationality by naturalization on 22 July 1938, was drafted into the French army in 1939, but while recovering from sickness in 1941, he and his wife escaped Nazi-controlled France for Portugal and then moved to New York in 1941. There he played for the WQXR Radio Orchestra. His French nationality was withdrawn on 22 December 1941 by Philippe Petain. He was invited to join the Budapest String Quartet in 1936 but declined, they asked him to be a violist and his wife did not want him to switch instruments, noting that "I want to be the widow of a violinist, not the widow of a violist". He accepted a second invitation in 1944 and performed with the group until 1949. He then moved to Philadelphia, where he taught violin at the Settlement Music School until 1985 and served on the faculty at Temple University from 1951 to 1972. He died on May 16, 1996, of cancer at age 95.
