= Budapest String Quartet =

String quartet

- String quartet
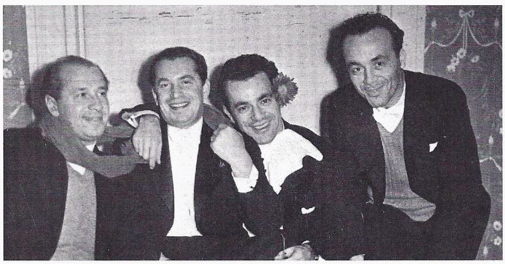
- The quartet in 1938: (left to right) Josef Roisman (violin), Boris Kroyt (viola), Alexander Schneider (violin), Mischa Schneider (cello)
- Founded: 1917
- Disbanded: 1967

The Budapest String Quartet was a string quartet in existence from 1917 to 1967. It originally consisted of three Hungarians and a Dutchman; at the end, the quartet consisted of four Russians. A number of recordings were made for His Master's Voice and RCA Victor through 1938; from 1940 through 1967 it recorded for Columbia Records. Additionally, several of the Quartet's live performances were recorded, at the Library of Congress and other venues.

== Members ==
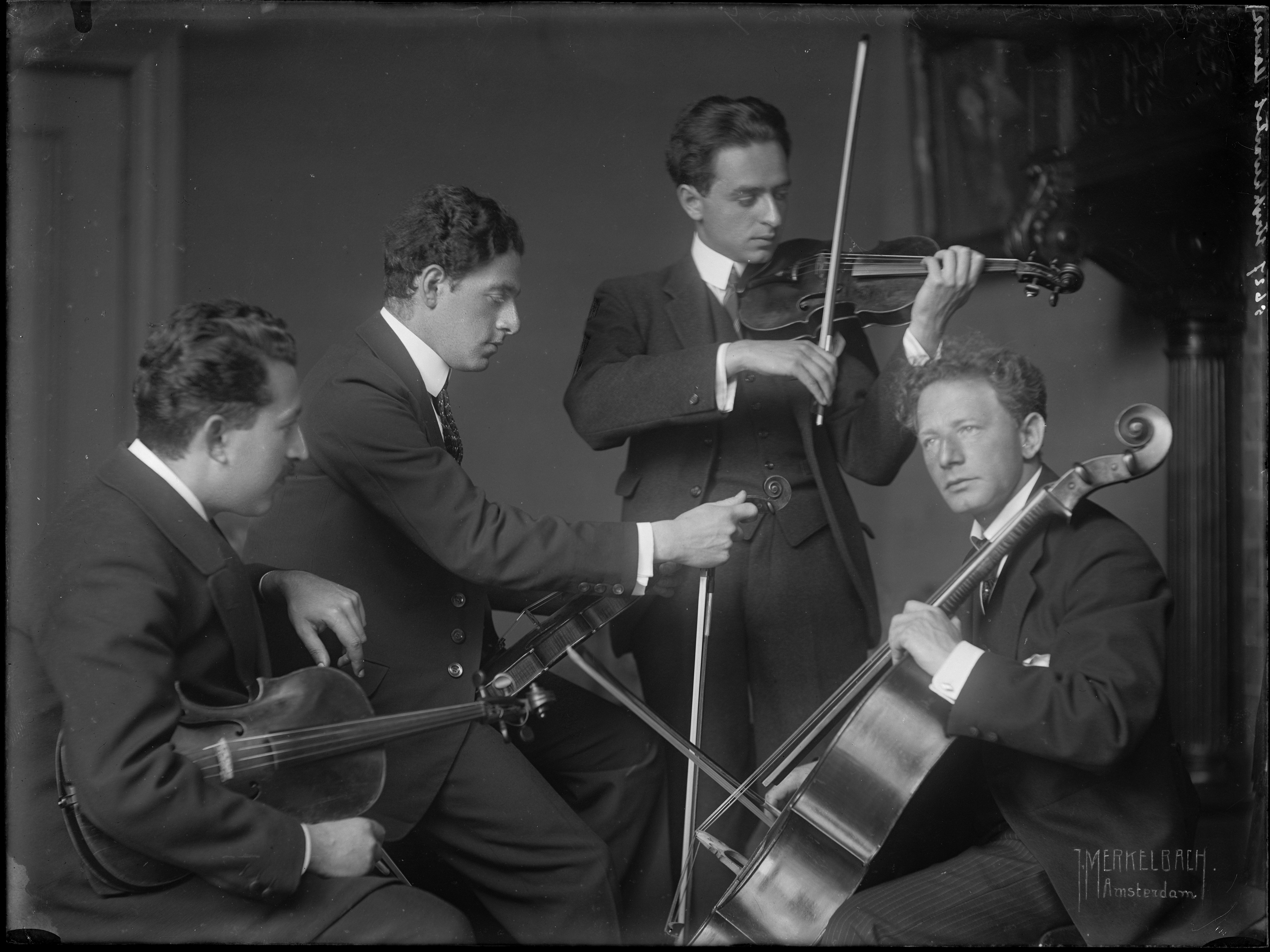
Budapest String Quartet (1919)

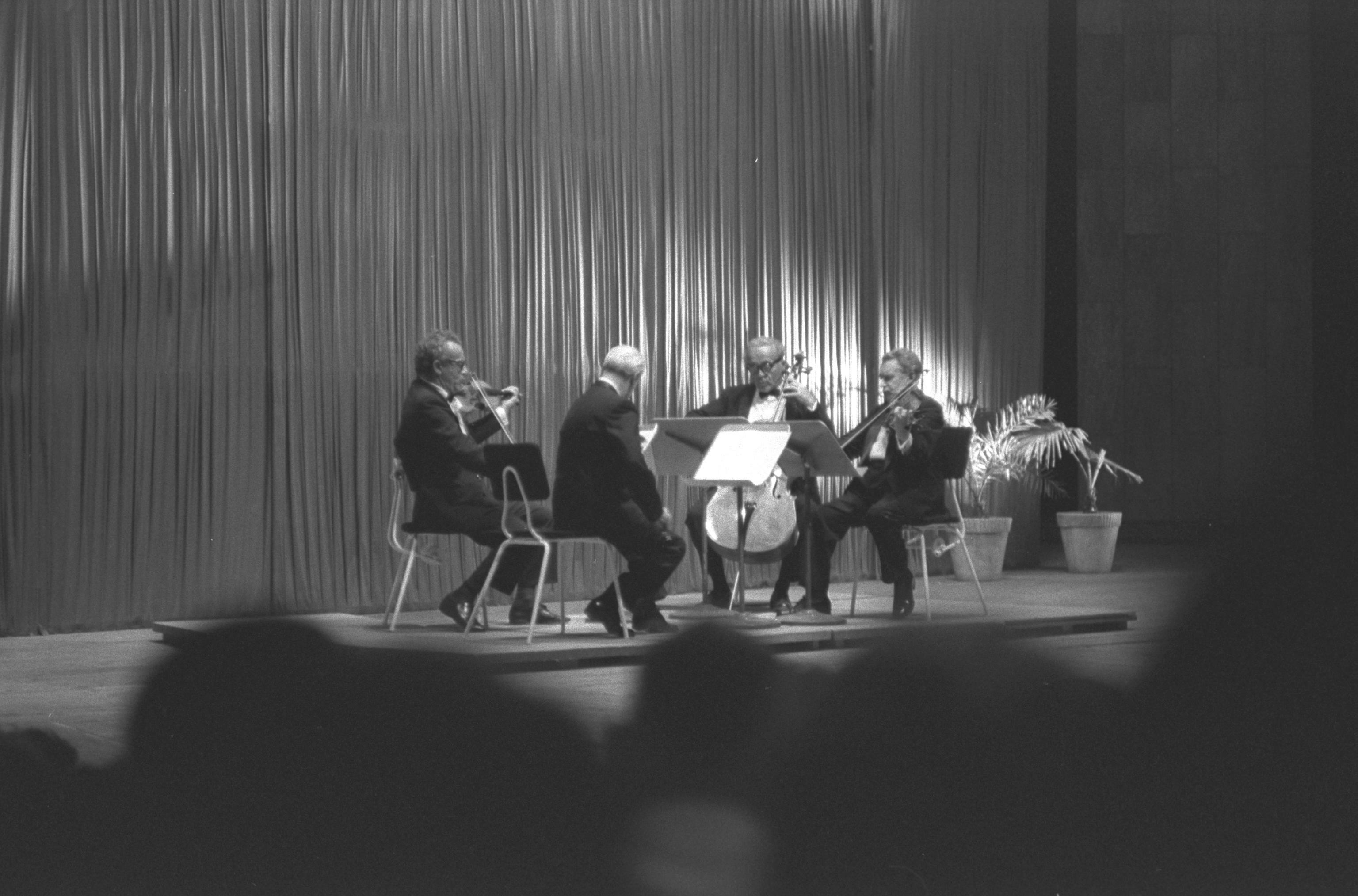
Budapest String Quartet at Fredric R. Mann Auditorium, Tel Aviv, 1961

1st violin:

- Emil Hauser (1893–1978) (from 1917 to 1932)
- Josef Roisman (Joe) (1900–1974) (from 1932 to 1967)

2nd violin:

- Alfred Indig (1892–?) (from 1917 to 1920)
- Imre Pogany (1893–1975) (from 1920 to 1927)
- Josef Roisman (Joe) (1900–1974) (from 1927 to 1932)
- Alexander Schneider (Sasha) (1908–1993) (from 1932 to 1944 and from 1955 to 1967)
- Edgar Ortenberg (1900–1996) (from 1944 to 1949)
- Jac Gorodetzky (1913–1955) (from 1949 to 1955)

Viola:

- István Ipolyi (1886–1955) (from 1917 to 1936)
- Boris Kroyt (1897–1969) (from 1936 to 1967)

Cello:

- Harry Son (born Henri Mozes Son) (1880–1942) (from 1917 to 1930)
- Mischa Schneider (1904–1985) (from 1930 to 1967)

== History of the quartet ==
=== Foundation ===
The Budapest String Quartet was formed in 1917 by four friends, all members of opera orchestras that had ceased playing after World War I broke out. The members were all protégés of Jenő Hubay (violin), a Hungarian pupil of Joseph Joachim and David Popper (cello), a Bohemian. Hubay and Popper had helped to make Budapest a major center for musical education, attracting famous students such as Joseph Szigeti. Hubay and Popper had supported Sándor Végh and Feri Roth in the formation of two other quartets bearing their respective names, and were themselves part of an earlier Budapest Quartet, the new quartet being named in its honor. The debut recital of the new Budapest String Quartet (in Hungarian: Budapesti Vonósnégyes), took place in December 1917 in Kolozsvár, then in Hungary, now called Cluj-Napoca in present-day Romania.

The quartet was established with the following rules:

1. All disputes, musical or business, were to be resolved by a vote. In case of a tie, no change.
2. Players were not allowed to take engagements outside the quartet.
3. Players were paid equally, with nothing extra for the leader (first violin).
4. No wives or girlfriends were permitted at rehearsals or discussions.

No previous quartet had attempted to live entirely on the proceeds of its concerts. It was a brave decision for that time. Much later, in July 1930, the current members added another rule to resolve tied votes: One player, chosen by lot, would have a deciding vote. His initials would be written on the music, and he would always have the extra vote for that piece. If he was replaced, his successor would inherit his voting rights.

The original members were Emil Hauser, aged 24, from Budapest; Alfred Indig, 25, from Hungary; István Ipolyi, 31, from Újvidék in Hungary; and Harry Son from Rotterdam, in the Netherlands.

In 1920, Indig resigned in the hope of advancement; he was replaced by Imre Pogany, a native of Budapest who had studied under Hubay and Zoltán Kodály. After resigning, Indig became a soloist with the Amsterdam Concertgebouw Orchestra; and 1931 he became concertmaster of the Berlin Philharmonic. When the Nazis came to power, Indig fled to Paris where he led another quartet for a while. He then relocated to Amsterdam until 1951, and thereafter returned to Paris. His date and place of death remain unknown.

=== Move to Berlin ===
In 1921 or 1922, owing to political unrest in Budapest, the quartet moved to Berlin where the group developed a large repertoire but received only mixed reviews. In 1925 the quartet debuted in London and signed a recording contract with His Master's Voice, making recordings at His Master's Voice Studio B at Hayes and the Queen's Small Hall .

In May 1927, without telling the others, Pogany traveled to Cincinnati to see his friend conductor Fritz Reiner about a job in the symphony orchestra there. He was offered the post of principal second violin, but refused it at that time. The other members of the quartet were furious because if he had left, they would have found it very difficult to find and rehearse a replacement player in time for the new season. In the ensuing row, Pogany resigned. He then emigrated to America, and this time decided to join the Cincinnati Symphony and teach at the local conservatory. In 1929, he moved on to the New York Philharmonic Orchestra under Arturo Toscanini as principal second violin, remaining there until his retirement in 1958.

=== Josef Roisman – second violin ===
The man recommended to replace Pogany was Josef Roisman, familiarly known as Joe. Roisman was born on 25 July 1900 in Odessa, and was started on the violin at the age of six with Pyotr Stolyarsky, who was also the first teacher of David Oistrakh and Nathan Milstein. After the tragic early death of Joe's father, a wealthy Odessa woman made it possible for him, his sister and mother to relocate to Berlin so that he could study with Alexander Fiedemann. There he befriended Boris Kroyt, another Odessan studying with Fiedemann. At the outbreak of World War I, the family returned to Odessa where Joe continued his studies with Naoam Blinder, another Odessan, who had just returned from England.

After the Russian revolution, Roisman was co-opted to play at farms and factories. He managed to escape in 1923 while working near Poland. He traveled to Prague, then to Berlin. In Berlin he met with Kroyt again, who found work for him in a film orchestra. It was during this time that the quartet offer came. Joe was comfortable and secure in the orchestra, but his first love was chamber music. In the end, his wife Polo persuaded him to take the financial risk and sacrifice involved.

Immediately he began to regret it. Hauser and Son were constantly in dispute and soliciting his vote. Moreover, Roisman had his own issues, in particular involving Hauser and Ipolyi's inability to play in spiccato (German Springbogen, or with "bouncing" bow), so that the quartet was forced not to use it. The rest of the quartet had had to become expert in using another bowing technique (German Spitzen, or staccato at the point, or tip, of the bow) to get around Hauser and Ipolyi's lack of spiccato technique. Roisman found it very hard to readjust his bowing style accordingly. He had to spend many hours practicing, and was unhappy with the result. In Germany, the quartet was called das Spitzenquartett (not a compliment) because it substituted Spitzen (staccato) for Springbogen (spiccato).

=== Harry Son – cellist ===
Finally, in 1930/31, Son could stand the persistent arguments no longer and resigned. He emigrated to Palestine, and played in concerts there and abroad. Shortly before World War II, however, he made the unfortunate decision to return to Rotterdam. After the Germans invaded the Netherlands, he and his wife Marianne were arrested in Amsterdam, and died in 1942 in the notorious Auschwitz-Monowitz concentration camp.

=== Mischa Schneider – cellist ===
The new cellist was originally named Mojzesz Sznejder, later Germanized as 'Mischa Schneider'. Born in 1904 in Vilna, Russia (though some place it in Poland at that time) (now Vilnius, Lithuania), where celebrated violin virtuoso Jascha Heifetz was born in 1901, he had a difficult upbringing. The family had little money, and his father was a tyrant. Mischa often found himself defending his younger brother Sasha against their father. In 1920, at the age of 16, Mischa left home to study in Leipzig under Julius Klengel, his teacher's eminent teacher. Fellow students included Emanuel Feuermann, Gregor Piatigorsky and Jascha's cousin Benar Heifetz. After graduating he moved to Frankfurt, where he taught at the Hoch Conservatory. He found that he suffered from stage fright when playing solo, a problem that did not exist when playing in a quartet. He joined the Prisca Quartet, but resigned after a while due to a personality clash with two of the other members. The Prisca had often played in Cologne and there he got to know the Reifenbergs, whose daughter Eva had married Emanuel Feuermann. It was Frau Reifenberg who introduced Schneider to the Budapest Quartet.

=== American debut ===
In January and February 1931, the quartet made its first United States tour. Reviews were fairly good, but financially the tour was unrewarding. Arguments about Spitzen vs. Springbogen bowing and other matters persisted, and relations became difficult. Then in 1932, Hauser wanted to play some concerts with Alice Ehlers. The quartet refused to allow this deviation from the rules; there was an argument and he resigned. He emigrated to Jerusalem, formed a quartet and founded the Palestine Music Conservatory. He helped eminent Polish-Jewish concert violinist Bronisław Huberman rescue many Jews from Austria, Czechoslovakia and Germany, and was instrumental in founding the Palestine Symphony Orchestra. In 1940 he moved to the U.S., teaching first at Bard College in upper New York State, and later at the Juilliard School of Music. Hauser returned to Israel in 1960, where he died in 1978 at the age of 84.

=== Roisman becomes the leader and Alexander Schneider the second violinist ===
Having lost Hauser, the quartet needed a new leader. Introducing an unknown player as first violin is a risky step for a quartet. Owing to the established relationships and 'comfort level', a transition from second violin to first is safer. For this reason, Roisman was persuaded to make the switch from second to first.

The new second was Mischa Schneider's younger brother Alexander (Sasha), born Abram Sznejder. At 13, he almost died of tetanus after an accidental knee injury. The tetanus distorted his joints, and recovery was long and painful. Sasha left Vilna in 1924 and joined his brother in Frankfurt, securing a scholarship to study violin with Adolf Rebner, the principal violin pedagogue at the Hoch Conservatory. In 1927, Alexander became leader (concertmaster) of an orchestra in Saarbrücken; and in 1929, leader of the Norddeutscher Rundfunk Orchestra in Hamburg until 1932, when he was fired as a consequence of the ongoing Nazi campaign against Jews. It was time for him to leave Germany, and the Budapest vacancy happened at just the right moment.

After Sasha's arrival, the Quartet's level of performance improved immediately and the group began attracting larger audiences. Successful tours of the U.S., Dutch East Indies, Australia and New Zealand ensued; and in exchange for relocating to Australia, the Australian Broadcasting Corporation guaranteed the quartet six months of work a year. Still, personal relations within the Quartet were poor. Sasha was often outvoted; he hated this, but Ipolyi was usually able to pacify him. Ipolyi himself had personal problems, Mischa had divorced his wife and remarried, and the group was still not profitable.

By 1934, Jews had been expelled from all German orchestras but the Quartet, as 'Hungarian' visitors, had been spared until one night, when they received threats from a Nazi group. They switched headquarters from Berlin to Paris overnight, never to return to Germany. They toured Europe and the U.S., but always lived in inexpensive hotels and ate cheaply.

=== Last founding member leaves ===
Ipolyi became an isolated member of the quartet, the only Hungarian among three Russians. He was also the only Spitzen player left, old-fashioned in style and on the verge of a nervous breakdown as well. In 1936, the others persuaded him to resign. He settled in Norway, and during the German occupation was arrested but freed thanks to the intervention of Count Bernadotte, head of the International Red Cross. He fled to Sweden, but returned to Norway after the war. He became a Norwegian citizen, coached a quartet in Bergen and became a professor. Mischa Schneider made sure that Ipolyi received the royalties due him until the latter's death in 1955.

=== Boris Kroyt becomes violist ===
Finding a new violist to replace Ipolyi was urgent. The Australian Broadcast Corporation had engaged the Quartet for a twenty-week tour to start in May 1937 with four performances a week and the option of another ten weeks in New Zealand. They needed the money despite regular engagements in Europe and America. Roisman nearly hired Edgar Ortenberg, whom he had known when they were both children in Odessa and then again in Berlin in 1926, but Ortenberg's wife wanted him to stick to the violin. Roisman then tried to locate his teenage friend Boris Kroyt in Berlin. Until the Nazis became all-powerful Kroyt had lived well, but the Nazis stopped all Jews from working except in Jewish groups. He had a wife and a child to support, and they were all in danger. The Budapest offer came at the ideal moment. He was such a natural player that he could get away without practicing very much. They took time to get used to one another, but eventually attained a very high technical standard.

In November 1936, they reached New York and critics were impressed as never before, comparing them with Toscanini and Schnabel. Concerts were well attended. In spring 1937 they went on to Australia, New Zealand and Dutch East Indies with equally good results. When the time came to return to Europe, they considered settling in Australia and held a vote on it. The Spanish Civil War had closed many venues in Italy and all in Spain. The Schneiders voted for Australia, while the other two opted to move on. In accordance with their longstanding rule, a tie meant "no change" so they moved on. After playing in France and Britain, they reached New York again in March 1938.

All the U.S. concerts were negotiated by Annie Friedberg in New York. This continued throughout their time in the U.S., starting with very little money but eventually ending with excellent returns for them and her.

They had made five U.S. tours with no difficulty, but this time they were refused entry. Their Nansen passports were not good enough, apparently. They were ignominiously carted off to Ellis Island in a coal barge. It took frantic string-pulling by Friedberg – involving Mayor La Guardia – to get them out just in time for their first concert. They weren't in optimal condition for a concert and thought their performance wasn't too good, but nonetheless they got a rave review from The New York Times. This, finally, opened the door to real success in the U.S. Suddenly all the critics were praising them as never before, and audiences and bookings flooded in. Considering the Munich Agreement of 1938 when Chamberlain appeased Hitler and what soon happened in Europe, the break came just in time.

On April 25, 1938, they recorded the Mozart Clarinet Quintet with Benny Goodman for the Victor label. It sold well, although Goodman regretted not having first performed it live. He and the quartet made only three concerts together: October and November 1938 and August 1941. Each time, reviewers justifiably felt the result accurate (i.e., merely perfunctory) but uninspired as hoped for and expected.

In 1939 they again had good results in Paris, Amsterdam, Brussels, Norway and Britain but not in Spain and Italy, where fascism reigned and people were consequently more concerned with political issues. From the U.S., the group was commissioned to play five Stradivarius string instruments which needed regular use as part of the instrument collection at the Washington Library of Congress. These instruments had been purchased and donated by longtime influential contributor Gertrude Clarke Whittall. The recital hall on the grounds of the Library had been built in 1925 with funding donated by Elizabeth Sprague Coolidge, a major benefactress of chamber music and of several music festivals. At that time, the quartet felt it would keep them away from troublesome existing conditions in war-torn Europe.

=== U.S. becomes the home base ===
In the summer they were back in the U.S. for three months at Mills College in Oakland, California, where they could relax. The Pro Arte Quartet was normally in summer residence there, but this year they preferred to stay in their home territory of Belgium. They never returned, their leader Alphonse Onnou died suddenly in Milwaukee during an American tour, and the Budapest resided at Mills for the next fifteen summers. The first summer there, they learned that World War II had broken out in Europe, where their contracts had consequently been voided. The Library of Congress offer now sounded quite attractive, and they accepted it. Their concerts there continued for many years, and the Library was an extremely important venue for them.

Since 1925 they had been making recordings for His Master's Voice, first at the Beethoven Saal in Berlin, then at the Abbey Road Studio in London and from 1938 on in Camden, New Jersey for RCA Victor, the U.S. subsidiary of His Master's Voice. The His Master's Voice contract was valid until June 1940. It was not paying well, RCA had a good stock of recordings not yet published and was not keen to make any more recordings in 1939. The quartet found it difficult to persuade RCA to give them as much work as they wanted, or to pay them as their new reputation might justify. Nor was RCA eager to extend the existing contract. The quartet felt that with their increasing reputation in the U.S., it could do better signing with, and recording for, Columbia Records. Columbia was delighted to sign the group and make as many recordings as the quartet wished, since it had no existing stock. The deal was made, and kept secret as long as possible. When RCA finally learned about it they protested, "We are astonished. ... [this is] close to a definite breach of faith." They should have realized that they had no right to be the only negotiators in a deal. Over 35 years the quartet recorded 89 individual works, some of them several times. For many years it was Columbia's leading classical music seller, and so quite a loss to RCA.

Early on, however, there were difficulties. First the American Federation of Musicians, protecting American jobs, demanded that someone should pay two members to be "standbys" during recordings. The quartet and Columbia argued about which of them should pay. After this was settled, the AFM struck Columbia in a dispute over royalties that lasted until February 1945. Also, after war was declared, the U.S. Government rationed materials for making records. Even so, between 1941 and 1946, the quartet earned $60,000 from Columbia in royalties in addition to $16,000 from HMV.

=== Alexander Schneider replaced by Edgar Ortenberg ===
Sasha felt he could and needed to work outside the quartet. As second violinist, he did not get the same challenges or independence as the leader. After thinking about this a lot, he finally reached his decision and told the others on November 26, 1943. He was still only 35, having spent eleven years in the quartet, and needed to expand his range. On January 1, 1944, the quartet selected the new second, Edgar Ortenberg, the man who had nearly become the violist a decade before.

Like Joe and Boris, Edgar had grown up in Odessa. Until the Russian Revolution his father had been a bank manager, but afterwards the Ortenbergs were very short of money. In 1921 he won the gold medal at the Odessa Conservatory, and was immediately hired to teach there. In 1924 he moved to Berlin for greener pastures just as Joe, the Schneiders, and Boris had done, where he immediately got a scholarship at the Hochschule für Musik. He changed his name from Eleazer to Edgar, and started a quartet which toured Europe until 1933 when the Nazis sacked them all. He then quickly moved to Paris, where the Russian Conservatory there formed a quartet under his leadership which had some success in Europe. When war was threatened, he joined the French army but in April 1940 (just before the disastrous defeat by the invading Germans) was discharged due to illness, and he and his wife left Paris just ahead of the Germans. They went to Portugal and caught the very last Spanish ship departing for the U.S. After struggling in New York for some time, he received that second offer from the Budapest Quartet in December 1943 and this time accepted it.

Edgar was generally considered a fine replacement for Sasha except that some critics and all the players felt he should play more forcibly. On the other hand, he felt their playing was a bit rough. He also wanted to spend more time rehearsing since he needed to get used to their methods and accustomed to their large repertory. The others, especially Boris, were not so keen to rehearse. It took Edgar two years to feel fully at home, but still the others felt he should practice more on his own and he was becoming noticeably nervous. Critics still felt the quartet was wonderful, but not quite as good as before. Ortenberg was also exhausted by the constant traveling, and late in 1948 the others told him they wanted a different second violinist. As soon as it was made public, Ortenberg was swamped by other offers and last performed with the quartet on March 10, 1949, at Cornell University. He joined the Settlement Music School in Philadelphia, where he remained until his retirement in 1984. He also taught at Temple University from 1953 to 1978.

=== Jac Gorodetzky ===
The new second violinist was Jac Gorodetzky. He was born in Odessa but the family moved to London when he was only one, to avoid a pogrom. They moved to the U.S. before the war, settling in Philadelphia. He was well thought of as a student and secured good positions in orchestras and quartets. Although his playing, like Ortenberg's, was a little quiet, he was well thought of during the Budapest auditions, when in his mid-thirties.

In 1950, the quartet went to Europe for the first time after the war. They agreed not to go to Germany, especially because Schneider had lost his mother and sister in Auschwitz. This tour, together with the continual demands in the U.S., heavily stressed Gorodetzky. He developed stage fright, and sometimes pleaded for extra rehearsals of works they had already played.

Then in September 1952, they played in Japan as the first quartet to tour there after the war. The whole season was sold out in two hours. Three thousand attended their first concert. There were staff to attend to their every need, and cars to take them everywhere. One night they felt the need to get some exercise in Okayama. They were walking on a narrow road, when Joe fell into a nine-foot ditch and broke his left wrist. They had it set at the U.S. military hospital in Tokyo. On their return to the U.S., they were told the wrist had been improperly set and had to be re-broken and reset. Concerts were switched to trios and piano quartets during Roisman's recovery. After months of hard work, he rejoined the quartet in Portland, Oregon on January 12, 1953.

A second Japanese tour in 1954 was even more successful, but Jac was getting more uncomfortable. In February, he told the others he wanted to leave. They hoped to talk him out of it, but none of them realized how unwell he was. Finally, in November 1955, he committed suicide in a small hotel in Washington. The other players felt awful, and played benefit concerts for his family at the Settlement Music School. Later, Mischa left them most of his music and on his death Joe left them most of his money.

=== Alexander Schneider returns ===
Joe refused to accept another new second violinist, and fortunately they managed to persuade Sasha to return. Against their prior rule, they allowed him to spend some time working independently because they needed him and they did not want to take as many engagements as before. As soon as he returned, they all felt happier than they had for many years, their playing showed resultant rejuvenated strength and the critics were fulsome in their praise.

In the ten years away from the quartet, Sasha had been very busy. He rejected offers to lead the Pro Arte and Paganini Quartets, but toured and recorded with harpsichordist Ralph Kirkpatrick, played and recorded unaccompanied Bach, and played and recorded trios and piano quartets with prominent New York chamber players. He studied with Pablo Casals in Prades, whom he persuaded to start festivals in Prades, San Juan (Puerto Rico), Israel and Marlboro (Vermont). He started his own Schneider Quartet to record all the Haydn quartets for the Haydn Society label, although the Society ran out of money before the project was finished. He persuaded Mrs Coolidge to sponsor free outdoor concerts in Greenwich Village, and played guest second violin with the Budapesters when Ortenberg or Gorodetzky was indisposed.

=== Decline ===
As the 1960s approached, the quartet was quite happy. It was the most popular and world-famous quartet, with 55 record albums published by Columbia and two million copies sold, and was playing in many famous venues and festivals. But then Joe's intonation began to fail him at times, apparently in the aftermath of a mild heart attack at the end of 1960. Only then did he tell the others that as long ago as 1939, he had been told of a problem with high blood pressure. He had occasionally had intonation problems before, which worsened late in 1960.

In March 1962, they played their final concert in the Library of Congress in the aftermath of several problems of which Joe's intonation had been the worst. Critics, listeners and Mrs Coolidge herself had complained. They were replaced by the brilliant young Juilliard Quartet of New York. That autumn, in Europe, Joe suddenly suffered a slipped disc. He restarted playing in early 1963, however, and they returned to Australia after a 26-year absence. But Joe's energy level was declining, and they cut down the number of concerts year by year. ,

=== Marlboro College ===
In 1955, Sasha had joined the Marlboro Music School and Festival at Marlboro College in southern Vermont (see above). It was a school, a music festival and a summer retreat. Like a human whirlwind, he pushed the young players to stretch their talents. In time, he brought in the other Budapest players (see below), who helped make the place a breeding ground for a new generation of chamber musicians. The school had been founded in 1950 by incomparable chamber violinist Adolf Busch and eminent flautist Marcel Moyse, and their families. Busch died in 1952 before Sasha arrived, but his son-in-law, pianist Rudolf Serkin, was still quite active and he and Sasha became staunch friends, the latter spending the next twenty summers there.

In 1962 Sasha persuaded Mischa to come too, and the next year the whole quartet came, followed by many other experienced musicians and younger players. Some students found Sasha overly assertive and aggressively demanding, while Mischa and Boris were gentler. They were willing to try new ideas from their students, and each generation was inspired by the enthusiasm of the other.

Sasha persuaded Michael Tree, Arnold Steinhardt, John Dalley and David Soyer to form a brilliant new quartet – a daunting challenge for any player – and Boris suggested the name Guarneri. They spent a lot of time together at Marlboro, and the Guarneri Quartet may be regarded as the musical heirs of the Budapest. Sasha advised them, "Whenever you play string trios and piano quartets, make it a rule that the second violin plays it and not the first. ... If you play only second violin, you get stale for other things." He said that, after he left the Budapest, it took him three years to get back to good playing condition. The later super-virtuosic New York group, the Emerson String Quartet, took a similar view, and solved it by the two violinists, Eugene Drucker and Philip Setzer, alternating between first and second.

In later years, the Budapest played fewer concerts and saw each other only for concerts, but still to admiring capacity audiences, but no longer practiced very often either individually or together. Errors in detail were the inevitable result, but the general effect was still good. Sasha felt he wanted to share what he was still learning, but Joe wanted to stay as he was.

=== Conclusion ===
In January 1965 the group spent twelve days recording Dvořák's F major "American" Quartet and Smetana's E minor Quartet "From My Life". Joe had major intonation problems during the sessions, and Mischa had trouble with his back. A recording of the Dvořák was spliced together from multiple takes and published, but the players refused to accept a similar splice of the Smetana. Then Mischa, Boris and the Guarneri performed and recorded Tchaikovsky's D minor Sextet "Souvenir de Florence" with success. Immediately thereafter Mischa needed back surgery, which had troubled him since 1930. The operation failed, as did a second procedure. He never played again but he did teach extensively, including 25 summers at the Marlboro Music Festival, until his death on October 3, 1985, in Buffalo, New York.

In 1977, Sasha abruptly left Marlboro. He never explained why, but he and Serkin remained fast friends. In 1969, Boris died of cancer. In 1974, Joe suffered a fatal heart attack. In 1993 Sasha succumbed to heart failure, having played almost to the end.

The Budapest String Quartet had a huge influence on chamber music in the United States and internationally. When they relocated to the U.S. in the late 1930s, it was hard to attract large audiences. The concerts in Washington and New York, the radio broadcasts and the many records gradually raised audience numbers, made them famous and wealthy, and set high performance standards for later quartet and other chamber groups to follow and even improve upon.

Their many recordings were highly regarded, and in 1977 a Budapest String Quartet recording of the "Cavatina" from Beethoven's Quartet No. 13 in B flat major, Op. 130 was selected by NASA to be included on the Voyager Golden Record, a gold-plated copper record that was sent into space on the Voyager space craft. The record contained sounds and images which had been selected as examples of the diversity of life and culture on Earth.

Jascha Heifetz was once quoted as saying: "One Russian is an anarchist. Two Russians are a chess game. Three Russians are a revolution. Four Russians are the Budapest String Quartet."

== Recordings ==
The following listings begin with 1932; this is the year in which Josef Roisman became the quartet's leader as 1st Violin, replacing Emil Hauser, and Alexander Schneider joined the quartet as 2nd violin. Thus with the exception of István Ipolyi, who stayed until 1936, the quartet had nearly completed its transformation to its relatively stable line-up of four Russians, and achieved its long-lasting reputation.

Although most entries in the following lists are taken either from actual LPs and CDs and their liner notes or from trustworthy print or online sources, the lists are supplemented by a discography prepared by Sony Classical, apparently for their own use in identifying stock numbers. However this Sony discography contains a number of errors in identifying recording dates, personnel, and in some instances even compositions and composers. All information from this Sony discography as shown below that could not be verified from another source is preceded by an asterisk [*] as being possibly questionable.

Square brackets indicate the initials of the violist, or of the second violinist; e.g., [Va=II] indicates István Ipolyi as violist. Several recording dates are either unspecified or unknown. All of the earlier recordings were first issued as shellac 78 rpm records, many later reissued as vinyl LPs, and subsequently in CD format. First issue of the late recordings was directly to LP format. All recordings are monophonic unless specified as stereo.

=== Recordings for HMV/Victor, 1932 through 1938 ===
1st Violin: Josef Roisman; 2nd Violin: Alexander Schneider; Viola: István Ipolyi or Boris Kroyt; Cello: Mischa Schneider

- Bartók: Quartet No. 2 in A minor, Op. 17 (rec 25/4/1936 [*Va=II]; *LP reissue Odyssey Y4-34643).
- Beethoven: Quartet No. 2 in G major, Op. 18 No. 2 (rec 1/6/1938 [*Va=BK]; *LP reissue Odyssey Y3-35240).
- Beethoven: Quartet No. 3 in D major, Op. 18 No. 3 (rec 30/4/1935 [*Va=II]; *LP reissue Odyssey Y3-35240).
- Beethoven: Quartet No. 8 in E minor, Op. 59 'Rasumovsky' No. 2 (rec 24/4/1935 [Va=II]; *LP reissue Odyssey Y4-34643, CD reissue *Sony SBK-47665, *Portrait SBK-46545, Biddulph 80222).
- Beethoven: Quartet No. 13 in B flat major, Op. 130 (rec 10/8/1933 & 4/4/1934 (or 4/5?/1934) [Va=II]; *LP reissue Odyssey Y4-34643, CD reissue Biddulph 80222).
- Brahms: Quartet No. 2 in A minor, Op. 51 No. 2 (rec 30/4-1/5/1935 [Va=II]; CD reissue Biddulph LAB-120/1).
- Brahms: Quartet No. 3 in B flat major Op. 67 (rec 15,17,18/11/1933 (or same dates in 1932?) [Va=II]; *LP reissue Odyssey Y4-34643, CD reissue *Portrait MPK-45553, Biddulph LAB-120/1).
- Brahms: String Quintet No. 1 in F major, Op. 88, with Alfred Hobday (rec 8/2/1937 [Va=BK]; CD reissue Biddulph LAB-120/1).
- Brahms: String Quintet No. 2 in G major, Op. 111, with Hans Mahlke (rec 15,17,18/11/1932 [Va=II]; CD reissue Biddulph LAB-120/1).
- Brahms: String Sextet in G major, Op. 36, with Alfred Hobday & Anthony Pini (rec 8/2/1937 [Va=BK]; CD reissue Biddulph LAB-120/1).
- Mendelssohn: Quartet No. 1 in E flat major, Op. 12 (rec 29/4/1935 [Va=II]; *LP reissue Odyssey Y4-34643).
- Mozart: Quartet No. 19 in C major, K 465 'Dissonance' (rec 14/11/1932 [Va=II]; *LP reissue Odyssey Y3-33324, *Odyssey Y3-35240, CD reissue EMI CDH-63697).
- Mozart: Quartet No. 20 in D major, K 499 'Hoffmeister' (rec 5/4/1934 [Va=II]; *LP reissue Odyssey Y4-34643, CD reissue EMI CDH-63697).
- Mozart: Quartet No. 23 in F major, K 590 (rec 29/4/1935 [*Va=II]; *LP reissue Odyssey Y3-35240).
- Mozart: Clarinet Quintet in A major, K 581 with Benny Goodman (rec 25/4/1938 [Va=BK]; CD reissue EMI CDH-63697; Naxos Hist 8.111238).
- Schubert: Quartettsatz in C minor, D 703 (DB 2221) (rec 4/4/1934 [*Va=II]; *LP reissue Odyssey Y4-34643)

Schubert: Quartet No. 13 in A Minor, Op. 29 [D 804]. A Victor Musical Masterpiece, Red Seal Records, M 225. 11716 (83049)- 11719 (83056). Recorded in Europe. Pressed in Camden, N.J. Roismann, Schneider, Ipolyi, Schneider.

- Sibelius: Quartet in D minor, Op. 56 Voces Intimae (rec 8/8/1933 [Va=II] Sibelius Society Volume 3).
- Wolf: Italian Serenade in G major (1887) (rec 18/11/1932 [*Va=II]; *LP reissue Odyssey Y4-34643).

=== Recordings for Columbia from 1940 ===
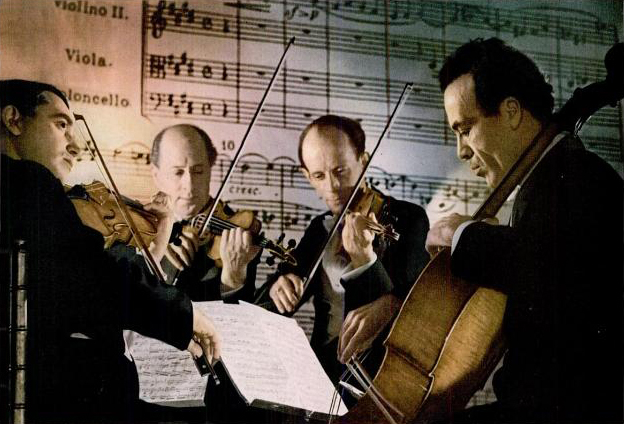
The Budapest String Quartet (1944)

1st Violin: Josef Roisman; 2nd Violin: Alexander Schneider, Edgar Ortenberg, or Jac Gorodetzky; Viola: Boris Kroyt; Cello: Mischa Schneider

- Beethoven: Quartet No. 1 in F major, Op. 18 No. 1:

- rec 9/9/1940 [2V=AS]; CD reissue Sony MH2K-62870.
- rec 5-9/5/1952 [2V=JG]; CD reissue CBS MP2K-52531, United Archives NUA01.
- stereo rec 1958 [2V=AS]; LP Col M3S-606; CD reissue Sony 88697776782.

- Beethoven: Quartet No. 2 in G major, Op. 18 No. 2:

- rec 1938: see HMV/Victor, above.
- rec 5-9/5/1952 [2V=JG]; CD reissue CBS MP2K-52531, United Archives NUA01.
- stereo rec 1958 [2V=AS]; LP Col M3S-606; CD reissue Sony 88697776782.

- Beethoven: Quartet No. 3 in D major, Op. 18 No. 3:

- rec 1935: see HMV/Victor, above.
- rec 29/11/1951 [2V=JG]; CD reissue CBS MP2K-52531, United Archives NUA01.
- stereo rec 1958 [2V=AS]; LP Col M3S-606; CD reissue Sony 88697776782.

- Beethoven: Quartet No. 4 in C minor, Op. 18 No. 4:

- rec 9-10/1/1941 [2V=AS]; CD reissue Sony MH2K-62870.
- rec 2/12/1951 [2V=JG]; CD reissue CBS MP2K-52531, United Archives NUA01.
- stereo rec 1958 [2V=AS]; LP Col M3S-606; CD reissue Sony 88697776782.

- Beethoven: Quartet No. 5 in A major, Op. 18 No. 5:

- (Minuet only): rec 15/9/1941 [2V=AS]; CD reissue Sony MH2K-62873.
- rec 2/5/1951 [2V=JG]; CD reissue CBS MP2K-52531, United Archives NUA01.
- (stereo rec 1958 [2V=AS]; LP Col M3S-606); CD reissue Sony 88697776782.

- Beethoven: Quartet No. 6 in B flat major, Op. 18 No. 6

- rec 2/4/1945 [2V=EO]; CD reissue Sony MH2K-62870.
- rec 26/11/1951 [2V=JG]; CD reissue CBS MP2K-52531, United Archives NUA01.
- stereo rec 1958 [2V=AS]; LP Col M3S-606; CD reissue Sony 88697776782.

- Beethoven: Quartet No. 7 in F major, Op. 59 'Rasumovsky' No. 1:

- rec 1930s: see HMV/Victor, above.
- rec 5-9/5/52 [2V=JG]; *LP reissue Odyssey Y3-33316; CD reissue United Archives NUA01.
- stereo rec 17-19/11/1959 [2V=AS]; CD reissue Sony SBK-46545, Sony 88697776782.

- Beethoven: Quartet No. 8 in E minor, Op. 59 'Rasumovsky' No. 2:

- rec 1935: see HMV/Victor, above.
- rec ?/5/1951 [2V=JG]; *LP reissue Odyssey Y3-33316; CD reissue United Archives NUA01.
- stereo rec 17-19/11/1959 [2V=AS]; CD reissue Sony SBK-46545, Sony 88697776782.

- Beethoven: Quartet No. 9 in C major, Op. 59 'Rasumovsky' No. 3:

- rec 15/9/1941 [2V=AS]; CD reissue Sony MH2K-62870, *Sony SBK-47665.
- rec 28/11/1951 [2V=JG]; *LP reissue Odyssey Y3-33316; CD reissue *Sony MPK-45551, United Archives NUA01.
- stereo rec 16/5/1960 [2V=AS]; CD reissue Sony SBK-47665, Sony 88697776782.

- Beethoven: Quartet No. 10 in E flat major, Op. 74 'Harp':

- *rec betw 1940-44 [*2V=AS]; CD reissue *Sony SBK-47665.
- rec ?/5/1951 [2V=JG]; *LP reissue Odyssey Y3-33316, *Odyssey Y3-35240; CD reissue *Sony MPK-45551, United Archives NUA01.
- stereo rec 17/5/1960 [2V=AS]; CD reissue Sony SBK-47665, CBS MPK-45551, Sony 88697776782.

- Beethoven: Quartet No. 11 in F minor, Op. 95 'Serioso':

- rec 5/12/1941 [2V=AS]; CD reissue Sony MH2K-62870.
- rec 2/12/1951 [2V=JG]; *LP reissue Odyssey Y3-33316; CD reissue United Archives NUA01.
- stereo rec 1960 [2V=AS]; CD reissue Sony SBK-46545, CBS MPK-45551, Sony 88697776782.

- Beethoven: Quartet No. 12 in E flat major, Op. 127:

- rec 26/2/1942 [2V=AS]; CD reissue Sony MH2K-62873.
- rec 5-9/5/1952 [2V=JG]; CD reissue United Archives NUA01.
- stereo rec 1961 [2V=AS]; LP Col M5S-677; CD reissue Sony 88697776782.

- Beethoven: Quartet No. 13 in B flat major, Op. 130:

- rec 1933-34: see HMV/Victor, above.
- rec 3/5/1951 [2V=JG]; CD reissue United Archives NUA01.
- stereo rec 1961 [2V=AS]; LP Col M5S-677; CD reissue Sony 88697776782.

- Beethoven: Quartet No. 14 in C sharp minor, Op. 131:

- rec 9/9 & 21/10/1940 [2V=AS]; CD reissue Sony MH2K-62873.
- rec 4-6/12/1951 [2V=JG]; CD reissue United Archives NUA01.
- stereo rec 1961 [2V=AS]; LP Col M5S-677; CD reissue Sony 88697776782.

- Beethoven: Quartet No. 15 in A minor, Op. 132:

- rec 13-14/4/1942 [2V=AS]; CD reissue Sony MH2K-62873.
- rec 26-28/5/1952 [2V=JG]; CD reissue United Archives NUA01.
- stereo rec 1961 [2V=AS]; LP Col M5S-677; CD reissue Sony 88697776782.

- Beethoven: Quartet No. 16 in F major, Op. 135:

- rec 9-10/9/1940 [2V=AS]; CD reissue Sony MH2K-62873.
- rec 27/11/1951 [2V=JG]; CD reissue United Archives NUA01.
- stereo rec 1960 [2V=AS]; LP Col M5S-677; CD reissue Sony 88697776782.

- Beethoven: Grosse Fuge in B flat major, Op. 133:

- rec 1920s with different personnel
- rec 7/5/1951 [2V=JG]; CD reissue United Archives NUA01.
- stereo rec 2/5/1961 [2V=AS]; CD reissue Sony SBK-47665, CBS MPK-45551, Sony 88697776782.

- Beethoven: String Quintet in C major, Op. 29, with Milton Katims: rec 23/4/1945 [2V=EO]; CD reissue Sony MH2K-62870.
- Beethoven: Quintet in E flat major for piano and winds, Op. 16 (version for piano and string trio), with Mieczysław Horszowski: LP Col MS-6473.
- Brahms: Quartet No. 1 in C minor, Op. 51 No. 1: stereo rec 1963 [2V=AS]; CD reissue CBS MPK-45686.
- Brahms: Quartet No. 2 in A minor, Op. 51 No. 2: LP Col M2S-734.
- Brahms: Quartet No. 3 in B flat major, Op. 67: stereo rec 1963 [2V=AS]; CD reissue CBS MPK-45553.
- Brahms: Piano Quartet No. 2 in A major, Op. 26, with Clifford Curzon: rec 1952 [2V=JG]; LP Col ML-4630; CD reissue Naxos Hist 8.110306.
- Brahms: Piano Quintet in F minor, Op. 34:

- with Clifford Curzon: rec 1950 [2V=JG]; LP Col ML-4336; CD reissue Naxos Hist 8.110307.
- with Rudolf Serkin: stereo rec 1963 [2V=AS]; CD reissue CBS MPK-45686.

- Brahms: Clarinet Quintet in B minor, Op. 115, with David Oppenheim: stereo rec 1959 [2V=AS]; CD reissue CBS MPK-45553.
- Debussy: Quartet in G minor, Op. 10: CD reissue CBS MPK-44843.
- Dvořák: Quartet No. 12 in F major, Op. 96 'American': stereo rec 1965 [2V=AS]; LP Col M-32792.
- Dvořák: String Quintet No. 3 in E flat major, Op. 97, with Walter Trampler: LP Col M-32792.
- Dvořák: Piano Quintet in A major, Op. 81, with Clifford Curzon: rec 1953 [2V=JG]; LP Col ML-4825; CD reissue Naxos Hist 8.110307.
- Haydn: Quartet in G major, Op. 76 No. 1: rec 1954 [2V=JG]; CD reissue United Archives UAR-003.
- Haydn: Quartet in D minor, Op. 76 No. 2 'Quinten': rec 1954 [2V=JG]; CD reissue United Archives UAR-003.
- Haydn: Quartet in C major, Op. 76 No. 3 'Emperor': rec 1954 [2V=JG]; CD reissue United Archives UAR-003.
- Haydn: Quartet in B flat major, Op. 76 No. 4 'Sunrise': rec 1954 [2V=JG]; CD reissue United Archives UAR-003.
- Haydn: Quartet in D major, Op. 76 No. 5: rec 1954 [2V=JG]; CD reissue United Archives UAR-003.
- Haydn: Quartet in E flat major, Op. 76 No. 6: rec 1954 [2V=JG]; CD reissue United Archives UAR-003.
- Mozart: Quartet No. 14 in G major, K 387: rec 1953 [2V=JG]; CD reissue Sony SM2K-47219.
- Mozart: Quartet No. 15 in D minor, K 421: rec 1953 [2V=JG]; CD reissue Sony SM2K-47219.
- Mozart: Quartet No. 16 in E flat major, K 428: rec 1950 [2V=JG]; CD reissue Sony SM2K-47219.
- Mozart: Quartet No. 17 in B flat major, K 458 'Hunting': rec 1953 [2V=JG]; CD reissue Sony SM2K-47219.
- Mozart: Quartet No. 18 in A major, K 464: rec 1953 [2V=JG]; CD reissue Sony SM2K-47219.
- Mozart: Quartet No. 19 in C major, K 465 'Dissonant': rec 1953 [2V=JG]; CD reissue Sony SM2K-47219.
- Mozart: String Quintet No. 1 in B flat major, K 174:

- with Walter Trampler: rec 1956 [2V=AS]; CD reissue Sony SM3K-46527.
- with Walter Trampler: stereo rec 1965-1966 [2V=AS]; LP Col D3S-747; CD reissue Sony CSCR 8346.

- Mozart: String Quintet No. 2 in C minor, K 406:

- with Milton Katims: rec 1946 [2V=EO]; CD reissue Sony SM3K-46527.
- with Walter Trampler: stereo rec 1965-1966 [2V=AS]; LP Col D3S-747; CD reissue Sony CSCR 8346.

- Mozart: String Quintet No. 3 in C major, K 515:

- with Milton Katims: rec 1945 [2V=EO]; CD reissue Sony SM3K-46527.
- with Walter Trampler: stereo rec 1965-1966 [2V=AS]; LP Col D3S-747; CD reissue Sony CSCR 8346.

- Mozart: String Quintet No. 4 in G minor, K 516:

- with Milton Katims: rec 1941 [2V=AS]; CD reissue Sony SM3K-46527.
- with Walter Trampler: stereo rec 1965-1966 [2V=AS]; LP Col D3S-747; CD reissue Sony CSCR 8346.

- Mozart: String Quintet No. 5 in D major, K 593:

- with Milton Katims: rec 1946 [2V=EO]; CD reissue Sony SM3K-46527.
- with Walter Trampler: stereo rec 1965-1966 [2V=AS]; LP Col D3S-747; CD reissue Sony CSCR 8346.

- Mozart: String Quintet No. 6 in E flat major, K 614:

- with Milton Katims: rec 1949 [2V=JG]; CD reissue Sony SM3K-46527.
- with Walter Trampler: stereo rec 1965-1966 [2V=AS]; LP Col D3S-747; CD reissue Sony CSCR 8346.

- Mozart: Piano Quartet in G minor, K 478:

- with George Szell: rec 1946 [2V=EO]; CD reissue CBS MPK-47685, Naxos Hist 8.111238.
- with Mieczysław Horszowski: stereo rec 1963 [2V=AS]; CD reissue Sony SM3K-46527.

- Mozart: Piano Quartet in E flat major, K 493:

- with George Szell: rec 1946 [2V=EO]; CD reissue CBS MPK-47685, Naxos Hist 8.111238.
- with Mieczysław Horszowski: stereo rec 1963 [2V=AS]; LP Col MS-6683.

- Mozart: Clarinet Quintet in A major, K 581 'Stadler', with David Oppenheim: stereo rec 1959 [2V=AS]; CD reissue Sony SM3K-46527.
- Mozart: Serenade in G major, K 525 'Eine kleine Nachtmusik' [string quintet version, with Julius Levine, double bass]: stereo rec 1959 [2V=AS]; CD reissue Sony SM3K-46527.
- Ravel: Quartet in F major (1902–03): CD reissue CBS MPK-44843.
- Schubert: Quartet in A minor, D 804 'Rosamunde': rec 1953 [2V=JG]; CD reissue CBS MPK-45696.
- Schubert: Quartet in D minor, D 810 'Death and the Maiden': rec 1953 [2V=JG]; CD reissue CBS MPK-45696.
- Schubert: Quartet in G Major, D 887: rec 1953 [2V=JG]; LP reissue Odyssey Y3-33320.
- Schubert: String Quintet in C major, D 956, with Benar Heifetz, cello: rec 16/9/1941 [2V=AS]; CD reissue United Archives UPC 3760138170262.
- Schubert: Piano Quintet in A major, D 667 'The Trout':

- with Mieczysław Horszowski and Julius Levine: CD reissue Sony SBK-46343.
- with Mieczysław Horszowski and Georges E. Moleux: rec 8/5/1950; LP Philips SBR 6220; CD reissue United Archives UPC 3760138170262.

- Schumann: Piano Quintet in E flat major, Op. 44:

- with Clifford Curzon: rec 1951 [2V=JG]; LP Col ML-4426; CD reissue Naxos Hist 8.110306.
- with Rudolf Serkin: stereo rec 1963 [2V=AS]; CD reissue CBS MYK-37256.

=== Miscellaneous live recordings ===
1st Violin: Josef Roisman; 2nd Violin: Alexander Schneider or Edgar Ortenberg; Viola: Boris Kroyt; Cello: Mischa Schneider

- Beethoven: Quartet No. 1 in F major, Op. 18, No. 1 (rec live March 23, 1944 [2V=EO] at Library of Congress; CD reissue Bridge 9342 A/B).
- Beethoven: Quartet No. 2 in G major, Op. 18, No. 2 (rec live April 13, 1944 [2V=EO] at Library of Congress; CD reissue Bridge 9342 A/B).
- Beethoven: Quartet No. 3 in D major, Op. 18, No. 3 (rec live March 9, 1944 [2V=EO] at Library of Congress; CD reissue Bridge 9342 A/B).
- Beethoven: Quartet No. 4 in C minor, Op. 18, No. 4 (rec live March 30, 1962 [2V=AS] at Library of Congress; CD reissue Bridge 9342 A/B).
- Beethoven: Quartet No. 5 in A major, Op. 18, No. 5 (rec live November 1, 1943 [2V=AS] at Library of Congress; CD reissue Bridge 9342 A/B).
- Beethoven: Quartet No. 6 in B flat major, Op. 18, No. 6 (rec live November 11, 1960 [2V=AS] at Library of Congress; CD reissue Bridge 9342 A/B).
- Beethoven: Quartet No. 7 in F major, Op. 59, No. 1 (rec live October 26, 1941 [2V=AS] at Library of Congress; CD reissue Bridge 9099 A/C).
- Beethoven: Quartet No. 8 in E minor, Op. 59, No. 2 (rec live April 1, 1960 [2V=AS] at Library of Congress; CD reissue Bridge 9099 A/C).
- Beethoven: Quartet No. 9 in C major, Op. 59, No. 3 (rec live March 6–7, 1946 [2V=EO] at Library of Congress; CD reissue Bridge 9099 A/C).
- Beethoven: Quartet No. 10 in E flat major, Op. 74 (rec live September 7, 1941 [2V=AS] at Library of Congress; CD reissue Bridge 9099 A/C).
- Beethoven: Quartet No. 11 in F minor, Op. 95 (rec live March 3, 1940 [2V=AS] at Library of Congress; CD reissue Bridge 9099 A/C).
- Beethoven: Quartet No. 12 in E flat major, Op. 127 (rec live March 15, 1941 [2V=AS] at Library of Congress; CD reissue Bridge 9072 A/C).
- Beethoven: Quartet No. 13 in B flat major, Op. 130 (rec live April 7, 1960 [2V=AS] at Library of Congress; CD reissue Bridge 9072 A/C).
- Beethoven: Quartet No. 14 in C sharp minor, Op. 131 (rec live May 7, 1943 [2V=AS] at Library of Congress; CD reissue Bridge 9072 A/C).
- Beethoven: Quartet No. 15 in A minor, Op. 132 (rec live December 20, 1945 [2V=EO] at Library of Congress; CD reissue Bridge 9072 A/C).
- Beethoven: Quartet No. 16 in F major, Op. 135 (rec live March 16, 1943 [2V=AS] at Library of Congress; CD reissue Bridge 9072 A/C).
- Beethoven: Grosse Fuge in B flat major, Op. 133 (rec live April 7, 1960 [2V=AS] at Library of Congress; CD reissue Bridge 9072 A/C).
- Beethoven: Piano Trio No. 9 in G major, Op. 121a 'Kakadu Variations', with George Szell (rec live May 16, 1946, at Library of Congress; CD reissue Intaglio INCD 7191).
- Brahms: Piano Quintet in F minor, Op. 34, with George Szell (rec live October 11, 1945, at Library of Congress; CD reissue Bridge 9062).
- Dvořák: Piano Quintet in A major, Op. 81, with Artur Balsam (rec live 1959 [2V=AS] at New York; CD reissue Documents LV 931/32).
- Mozart: Quartet No. 16 in E flat major, K 428 (rec live 1959 [2V=AS] at New York; CD reissue Documents LV 931/32).
- Schubert: Quartet in D minor, D 810 'Death and the Maiden' (rec live 1959 [2V=AS] at New York; CD reissue Documents LV 931/32).
- Schubert: Piano Quintet in A major, D 667 'The Trout', with George Szell (rec live May 16, 1946, at Library of Congress; CD reissue Intaglio INCD 7191).

== Sources ==
- Brandt, Nat (1993). Con Brio: Four Russians Called the Budapest String Quartet. Oxford University Press, USA. ISBN 0-19-508107-2.
- R.D. Darrell, The Gramophone Shop Encyclopedia of Recorded Music (New York 1936).
- E. Sackville-West and D. Shawe-Taylor, The Record Year 2 (Collins, London 1953).
- Photograph in R. Stowell (Ed), Cambridge Companion to the String Quartet (2003).
- CD Biddulph 80222-2 (P)2005, UPC 744718022229. [1933-1935 Beethoven recordings (78 rpm)]
- CD Sony MH2K-62870 2-disc set (P)1997, UPC 074646287026; and CD Sony MH2K-62873 2-disc set (P)1997, UPC 0074646287323. [1940–1945 Beethoven recordings (78 rpm)]
- CD United Archives NUA01 8-disc set (P)2010, UPC 5494239160010 [1951-1952 mono Beethoven recordings (vinyl LP)]
- CD Sony Classical Masters 8-disc set (P)&(C)2010, UPC 886977767821. [1958-1961 stereo Beethoven recordings (vinyl LP)]
- CD Sony SBK 46545 (C)1991 UPC 07464465452; and CD SBK 47665 (C)1991 UPC 07464476652. [1959-1961 stereo Beethoven recordings (vinyl LP)]
