= Maurice Gordon Clarke =

American athlete and coach (1877–1944)

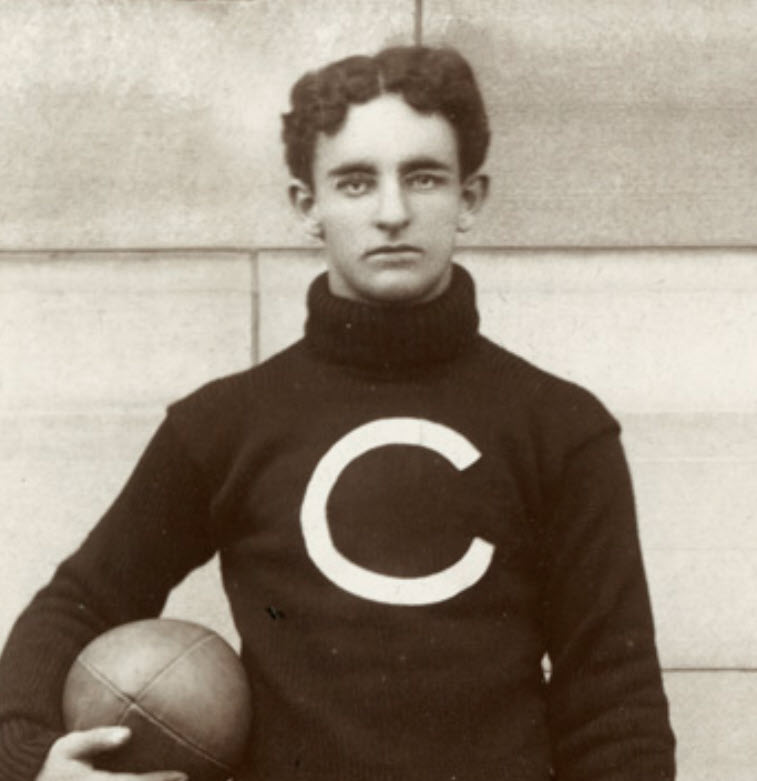

Biographical details
- Born: May 2, 1877; Bellevue, Nebraska, U.S.
- Died: June 5, 1944 (aged 67); Okmulgee, Oklahoma, U.S.

Playing career

Football
- 1896–1898: Chicago
- Positions: Quarterback, halfback

Coaching career (HC unless noted)

Football
- 1899: Texas
- 1900: Western Reserve
- 1901: Washington University

Baseball
- 1900: Texas

Head coaching record
- Overall: 15–8–3 (football); 14–2–1 (baseball)

Maurice Gordon Clarke (May 2, 1877 – June 5, 1944) was an American college football and college baseball player and coach. The Omaha, Nebraska native served as head football coach at the University of Texas at Austin in 1899, at Western Reserve University—now a part of Case Western Reserve University—in 1900, and at Washington University in St. Louis in 1901, compiling a career football coaching record of 15–8–3. He was also the head baseball coach at Texas in the spring of 1900, tallying a mark of 14–2–1.

Clarke was a graduate of the University of Chicago and played quarterback for the Chicago Maroons from 1896 to 1898 teams under Amos Alonzo Stagg. He also lettered in baseball at Chicago.

== Personal life ==
Clarke was born May 2, 1877, in Bellevue, Nebraska, to Henry T. Clarke Sr. and Martha A. Fielding Clarke, and had many siblings, including baseball player and coach Henry T. Clarke Jr.

Clarke later went into the oil business in Okmulgee, Oklahoma. He died there on June 5, 1944.

== Head coaching record ==
=== Football ===
| Year | Team | Overall | Conference | Standing | Bowl/playoffs |
|---|---|---|---|---|---|
Texas Longhorns (Southern Intercollegiate Athletic Association) (1899)
| 1899 | Texas | 6–2 | 3–2 | 7th | |
| Texas: | | 6–2 | 3–2 | | |
Western Reserve (Independent) (1900)
| 1900 | Western Reserve | 4–3–2 | | | |
| Western Reserve: | | 4–3–2 | | | |
Washington University (Independent) (1901)
| 1901 | Washington University | 5–3–1 | | | |
| Washington University: | | 5–3–1 | | | |
| Total: | | 15–8–3 | | | |

=== Baseball ===
Record table
| Season | Team | Overall | Conference | Standing | Postseason |
|---|---|---|---|---|---|
Texas Longhorns (Southern Intercollegiate Athletic Association) (1900)
| 1900 | Texas | 14–2–1 | | | |
| Texas: | | 14–2–1 (.853) | | | |
| Total: | | 14–2–1 (.853) | | | |
