= Milton Katims =

American violist and conductor

- Born: June 24, 1909
- Died: February 27, 2006 (aged 96)
- Genres: classical music
- Occupations: violist, conductor, arranger

Milton Katims (June 24, 1909 – February 27, 2006) was an American violist and conductor. He was music director of the Seattle Symphony for 22 years (1954–76). In that time he added more than 75 works, made recordings, premiered new pieces and led the orchestra on several tours. He expanded the orchestra's series of family and suburban outreach concerts. He is also known for his numerous transcriptions and arrangements for viola.

== Career ==
Katims was born in Brooklyn and educated at Columbia University. His parents were from Russia and the Austro-Hungarian Empire. His father changed the family surname from Katimsky some years after he arrived in New York. He started as a violinist but the Belgian-born violist, conductor and educator Léon Barzin advised him to switch to viola. Katims played with a number of chamber music ensembles, including the New York Piano Quartet, and was an extra violist with the notable Budapest String Quartet with which he collaborated for 15 years and made six highly regarded recordings, beginning in 1941. He played at various festivals like the Casals Festival in Puerto Rico.

Katims gave viola master classes in China and Israel, taught at various colleges such as Juilliard in New York and Northwestern in suburban Chicago, as well as the University of Washington, and transcribed and edited viola music. He joined the NBC Symphony Orchestra in 1943, replacing the well-known William Primrose on the first-desk of the section. During his decade with the orchestra, Katims developed a close relationship with conductor Arturo Toscanini and became his assistant. He conducted orchestras such as the New York Philharmonic, Philadelphia Orchestra, Boston Symphony, London Philharmonic, Cleveland Orchestra and Montreal Symphony. He organized a series of chamber music concerts titled Candlelight Musicales, in the Spanish Ballroom of the Olympic Hotel, with visiting soloists such as violinist Isaac Stern, cellist Leonard Rose and pianists Leon Fleisher and Claudio Arrau. Katims often would play his viola and his wife Virginia, the cello. One of Katims' major accomplishments in Seattle was the conversion of the Civic Auditorium into the Opera House. His leadership was crucial in securing public money for the project, the auditorium destined to be shared by Seattle Opera and Pacific Northwest Ballet as well as the Seattle Symphony.

In 1966, Katims was named Seattle's 'First Citizen' by the Seattle Real Estate Board, and his portrait was featured on the cover of the Seattle telephone book. From 1976 to 1985 Katims served as artistic director of the University of Houston School of Music. His influence enabled the school to attract and hire several notable musicians, such as Carlisle Floyd, Elena Nikolaidi, and Abbey Simon, to the faculty.

== Later years/death ==
The Pleasure Was Ours, a joint memoir by Katims and his wife Virginia, was published in 2004. He died of heart failure in Shoreline, Washington on February 27, 2006, aged 96.

== Sources ==
- Eichler, Jeremy, "Milton Katims, 96, Conductor Who Led Seattle Symphony, Dies", New York Times, March 2, 2006.
