= Henry Clarke (baseball) =

American baseball player, coach, lawyer, and politician (1875–1950)

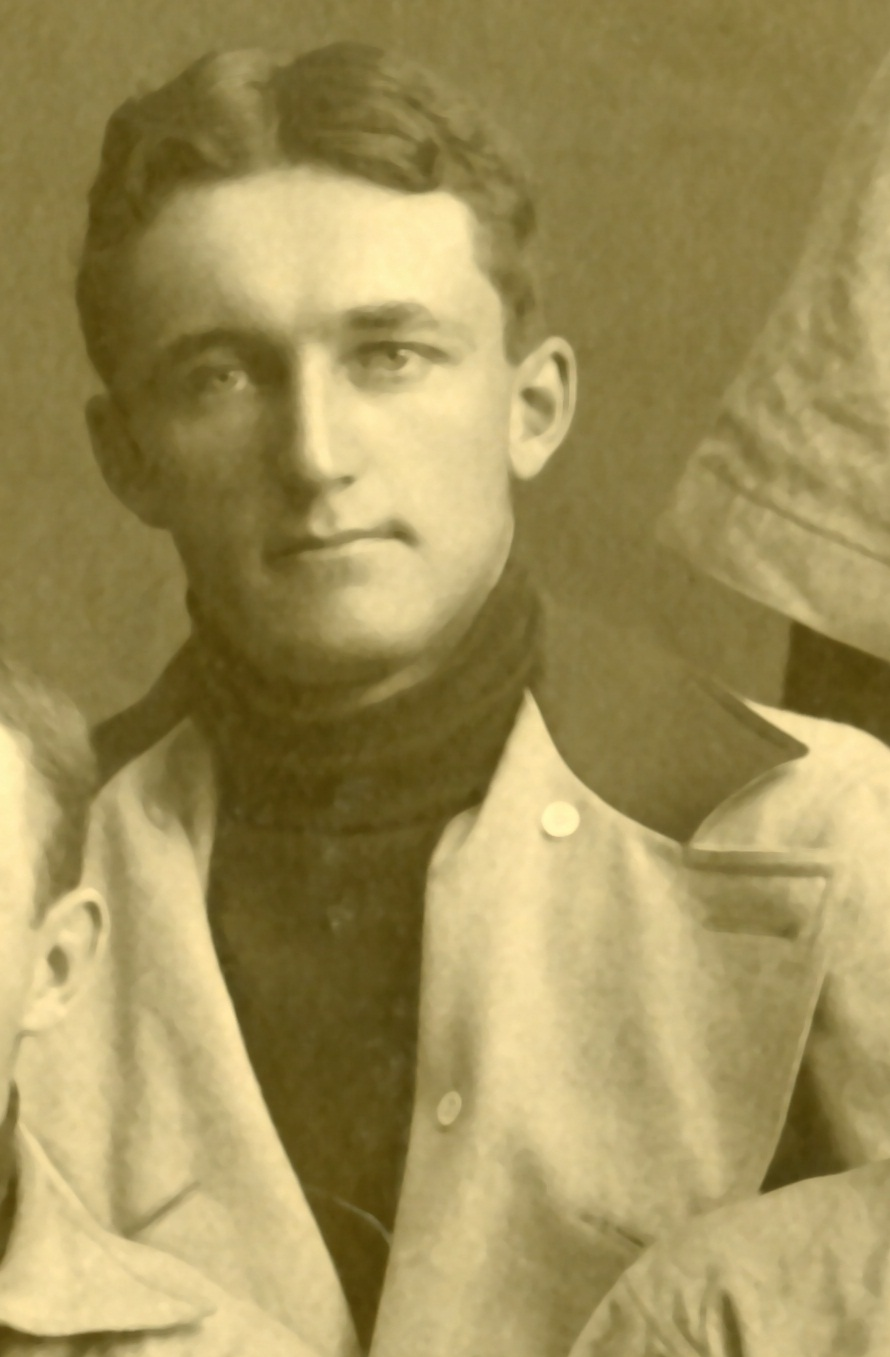
- Pitcher/Outfielder
- Born: August 4, 1875; Bellevue, Nebraska, U.S.
- Died: March 28, 1950 (aged 74); Colorado Springs, Colorado, U.S.
- Batted: Right Threw: Right

MLB debut
- June 26, 1897, for the Cleveland Spiders

Last MLB appearance
- July 5, 1898, for the Chicago Orphans

MLB statistics
- Win–loss record: 1–4
- Earned run average: 4.99
- Strikeouts: 4
- Stats at Baseball Reference

Teams
- Cleveland Spiders (1897); Chicago Orphans (1898)

Henry Tefft Clarke, Jr. (August 4, 1875 – March 28, 1950) was an American baseball player and coach, lawyer and politician. He played Major League Baseball pitcher for the Cleveland Spiders in 1897 and the Chicago Orphans in 1898. He was also a coach for the Michigan Wolverines baseball team. He later served as a Nebraska state legislator and railroad commissioner.

== Early years ==
Clarke was born in August 1875 at Bellevue, Nebraska. His father, Henry T. Clarke, Sr., was a well-known merchant who served in the Nebraska territorial legislature. Clarke was educated in the public school at Bellevue until 1882. He attended the public schools in Omaha, Nebraska from 1882 to 1892. He graduated from Omaha High School in 1892 as the class valedictorian. He was brother to fellow player, coach Maurice Gordon Clarke.

== Williams College ==
In 1892, Clarke enrolled at Williams College in Massachusetts and played on the college's varsity baseball team. In 1893, he made his debut in a victory over the Yale Law School. The New York Times reported: "Williams had a new pitcher, Clarke, '96 during the first half of the game. He did creditably but showed lack of experience." A later article made note of Clarke's pitching skills as a sophomore in 1894: "He will be remembered by Eastern college men for good work in the box his sophomore year at Williams College, when he gave Lewis a close rub for the position of 'Varsity pitcher.'" In May 1894, The New York Times reported that Clarke had been "fairly effective," except in the first inning, and hit a "beautiful home run" in a loss to Harvard.

== University of Chicago ==
In the fall of 1894, he transferred to the University of Chicago. He received his bachelor's degree from the University of Chicago in 1896 and remained there for a year of post-graduate work. He played for Amos Alonzo Stagg's Chicago Maroons football team in 1895 and 1896, and also played for the Stagg's Chicago Maroons baseball team in 1895, 1896 and 1897. He was the captain of Chicago's 1897 baseball team. Chicago's baseball team compiled records of 15-5, 19-11, and 17-4 during the three years Clarke was a player. In a review of the 1897 baseball season, Outing magazine wrote: "Henry Clarke, their captain, has proved himself an able leader and is head and shoulders above every other pitcher in this section." The Chicago Daily Tribune gave much of the credit for Chicago's 1897 record to Clarke: "The largest element in the success of the institution by the Midway was the phenomenal pitching of Henry Clarke. If victory can be accredited to any one man that man was Clarke last year."

While attending the University of Chicago, Clarke was also president of his class, president of the glee club, and a member of the Lion's Head and the O. & S. senior honorary society.

== Major League Baseball ==
In May 1897, Clarke won a tryout with the Boston Beaneaters. The Chicago Daily Tribune reported that, during Clarke's tryout, Boston manager Frank Selee had been remarked that Clarke had "good speed, an excellent change of pace, combined with curves that kept the Boston men guessing." Clarke signed instead with the Cleveland Spiders, joining a pitching staff that included Cy Young. Between June 26 and August 2, 1897, Clarke appeared in five games for Cleveland, compiling a record of 0 wins and 4 losses and an earned run average of 5.87. Clarke also appeared in two games as an outfielder in 1897 and compiled a batting average of .280.

Clarke also briefly returned to Major League Baseball as a pitcher for the Chicago Orphans in 1898. He appeared in only one game as a pitcher for Chicago, a 5-4 victory over the Cleveland Spiders. His 1898 record was 1-0 with a 2.00 earned run average.

== University of Michigan ==
Clarke enrolled at the University of Michigan Law School in the fall of 1897. He received his law degree from Michigan in June 1899. While attending law school, he served as the assistant coach of the Michigan Wolverines baseball team in 1898 and the head coach in 1899. In February 1899, The Michigan Alumnus wrote:

Next to the presence of a lot of new player the question of having a good all round coach is important. There will be no doubt on that score this year ad the management has hired Henry Clarke, the famous ex-Chicago pitcher, who for the past two years has been a student in the law department here and was last year assistant coach of the baseball team. . ... He brings to the duties of his advanced position a knowledge of the game in all its departments, a long schooling on the best college teams, and a valuable experience in National League company. His aid to the battery candidates will be invaluable and as he was regarded as Chicago's crack batsman for two years his development of Michigan's comparatively weak stick work will be watched with interest.

In addition to his position as head coach, Clarke also appeared as a player in several of Michigan's games in 1899. In mid-April 1899, the Wolverines played two games against Milwaukee, a professional baseball team from the Western League. After Michigan gave up seven runs in the second game, Clarke came into the game as a pitcher and pitched the final six innings. He held the Milwaukee team scoreless for two innings, but he gave up eight runs in the sixth inning, two in the seventh and one in the eighth. Michigan lost the game 18-1.

Clarke also appeared in two games against the Hamilton Club of Chicago in May 1899. Michigan won both games by scores of 4-3 and 6-1. During Clarke's two seasons as a baseball coach, the team compiled records of 15-6 and 14-5 and finished 2nd and 1st in the Western Conference.

Clarke was also the coach of Michigan's all-freshman football team in 1898.

== Legal and political career ==
In the fall of 1899, Clarke was admitted to the Illinois bar and joined the Chicago law firm of Church, McMurdy & Sherman.

Clarke returned to Nebraska in 1900 and established a law partnership with Frank Crawford, a classmate from the University of Michigan who also served as Michigan's first football coach in 1891. They practiced law together as Crawford & Clarke from 1900 to 1905.

In 1904, Clarke was elected as a Republican to the Nebraska House of Representatives. He was reelected to the same office in 1906. Clarke was the sponsor of a child labor bill that passed the Nebraska legislature and was signed into law in 1907. He was also active in the passage of a pure food law.

In March 1907, Clarke was appointed as a Nebraska railroad commissioner by Governor George L. Sheldon, following a vacancy on the commission. He was elected to the position in a special election in the fall of 1907. He was elected to a full six-year term in 1910.

Clarke worked from at least 1918 to 1920 as a traffic manager and attorney for the Omaha Grain Exchange.

Clarke was a member of the Masons, the Elks, the Royal Arcanum, the Omaha Club, the Fontanelle Club, the Omaha Commercial Club, the Lincoln Commercial Club, the Lincoln Country Club and the Episcopal church.

== Family and later years ==
Clarke was the son of Henry T. Clarke Sr. and Martha A. Fielding Clarke.

Clarke married in September 1901 to Grace Louise Allen. They had three children, Allen Gordon Clarke, William Cleveland Clarke and Henry T. Clarke III.

Clarke spent the last year of his life at the Emory John Brady Hospital, a psychiatric hospital in Colorado Springs, Colorado. He reportedly suffered from Alzheimer's disease. He died in Colorado Springs in March 1950 at age 74.
