= List of music students by teacher: R to S =

This is part of a list of students of music, organized by teacher.

== R ==
=== Alexander Raab ===
this teacher's teachers
Raab (1882–1958) studied with teachers including Robert Fuchs and Theodor Leschetizky.
- Ernst Bacon [pupils]
- Vera Bradford
- George J. Buelow
- Muriel Kerr
- Wanda Krasoff
- Mortimer Markoff
- Sumner Marshall
- Robert Owens
- Allan Arthur Willman

=== Sergei Rachmaninoff ===
this teacher's teachers
Rachmaninoff (1873–1943) studied with teachers including Anton Arensky, Alexander Siloti, Sergei Taneyev, and Nikolai Zverev.
- Gina Bachauer
- Ruth Slenczynska [pupils]

=== Philip Radcliffe ===
this teacher's teachers
Radcliffe (1905-1986) studied with teachers including Edward Joseph Dent and Henry Moule.
- Philip Brett
- Jeremy Dibble
- Peter Dickinson
- Sebastian Forbes
- Richard Hey Lloyd
- Stephen Wilkinson

=== Robert Radeke ===
- Bruno Walter [pupils]

=== Jean-Théodore Radoux ===
- Henriette van den Boorn-Coclet

=== Priaulx Rainier ===
this teacher's teachers
Rainier (1903–1986) studied with teachers including John Blackwood McEwen, Nadia Boulanger, and Rowsby Woof.
- Timothy Baxter
- Nigel Butterley
- Rachel Cavalho
- Jeremy Dale Roberts [pupils]
- Christopher Small
- Geoffrey Winters

=== Joachim Raff ===
- John Arthur St. Oswald Dykes [pupils]
- Algernon Ashton
- Edward MacDowell [pupils]
- Alexander Ritter
- Anton Urspruch [pupils]
- Lazzaro Uzielli [pupils]
- August Wilhelmj [pupils]

=== Nikolai Rakov ===
this teacher's teachers
Rakov (1908–1990) studied with teachers including Reinhold Glière and Sergei Vasilenko.
- Edison Denisov [pupils]
- Alfred Schnittke

=== Jean-Philippe Rameau ===
this teacher's teachers
Rameau (1683–1764) studied with teachers including Jean Rameau.
- Claude Balbastre [pupils]
- François-Joseph Gossec [pupils]
- Thérèse Boutinon des Hayes

=== Günther Ramin ===
- Helmut Walcha

=== James K. Randall ===
this teacher's teachers
Randall (1929–2014) studied with teachers including Milton Babbitt and Leonard Shure.
- Daniel Catán

=== Alberto Randegger ===
Sopranos

- Liza Lehmann
- Greta Williams
- Ellen Beach Yaw

Mezzo-sopranos

- Mary Davies

Contraltos

- Augusta Mary Wakefield

Tenors

- William Hayman Cummings
- Ben Davies

Baritones

- Charles W. Clark [pupils]

Basses

- Darrell Fancourt
- Putnam Griswold
- William Howland
- Robert Radford
- Frederick Ranalow

=== Bernard Rands ===
this teacher's teachers
Rands (born 1934) studied with teachers including Luciano Berio, Pierre Boulez, Luigi Dallapiccola, and Bruno Maderna.
- Sidney Corbett
- Steed Cowart
- Michael Daugherty [pupils]
- Beth Denisch
- Paul Dresher
- Du Yun
- David Felder
- Daron Hagen
- Vic Hoyland
- Danny Kastner
- Lam Bun-Ching
- Jing Jing Luo
- Roger Marsh [pupils]
- Lansing McLoskey
- Marc Mellits
- Dominic Muldowney
- Karola Obermueller
- Elena Ruehr
- Robert Scott Thompson
- Ken Ueno

=== Agosto Rattenbach ===
- Susanne Erding-Swiridoff

=== Wilhelm Rauch ===
this teacher's teachers
Rauch (fl. 1884–1924) studied with teachers including unknown .
- Camilla Frydan
- Theodor Fuchs [pupils]
- Manolis Kalomiris
- Richard Stöhr [pupils]
- Alexander von Zemlinsky [pupils]

=== Felix Rault ===
this teacher's teachers
Rault studied with teachers including Michel Blavet.
- François Devienne
- Johann Georg Wunderlich [pupils]

=== Einojuhani Rautavaara ===
- Magnus Lindberg
- Esa-Pekka Salonen

=== Venanzio Rauzzini ===
this teacher's teachers
Rauzzini (1746–1810) studied with teachers including Muzio Clementi, Domenico Corri, Nicola Porpora, and Giuseppe Santarelli.
- John Braham
- Charles Edward Horn [pupils]
- Michael Kelly
- Nancy Storace
- Stephen Storace

=== Alan Rawsthorne ===
this teacher's teachers
Rawsthorne (1905–1971) studied with teachers including Carl Fuchs, Frank Merrick, and Egon Petri.
- Gerard Schurmann

=== Ernest Read ===
this teacher's teachers
Read (1879–1965) studied with teachers including Tobias Matthay and Henry Wood.
- Edwin Bélanger
- William Ifor Jones
- King Palmer
- Beryl Price

=== Maurice Ravel ===
this teacher's teachers
Ravel (1875–1937) studied with teachers including Henri Ghys, Émile Decombes, Charles-Wilfrid de Bériot, Émile Pessard, André Gedalge, and Gabriel Fauré.
- Leo Arnaud
- Maurice Delage
- Vlado Perlemuter [pupils]
- Alexis Roland-Manuel
- Manuel Rosenthal
- Germaine Tailleferre
- Ralph Vaughan Williams [pupils]

=== Gardner Read ===
this teacher's teachers
Read (1913–2005) studied with teachers including Howard Hanson, Bernard Rogers, Aaron Copland, and Ildebrando Pizzetti.
- Frank D'Accone
- Carlton Gamer
- Michael Horvit
- Anthony Newman
- Elizabeth Walton Vercoe

=== Napoléon Henri Reber ===
this teacher's teachers
Reber (1807–1880) studied with teachers including Jean-François Le Sueur and Anton Reicha.
- Adolphe Danhauser
- Jules Massenet [pupils]
- Jules Auguste Wiernsberger
- Władysław Żeleński

=== Janine Reding ===
this teacher's teachers
Janine Reding (1920–2015) studied with teachers including Arthur De Greef, Kurt Leimer, Erich Kleiber, and Berthe Laventurier.
- Hans-Peter Stenzl
- Volker Stenzl

=== Anton Rée ===
this teacher's teachers
Rée (1820–1886) studied with teachers including Anton Halm, Karl Krebs, and Jacques Smitt.
- Frits Hartvigson [pupils]

=== Max Reger ===
this teacher's teachers
Reger (1873–1916) studied with teachers including Albert Fuchs and Hugo Riemann.
- Vincenzo Davico
- Hermann Grabner [pupils]
- Joseph Haas
- Sándor Jemnitz
- Jaroslav Kvapil
- Ruben Liljefors
- Fernando Liuzzi
- Albert van Raalte
- Erwin Schulhoff
- Carl Schuricht
- George Szell [pupils]
- Cristòfor Taltabull
- Yuliya Veysberg
- Jaromír Weinberger
- Mortimer Wilson

=== Willy Rehberg ===
- Emil Frey
- Ernst Toch [pupils]

=== Anton Reicha ===
this teacher's teachers
Reicha (1770–1836) studied with teachers including Johann Georg Albrechtsberger.
- Adolphe Adam [pupils]
- Auguste Barbereau [pupils]
- Hector Berlioz
- Henri Cohen
- Charles Dancla [pupils]
- Antoine Elwart [pupils]
- Friedrich von Flotow
- César Franck [pupils]
- Narcisse Girard [pupils]
- Charles Gounod [pupils]
- Albert Grisar
- Henri Herz [pupils]
- Jean-Georges Kastner [pupils]
- Henry Lemoine [pupils]
- Franz Liszt [pupils]
- George Onslow
- Napoléon Henri Reber [pupils]
- Eugène Sauzay [pupils]
- Ludwig Schuncke
- Waldemar Thrane
- Pauline Viardot [pupils]
- Henri Vieuxtemps [pupils]

=== Johann Adam Reincken ===
this teacher's teachers
Reincken (1643–1722) studied with teachers including Lucas van Lennick and Heinrich Scheidemann.
- Georg Böhm [pupils] (likely)
- Andreas Kneller [pupils]
- Georg Dietrich Leyding [pupils]

=== Carl Reinecke ===
this teacher's teachers
Reinecke (1824-1910) studied with teachers including Felix Mendelssohn, Robert Schumann, and Franz Liszt.
- Isaac Albéniz
- Horton Claridge Allison
- Adolf Barjansky
- Fritz Brase
- Max Bruch [pupils]
- Ferruccio Busoni [pupils]
- Mikalojus Konstantinas Čiurlionis
- Frederic Cowen
- T. J. Crawford
- Fanny Davies
- Constanta Erbiceanu
- Max Fiedler
- Felix Fox
- Richard Franck
- Albert Fuchs [pupils]
- Edvard Grieg [pupils]
- Basil Harwood
- Battison Haynes [pupils]
- Ernest Hutcheson [pupils]
- Leoš Janáček [pupils]
- Willem Kes [pupils]
- Iwan Knorr [pupils]
- James Kwast [pupils]
- John Lund
- Aleksander Michałowski [pupils]
- Walter Niemann
- Ernst Perabo [pupils]
- Percy Pitt [pupils]
- Felix vom Rath
- Julius Röntgen [pupils]
- Amanda Röntgen-Maier
- Cornelius Rübner
- Christian Sinding
- Dame Ethel Smyth
- Max Spicker
- Charles Villiers Stanford [pupils]
- Johan Svendsen
- Willi and Louis Thern
- Frank Van der Stucken
- Max Vogrich
- Felix Weingartner
- Sara Wennerberg-Reuter
- Arthur Willner
- August Winding
- Helen Hopekirk

=== Fritz Reiner ===
this teacher's teachers
Reiner (1888–1963) studied with teachers including Béla Bartók, István Thomán, and Leo Weiner.
- Leonard Bernstein [pupils]
- Vincent Persichetti [pupils]

=== N. M. Reingbald ===
- Emil Gilels

=== Johann Georg Reinhardt ===
- Giuseppe Bonno [pupils]

=== Alfred Reisenauer ===
this teacher's teachers
Reisenauer (1863–1907) studied with teachers including Louis Köhler and Franz Liszt.
- Sergei Bortkiewicz
- Sigfrid Karg-Elert
- Alexandre Mottu
- Anatol von Roessel

=== Nadia Reisenberg ===
this teacher's teachers
Reisenberg (1904–1983) studied with teachers including Leonid Nikolayev and Josef Hofmann.
- Sophia Agranovich
- Artur Balsam
- Rami Bar-Niv
- Victoria Bond
- Natan Brand
- Elena Braslavsky
- Edward Gold
- Richard Goode
- Zvi Keren
- Richard Kogan
- Andrew Litton
- Steven Lubin
- Pascal Nemirovski
- Mischa Portnoff
- Mel Powell
- Shulamit Ran
- Bella Shumiatcher
- Jeanne Singer
- Hai-Kyung Suh

=== Franz Reizenstein ===
this teacher's teachers
Reizenstein (1911-1968) studied with teachers including Paul Hindemith, Leonid Kreutzer, Ralph Vaughan Williams, Constant Lambert, Solomon Cutner, and Felix Weingartner.
- Eric Hope
- Philip Martin
- Benjamin Kaplan
- David Wilde

=== Ottorino Respighi ===
this teacher's teachers
Respighi (1879–1936) studied with teachers including Nikolai Rimsky-Korsakov.
- Vincenzo di Donato [pupils]
- Mario Labroca
- Normand Lockwood [pupils]
- Vittorio Rieti [pupils]
- Gianluca Tocchi
- Luigi Silva

=== Jean de Reszke ===
this teacher's teachers
studied with teachers including Antonio Cotogni and Giovanni Sbriglia.
- Bessie Abott
- Clive Carey [pupils]
- Claire Croiza
- Isabel Stevens Lathrop
- Miriam Licette
- Vladimir Rosing
- Mafalda Salvatini
- Bidu Sayão
- Leo Slezak
- Maggie Teyte

=== Louis-Charles-Joseph Rey ===
this teacher's teachers
Rey (1738–1811) studied with teachers including Martin Berteau.
- Henri-Montan Berton [pupils]

=== José Rey de la Torre ===
- Manuel Barrueco
- Terry Bremkamp
- Robert Phillips
- Anthony Weller

=== Roger Reynolds ===
this teacher's teachers
Reynolds (born 1934) studied with teachers including Ross Lee Finney and Roberto Gerhard.

University of California, San Diego

- Mark Applebaum, Associate Professor of Music, Stanford University
- Xavier Beteta, Assistant Professor of Music, Wheaton College
- Rick Bidlack, Signals and Noises, software development
- Juan Campoverde, Composer, Chicago
- Rick Carrick, Composer and Conductor
- Ben Leeds Carson, Professor of Music, Founding Director of Creative Technologies, University of California, Santa Cruz
- John Celona, Professor of Composition, University of Victoria School of Music
- Wendy Mae Chambers
- Antonio Cunha, Professor of Music, University of Rio del Sol, Porto Allegre, Brazil
- Elisabet Curbelo, Assistant Professor of Electroacoustic Composition and Music Theory, University of Utah
- Chaya Czernowin [pupils], Walter Bigelow Rosen Professor of Music, Harvard University
- Nicholas Deyoe, Composer, Director of Instrumental Arts Programs, California Institute of the Arts
- Paul Dresher, Director, The Paul Dresher Ensemble, Oakland, California
- Peter Ivan Edwards, Associate Professor, Yong Siew Toh Conservatory of Music (Singapore)
- David Felder, Distinguished Professor, SUNY Buffalo
- Peter Gordon
- Adam Greene, Freelance Composer, San Diego
- Larry Groupé, Emmy-winning composer
- Andrés Gutiérrez, Post-doctoral Researcher, ACTOR Project, McGill University
- Ben Hackbarth, Head of Composition, Department of Music at University of Liverpool
- Kerry Hagan, Lecturer, University of Limerick
- Aaron Helgeson, Associate Professor of Composition, Montclair State University
- Laure Hiendl, Freelance Composer, Berlin
- Brenda Hutchinson [pupils], Composer and Author
- Jan Järvlepp, Freelance cellist, composer, Ottawa
- Keith Johnson, Professor of Music, Mission College, Santa Clara, California
- David Evan Jones, Professor of Music and UCSC Porter College Provost, University of California, Santa Cruz
- Joseph Julian, Freelance Composer
- Jarosław Kapuściński, Associate Professor of Composition and Director of Intermedia Performance Lab, Stanford University
- Derek Keller, Associate Professor of Music, Southern Oregon University
- Joseph Klein, Distinguished Professor and Chair of the Division of Composition, University of North Texas
- Paul Koonce, Emeritus Professor of Music, University of Florida
- Olli Kortekangas, Composer, Finland
- Keith Kothman, Director and Professor, School of Music, Western Michigan University
- Lam Bun-Ching, Freelance Composer, New York
- Kei-ju Lin, Music Director M.O.V.E. (Taipei)
- Larry Livingston, Professor of Conducting at the University of Southern California
- Andrew May, Associate Professor and Director of CEMI, University of North Texas
- Iioannis Mitsialis, Freelance musician, Köln, Germany
- Mizue Mizushima, Freelance composer, Tokyo
- Fernanda Aoki Navarro, Assistant Professor of Composition, Arizona State University
- Nathaniel Phillips, Composer, Educator, Sound Artist, Portland, Oregon
- Thanassis Rikakis, Dean of Iovine and Young Academy for Arts Technology and Innovation, University of Southern California
- François Rose, Senior Lecturer, Department of Music, Stanford University
- Jason Rosenberg, Assistant Professor of Composition, Sewanee, The University of the South
- Benjamin Sabey, Composer, Assistant Professor, San Francisco State University
- Robert Scott Thompson, Professor of Music Composition, Georgia State University
- Eric Simonson, Professor, Danville Community College, Virginia
- Ung Wha Son, Instructor in Music, UC Irvine
- Steven Takasugi, Associate of the Music Department, Harvard University
- Ori Talmon, Composer, Köln, Germany
- Johan Tallgren, Director, Helsinki Biennale, Viitasaari, Finland
- Michael Theodore, Associate Professor of Music Composition and Technology, University of Colorado Boulder
- Christopher Tonkin, Head of Composition Studies and Music Technology, University of Western Australia
- Erik Ulman, Lecturer, Stanford University
- Nicolas Vérin, Professor of Music, École Nationale de Musique et de Danse d'Évry
- Rolf Wallin, Freelance composer, Oslo, Norway
- Robert Wannamaker, Associate Dean, California Institute of the Arts, Los Angeles
- Ryan Welsh, Program Manager for Educational Initiatives, Longy School of Music, Boston
- Kevin Zhang, Assistant Professor of Music, California State University, San Bernardino
- Tiange Zhou, Associate Researcher, School of Future Design, Beijing Normal University

Yale (while visiting professor)

- Michael Daugherty [pupils], Professor of Composition, University of Michigan
- Michael Gordon, Faculty member, NYU Steinhardt; Co-founder, Bang on a Can
- David Lang, Co-Founder, Bang on a Can
- Scott Lindroth, Professor and Vice Provost of the Arts, Duke University
- Joseph Waters, Professor of Music, San Diego State University

=== Josef Rheinberger ===
this teacher's teachers
Rheinberger (1839–1901) studied with teachers including Franz Lachner.
- William Berwald [pupils]
- Stanislav Binički
- George Whitefield Chadwick [pupils]
- Frederick Converse [pupils]
- Aloys Fleischmann (Senior)
- Wilhelm Furtwängler
- Arthur Hinton
- Engelbert Humperdinck [pupils]
- Henry Holden Huss
- Robert Kahn [pupils]
- Bruno Klein [pupils]
- Hans von Koessler [pupils]
- Stevan Mokranjac [pupils]
- Horatio Parker [pupils]
- Joseph Pembaur [pupils]
- Percy Pitt [pupils]
- Josef Renner
- Max von Schillings [pupils]
- Hermann Scholtz
- Arthur Smolian
- Ferdinand Thieriot
- Ludwig Thuille [pupils]
- Adolf Weidig [pupils]
- Friedrich Weigmann
- Arthur Willner
- Ermanno Wolf-Ferrari [pupils]
- Philipp Wolfrum

=== Mark Richman ===
- Victor Villacorta

=== Ernst Richter ===
this teacher's teachers
Richter (1808–1879) studied with teachers including Christian Theodor Weinlig.
- Horton Claridge Allison
- Mikhail Azanchevsky
- Frederic Cowen
- John Farmer [pupils]
- Albert Fuchs [pupils]
- Iwan Knorr [pupils]
- Arthur O'Leary [pupils]
- Robert Papperitz [pupils]
- Ernst Perabo [pupils]
- Max Spicker
- Franklin Taylor [pupils]
- Otto Zimmer

=== Franz Xaver Richter ===
- Joseph Ignaz Bieling
- František Xaver Pokorný
- Carl Stamitz

=== Hans Richter ===
- Max Vogrich

=== Allard de Ridder ===
this teacher's teachers
de Ridder (1887–1966) studied with teachers including Hermann Abendroth, Fritz Steinbach, and Johan Wagenaar.
- John Avison
- Lloyd Blackman
- Hans Gruber
- Ricky Hyslop

=== Jaroslav Řídký ===
- Karel Husa
- Sláva Vorlová

=== Carl Riedel ===
- Julius Reubke
- Hermann Scholtz

=== Gottfried Rieger ===
this teacher's teachers
Rieger (1764–1855) studied with teachers including Father Damasus Brosmann.
- Adolf Müller Sr. [pupils]
- Pavel Křížkovský [pupils]
- Anton Emil Titl

=== Wallingford Riegger ===
this teacher's teachers
Riegger (1885–1961) studied with teachers including Percy Goetschius.
- Robert Ashley [pupils]
- Henry Brant
- Merton Brown
- Morton Feldman [pupils]
- Richard Franko Goldman
- Alan Stout [pupils]
- Gil Trythall

=== Hugo Riemann ===
- Ignaz Friedman [pupils]
- Walter Niemann
- Henryk Opieński
- Max Reger [pupils]
- Vladimir Alexievitch Seniloff
- Adolf Weidig [pupils]

=== André van Riemsdijk ===
this teacher's teachers
Riemsdijk (1848–1904) studied with teachers including August Lehrmann and Hubert Léonard.
- Felice Togni [pupils]
- Abraham Troostwijk

=== Joseph Riepel ===
- František Xaver Pokorný
- Johann Christoph Vogel

=== Ferdinand Ries ===
this teacher's teachers
Ries (1784–1838) studied with teachers including Johann Georg Albrechtsberger, Ludwig van Beethoven, and Peter von Winter.
- Gertrude van den Bergh
- Anton Gerke [pupils]

=== Vittorio Rieti ===
this teacher's teachers
Rieti (1898–1994) studied with teachers including Giuseppe Frugatta.
- Marc-Antonio Consoli

=== Julius Rietz ===
this teacher's teachers
Rietz (1812–1877) studied with teachers including Moritz Ganz, Bernhard Romberg, and Carl Friedrich Zelter.
- Woldemar Bargiel [pupils]
- Felix Otto Dessoff [pupils]
- Salomon Jadassohn [pupils]
- Arthur O'Leary [pupils]
- Arthur Sullivan [pupils]

=== André-Jean Rigade ===
- Felice Bambini

=== Wolfgang Rihm ===
this teacher's teachers
Rihm (born 1952) studied with teachers including Wolfgang Fortner, Klaus Huber, and Karlheinz Stockhausen.
- David Philip Hefti
- Márton Illés
- Jan Kopp
- Rebecca Saunders
- Andrea Lorenzo Scartazzini
- Jagoda Szmytka
- Jörg Widmann
- Boris Yoffe
- Vykintas Baltakas
- Vito Žuraj
- Sauli Zinovjev
- Nico Sauer

=== Terry Riley ===
this teacher's teachers
Riley (born 1935) studied with teachers including Robert Erickson, Pran Nath, and Seymour Shifrin.
- Mark Alburger
- Michael Harrison
- Beth Anderson
- Joanna Brouk
- Barbara Golden
- Peter Gordon

=== Stephen Francis Rimbault ===
this teacher's teachers
Rimbault (1773–1837) studied with teachers including Joseph Diettenhofer, James Hook, and John Samuel Charles Possin.
- Edward Francis Rimbault
- Charles Kensington Salaman [pupils]

=== Georgi Rimski-Korsakov ===
this teacher's teachers
G. Rimski-Korsakov (1901–1965) studied with teachers including Maximilian Steinberg, Nikolay Sokolov, Sergei Liapunov, and Leonid Nicolai.
- Galina Ustvolskaya [pupils]

=== Nikolai Rimsky-Korsakov ===
this teacher's teachers
Rimsky-Korsakov (1844-1908) studied with teachers including Mily Balakirev and Anton Gerke.
- Anton Arensky [pupils]
- Semyon Barmotin [pupils]
- Vladimir Drozdov [pupils]
- Alexander Glazunov [pupils]
- Mikhail Gnessin
- Konstanty Gorski [pupils]
- Mikhail Ippolitov-Ivanov [pupils]
- Artur Kapp [pupils]
- Nikolai Kazanli [pupils]
- Ivan Kryzhanovsky [pupils]
- Anatoly Lyadov [pupils]
- Mykola Lysenko
- Witold Maliszewski [pupils]
- Nikolai Malko [pupils]
- Emil Młynarski [pupils]
- Nikolai Myaskovsky [pupils]
- Alexander Ossovsky
- Sergei Prokofiev
- Ottorino Respighi [pupils]
- Leonid Sabaneyev [pupils]
- Lazare Saminsky
- Vladimir Alexievitch Seniloff
- Alexander Spendiaryan
- Igor Stravinsky [pupils]
- Nikolai Tcherepnin [pupils]
- Yuliya Veysberg

=== Berthe Ringold ===
- Emil Gilels

=== Christian Heinrich Rinck ===
this teacher's teachers
Rinck (1770–1846) studied with teachers including Johann Christian Kittel.
- Charles Hallé [pupils]
- Georg Vierling

=== Édouard Risler ===
this teacher's teachers
Risler (1873–1929) studied with teachers including Émile Decombes, Louis Diémer, and Théodore Dubois.
- Jacques Février [pupils]
- Noël Gallon [pupils]

=== August Gottfried Ritter ===
this teacher's teachers
A. G. Ritter (1811–1885) studied with teachers including August Wilhelm Bach, Ludwig Berger, Michael Gotthard Fischer, Johann Nepomuk Hummel, Andreas Ketschau, and Friedrich Rungenhagen.
- Gerrit Smith
- Carl Martin Reinthaler
- Eduard Rohde
- Hermann Schröder

=== Frédéric Louis Ritter ===
this teacher's teachers
F. L. Ritter (1834–1891) studied with teachers including Moritz Hauptmann, Jean-Georges Kastner, and Hans Michael Schletterer.
- Edward Dannreuther [pupils]
- Albert Ross Parsons

=== Théodore Ritter ===
this teacher's teachers
Ritter (1840–1886) studied with teachers including Franz Liszt.
- Isidor Philipp [pupils]

=== Achille Rivarde ===
this teacher's teachers
Rivarde (1865–1940) studied with teachers including Charles Dancla, František Ondříček, and Henryk Wieniawski.
- Anthony Collins
- Eugene Aynsley Goossens

=== Jean Rivier ===
this teacher's teachers
Rivier (1896–1987) studied with teachers including Georges Caussade and Jean Gallon.
- Gerd Boder
- Charles Chaynes
- Pedro Ipuche Riva
- Antoine Tisné
- Tôn-Thất Tiết
- Gareth Walters

=== Max Roach ===
- Al Levitt

=== Sylvio Robazzi ===
this teacher's teachers
Sylvio Robazzi studied with teachers including Yara Bernette.
- Fernando Calixto
- Rafael de Abreu Ribeiro
- Daniel de Vito
- Daniel Tarquínio [pupils]

=== Richard Robert ===
this teacher's teachers
Robert (1861–1924) studied with teachers including Julius Epstein, Franz Krenn, and Anton Bruckner.
- Theo Buchwald
- Julius Chajes
- Hans Gál [pupils]
- Wilhelm Grosz (aka Hugh Williams)
- Clara Haskil
- Marjan Rawicz
- Alfred Rosé
- Marcel Rubin
- Rudolf Schwarz [pupils]
- Rudolf Serkin [pupils]
- George Szell [pupils]
- Frederic Waldmann
- Vally Weigl
- Viktor Zuckerkandl

=== Sarah Robinson-Duff ===
this teacher's teachers
Robinson-Duff (died 1934) studied with teachers including Mathilde Marchesi and George Henschel.
- Jessie Bartlett Davis
- Nora Bayes
- Olive Fremstad
- Mary Garden
- Frieda Hempel
- Florence Kimball [pupils]
- Mary McCormic
- Alice Nielsen
- Marcia Van Dresser

=== Louise Robyn ===
- Ruth Crawford Seeger [pupils]

=== George Rochberg ===
this teacher's teachers
Rochberg (1918–2005) studied with teachers including Leopold Mannes, Gian Carlo Menotti, Rosario Scalero, George Szell, and Hans Weisse.
- Stephen Albert
- William Albright [pupils]
- Gaston Allaire
- Maryanne Amacher
- William Bolcom
- Uri Caine
- Robert Carl
- Daniel Dorff
- Stephen Hartke
- Michael Hersch
- Stephen Jaffe
- Robert Kyr
- Cynthia Cozette Lee
- Gerald Levinson
- Philip Maneval
- Vincent McDermott
- Neva Pilgrim
- Paul Reale
- Michael Alec Rose
- Andrew Rudin
- Robert Suderburg
- Lu Yen

=== Richard Shepherd Rockstro ===
this teacher's teachers
R. S. Rockstro (1826–1906) studied with teachers including Richard Carte.
- William Lewis Barrett [pupils]

=== W. S. Rockstro ===
this teacher's teachers
Rockstro (1823–1895) studied with teachers including William Sterndale Bennett and Felix Mendelssohn.
- Thomas Dunhill [pupils]
- Howard Hadley [pupils]
- John Alexander Fuller Maitland

=== Pierre Rode ===
this teacher's teachers
Rode (1774–1830) studied with teachers including Giovanni Battista Viotti.
- Joseph Böhm [pupils]
- Jean-Henri Simon [pupils]

=== Johann Theodor Roemhildt ===
this teacher's teachers
Roemhildt (1684–1756) studied with teachers including Johann Kuhnau and Johann Schelle.
- Johann Ernst Altenburg

=== Jean Roger-Ducasse ===
this teacher's teachers
Roger-Ducasse (1873–1954) studied with teachers including Émile Pessard, André Gedalge, and Gabriel Fauré.
- Jehan Alain
- Claude Arrieu
- Sirvart Kalpakyan Karamanuk
- Jean-Louis Martinet
- Francis George Scott

=== Bernard Rogers ===
this teacher's teachers
Rogers (1893–1968) studied with teachers including Ernest Bloch, Nadia Boulanger, and Percy Goetschius.
- Dominick Argento [pupils]
- Jack Beeson [pupils]
- Frank Bencriscutto
- William Bergsma [pupils]
- David Borden
- John Davison
- David Diamond [pupils]
- John Diercks
- Walter Hartley
- Joseph Willcox Jenkins
- Ulysses Kay
- John La Montaine [pupils]
- Richard Lane
- Caroline Lloyd
- Martin Mailman
- Peter Mennin [pupils]
- Burrill Phillips [pupils]
- Raymond Premru
- Gardner Read [pupils]
- H. Owen Reed
- Gloria Wilson Swisher
- Mary Jeanne van Appledorn
- Robert Ward
- John Weinzweig [pupils]

=== Alessandro Rolla ===
this teacher's teachers
Rolla (1757–1841) studied with teachers including Giovanni Andrea Fioroni.
- Cesare Pugni

=== José Rolón ===
- Blas Galindo

=== Anton Romberg ===
this teacher's teachers
Romberg (1742–1814) studied with teachers including (unknown) .
- Kaspar Fürstenau
- Bernhard Romberg [pupils]

=== Bernhard Romberg ===
this teacher's teachers
Romberg (1767–1841) studied with teachers including Robert Papperitz and Anton Romberg.
- Friedrich Dotzauer
- Ferdinand Ries [pupils]
- Julius Rietz [pupils]
- Count Matwei Georgevitch Vielhorsky

=== Jesse Ronneau ===
- Ann Cleare

=== Julius Röntgen ===
this teacher's teachers
Röntgen (1855–1932) studied with teachers including Franz Lachner and Carl Reinecke.
- Martinus Sieveking

=== William Michael Rooke ===
this teacher's teachers
Rooke (1794–1847) studied with teachers including Philip Cogan.
- Michael William Balfe

=== Cyril Rootham ===
this teacher's teachers
Rootham (1875–1938) studied with teachers including Marmaduke Barton, Walter Parratt, Hubert Parry, Daniel Rootham, and Charles Villiers Stanford.
- Arthur Bliss
- Arnold Cooke
- Armstrong Gibbs
- Patrick Hadley
- Walter Leigh
- Basil Maine
- Robin Orr
- Bernard Stevens [pupils]
- Percy Young

=== Cipriano de Rore ===
- Luzzasco Luzzaschi [pupils]

=== Ned Rorem ===
this teacher's teachers
Rorem (1923–2022) studied with teachers including Margaret Bonds, Aaron Copland, Rosario Scalero, Leo Sowerby, and Virgil Thomson.
- Roger Briggs
- Daron Hagen
- Jennifer Higdon

=== Bernard Rose ===
- Roger Bray
- Harry Christophers
- Tony Hewitt-Jones
- David Hiley
- Michael Hurd
- Kenneth Leighton
- Dudley Moore
- Eric Wetherell
- David Wulstan

=== Leonard Rose ===
- Myung-wha Chung
- Matt Haimovitz
- Yehuda Hanani
- Lynn Harrell
- Desmond Hoebig
- Ronald Leonard
- Yo-Yo Ma
- John Sant'Ambrogio
- Sara Sant'Ambrogio
- Fred Sherry
- Lori Singer
- Donald Whitton
- Eric Wilson

=== Daniel Roseingrave ===
this teacher's teachers
D. Roseingrave (c.1655–1727) studied with teachers including John Blow and Henry Purcell.
- Thomas Roseingrave [pupils]

=== Thomas Roseingrave ===
this teacher's teachers
T. Roseingrave (c. 1690 or 1691–1766) studied with teachers including Daniel Roseingrave.
- Henry Carey
- John Christopher Smith
- John Stanley
- John Worgan

=== Hilding Rosenberg ===
this teacher's teachers
Rosenberg (1892–1985) studied with teachers including Ernst Ellberg and Wilhelm Stenhammar.
- Sven-Erik Bäck
- Karl-Birger Blomdahl [pupils]
- Daniel Börtz
- Ingvar Lidholm [pupils]

=== David Rosenboom ===
this teacher's teachers
Rosenboom (born 1947) studied with teachers including Kenneth Gaburo, Lejaren Hiller, and Salvatore Martirano.
- Gino Robair

=== Jakob Rosenhain ===
- Julius Sachs

=== Orla Rosenhoff ===
this teacher's teachers
Rosenhoff (1844–1905) studied with teachers including Niels Gade.
- Tekla Griebel-Wandall
- Carl Nielsen [pupils]

=== Moriz Rosenthal ===
this teacher's teachers
Rosenthal (1862–1946) studied with teachers including Franz Liszt, Rafael Joseffy, and Karol Mikuli.
- Jorge Bolet
- Robert Goldsand [pupils]
- Hedwig Kanner-Rosenthal [pupils]
- Charles Rosen

=== Lauro Rossi ===
- Antônio Carlos Gomes

=== Walter Henry Rothwell ===
this teacher's teachers
Rothwell (1872–1927) studied with teachers including Gustav Mahler.
- Marion Bauer [pupils]

=== Christopher Rouse ===
this teacher's teachers
Rouse (born 1949) studied with teachers including Randolph Coleman, George Crumb, and Robert Moffat Palmer.
- Kamran Ince
- Marc Mellits
- Nico Muhly
- Robert Paterson
- Kevin Puts
- D. J. Sparr
- Michael Torke
- Jude Vaclavik

=== Jean-Marie Rousseau ===
this teacher's teachers
Rousseau (1734–1774) studied with teachers including unknown .
- Nicolas Roze [pupils]

=== Albert Roussel ===
this teacher's teachers
Roussel (1869–1937) studied with teachers including Vincent d'Indy and Eugène Gigout.
- Georges Auric
- Georges Dandelot
- Paul Le Flem [pupils]
- Bohuslav Martinů [pupils]
- Georgios Poniridis
- Erik Satie
- Edgard Varèse [pupils]

=== Pietro Rovelli ===
this teacher's teachers
Rovelli (1793-1838) studied with teachers including Rodolphe Kreutzer.
- Bernhard Molique [pupils]
- Thomas Täglichsbeck

=== Giovanni Rovetta ===
this teacher's teachers
Rovetta (1595/97–1668) studied with teachers including Claudio Monteverdi.
- Giovanni Legrenzi [pupils]
- Giovanni Battista Volpe [pupils]

=== Edwin Roxburgh ===
this teacher's teachers
Roxburgh (born 1937) studied with teachers including Herbert Howells, Terence MacDonagh, Nadia Boulanger, and Luigi Dallapiccola.
- Luke Bedford
- Darren Bloom
- David Braid
- Richard Causton [pupils]
- Dai Fujikura
- Daniel Giorgetti
- Helen Grime
- Kenneth Hesketh [pupils]
- Rolf Hind
- Jonathan Lloyd
- Roger Redgate
- David Warburton

=== Nicolas Roze ===
this teacher's teachers
Roze (1745–1819) studied with teachers including Jean-Marie Rousseau.
- Alexandre-Étienne Choron [pupils]
- Jean-François Le Sueur [pupils]

=== Alexsander Różycki ===
- Ludomir Różycki
- Arthur Rubinstein

=== Edmund Rubbra ===
this teacher's teachers
Rubbra (1901–1986) studied with teachers including Gustav Holst and R. O. Morris.
- Peter Crossley-Holland
- Christopher Gunning
- Gary Higginson
- Nicholas Jackson
- Wilfrid Mellers
- Richard Mills
- Armin Schibler
- Peter Sculthorpe
- Patric Standford

=== Ernesto Rubin de Cervin ===
this teacher's teachers
Rubin de Cervin (1936–2013) studied with teachers including Luigi Dallapiccola, Roberto Lupi, Bruno Maderna, Gian Francesco Malipiero, Virgilio Mortari, and Goffredo Petrassi.
- Giuseppe Sinopoli

=== Anton Rubinstein ===
this teacher's teachers
Rubinstein (1829–1894) studied with teachers including Siegfried Dehn, Adolf Bernhard Marx, and Alexander Villoing.
- Ella Adayevskaya
- Esmeralda Athanasiu-Gardeev
- Felix Blumenfeld [pupils]
- Teresa Carreño [pupils]
- Sandra Drouker
- Josef Hofmann [pupils]
- Cornelius Rübner
- William Charles Ernest Seeboeck [pupils]
- Pyotr Ilyich Tchaikovsky [pupils]
- Eugen von Volborth

=== Arthur Rubinstein ===
this teacher's teachers
Rubinstein (1887-1982) studied with teachers including Karl Heinrich Barth.
- Ann Schein Carlyss
- François-René Duchâble
- Janina Fialkowska
- Barbara Hesse-Bukowska [pupils]
- Eugen Indjic
- Dean Kramer
- Avi Schönfeld
- Dubravka Tomšič Srebotnjak
- Leokadiya Kashperova
- Maria Lluïsa Ponsa

=== Nikolai Rubinstein ===
this teacher's teachers
Rubinstein (1835–1881) studied with teachers including Theodor Kullak, Siegfried Dehn, and Alexander Villoing.
- Michael Hambourg [pupils]
- Ernst Jedliczka
- Henryk Pachulski
- Emil von Sauer [pupils]
- Alexander Siloti [pupils]
- Sergei Taneyev [pupils]

=== Dane Rudhyar ===
- Johanna Beyer

=== Ernst Rudorff ===
this teacher's teachers
Rudorff (1840–1916) studied with teachers including Woldemar Bargiel, Moritz Hauptmann, Ignaz Moscheles, Louis Plaidy, Carl Reinecke, and Julius Rietz.
- Fridtjof Backer-Grøndahl
- Wilhelm Berger
- Leo Blech
- Gerard von Brucken Fock
- Alexandre Rey Colaço
- Leopold Godowsky
- Elsie Hall
- Natalia Janotha
- Siegfried Ochs
- Clemens Schmalstich
- Carl Schuricht
- Alfred Sormann
- Bernhard Stavenhagen [pupils]

=== Josef Rufer ===
this teacher's teachers
Rufer (1893–1985) studied with teachers including Arnold Schoenberg and Alexander von Zemlinsky.
- Bernhard Krol
- Isang Yun [pupils]

=== Johann Rufinatscha ===
- Ignaz Brüll
- Julius Epstein

=== Francesco Ruggi ===
this teacher's teachers
Ruggi (1767–1845) studied with teachers including Fedele Fenaroli.
- Vincenzo Bellini
- Michele Carafa [pupils]

=== Carl Friedrich Rungenhagen ===
this teacher's teachers
Rungenhagen (1778–1851) studied with teachers including Carl Friedrich Zelter.
- August Conradi
- Alexander Fesca
- Louis Lewandowski
- Albert Lortzing
- Stanisław Moniuszko [pupils]
- Richard Wüerst [pupils]
- Franz Wüllner [pupils]

=== William Russo ===
this teacher's teachers
Russo (1928–2003) studied with teachers including Lennie Tristano.
- Neil Ardley
- John Barry
- Patrick Gowers
- Mark Hollmann
- Fred Karlin
- W. A. Mathieu
- Richard Peaslee

=== Wilhelm Karl Rust ===
- Dorothea von Ertmann
- Wilhelm Rust

=== Ferdinando Rutini ===
- Michele Neri-Bondi

=== Bronisław Rutkowski ===
- Joachim Grubich [pupils]

== S ==
=== Kaija Saariaho ===
- Johan Tallgren

=== Boris Sabaneyev ===
this teacher's teachers
Sabaneyev, B. (−1918) studied with teachers including Sergei Taneyev.
- Joseph Yasser

=== Leonid Sabaneyev ===
this teacher's teachers
Sabaneyev, L. (1881–1968) studied with teachers including Nikolai Rimsky-Korsakov, Sergei Taneyev, and Nikolai Zverev.
- Gösta Nystroem
- Dag Wirén

=== Giovanni Maria Sabino ===
this teacher's teachers
Sabino (1588−1649) studied with teachers including Prospero Testa.
- Giovanni Salvatore [pupils]
- Gregorio Strozzi

=== Antonio Sacchini ===
this teacher's teachers
Sacchini (1730–1786) studied with teachers including Francesco Durante and Gennaro Manna.
- Henri-Montan Berton [pupils]
- Domenico Cimarosa
- Joseph Mazzinghi
- Nancy Storace

=== Vasily Safonov ===
this teacher's teachers
Safonov (1852–1918) studied with teachers including Louis Brassin, Theodor Leschetizky, and Nikolai Zaremba.
- Alexander Goedicke
- Wiktor Łabuński [pupils]
- Maria Levinskaya
- Josef Lhévinne
- Rosina Lhévinne
- Nikolai Medtner
- Alexander Scriabin [pupils]
- Marthe Servine

=== Camille Saint-Saëns ===
this teacher's teachers
Saint-Saëns (1835–1921) studied with teachers including François Benoist, Fromental Halévy, and Camille-Marie Stamaty.
- Cécile Chaminade
- Gabriel Fauré [pupils]
- Eugène Gigout [pupils]
- Reynaldo Hahn [pupils]
- André Messager
- Isidor Philipp [pupils]
- Albert van Raalte

=== Nicola Sala ===
this teacher's teachers
Sala (1713–1801) studied with teachers including Nicola Fago and Lionardo Leo.
- Valentino Fioravanti
- Ambrogio Minoja
- Ferdinando Orlandi
- Angelo Tarchi

=== Michele Saladino ===
- Vittore de Sabbata

=== Charles Kensington Salaman ===
this teacher's teachers
Salaman (1814–1901) studied with teachers including William Crotch, Henri Herz, Charles Neate, and Stephen Francis Rimbault.
- Cécile Hartog
- Ebenezer Prout [pupils]

=== Baltasar Saldoni ===
- Cristóbal Oudrid

=== Ney Salgado ===
this teacher's teachers
Ney Salgado (1935–2015) studied with teachers including Jose Kliass.
- André von Frasunkiewicz [pupils]

=== Antonio Salieri ===
this teacher's teachers
Salieri (1750–1825) studied with teachers including Johann Adolph Hasse, Christoph Willibald Gluck, Florian Leopold Gassmann, Giovanni Battista Pescetti, and Giuseppe Simoni.
- Marianna Auenbrugger
- Ludwig van Beethoven [pupils]
- Antonio Casimir Cartellieri
- Carl Czerny [pupils]
- Johann Nepomuk Hummel [pupils]
- Franz Liszt [pupils]
- Giacomo Meyerbeer [pupils]
- Ignaz Moscheles [pupils]
- Franz Xaver Wolfgang Mozart
- Maria Theresia von Paradis [pupils]
- Anton Reicha [pupils]
- Franz Schubert
- Franz Xaver Süssmayr
- Ignaz Umlauf [pupils]
- Joseph Weigl
- Peter Winter

=== Thomas Salignac ===
- Charles Kullman

=== Aulis Sallinen ===
- Jouni Kaipainen

=== Johann Peter Salomon ===
this teacher's teachers
Salomon (bap. 1745 - 1815) studied with teachers including Philipp Salomon.
- Charles Hague [pupils]
- Christian Friedrich Müller
- George Pinto

=== Timothy Salter ===
this teacher's teachers
Salter (born 1942) studied with teachers including York Bowen and Lamar Crowson.
- David Bruce
- Simon Dobson

=== Giovanni Salvatore ===
this teacher's teachers
Salvatore (ca.1620–ca.1688) studied with teachers including Erasmo Bartolo and Giovanni Maria Sabino.
- Gaetano Greco [pupils]
- Francesco Provenzale [pupils]
- Gennaro Ursino [pupils]

=== Carlos Salzedo ===
- Carol Baum
- Ruth Berman Harris
- Marjorie Call
- Alice Chalifoux
- Marilyn Costello Dannenbaum
- Margarita Czonka Montanaro
- Edward Druzinsky
- Reinhard Elster
- Elyze Ilku
- Danis Kelly
- Lucile Lawrence
- Heidi Lehwalder
- Lucy Lewis
- Judy Loman
- Marie Miller Satterlee
- Djina Ostrowska
- Lynne Wainwright Palmer
- Edna Phillips
- Casper Reardon
- Marjorie Tyre
- Florence Wightman

=== Felix Salzer ===
this teacher's teachers
Salzer (1904–1986) studied with teachers including Heinrich Schenker and Hans Weisse.
- Guido Adler
- Karel Navrátil [pupils]
- Carl Schachter [pupils]

=== Olga Samaroff ===
this teacher's teachers
Samaroff (1880–1948) studied with teachers including Ludovic Breitner, Élie-Miriam Delaborde, Ernst Jedliczka, Antoine François Marmontel, and Charles-Marie Widor.
- Isabelle Yalkovsky Byman
- Martin Canin
- Richard Farrell
- Stewart L. Gordon
- Edith Grosz
- Natalie Hinderas
- Bruce Hungerford
- William Kapell
- Raymond Lewenthal
- Eugene List
- Jerome Lowenthal
- Margaret Saunders Ott
- Vincent Persichetti [pupils]
- Thomas Schippers
- Claudette Sorel
- Alfred Teltschik
- Rosalyn Tureck
- Alexis Weissenberg

=== Leon Sametini ===
this teacher's teachers
Sametini (1886–1944) studied with teachers including Bram Eldering, Otakar Ševčík, Felice Togni, and Eugène Ysaÿe.
- Harry Adaskin [pupils]
- Guila Bustabo [pupils]
- Isolde Menges [pupils]
- Silvestre Revueltas [pupils]
- Aaron Rosand [pupils]

=== Giovanni Battista Sammartini ===
- Christian Cannabich [pupils]
- Christoph Willibald Gluck [pupils]

=== Marcel Samuel-Rousseau ===
- Jean-Michel Damase
- Rolande Falcinelli [pupils]

=== Cesare de Sanctis ===
this teacher's teachers
Sanctis (1824–1916) studied with teachers including Giuseppe Baini and Raffaele Muti-Papazzurri.
- Domenico Alaleona
- Attilio Parelli
- Giacomo Setaccioli [pupils]

=== György Sándor ===
this teacher's teachers
Sándor (1912–2005) studied with teachers including Béla Bartók and Zoltán Kodály.
- James Bastien
- Malcolm Bilson
- Hélène Grimaud
- Barbara Nissman
- Ian Pace
- Aleksandra Romanić
- György Sebők
- Ezequiel Viñao

=== Alfredo Sangiorgi ===
this teacher's teachers
Sangiorgi (1894–1962) studied with teachers including Goffredo Petrassi and Arnold Schoenberg.
- Aldo Clementi

=== Pedro Sanjuan ===
- Alejandro García Caturla
- Amadeo Roldán

=== Domingo Santa Cruz ===
this teacher's teachers
Santa Cruz (1899–1987) studied with teachers including Alberto Guerrero.
- Juan Orrego-Salas
- Ida Vivado

=== Giuseppe Santarelli ===
- Muzio Clementi [pupils]
- Venanzio Rauzzini [pupils]

=== Cláudio Santoro ===
this teacher's teachers
Santoro (1919–1989) studied with teachers including Nadia Boulanger and Hans-Joachim Koellreutter.
- Gilberto Mendes

=== Konstantin Saradzhev ===
this teacher's teachers
Saradzhev (1877–1954) studied with teachers including Jan Hřímalý, Otakar Ševčík, and Sergei Taneyev.
- Leo Ginzburg [pupils]

=== Pablo de Sarasate ===
this teacher's teachers
Sarasate (1844–1908) studied with teachers including Jean-Delphin Alard.
- Alfredo D'Ambrosio

=== Giuseppe Saratelli ===
this teacher's teachers
Saratelli (1714–1762) studied with teachers including Antonio Lotti.
- Andrea Luchesi
- Johann Gottfried Schwanberg

=== Malcolm Sargent ===
this teacher's teachers
Sargent (1895–1967) studied with teachers including Benno Moiseiwitsch.
- Sidney Beer
- Frank Bury
- Howard Ferguson [pupils]
- Peggy Glanville-Hicks
- Constant Lambert [pupils]
- Edward Lockspeiser
- Colin Mawby
- Michael Tippett [pupils]

=== Giuseppe Sarti ===
this teacher's teachers
Sarti (1729–1802) studied with teachers including Giovanni Battista Martini.
- Luigi Cherubini [pupils]

=== Erik Satie ===
this teacher's teachers
Satie (1866–1925) studied with teachers including Émile Decombes, Albert Lavignac, Georges Mathias, Antoine Taudou, and Gustave Vinot.
- Francis Poulenc [pupils]

=== Emil von Sauer ===
this teacher's teachers
Sauer (1862–1942) studied with teachers including Ludwig Deppe, Franz Liszt, and Nikolai Rubinstein.
- Gisa Adler
- Isolde Ahlgrimm
- Webster Aitken [pupils]
- Stefan Askenase
- Elfi von Dassanowsky
- Kurt Engel
- Robert Goldsand
- Edward Goll
- Ernst Gröschel
- Toni Grunschlag
- Else Herold
- Ignace Hilsberg
- Maryla Jonas
- Lubka Kolessa
- Mischa Kottler
- Ozan Marsh
- Elly Ney
- Charles Proctor
- Florica Racovitză-Flondor
- Dario Raucea
- Marie Aimée Varro
- Paul Weingarten

=== Gordon Saunders ===
this teacher's teachers
Saunders (1837–1912) studied with teachers including Edward John Hopkins, Henry Litolff, William Rea, and Elizabeth Stirling.
- Granville Bantock [pupils]
- James Langran

=== Émile Sauret ===
this teacher's teachers
Sauret (1852–1920) studied with teachers including Charles Auguste de Bériot, Salomon Jadassohn, Henri Vieuxtemps, and Henryk Wieniawski.
- Tor Aulin
- Ethel Barns
- Jan Hambourg
- Marjorie Hayward
- William Henry Reed
- Florizel von Reuter
- Gerald Walenn
- John Waterhouse

=== Eugène Sauzay ===
this teacher's teachers
Sauzay (1809–1901) studied with teachers including Pierre Baillot and Anton Reicha.
- Carl Flesch [pupils]

=== Marie Gabriel Augustin Savard ===
this teacher's teachers
Savard (1814–1881) studied with teachers including Fromental Halévy and Jules Massenet.
- Cécile Chaminade
- Gerónimo Giménez
- Edward MacDowell [pupils]
- Jules Massenet [pupils]
- Eduard Reuss

=== Georges Savaria ===
this teacher's teachers
Savaria (born 1916) studied with teachers including Louis Aubert, Claude Champagne, Jean-Yves Daniel-Lesur, Lazare Lévy, Marguerite Long, and Olivier Messiaen.
- Albert Grenier
- Jacques Hétu

=== Robert Saxton ===
this teacher's teachers
Saxton (born 1953) studied with teachers including Robin Holloway, Elisabeth Lutyens, and Robert Sherlaw Johnson.
- Christopher Austin
- Oscar Bettison
- Julia Gomelskaya
- Stuart MacRae
- Cecilia McDowall
- William Mival
- Deborah Pritchard
- Ryszard Szeremeta
- Sophie Viney

=== Giovanni Sbriglia ===
- Lillian Nordica
- Pol Plançon
- Édouard de Reszke
- Jean de Reszke [pupils]
- Josephine de Reszke
- Vladimir Rosing
- Sybil Sanderson

=== Marco Scacchi ===
- Angelo Berardi

=== Rosario Scalero ===
this teacher's teachers
Scalero (1870–1954) studied with teachers including César Thomson and Eusebius Mandyczewski.
- Milton Adolphus (1913–1988)
- Samuel Barber [pupils] (1910–1981)
- David Barnett
- Leonard Bernstein [pupils]
- Marc Blitzstein
- Carl Bricken
- Lukas Foss [pupils] (1922–2009)
- Max Helfman (1900–1963)
- Muriel Hodge
- David N. Johnson [pupils] (1922–1987)
- Leonard Gregory Kastle
- Roland Leich (1911–1995)
- Gian Carlo Menotti [pupils] (1911–2007)
- George Rochberg [pupils] (1918–2005)
- Ned Rorem [pupils] (b. 1923)
- Nino Rota (1911–1979)
- Rolf C. Scheurer (1918-2006)
- Rudolph Schirmer [pupils] (1919-2000)
- Virgil Thomson [pupils] (1896-1989)
- George Theophilus Walker (born 1922)
- Mary Watson Weaver [pupils] (1903–1990)
- Hugo Weisgall [pupils] (1912–1997)
- Luigi Zaninelli (born 1932)

=== Vincenzo Scaramuzza ===
this teacher's teachers
Scaramuzza (1885–1968) studied with teachers including Beniamino Cesi, Alessandro Longo, and Florestano Rossomandi.
- Martha Argerich
- Bruno Leonardo Gelber
- Mauricio Kagel [pupils]
- Sylvia Kersenbaum [pupils]
- Daniel Levy
- Atilio Stampone

=== Alessandro Scarlatti ===
this teacher's teachers
Scarlatti (1660–1725) studied with teachers including Giacomo Carissimi.
- Gaetano Carpani [pupils]
- Carlo Cotumacci [pupils]
- Francesco Durante [pupils]
- Francesco Geminiani [pupils]
- Johann Adolph Hasse [pupils]
- Nicola Logroscino
- Johann Joachim Quantz [pupils]
- Domenico Scarlatti [pupils]
- Domenico Zipoli

=== Domenico Scarlatti ===
this teacher's teachers
1660 – 1725 studied with teachers including Alessandro Scarlatti.
- Princess Maria Barbara of Portugal

=== Bogusław Schaeffer ===
- Konstancja Kochaniec

=== Pierre Schaeffer ===
- Joanna Bruzdowicz
- Denis Dufour
- Ivo Malec
- Éliane Radigue
- Annette Vande Gorne

=== Christoph Schaffrath ===
- August Kohn

=== Philipp Scharwenka ===
this teacher's teachers
P. Scharwenka (1847–1917) studied with teachers including Heinrich Dorn and Richard Wüerst.
- Tor Aulin
- Oskar Fried
- Otto Klemperer
- Edmund Severn
- José Vianna da Motta

=== Xaver Scharwenka ===
this teacher's teachers
X. Scharwenka (1850–1924) studied with teachers including Theodor Kullak.
- Fridtjof Backer-Grøndahl
- Edna Gockel-Gussen
- Benjamin Guckenberger
- Selmar Janson
- José Vianna da Motta

=== Heinrich Scheidemann ===
this teacher's teachers
Scheidemann (1595–1663) studied with teachers including Jan Pieterszoon Sweelinck.
- Werner Fabricius [pupils]
- Johann Adam Reincken [pupils]
- Matthias Weckmann

=== Johann Schelle ===
this teacher's teachers
Schelle (1648–1701) studied with teachers including Heinrich Schütz.
- Johann Friedrich Fasch [pupils]
- Christoph Graupner
- Johann David Heinichen [pupils]
- Johann Theodor Roemhildt [pupils]

=== Johann Baptist Schenk ===
- Ludwig van Beethoven [pupils]

=== Heinrich Schenker ===
this teacher's teachers
Schenker (1868–1935) studied with teachers including Johann Nepomuk Fuchs.
- Wilhelm Furtwangler
- Anthony van Hoboken
- Oswald Jonas
- Paul von Klenau
- Franz Mittler
- Reinhard Oppel
- Felix Salzer [pupils]
- Hans Weisse [pupils]

=== Hermann Scherchen ===
this teacher's teachers
Scherchen (1891–1966) studied with teachers including unknown .
- Karel Ančerl
- Marc Bélanger [pupils]
- Frieda Belinfante
- Françoys Bernier
- Hilda Dianda
- Karl Amadeus Hartmann
- Egisto Macchi
- Bruno Maderna [pupils]
- Luigi Nono [pupils]
- Anna Renfer
- Francis Travis

=== Arnold Schering ===
this teacher's teachers
Schering (1877–1941) studied with teachers including Joseph Joachim and Hermann Kretzschmar.
- Hans Mersmann [pupils]

=== Johann Gottfried Schicht ===
- August Ferdinand Anacker [pupils]
- Carl Ferdinand Becker
- Carl Gottlieb Reissiger
- Johann Philipp Christian Schulz
- Carl Friedrich Zöllner [pupils]

=== Poul Schierbeck ===
this teacher's teachers
Schierbeck (1888–1949) studied with teachers including Carl Nielsen.
- Jørgen Jersild (1913–2004)
- Leif Kayser (1919–2001)
- Leif Thybo (1922–2001)

=== Adolf Schiffer ===
this teacher's teachers
Schiffer (1873-1950) studied with teachers including David Popper.
- Paul Abraham
- Gábor Rejtő
- Mátyás Seiber [pupils]
- János Starker
- Laszlo Varga

=== Madeline Schiller ===
this teacher's teachers
Schiller 1843-1911 studied with teachers including Charles Hallé, Julius Benedict, and Ignaz Moscheles.
- Harvey Worthington Loomis

=== Joseph Schillinger ===
- Mel Powell [pupils]

=== Max von Schillings ===
this teacher's teachers
Schillings (1868–1933) studied with teachers including Josef Rheinberger.
- Wilhelm Furtwängler
- Paul von Klenau

=== Anton Schindler ===
- Franz Wüllner [pupils]

=== Philipp Schindlöker ===
- Joseph Merk

=== Victor Schiøler ===
this teacher's teachers
Schiøler (1899–1967) studied with teachers including Ignaz Friedman and Artur Schnabel.
- Victor Borge
- Gunnar Johansen

=== Karl Schiske ===
this teacher's teachers
Schiske (1916–1969) studied with teachers including Ernst Kanitz.
- Charles Boone
- Iván Erőd
- Luca Lombardi
- Gösta Neuwirth
- Kurt Schwertsik
- Erich Urbanner
- Norma Wendelburg
- Ramon Zupko
- Otto M. Zykan

=== Franz Schmidt ===
this teacher's teachers
Schmidt (1874-1939) studied with teachers including Anton Bruckner, Robert Fuchs, Ferdinand Hellmesberger, Theodor Leschetizky, and Felizian Josef Moczik.
- Theodor Berger
- Walter Bricht
- Ľudovít Rajter
- Alfred Rosé
- Marcel Rubin
- Alfred Uhl
- Friedrich Wührer
- Leo Wurmser

=== Henry Schmidt ===
- William Mason [pupils]

=== Aloys Schmitt ===
this teacher's teachers
Schmitt (1788–1866) studied with teachers including Johann Anton André.
- Carl Almenräder
- Heinrich Henkel [pupils]
- Ferdinand Hiller [pupils]
- Edward Hugh Lindsay Sloper
- Karl Wilhelm

=== Hans Schmitt ===
- Ilona Eibenschütz
- Alexander Raab [pupils]
- Artur Schnabel [pupils]

=== Artur Schnabel ===
this teacher's teachers
Schnabel (1882–1951) studied with teachers including Theodor Leschetizky, Hans Schmitt, and Anna Yesipova.
- Adrian Aeschbacher
- Victor Babin
- Jeanne Bamberger
- Stefan Bardas
- Alan Bush
- Maria Curcio [pupils]
- Clifford Curzon [pupils]
- Rudolf Firkušný [pupils]
- Leon Fleisher
- Claude Frank
- Frank Glazer
- Boris Goldovsky [pupils]
- Karl Haas
- Henry Jolles
- Lili Kraus
- Waldemar Liachowsky
- Adele Marcus
- Noel Mewton-Wood
- Eunice Norton
- Jesús Maria Sanromá
- Victor Schiøler [pupils]
- Leonard Shure [pupils]
- Ruth Slenczynska
- Jascha Spivakovsky
- Kwong-Kwong Tung [pupils]
- Aube Tzerko
- Vitya Vronsky
- Nancy Weir
- Gavin Williamson
- Konrad Wolff
- Carlo Zecchi
- Charlotte Lois Zelka

=== Dieter Schnebel ===
this teacher's teachers
Schnebel (1930–2018) studied with teachers including Theodor W. Adorno, Pierre Boulez, Eric Doflein, Ernst Krenek, and Wilhelm Siebler.
- Chaya Czernowin [pupils]

=== Friedrich Schneider ===
- Friedrich Lux
- Albert Niemann
- Gustav Rebling
- Wilhelm Rust
- Theodor Schneider
- Eduard Thiele

=== Johann Gottlob Schneider ===
- Ernst Naumann

=== Arnold Schoenberg ===
this teacher's teachers
Schoenberg (1874–1951) studied with teachers including Oskar Adler, Joseph Labor, and Alexander von Zemlinsky.
- Hans Erich Apostel
- Alban Berg [pupils]
- Marc Blitzstein
- Dave Brubeck
- John Cage [pupils]
- Jay Chernis [pupils]
- Edward Clark
- Richard Cumming
- Max Deutsch [pupils]
- Hanns Eisler
- Roberto Gerhard [pupils]
- Alexander Goehr [pupils]
- Walter Goehr [pupils]
- Norbert von Hannenheim
- Lou Harrison [pupils]
- Marij Kogoj [pupils]
- Kunihiko Hashimoto [pupils]
- Richard Hoffman
- Heinrich Jalowetz
- Hanns Jelinek [pupils]
- Eunice Katunda
- Earl Kim [pupils]
- Leon Kirchner [pupils]
- Józef Koffler
- Rudolf Kolisch
- René Leibowitz [pupils]
- Dika Newlin
- Paul Pisk [pupils]
- David Raksin
- Karl Rankl
- Jeannine Richer
- Josef Rufer [pupils]
- Alfredo Sangiorgi [pupils]
- Rudolf Serkin [pupils]
- Nikos Skalkottas
- Erwin Stein
- Leonard Stein [pupils]
- Eduard Steuermann [pupils]
- Hans Swarowsky [pupils]
- Viktor Ullmann
- Vilma von Webenau
- Anton Webern [pupils]
- Egon Wellesz [pupils]
- Winfried Zillig

=== Bernhard Scholz ===
this teacher's teachers
Scholz (1835–1916) studied with teachers including Ernst Pauer.
- Hermann Hans Wetzler [pupils]

=== Anna Eugénie Schoen-René ===
this teacher's teachers
Schoen-René (1864–1942) studied with teachers including Pauline Viardot.
- Burton V. Barnes
- Karin Branzell
- George Britton (musician)
- Kitty Carlisle
- Florence Easton
- Sonia Essin
- Mack Harrell
- Margaret Harshaw [pupils]
- Charles Kullman
- Alberta Masiello
- Jane Pickens
- Lanny Ross
- Alice Sjoselius
- Risë Stevens
- Thelma Votipka

=== Barry Schrader ===
- Anna Rubin

=== Henry Schradieck ===
this teacher's teachers
Schradieck (1846–1918) studied with teachers including Ferdinand David and Hubert Léonard.
- John Dunn (violinist)
- Ottokar Nováček
- Maud Powell
- Walter B. Rogers [pupils]
- Theodore Spiering
- Max Donner

=== Franz Schreker ===
this teacher's teachers
Schreker (1878–1934) studied with teachers including Robert Fuchs.
- Julius Bürger
- Berthold Goldschmidt
- Alois Hába [pupils]
- Jascha Horenstein
- Ernst Kanitz [pupils]
- Ernst Krenek [pupils]
- Artur Rodziński
- Karol Rathaus
- Marij Kogoj [pupils]
- Hans J. Salter
- Zdenka Ticharich
- Stefan Wolpe [pupils]
- Grete von Zieritz

=== Hermann Schroeder ===
this teacher's teachers
Schroeder (1904–1984) studied with teachers including Hermann Abendroth, Hans Bachem, Walter Braunfels, and Heinrich Lemacher.
- Karlheinz Stockhausen [pupils]

=== Johann Samuel Schroeter ===
- Elizabeth Billington

=== Christoph Gottlieb Schröter ===
- Charles Frederick Horn [pupils]

=== Edmund Schuëcker ===
this teacher's teachers
Schuëcker (1860–1911) studied with teachers including Antonio Zamara.
- Myrtle Hart
- Johannes Snoer

=== Julius Schulhoff ===
this teacher's teachers
Schulhoff (1825–1898) studied with teachers including Ignaz Amadeus Tedesco and Václav Tomášek.
- Édouard Lalo

=== Gunther Schuller ===
this teacher's teachers
Schuller (born 1925) studied with teachers including Eduard Steuermann.
- Simon Bainbridge [pupils]
- Michael Carnes
- Riccardo Dalli Cardillo
- Charles Dodge
- Mohammed Fairouz
- John Ferritto
- Anthony Gilbert [pupils]
- Oliver Knussen [pupils]
- Barbara Kolb
- Steve Martland
- Ralph Patt
- Irwin Swack
- Mark-Anthony Turnage [pupils]
- Nancy Zeltzman

=== Johann Abraham Peter Schulz ===
this teacher's teachers
Schulz (1747–1800) studied with teachers including Johann Kirnberger.
- John Samuel Charles Possin [pupils]
- Karl Bernhard Wessely
- Christoph Ernst Friedrich Weyse

=== William Schuman ===
this teacher's teachers
Schuman (1910–1992) studied with teachers including Roy Harris.
- Seymour Shifrin [pupils]

=== Clara Schumann ===
this teacher's teachers
C. Schumann (1819–1896) studied with teachers including Christian Theodor Weinlig and Friedrich Wieck.
- Fanny Davies
- John Arthur St. Oswald Dykes [pupils]
- Carl Friedberg [pupils]
- Luise Adolpha Le Beau
- Adine O'Neill
- Franklin Taylor [pupils]
- Hermann Hans Wetzler
- Mathilde Verne [pupils]

=== Robert Schumann ===
this teacher's teachers
R. Schumann (1810–1856) studied with teachers including Heinrich Dorn and Friedrich Wieck.
- Albert Dietrich
- Carl Reinecke [pupils]

=== Ignaz Schuppanzigh ===
- Ludwig van Beethoven [pupils]
- Joseph Mayseder [pupils]
- Franz Pecháček

=== Heinrich Schütz ===
this teacher's teachers
Schütz (1585–1672) studied with teachers including Giovanni Gabrieli.

Heinrich Schütz, often called the "father of German music", composer of what is traditionally regarded as the "first German opera" Dafne (1627, lost), and transmitter of the Italian style of his teacher Giovanni Gabrieli to Germany had many pupils, including many of the musicians who sang or played under him as Kapellmeister in composition.

- Heinrich Albert, Schütz' cousin
- Christoph Bernhard
- Giovanni Andrea Bontempi
- Anton Colander, childhood friend of Schütz
- Princess Elisabeth Sophie of Mecklenburg
- Carlo Farina
- Johann Wilhelm Furchheim
- Johann Kaspar Horn
- Caspar Kittel
- Christoph Kittel
- Johann Klemm
- Adam Krieger
- Johann Jacob Löwe
- Gabriel Möhlich
- Johann Nauwach
- David Pohle
- Johann Schelle [pupils]
- Johann Theile [pupils]
- Clemens Thieme
- Johann Vierdanck
- Matthias Weckmann
- Friedrich Werner
- Friedrich von Westhoff, father of:
- Johann Paul von Westhoff

=== Joseph Schwantner ===
this teacher's teachers
Schwantner (born 1943) studied with teachers including Alan Stout.
- Martin Amlin
- Roger Briggs
- Eric Ewazen
- Daron Hagen
- Yoshihisa Hirano
- Kamran Ince
- Daniel Kellogg
- Joseph Lukasik
- Marc Mellits
- Carter Pann
- Robert Paterson
- Joseph Pehrson
- Kevin Puts
- Paul Reller
- D. J. Sparr
- Gordon Stout
- Christopher Theofanidis
- Michael Sidney Timpson
- Michael Torke
- Ye Xiaogang
- Evan Ziporyn

=== Rudolf Schwarz ===
this teacher's teachers
Schwarz (1905–1994) studied with teachers including Hans Gál, Richard Robert, and Richard Strauss.
- Christopher Whelen

=== Heinrich Schwemmer ===
this teacher's teachers
Schwemmer (1621–1696) studied with teachers including Johann Erasmus Kindermann.
- Nikolaus Deinl
- Johann Krieger
- Johann Löhner
- Johann Pachelbel [pupils]
- J. B. Schütz
- Maximilian Zeidler

=== Christian Friedrich Gottlieb Schwenke ===
this teacher's teachers
Schwenke (1767–1822) studied with teachers including Carl Philipp Emanuel Bach and Johann Kirnberger.
- Friedrich Kuhlau

=== Salvatore Sciarrino ===
- Pierluigi Billone
- Francesco Filidei
- David Monacchi
- Maurizio Pisati
- Lucia Ronchetti

=== Peter Sculthorpe ===
this teacher's teachers
Sculthorpe (1929–2014) studied with teachers including Egon Wellesz.
- Barry Conyngham
- Mark Isaacs
- Gillian Whitehead

=== Else Schmitz-Gohr ===
this teacher's teachers
Schmitz-Gohr (1901–1987) studied with teachers including Franz Bolsche, Wilhelm Klatte, Otto Klauwell, James Kwast, and Fritz Hans Rehbold.
- York Höller [pupils]
- Bernhard Klee
- Erika Radermacher

=== Friedrich Schwindl ===
- Johann August Just

=== Gregorio Sciroli ===
- Giuseppe Aprile [pupils]

=== Alexander Scriabin ===
this teacher's teachers
Scriabin (1872–1915) studied with teachers including Anton Arensky, Georgi Conus, Vasily Safonov, Alexander Siloti, Sergei Taneyev, and Nikolai Zverev.
- Alfred La Liberté [pupils]
- Djane Lavoie-Herz [pupils]

=== Humphrey Searle ===
this teacher's teachers
Searle (1915–1982) studied with teachers including Anton Webern.
- Hugh Davidson
- Brian Elias [pupils]
- Michael Finnissy
- David Gompper
- Alistair Hinton
- Geoffrey King
- Graham Newcater

=== Simon Sechter ===
this teacher's teachers
Sechter (1788–1867) studied with teachers including Leopold Koželuch.
- Anton Bruckner [pupils]
- Theodor Döhler [pupils]
- Anton Door [pupils]
- Johann Nepomuk Fuchs [pupils]
- Adolf von Henselt [pupils]
- Béla Kéler
- Louis Köhler [pupils]
- Antoine de Kontski [pupils]
- Franz Lachner [pupils]
- Ferdinand Laub [pupils]
- Theodor Leschetizky [pupils]
- Eduard Marxsen
- Gustav Nottebohm [pupils]
- Karl Ferdinand Pohl
- Gottfried von Preyer [pupils]
- Eduard Rappoldi
- Kornelije Stanković
- Sigismond Thalberg [pupils]
- Karl Umlauf
- Henri Vieuxtemps [pupils]
- Antonio Zamara [pupils]

=== Jan Sedivka ===
this teacher's teachers
Sedivka (1917–2009) studied with teachers including Otakar Ševčík.
- Jonathan Allen
- Philippe Borer
- Pamela Bryce
- Keith Crellin
- John Curro
- Lyndal Edmiston
- Peter Exton
- Karel Janovický
- Theodore Lazaroff
- Elizabeth Morgan
- Marina Phillips
- Uto Ughi
- Ding Zhinuo [pupils]
- Romana Zieglerová

=== William Charles Ernest Seeboeck ===
this teacher's teachers
Seeboeck (1859—1907) studied with teachers including Johannes Brahms, Gustav Nottebohm, and Anton Rubinstein.
- John Alden Carpenter
- Blanche Robinson

=== Charles Seeger ===
- Johanna Beyer
- Henry Cowell [pupils]
- Akin Euba
- Ruth Crawford Seeger [pupils]

=== Josef Seger ===
this teacher's teachers
Seger (1716–1782) studied with teachers including Felix Benda, Bohuslav Matěj Černohorský, František Tůma, and Jan Zach.
- Karel Blažej Kopřiva
- Jan Antonín Koželuh
- Jan Křtitel Kuchař
- Josef Mysliveček [pupils]

=== Andrés Segovia ===
- Lily Afshar
- Liona Boyd
- Julian Bream
- Charlie Byrd
- Abel Carlevaro [pupils]
- Michael Chapdelaine
- Alirio Diaz
- Eliot Fisk
- Oscar Ghiglia
- Eric Henderson
- Michael Laucke
- Antonio Membrado
- Christopher Parkening
- John Williams [pupils]

=== Mátyás Seiber ===
this teacher's teachers
Seiber (1905–1960) studied with teachers including Zoltán Kodály and Adolf Schiffer.
- Raymond Baervoets
- Don Banks
- Hinner Bauch
- Francis Chagrin
- Peter Crossley-Holland
- Malcolm Forsyth
- Peter Racine Fricker [pupils]
- Alan Gibbs
- Anthony Gilbert
- Stanley Glasser
- Michael Graubart
- Barry Gray
- Wilfred Heaton
- Karel Janovický
- Ingvar Lidholm
- Malcolm Lipkin
- David Lumsdaine
- John Mayer
- Anthony Milner [pupils]
- Angela Morley
- Herman Roelstraete
- Max Rostal
- Francis Routh
- Peter Schat
- Fjölnir Stefánsson
- Hugh Wood [pupils]
- Angela Morley

=== Waldemar Seidel ===
- Don Banks
- Phyllis Batchelor
- Glen Carter-Varney
- May Clifford
- Douglas Gamley
- Peggy Glanville-Hicks
- Bernice Lehmann
- Noel Mewton-Wood
- Margaret Schofield

=== Isidor Seiss ===
this teacher's teachers
Seiss studied with teachers including Moritz Hauptmann and Friedrich Wieck.
- Volkmar Andreae [pupils]
- Frederick Corder [pupils]
- Engelbert Humperdinck [pupils]
- Karl Krill
- Carl Lachmund
- Maurits Leefson
- Willem Mengelberg
- Elly Ney
- Alfred Sittard
- Henri Weil

=== Bernhard Sekles ===
- Theodor W. Adorno
- Ottmar Gerster
- Hermann Heiss
- Paul Hindemith [pupils]
- Anthony van Hoboken
- Erich Itor Kahn
- Max Kowalski
- Hans Rosbaud
- Max Rudolf
- Cyril Scott
- Erich Schmid
- Rudi Stephan

=== Thomas Selle ===
- Werner Fabricius [pupils]

=== Phyllis Sellick ===
this teacher's teachers
Sellick studied with teachers including Isidor Philipp and Cuthbert Whitemore.
- Steven Worbey

=== Marcella Sembrich ===
this teacher's teachers
Sembrich studied with teachers including Giovanni Battista Lamperti, Joseph Hellmesberger Sr, and Julius Epstein (pianist).
- Josephine Antoine
- Natalie Bodanya
- Edna de Lima
- Annamary Dickey
- Dusolina Giannini
- Alma Gluck
- Florence Kimball [pupils]
- Hulda Lashanska
- Queena Mario
- Nancy McCord
- Jane Pickens
- Polyna Stoska

=== Daria Semegen ===
this teacher's teachers
Semegen studied with teachers including Samuel Adler, Bülent Arel, Alexander Goehr, Włodzimierz Kotoński, Witold Lutosławski, Burrill Phillips, and Vladimir Ussachevsky.
- Anne LeBaron

=== Blanche Selva ===
- Jean Witkowski [pupils]
- Emiliana de Zubeldía [pupils]
- Montserrat Campmany i Cortés

=== Tullio Serafin ===
- Jerzy Semkow

=== Rudolf Serkin ===
this teacher's teachers
Serkin (1903-1991) studied with teachers including Richard Robert, Joseph Marx, Arnold Schoenberg, and Richard Stöhr.
- Paul Berkowitz
- Yefim Bronfman
- Richard Goode
- Gary Graffman
- Steven De Groote
- Paul Gulda
- Wu Han
- Michael Houstoun
- Eugene Istomin
- Aglaia Koras
- Anton Kuerti
- Ruth Laredo
- Theodore Lettvin
- James Levine
- Cecile Licad
- Seymour Lipkin
- Lee Luvisi
- Hephzibah Menuhin
- Yaltah Menuhin
- Cristina Ortiz
- Murray Perahia
- Cynthia Raim
- Adrian Ruiz
- André-Michel Schub
- Peter Serkin
- Jeremy Sieppman
- Claudette Sorel
- Susan Starr
- George Theophilus Walker
- Dika Newlin

=== Paolo Serrao ===
this teacher's teachers
Serrao (1830–1907) studied with teachers including Carlo Conti, Francesco Lanza, Saverio Mercadante, and Gennaro Parisi.
- Franco Alfano
- Francesco Cilea
- Luigi Denza
- Michele Esposito
- Umberto Giordano
- Alessandro Longo [pupils]
- Giuseppe Martucci
- Leopoldo Mugnone

=== John Serry Sr. ===
this teacher's teachers
Serry Sr. (1915–2003) studied with teachers including Robert Strassburg, Joseph Rossi, Albert Rizzi, and Gene Von Hallberg.
- Robert Davine [pupils]
- Michael Torello
- Roy Appey

=== Stanisław Serwaczyński ===
this teacher's teachers
Serwaczyński (1790-1859) studied with teachers including Jan Barcicki and Michal Serwaczyński.
- Joseph Joachim [pupils]
- Henryk Wieniawski [pupils]

=== Roger Sessions ===
this teacher's teachers
Sessions studied with teachers including Ernest Bloch, Edward Burlingame Hill, and Horatio Parker.
- John Adams
- Milton Babbitt [pupils]
- Jack Behrens
- Elmer Bernstein
- Robert Black
- Benjamin Boretz [pupils]
- Mark Brunswick
- Robert Ceely
- Robert Cogan
- Edward T. Cone [pupils]
- Paul Cooper [pupils]
- Richard Cumming
- Sir Peter Maxwell Davies [pupils]
- David Del Tredici
- David Diamond [pupils]
- Edwin Dugger
- John Eaton [pupils]
- David Epstein
- Robert Erickson [pupils]
- Ross Lee Finney [pupils]
- Alan Fletcher
- Kenneth Frazelle
- Carlton Gamer
- Steven Gellman
- Miriam Gideon
- John Harbison [pupils]
- Walter Hekster
- Robert Helps
- Lejaren Hiller [pupils]
- Sydney Hodkinson [pupils]
- Andrew Imbrie [pupils]
- Grant Johannesen
- Earl Kim [pupils]
- Leon Kirchner [pupils]
- Jonathan Kramer [pupils]
- Emanuel Leplin
- Fred Lerdahl [pupils]
- David Lewin [pupils]
- Donald Martino
- Richard Maxfield [pupils]
- William Mayer
- Charles Mills
- Conlon Nancarrow
- Dika Newlin
- Roger Nixon
- Will Ogdon
- Claire Polin
- Stephen Pruslin
- Einojuhani Rautavaara
- Leonard Rosenman
- Frederic Rzewski
- Eric Salzman
- William Schimmel
- Richard St. Clair
- Michiko Toyama
- Roland Trogan
- Richard Aaker Trythall
- George Tsontakis
- John Veale
- Henry Weinberg
- Hugo Weisgall [pupils]
- Peter Westergaard [pupils]
- Beatrice Witkin
- Rolv Yttrehus
- Ellen Taaffe Zwilich

=== Giacomo Setaccioli ===
this teacher's teachers
Setaccioli (1868–1925) studied with teachers including Cesare de Sanctis and Filippo Franceschini.
- Vincenzo di Donato [pupils]
- Vittorio Gui
- Newton Pádua

=== Mordecai Seter ===
this teacher's teachers
Seter (1916–1994) studied with teachers including Nadia Boulanger, Paul Dukas, and Igor Stravinsky.
- Chaya Czernowin [pupils]

=== Otakar Ševčík ===
this teacher's teachers
Ševčík (1852–1934) studied with teachers including Antonín Bennewitz and Hans Sitt.
- Edith A'Vard
- Cesare Barison
- Petrowitsch Bissing
- Vivien Chartres
- Giuliana Diodati
- Jack Albert Fracht
- Mano Granchi
- Marie Hall
- Marjorie Hayward
- Fritz Hirt
- Václav Huml
- Maxim Jacobsen
- Daisy Kennedy
- Jaroslav Kocián
- Victor Kolar
- Rudolf Kolisch
- Hugo Kortschak
- Ivan Kryzhanovsky
- Jan Kubelík
- Erika Morini
- Viktor Nopp
- Emanuel Ondříček
- Silvestre Revueltas
- Alma Rosé
- Peter Rybar
- Leon Sametini [pupils]
- Konstantin Saradzhev [pupils]
- Wolfgang Schneiderhan
- Wilibald Schweyda
- Jan Sedivka
- Vilem Sokol
- Herma Studeny
- Robert Trebini
- Eugenia Umińska
- Henriette Wieniawski
- Scott Willits
- Efrem Zimbalist

=== Ignaz von Seyfried ===
this teacher's teachers
Seyfried (1776–1841) studied with teachers including Johann Georg Albrechtsberger and Wolfgang Amadeus Mozart.
- Antonio Casimir Cartellieri
- Heinrich Wilhelm Ernst
- Joseph Fischhof [pupils]
- Louis Köhler [pupils]
- Franz Krenn [pupils]
- Eduard Marxsen [pupils]
- Franz von Suppé

=== Giovanni Sgambati ===
this teacher's teachers
Sgambati (1841–1914) studied with teachers including Franz Liszt.

Mary Barratt Due

- Lucia Contini Anselmi
- Mikhail Ivanov [pupils]
- Augusta Mary Wakefield

=== Ravi Shankar ===
this teacher's teachers
Shankar studied with teachers including Allauddin Khan and Ali Akbar Khan.
- Krishna Bhatt
- Tarun Bhattacharya
- Peter Walker

=== Harold Shapero ===
this teacher's teachers
Shapero studied with teachers including Nadia Boulanger, Paul Hindemith, Ernst Krenek, Walter Piston, and Nicolas Slonimsky.
- John Adams
- Gustav Ciamaga
- Alvin Lucier [pupils]
- Joel Mandelbaum
- Sheila Silver
- Richard Wernick [pupils]
- Scott Wheeler

=== Harvey Shapiro ===
- Diane Chaplin
- Charles Curtis
- Amanda Forsyth
- Joshua Gordon
- Clancy Newman
- Inbal Segev
- Jeremy Turner

=== Yuri Shaporin ===
- Eduard Artemyev
- Tatyana Chudova [pupils]
- Rodion Shchedrin

=== Herbert Sharpe ===
this teacher's teachers
Sharpe (1861–1925) studied with teachers including John Francis Barnett, Frederick Bridge, Ebenezer Prout, and Arthur Sullivan.
- Basil Allchin [pupils]
- Harold Darke [pupils]
- Kathleen Long [pupils]
- Ralph Vaughan Williams [pupils]

=== Vissarion Shebalin ===
this teacher's teachers
Shebalin studied with teachers including Nikolai Myaskovsky.
- Lydia Auster
- Edison Denisov [pupils]
- Grigory Frid
- Sofia Gubaidulina
- Nikolai Karetnikov
- Karen Khachaturian
- Tikhon Khrennikov [pupils]
- Aleksandra Pakhmutova

=== Jessie Shefrin ===
- Andrew Deutsch

=== Harry Rowe Shelley ===
this teacher's teachers
Shelley (1858–1947) studied with teachers including Dudley Buck, Antonín Dvořák, and Gustave J. Stoeckel.
- Anna Alice Chapin
- Charles Ives
- Charles Sanford Skilton

=== Bright Sheng ===
this teacher's teachers
Sheng studied with teachers including Leonard Bernstein and George Perle.
- Lembit Beecher [pupils]
- Bret Bohman [pupils]
- Joseph R. Bozich [pupils]
- Matthew Bridgham [pupils]
- Paul Dooley [pupils]
- Michael Djupstrom [pupils]
- Stephen Eddins [pupils]
- Recep Gul [pupils]
- Iman Habibi [pupils]
- Ching-chu Hu [pupils]
- Takuma Itoh [pupils]
- Daniel J. Knaggs [pupils]
- James Lee, III [pupils]
- Payton MacDonald [pupils]
- David Maki [pupils]
- Carter Pann [pupils]
- Jules Pegram [pupils]
- Joel Puckett [pupils]
- Andrea Reinkemeyer [pupils]
- Brandon Scott Rumsey [pupils]
- Yaniv Segal [pupils]
- Michael Schachter [pupils]
- Garrett Schumann [pupils]
- Steven Simpson [pupils]
- Matthew Tommasini [pupils]

=== Roy Shepherd ===
- Helen Gifford
- Bruce Hungerford
- Alan Kogosowski
- George Logie-Smith
- Ian Munro
- Victor Sangiorgio
- James Helme Sutcliffe
- Warren Thomson

=== Robert Sherlaw Johnson ===
this teacher's teachers
Sherlaw Johnson studied with teachers including Nadia Boulanger, Jacques Février, and Olivier Messiaen.
- Robert Saxton [pupils]

Kanichi Shimofusa

- Kikuko Kanai

=== Sukeyasu Shiba ===
- Christopher Yohmei Blasdel
- Lois V Vierk

=== Seymour Shifrin ===
this teacher's teachers
Shifrin (1926–1979) studied with teachers including Otto Luening, Darius Milhaud, and William Schuman.
- Larry Austin [pupils]
- Elaine Barkin
- Peter Child
- James Dashow
- David Del Tredici [pupils]
- Tamar Diesendruck [pupils]
- Janice Hamer [pupils]
- Jonathan Kramer [pupils]
- Ned Lagin
- Nicola LeFanu [pupils]
- Ray Loring
- Michael Lowenstern
- John McGuire
- Marjorie Merriman [pupils]
- Henry Mollicone
- Pauline Oliveros [pupils]
- Terry Riley [pupils]
- Loren Rush
- Allen Shearer
- Sheila Silver
- Joel Eric Suben
- Donald Sur
- Peter K. Winkler
- La Monte Young [pupils]

=== Nelli Shkolnikova ===
- Yuriy Bekker

=== Verdina Shlonsky ===
this teacher's teachers
Shlonsky (1905–1990) studied with teachers including Nadia Boulanger, Edgard Varese, Max Deutsch, Artur Schnabel, and Egon Petry.
- Benjamin Pearl
- Mira Zakai [pupils]

=== Bernard Shore ===
this teacher's teachers
Shore (1896–1985) studied with teachers including Walter Galpin Alcock, Arthur Bent, Adolf Borsdorf, Thomas Dunhill, and Lionel Tertis.
- Roger Chase

=== Dmitri Shostakovich ===
this teacher's teachers
Shostakovich (1906–1975) studied with teachers including Alexander Glazunov, Nikolai Malko, Leonid Nikolayev, Alexander Ossovsky, Elena Rozanova, Nikolay Sokolov, and Maximilian Steinberg.
- German Galynin
- Galina Ustvolskaya [pupils]
- Elmira Nazirova [pupils]
- Georgy Sviridov

=== Leonard Shure ===
this teacher's teachers
Shure (1910–1995) studied with teachers including Artur Schnabel.
- William Appling [pupils]
- Gilbert Kalish [pupils]
- Beth Levin [pupils]
- Ursula Oppens [pupils]
- James K. Randall [pupils]
- Mark Richman [pupils]
- Jerome Rose [pupils]
- Barbara Shearer [pupils]
- Claudia Stevens [pupils]

=== Boris Sibor ===
- Grigori Gamburg
- Konstantin Mostras [pupils]

=== Jean Sibelius ===
this teacher's teachers
Sibelius (1865–1957) studied with teachers including Martin Wegelius, Ferruccio Busoni, Robert Fuchs, Arnold Becker, and Karl Goldmark.
- Bengt de Törne
- Toivo Kuula
- Leevi Madetoja

=== Balthasar Siberer ===
- Johann Ernst Eberlin [pupils]
- Leopold Mozart [pupils]

=== Honorio Siccardi ===
this teacher's teachers
Siccardi (1897–1963) studied with teachers including Felipe Boero, Pablo Berutti, Ernesto Drangosch, Gilardo Gilardi, and Gian Francesco Malipiero.
- Roberto Britos
- Washington Castro
- Hilda Dianda
- Abel Fleury
- Leopoldo Hurtado
- Manolo Juárez
- Consuelo Mallo López

=== Nikolai Sidelnikov ===
- Eduard Artemyev
- Vyacheslav Artyomov
- Vakhtang Kakhidze
- Vladimir Martynov
- Sergei Pavlenko
- Anton Rovner
- Dmitri Smirnov [pupils]
- Ivan Sokolov
- Vladimir Tarnopolsky

=== Murry Sidlin ===
- José De Eusebio (at Tanglewood)
- Lawrence Golan (at Tanglewood)
- Sasha Mäkilä (at Tanglewood)
- Tomas Netopil (at Tanglewood)
- Peter Oundjian (at Tanglewood)

=== Elie Siegmeister ===
this teacher's teachers
Siegmeister studied with teachers including Nadia Boulanger.
- Stephen Albert (Pulitzer Prize winner)
- Herbert Deutsch
- Daniel Dorff
- Naomi Drucker (clarinetist)
- Jack Gallagher (Grammy-winner)
- Leonard Lehrman
- Joseph Pehrson
- Michael Jeffrey Shapiro
- William Bradley Strickland
- Richard White

=== Roberto Sierra ===
this teacher's teachers
Sierra studied with teachers including György Ligeti.
- Robert Paterson
- Sean Shepherd
- Chris Gendall

=== Albert Siklós ===
this teacher's teachers
Siklós (1878–1942) studied with teachers including Hans von Koessler.
- Lajos Bárdos
- Ferenc Farkas [pupils]
- Lajos Kiss [pupils]
- Ferenc Szabó

=== Kazimierz Sikorski ===
this teacher's teachers
Sikorski (1895–1986) studied with teachers including Nadia Boulanger, Adolf Chybiński, and Felicjan Szopski.
- Vytautas Bacevičius
- Grażyna Bacewicz
- Tadeusz Baird
- Joanna Bruzdowicz
- Maria Dziewulska
- Jan Ekier [pupils]
- Roman Maciejewski
- Miłosz Magin
- Artur Malawski [pupils]
- Bernadetta Matuszczak
- Roman Palester
- Andrzej Panufnik
- Marian Sawa
- Kazimierz Serocki
- Hanna Skalska-Szemioth
- André Tchaikowsky

=== Alexander Siloti ===
this teacher's teachers
Siloti (1863–1945) studied with teachers including Franz Liszt, Nikolai Rubinstein, Nikolai Zverev, Sergei Taneyev, Pyotr Ilyich Tchaikovsky, and Nikolai Hubert.
- Alexander Gretchaninov
- Sergei Rachmaninoff [pupils]
- Alexander Scriabin [pupils]

=== Jean-Henri Simon ===
this teacher's teachers
Simon (1783–1861) studied with teachers including Charles-Simon Catel and François-Joseph Gossec.
- Lambert Joseph Meerts
- Henri Vieuxtemps [pupils]

=== Matteo Simonelli ===
this teacher's teachers
Simonelli (1618-1696) studied with teachers including Vincenzo Giovannoni and Virgilio Mazzocchi.
- Giovanni Maria Casini [pupils]
- Arcangelo Corelli [pupils]

=== Giuseppe Simoni ===
- Antonio Salieri [pupils]

=== Gardell Simons ===
- Emory Remington

=== Roman Simovych ===
- Mark Kopytman [pupils]
- Myroslav Skoryk [pupils]

=== Leonid Sintsev ===
- Clara Peya [pupils]
- Rafael Salinas [pupils]

=== Hans Sitt ===
this teacher's teachers
Sitt (1850–1922) studied with teachers including Antonín Bennewitz, Johann Friedrich Kittl, and Josef Krejčí.
- Franco Alfano
- Fritz Brase
- Frederick Delius
- Hermann Grabner [pupils]
- Frederick E. Hahn
- Otakar Ševčík [pupils]
- Pablo Sorozábal
- Václav Talich

=== Myroslav Skoryk ===
this teacher's teachers
Skoryk (1938–2020) studied with teachers including Dmitry Kabalevsky, Mykola Kolessa, Stanyslav Lyudkevych, Roman Simovych, and Adam Sołtys.
- Osvaldas Balakauskas
- Ivan Karabyts
- Yevhen Stankovych

=== František Zdeněk Skuherský ===
- Josef Bohuslav Foerster [pupils]
- Leoš Janáček [pupils]

=== Ruth Slenczynska ===
this teacher's teachers
Slenczynska studied with teachers including Sergei Rachmaninoff, Artur Schnabel, Egon Petri, Alfred Cortot, and Josef Hofmann.
- André von Frasunkiewicz [pupils]

=== Nicolas Slonimsky ===
- Chou Wen-chung
- Harold Shapero [pupils]

=== Dmitri Smirnov ===
- Robin Haigh
- Elena Langer

=== Cyril Smith ===
this teacher's teachers
studied with teachers including Herbert Fryer.
- John Barstow
- Margaret Fingerhut
- Patrick Flynn
- Eric Harrison
- Joan Havill
- David Helfgott
- Peter Hill
- Antony Hopkins
- Niel Immelman
- Iris Loveridge
- Thalia Myers
- Stephen Savage
- Kathron Sturrock
- Fanny Waterman
- Gillian Weir

=== Leland Smith ===
- William Bolcom
- David Lang

=== Leo Smith ===
- Louis Applebaum
- Gerald Bales
- John Beckwith
- Keith Bissell
- Howard Brown
- Glenn Gould
- Kenneth Peacock
- John Weinzweig [pupils]

=== Alfredo Soffredini ===
- Pietro Mascagni

=== Josep Soler i Sardà ===
- Anna Eulàlia Cazurra i Basté

=== Harvey Sollberger ===
this teacher's teachers
Sollberger studied with teachers including Jack Beeson and Otto Luening.
- Cindy Cox
- Andrey Kasparov
- Peter Lieberson

=== Solomon ===
(For Solomon, see Solomon Cutner)

=== Yonty Solomon ===
this teacher's teachers
Solomon (1937–2008) studied with teachers including Guido Agosti, Myra Hess, Charles Rosen, and Kendall Taylor.
- Nick van Bloss
- Steven Worbey

=== Nicolai Soloviev ===
this teacher's teachers
Soloviev (1846–1916) studied with teachers including Nikolai Zaremba.
- Leokadiya Kashperova
- Artur Lemba
- Mihkel Lüdig
- Samuel Maykapar
- Peeter Süda
- Alexander Nikolaievitch Vinogradsky

=== Adam Sołtys ===
this teacher's teachers
Soltys (1890–1968) studied with teachers including Robert Kahn and Johannes Wolf.
- Myroslav Skoryk [pupils]
- Yevhen Stankovych

=== Giovanni Battista Somis ===
this teacher's teachers
Somis (1686–1763) studied with teachers including Arcangelo Corelli.
- Felice Giardini
- Louis-Gabriel Guillemain
- Jean-Marie Leclair [pupils]
- Gaetano Pugnani [pupils]

=== Enrique Soro ===
- Domingo Santa Cruz [pupils]

=== Leo Sowerby ===
- Robert Beadell [pupils]
- Paul Callaway
- Edwin R. Fissinger
- Gail Kubik
- Dee Libbey
- Norman Luboff
- Michael McCabe
- Mahlon Merrick (Jack Benny's longtime music director)
- Florence Price
- Helen Roessing
- Ned Rorem [pupils]
- Mildred Barnes Royse
- Irene Britton [pupils]
- David Van Vactor
- Robert Whitney

=== Mathias Spahlinger ===
- Annesley Black
- Andrew Digby
- Alan Hilario
- Johannes Kreidler
- Héctor Moro
- Andreas Stahl
- Simon Steen-Andersen
- Thomas Stiegler
- Annette Schmucki

=== John Spencer ===
this teacher's teachers
Spencer (1767–1831) studied with teachers including unknown .
- Thomas Forbes Walmisley [pupils]

=== Philipp Spitta ===
this teacher's teachers
Spitta (1841–1894) studied with teachers including unknown .
- Max Friedlaender
- Carl Krebs
- Max Seiffert
- Shohé Tanaka
- Emil Vogel
- Johannes Wolf [pupils]

=== Louis Spohr ===
this teacher's teachers
Spohr (1784–1859) studied with teachers including Lieutenant Dufour, Franz Eck, and Charles Louis Maucourt.
- Henry Blagrove
- Ferdinand David [pupils]
- Moritz Hauptmann [pupils]
- Henry Holmes
- Johann Hermann Kufferath
- Theodor Amadeus Müller
- Hubert Ries
- Hans Michael Schletterer
- Jean F. Schucht
- Frederick Tivendell
- Carl Friedrich Weitzmann [pupils]
- Frederik Thorkildsen Wexschall [pupils]

=== Johann Staden ===
- Johann Erasmus Kindermann [pupils]
- Sigmund Theophil Staden

=== Maximilian Stadler ===
- Franz Lachner [pupils]

=== John Stainer ===
this teacher's teachers
Stainer (1840–1901) studied with teachers including William Bayley, George Cooper, Frederick Ouseley, and Charles Steggall.
- Walter Galpin Alcock [pupils]
- Frederic Cliffe [pupils]
- Charles Harford Lloyd [pupils]
- Sir George Clement Martin

=== Camille-Marie Stamaty ===
this teacher's teachers
Stamaty (1811–1870) studied with teachers including Friedrich Kalkbrenner and Felix Mendelssohn.
- Louis Moreau Gottschalk [pupils]
- Charles Émile Poisot
- Camille Saint-Saëns [pupils]

=== Anton Stamitz ===
this teacher's teachers
A. Stamitz (1750 – c.1800) studied with teachers including Christian Cannabich and Johann Stamitz.
- Rodolphe Kreutzer [pupils]

=== Johann Stamitz ===
- Franz Ignaz Beck [pupils]
- Christian Cannabich [pupils]
- Wilhelm Cramer
- Anton Fils
- František Xaver Pokorný
- Anton Stamitz [pupils]
- Carl Stamitz

=== Enrico Stancabiano ===
- Spyridon Samaras

=== Charles Villiers Stanford ===
this teacher's teachers
Stanford (1852–1924) studied with teachers including Robert Prescott Stewart, Michael Quarry, Ernst Pauer, Arthur O'Leary, and Carl Reinecke.
- Basil Allchin [pupils]
- Edgar Bainton
- Marmaduke Barton [pupils]
- William Henry Bell
- Arthur Benjamin [pupils]
- Arthur Bliss
- Rutland Boughton
- Herbert Brewer [pupils]
- Frank Bridge [pupils]
- Thomas O'Brien Butler
- George Butterworth
- Clive Carey [pupils]
- Rebecca Clarke
- Samuel Coleridge-Taylor
- Harold Darke [pupils]
- Walford Davies [pupils]
- Thomas Dunhill [pupils]
- George Dyson [pupils]
- Ernest Farrar [pupils]
- Cecil Forsyth
- Herbert Fryer [pupils]
- Eugene Aynsley Goossens
- Ivor Gurney
- Leslie Heward
- Gustav Holst [pupils]
- Herbert Howells [pupils]
- Herbert Hughes
- William Hurlstone
- John Ireland [pupils]
- Gordon Jacob [pupils]
- Maurice Jacobson
- Henry Ley [pupils]
- Ernest John Moeran
- Geoffrey Molyneux Palmer
- Lloyd Powell
- Humphrey Procter-Gregg
- Cyril Rootham [pupils]
- Marion Scott
- Arthur Somervell
- Leopold Stokowski
- Freda Swain
- Frank Tapp
- Ralph Vaughan Williams [pupils]
- Stanley Herbert Wilson
- Charles Wood [pupils] (who succeeded him as professor at Cambridge)
- Haydn Wood
- Mary Wurm

=== Roman Statkowski ===
this teacher's teachers
Statkowski studied with teachers including Władysław Żeleński.
- Jan Maklakiewicz
- Piotr Perkowski
- Bolesław Szabelski [pupils]
- Apolinary Szeluto

=== Bernhard Stavenhagen ===
this teacher's teachers
Stavenhagen (1862–1914) studied with teachers including Friedrich Kiel, Franz Liszt, and Ernst Rudorff.
- Ernest Hutcheson [pupils]
- Otto Urbach

=== Joseph Anton Steffan ===
this teacher's teachers
Steffan (1726–1797) studied with teachers including Georg Christoph Wagenseil.
- Marie Antoinette
- Maria Carolina
- Joseph Diettenhofer [pupils]

=== Agostino Steffani ===
this teacher's teachers
Steffani (1654–1728) studied with teachers including Johann Caspar Kerll.
- Pietro Torri

=== Daniel Steibelt ===
- Hortense de Beauharnais

=== Eduard Stein ===
this teacher's teachers
Stein (1818–1864) studied with teachers including August Ferdinand Anacker.
- Alexander Mackenzie [pupils]

=== Leonard Stein ===
this teacher's teachers
Stein (1916–2004) studied with teachers including Arnold Schoenberg.
- John Luther Adams [pupils]
- Adrienne Albert
- Edward Auer
- David Carlson
- Gabriel Chodos
- Misha Dichter
- Dean Drummond
- Terry Jennings
- Carey Lovelace
- Leon Milo
- Stephen L. Mosko
- Jon Nakamatsu
- Rebecca Penneys
- Don Robertson
- Thomas Schultz
- Lois V. Vierk
- La Monte Young [pupils]

=== Emil Steinbach ===
- Fritz Steinbach [pupils]

=== Fritz Steinbach ===
this teacher's teachers
Steinbach (1855–1916) studied with teachers including Anton Door, Vinzenz Lachner, Gustav Nottebohm, and Emil Steinbach.
- Walter Blume
- Adolf Busch
- Fritz Busch
- Allard de Ridder [pupils]
- Karl Elmendorff
- Hans Knappertsbusch
- Franz Mittler
- Karl Aagard Østvig
- Albert van Raalte
- Erwin Schulhoff

=== Maximilian Steinberg ===
this teacher's teachers
Steinberg (1883–1946) studied with teachers including Alexander Glazunov, Anatoly Lyadov, and Nikolai Rimsky-Korsakov.
- Heino Eller [pupils]
- Gavriil Popov
- Georgi Rimski-Korsakov [pupils]
- Dmitri Shostakovich [pupils]
- Galina Ustvolskaya [pupils]
- Maria Yudina [pupils]

=== David Steinbrook ===
- Kitty Brazelton

=== Wilhelm Stenhammar ===
- Hilding Rosenberg [pupils]

=== Václav Štěpán ===
- Alice Herz-Sommer
- Marko Tajčević
- Sláva Vorlová

=== Constantin Sternberg ===
this teacher's teachers
Sternberg (1852–1924) studied with teachers including Theodor Coccius, Heinrich Dorn, Theodor Kullak, Ignaz Moscheles, and Ernst Richter.
- George Antheil [pupils]
- Robert Armbruster
- Robert Hood Bowers

=== Eduard Steuermann ===
this teacher's teachers
Steuermann studied with teachers including Ferruccio Busoni, Engelbert Humperdinck, Vilém Kurz, and Arnold Schoenberg.
- Theodor W. Adorno
- Alfred Brendel
- Irwin Freundlich
- Jakob Gimpel
- Paavo Heininen
- Lili Kraus
- David Lewin [pupils]
- Moura Lympany
- Helen Perkin
- Menahem Pressler
- Gunther Schuller [pupils]
- Russell Sherman
- Avraham Sternklar

=== Bernard Stevens ===
this teacher's teachers
Stevens (1916–1983) studied with teachers including Arthur Benjamin, Edward Joseph Dent, Gordon Jacob, Constant Lambert, R. O. Morris, and Cyril Rootham.
- John Barstow
- Keith Burstein
- Hugh Davidson
- Stephen Dodgson
- Brian Elias [pupils]
- Jean Ethridge
- Michael Finnissy
- Erika Fox
- Janetta Gould
- Kenneth V. Jones
- Peter Klatzow
- Malcolm Lipkin
- Carlo Martelli
- Peter McAleer
- Stanley Sadie
- Roderick Swanston
- John White

=== Halsey Stevens ===
this teacher's teachers
Stevens (1908-1989) studied with teachers including William Berwald and Ernest Bloch.
- Houston Bright
- Paul Cooper [pupils]
- Morten Lauridsen
- Benjamin Lees
- Charles Lloyd

=== Robert Prescott Stewart ===
this teacher's teachers
Stewart (1825–1894) studied with teachers including Richard William Beaty and John Finlayson.
- Annie Jessy Curwen
- W. H. Grattan Flood
- Vincent O'Brien [pupils]
- Margaret O'Hea
- Edith Oldham
- Annie Patterson
- Charles Villiers Stanford [pupils]
- John Millington Synge

=== Elizabeth Stirling ===
this teacher's teachers
Stirling (1819–1895) studied with teachers including Edward Holmes, W. B. Wilson, James Alexander Hamilton, and George Alexander Macfarren.
- Gordon Saunders [pupils]

=== Julius Stockhausen ===
this teacher's teachers
J. Stockhausen (1826–1906) studied with teachers including Manuel García, Jr., Charles Hallé, and Camille-Marie Stamaty.
- Max Friedlaender
- Johan Messchaert
- Karl Perron
- Lillian Sanderson
- Karl Scheidemantel
- Anton Sistermans
- Clarence Whitehill

=== Karlheinz Stockhausen ===
this teacher's teachers
Karlheinz Stockhausen (22 August 1928 – 5 December 2007) studied with teachers including Hermann Schroeder, Frank Martin, Olivier Messiaen, Darius Milhaud, and Werner Meyer-Eppler.
- David Ahern
- Liana Alexandra
- Miguel Álvarez-Fernández
- Maryanne Amacher
- Gilbert Amy
- Junsang Bahk
- Clarence Barlow
- Gerald Barry
- Mary Bauermeister
- David Behrman [pupils]
- Gillian Bibby
- Michael von Biel
- Konrad Boehmer
- Jean-Yves Bosseur
- Karl Gottfried Brunotte
- Boudewijn Buckinx
- Sylvano Bussotti
- Cornelius Cardew [pupils]
- Friedrich Cerha
- Stephen Chatman
- Aldo Clementi
- Tom Constanten
- Holger Czukay (born Holger Schüring)
- Hugh Davies
- Michel Decoust
- Jean-Claude Éloy
- Péter Eötvös
- Julio Estrada
- Johannes Fritsch
- Renaud Gagneux
- Rolf Gehlhaar
- Jacob Gilboa
- Friedrich Goldmann [pupils]
- Gérard Grisey [pupils]
- Jon Hassell
- Moya Henderson
- York Höller [pupils]
- Eleanor Hovda
- Nicolaus A. Huber
- Jean Michel Jarre
- Alden Jenks
- David C. Johnson
- Will Johnson
- Milko Kelemen [pupils]
- Jonathan Kramer [pupils]
- Helmut Lachenmann [pupils]
- André Laporte
- Mario Lavista
- Henning Lohner
- Luca Lombardi
- Robin Maconie
- Mesías Maiguashca
- Pierre Mariétan
- Tomás Marco
- Gérard Masson
- Vincent McDermott
- John McGuire
- Jenny McLeod
- Paul Méfano
- Gilberto Mendes
- Costin Miereanu
- Dary John Mizelle
- Emmanuel Nunes
- Gonzalo de Olavide
- Walter Olmo
- Jorge Peixinho
- Robert H.P. Platz
- Zoltán Pongrácz
- Horațiu Rădulescu
- Wolfgang Rihm [pupils]
- Eric Salzman
- Irmin Schmidt
- Ingo Schmitt
- Kurt Schwertsik
- Gerald Shapiro
- Makoto Shinohara
- Giuseppe Sinopoli
- Roger Smalley
- Avo Sõmer
- Tim Souster
- Ludger Stühlmeyer
- Atli Heimir Sveinsson
- Zsigmond Szathmáry
- Ivan Tcherepnin [pupils]
- Serge Tcherepnin [pupils]
- Gilles Tremblay
- George Tsontakis
- Norma Tyer
- Claude Vivier
- Kevin Volans
- Thomas Wells
- La Monte Young [pupils]
- Hans Zender

=== Gustave J. Stoeckel ===
- Harry Rowe Shelley [pupils]

=== Albert Stoessel ===
this teacher's teachers
Stoessel (1894–1943) studied with teachers including Willy Hess and Emanuel Wirth.
- Bernard Herrmann
- Robert Talbot

=== Richard Stöhr ===
this teacher's teachers
Stöhr (1874–1967) studied with teachers including Robert Fuchs and Wilhelm Rauch.
- Samuel Barber [pupils]
- Leonard Bernstein [pupils]
- Alexander Brailowsky
- Marlene Dietrich
- Lukas Foss [pupils]
- Alois Hába [pupils]
- Louis Horst
- Herbert von Karajan
- Rena Kyriakou
- Erich Leinsdorf
- Alois Melichar
- Florica Racovitză-Flondor
- Rudolf Serkin [pupils]
- Erich Zeisl

=== Richard Stoker ===
this teacher's teachers
Stoker studied with teachers including Harold Truscott, Lennox Berkeley, and Nadia Boulanger.
- Eleanor Alberga
- Irvine Arditti
- Harvey Brough
- Christopher Fox
- Joe Jackson
- Paul Patterson
- Malcolm Singer

=== Eric Stokes ===
this teacher's teachers
Stokes studied with teachers including Dominick Argento and Paul Fetler.
- Richard Marriott

=== Josip Štolcer-Slavenski ===
- Ludmila Frajt
- Ljubica Marić

=== Pyotr Stolyarsky ===
this teacher's teachers
Stolyarsky (1871–1944) studied with teachers including Stanisław Barcewicz and Emil Młynarski.
- Mikhail Fichtenholz
- Elizabeth Gilels [pupils]
- Boris Goldstein [pupils]
- Eduard Davidovich Grach [pupils]
- Jascha Heifetz [pupils]
- Nathan Milstein [pupils]
- David Oistrakh [pupils]
- Igor Oistrakh [pupils]

=== Benno Stolzenberg ===
this teacher's teachers
Stolzenberg (1827–1908) studied with teachers including Heinrich Dorn.
- Margarethe Arndt-Ober [pupils]
- Albert Reiss [pupils]

=== Jaap Stotijn ===
this teacher's teachers
Stotijn (1891–1970) studied with teachers including Dirk van Emmerik.
- Han de Vries [pupils]
- Heinz Friesen (nl:Heinz Friesen)
- Werner Herbers (nl:Werner Herbers)
- Haakon Stotijn (nl:Haakon Stotijn)
- Cees van der Kraan (nl:Cees van der Kraan)
- Koen van Slogteren (nl:Koen van Slogteren)

=== Alan Stout ===
this teacher's teachers
Stout (born 1932) studied with teachers including Henry Cowell, Vagn Holmboe, Wallingford Riegger, and John Verrall.
- Frank Ferko
- Jay Kawarsky
- Maggi Payne [pupils]
- Michael Pisaro
- Joseph Schwantner [pupils]
- Marilyn Shrude
- Justinian Tamusuza
- Augusta Read Thomas
- Michael Twomey

=== Veselin Stoyanov ===
- Dora Draganova

=== Riccardo Stracciari ===
- Boris Christoff

=== Robert Strassburg ===
this teacher's teachers
Strassburg (1915–2003) studied with teachers including Paul Hindemith, Walter Piston, and Igor Stravinsky.
- John Serry Sr. [pupils]
- Diane Thome [pupils]
- Yehudi Wyner [pupils]

=== Richard Strauss ===
this teacher's teachers
Strauss (1864–1949) studied with teachers including August Tombo, Benno Walter, and Friedrich Wilhelm Meyer.
- Arnold Franchetti [pupils]
- Rudolf Schwarz [pupils]
- Hans Swarowsky [pupils]
- Felix Wolfes [pupils]
- Pauline de Ahna

=== Igor Stravinsky ===
this teacher's teachers
Stravinsky studied with teachers including Nikolai Rimsky-Korsakov.
- Mordecai Seter [pupils]
- Robert Strassburg [pupils]
- Achim Stoia

=== Edwin Stringham ===
- Burrill Phillips [pupils]

=== Marco Stroppa ===
- Tomi Räisänen

=== Gustav Strube ===
- Colin McPhee [pupils]

=== Steven Stucky ===
this teacher's teachers
Stucky studied with teachers including Robert Moffat Palmer.
- Larry Bitensky
- David Conte
- Thomas C. Duffy
- Fang Man
- Chris Gendall
- Yotam Haber
- Jesse Jones
- Hannah Lash
- James Matheson
- Marc Mellits
- Robert Paterson

=== Made Subandi ===
- Richard Marriott

=== Morton Subotnick ===
this teacher's teachers
Subotnick studied with teachers including Robert Erickson, Leon Kirchner, and Darius Milhaud.
- Rhys Chatham
- Brian Evans
- David Lang
- Anna Rubin

=== Leopold Suchsland ===
this teacher's teachers
Suchsland (1871-1943) studied with teachers including Erich Wolf Degner, Eduard Götze, Friedrich Grützmacher, Julius Klengel, and Karl Müller-Hartung.
- Hermann Grabner [pupils]

=== Otmar Suitner ===
this teacher's teachers
Suitner (1922-2010) studied with teachers including Clemens Krauss, Franz Ledwinka, and Fritz Weidlich.
- Beat Furrer [pupils]

=== Josef Suk ===
- Pavel Bořkovec [pupils]
- Jaroslav Ježek [pupils]
- Bohuslav Martinů [pupils]
- Klement Slavický [pupils]

=== Stjepan Šulek ===
- Dubravko Detoni [pupils]
- Stanko Horvat [pupils]
- Milko Kelemen [pupils]
- Davorin Kempf [pupils]
- Igor Kuljerić [pupils]

=== Arthur Sullivan ===
this teacher's teachers
Sullivan studied with teachers including William Bayley, George Cooper, John Goss, Arthur O'Leary, Moritz Hauptmann, Louis Plaidy, Julius Rietz, and William Sterndale Bennett.
- Walter Galpin Alcock [pupils]
- Tobias Matthay [pupils]
- Emma Mundella
- Herbert Sharpe [pupils]
- Mary Wurm

=== Herbert Sumsion ===
this teacher's teachers
Sumsion (1899-1995) studied with teachers including Herbert Brewer.
- Tony Hewitt-Jones
- Donald Hunt
- Ian Kellam [pupils]
- John Sanders

=== Kenneth Sutherland ===
- Joseph Macdonald

=== I Wayan Suweca ===
- Rachel Ann Cooper
- David Harnish
- André Éric Létourneau
- Michael Tenzer [pupils]
- William Winant
- Sandra Wong

=== Alexander Sverjensky ===
this teacher's teachers
Sverjensky studied with teachers including Alexander Glazunov.
- Alison Bauld
- Suzanne Cooper
- Romola Costantino
- Richard Farrell
- Grant Foster
- Rhondda Gillespie
- Neta Maughan
- Stephanie McCallum
- Helen Quach
- Nancy Salas
- Larry Sitsky
- David Tunley
- Malcolm Williamson
- Roger Woodward

=== Hans Swarowsky ===
this teacher's teachers
Swarowsky (1899-1975) studied with teachers including Felix Weingartner, Richard Strauss, Arnold Schoenberg, and Anton Webern.
- Gustav Meier [pupils]

Giuseppe Sinopoli

=== Jan Pieterszoon Sweelinck ===
- Andreas Düben
- Peter Hasse
- Lucas van Lennick [pupils] (fl. 1640s–1650s)
- Jacob Praetorius [pupils]
- Heinrich Scheidemann [pupils]
- Gottfried Scheidt
- Samuel Scheidt
- Melchior Schildt
- Paul Siefert

=== Richard Swift ===
this teacher's teachers
Swift studied with teachers including Leonard B. Meyer.
- Beth Anderson

=== Bolesław Szabelski ===
this teacher's teachers
Szabelski studied with teachers including Roman Statkowski and Karol Szymanowski.
- Henryk Górecki [pupils]

=== Ferenc Szabó ===
- István Láng

=== Tadeusz Szeligowski ===
this teacher's teachers
Szeligowski (1896–1963) studied with teachers including Nadia Boulanger and Paul Dukas.
- Zbigniew Bargielski
- Augustyn Bloch
- Joanna Bruzdowicz
- Wojciech Lukaszewski
- Tadeusz Wojciech Maklakiewicz
- Boleslaw Ocias
- Witold Rudzinski
- Marek Sart
- Aleksander Szeligowski
- Antoni Szuniewicz

=== George Szell ===
this teacher's teachers
Szell studied with teachers including Max Reger and Richard Robert.
- George Rochberg [pupils]

=== Karol Szymanowski ===
this teacher's teachers
Szymanowski studied with teachers including Zygmunt Noskowski.
- Bolesław Szabelski [pupils]
