= Zbigniew Bargielski =

Polish composer and teacher (born 1937)

Zbigniew Bargielski (born 21 January 1937) is a Polish composer and teacher. His works have been performed in many European countries, the United States, Australia and South America. On 24 February 2011 he was awarded by the Minister of Culture and National Heritage Bogdan Zdrojewski with the Medal for Merit to Culture.

== Life and career ==
Zbigniew Bargielski was born on 21 January 1937 in Łomża. He studied law at the Maria Curie-Sklodowska University in Lublin. In 1958 he began studying composition at the State Academy of Music in Warsaw under the guidance of eminent professor Tadeusz Szeligowski, and after his death, he continued with Boleslaw Szabelski in the State Music Academy in Katowice. In the years 1966-1967 he complemented his studies with Nadia Boulanger in Paris, and in 1972 at the Hochschule für Musik in Graz. In 1976 he moved to Austria where he studied at music school in Bruck an der Mur. Since 2002 he teaches composition at the Music Academy in Bydgoszcz, and since 2003 also in Kraków.
