= Albert Fuchs =

Swiss German musician

Albert Fuchs (born 6 August 1858 in Basel; died 15 February 1910 in Dresden; full name: Leonhard Johann Heinrich Albert Fuchs) was a Swiss-German composer, conductor, music educator, and music critic, as well as a collector of historical musical instruments.

== Life and work ==
Fuchs was the son of a master bookbinder born in 1806, working in Basel, whose father came from Mannheim, where he was a tobacco manufacturer. Fuchs' mother was born in 1834. Albert Fuchs attended gymnasium in Basel. Even at this time, he received musical training, which he deepened from 1876 to 1879 in Leipzig at the Conservatorium of Music. His final polish was given by the music theorist Salomon Jadassohn and the composer and pianist Carl Reinecke, completing their training with distinction. Reinecke was at that time the director of the Leipzig Gewandhaus Orchestra.

Just three years later, he retired to Saxony. In Oberlößnitz outside the gates of the residence city Dresden, he acquired a vineyard for a few years (today known as Haus Steinbach), on which he "realized his compositional plans".

At the end of the 1880s, Fuchs acquired the Conservatory originally founded by Wilhelm Freudenberg and bankrupt under Otto Taubmann in Wiesbaden and moved from the Saxon Nice on the Elbe to the Nice of the North on the Main. Wiesbaden, soon called the Imperial City, developed at that time following the imperial spa visits into the city with the most millionaire families in Germany. There, he led his own conservatory between 1889 and 1898, "whose reputation he reaffirmed as a universal music educator together with H. Riemann." Riemann joined him in 1890 from the princely conservatory in Sondershausen for the next five years, bringing his student Max Reger with him. With Reger at the harpsichord, Fuchs regularly gave house concerts, in which he tested specimens of his historical instruments, which found their way into his Collection of Historical Instruments.

With the call to the Royal Conservatory in Dresden in 1898, Fuchs returned to the Elbe. He was appointed there as a teacher for theory and singing and was honored with the title of Royal Professor in 1908. During this Dresden period, Fuchs composed his main works, his oratorios, which he premiered as conductor of the Robert Schumann Singakademie. Furthermore, Fuchs acted as a music critic, writing "highly regarded" reviews for the Dresdener Zeitung.

== Legacy ==
Fuchs's compositional work, including sacred and secular choral works as well as songs and oratorios, has fallen into oblivion today. However, his achievements in the research of historical musical instruments remain. Through the use of specimens acquired for his collection in concerts, he significantly promoted the revival of so-called Early Music from the periods before about 1750.

== Honors ==
Fuchs was awarded the title "Professor" in 1908. In Dresden, Fuchsstraße is named after him.

== Works ==
=== Compositions ===
- Blessed are those who die in the Lord. 1906.
- The Millennial Kingdom. 1908.
- Nirvana. (in the estate).

=== Editorship ===
- Several Italian vocal compositions

=== Writings ===
- On the History of Opera: a memorial sheet to Peri’s and Caccani’s operas published in 1600 (= Report of the Conservatorium for Music and Theater in Dresden; 44). Warnatz & Lehmann, Dresden 1900.
- Valuation of String Instruments. 1907 (reissued multiple times, currently: 17th edition 2017, ISBN 978-3-87350-043-3).

== Literature ==
- Stanley Sadie: The new Grove dictionary of music and musicians. Macmillan, London 1980.
- Alfons Ott (1961). "Fuchs, Leonhard Johann Heinrich Albert". Neue Deutsche Biographie (in German). Vol. 5. Berlin: Duncker & Humblot. pp. 676–676. (full text online).
- Theodore Baker: A Biographical Dictionary of Musicians. 3rd ed., 1919.
- Monographs of Modern Musicians. Vol. III: 15 Biographies of Contemporary Composers with Portraits. C. F. Kahnt Successor, Leipzig 1909.
- Alfred Berner, SL: Fuchs, Albert. In: Ludwig Finscher (Hrsg.): Die Musik in Geschichte und Gegenwart. Zweite Ausgabe, Personenteil, Band 7 (Franco – Gretry). Bärenreiter/Metzler, Kassel u. a. 2002, ISBN 3-7618-1117-9, Sp. 226 (Online-Ausgabe, für Vollzugriff Abonnement erforderlich)
