= August Kohn =

German violinist and composer

August Kohn (1732 – c. 1801/1802) was a German violinist and composer of the late Baroque to Classical transition era.

== Life ==
Kohn (also Kohne; Cohne; Coun; Coni) was born in Königsberg (now Kaliningrad) and received his first musical instruction on the violin with his father and then later with a violinist called Zachow.

In 1750, Kohn moved to Berlin where he was employed as a violinist in the Hofkapelle of Karl Friedrich, Margrave of Brandenburg-Schwedt. During this time, he studied composition with Christoph Schaffrath, harpsichordist and chamber musician of Princess Anna Amalia of Prussia.

In 1760, he joined the royal Hofkapelle in Berlin where he remained until his retirement in 1798. He died a few years later in 1801 or 1802.

Kohn's surviving works, most featuring violin, demonstrate his considerable skill on that instrument. His compositional style is highly representative of that which prevailed in Berlin during the second half of the 18th century featuring elements of the Empfindsamer Stil and the galante style. In his Sonatas for violin, Kohn makes use of a surprising range of expressive techniques including the use of a mute, pizzicato, detailed dynamic and articulation marks, and very specific tempo indications.

It also seems that Kohn was employed in Berlin as a music copyist. His handwriting can be seen in a number of manuscripts of works by Johann Gottlieb Janitsch, Johann Gottlieb Graun, Francesco Geminiani, Jiří Antonín Benda and Carl Philipp Emanuel Bach held in the archive of the Sing-Akademie zu Berlin. Remarkably, his manuscripts of works by Jean-Marie Leclair, C.P.E. Bach and Graun have also been found in the Library of Congress in Washington, D.C. Thus, he was responsible for the preservation of a large amount of music which would not have otherwise survived.

== Works ==
- Concerto in D minor for violin, strings and continuo
- Concerto in G major for violin, strings and continuo
- Concerto in C major for harpischord, strings and continuo
- Sonata in G major for violin and continuo
- Sonata in E-flat major for violin and continuo
- Sonata in E-flat major for violin and continuo
- Sonata in A minor for violin and continuo
- Sonata in G major for violin and obligato harpsichord
- Sonata in A major for 2 violins
- 6 Sonatas for 2 violins and continuo, Op.1 (only violin 1 part surviving)

The Ringmacher Catalogue of 1773 also lists a number of Kohn's works which are missing, including 2 string quartets, 2 sets of 3 trio sonatas for flute, violin and continuo, and a concerto for flute, strings and continuo.
