= Anna Rubin =

American composer (born 1946)

Anna Rubin (born 1946) is an American composer of electroacoustic and instrumental music.

== Biography ==
Anna Rubin studied with composers Mel Powell, Earle Brown, and Pauline Oliveros while completing her MFA at California Institute of the Arts. She also holds a doctorate in composition from Princeton University where she studied with Paul Lansky. After completing her studies, she taught composition at the Oberlin Conservatory of Music and Lafayette College. From 2002 to 2018, she taught at the University of Maryland, Baltimore County.

Rubin is a member of the American Music Center, is a co-founder of the Independent Composers Association of LA, serves on the editorial board of Perspectives of New Music, and has served as president of the International Alliance for Women in Music.

Rubin is the author of professional articles on the work of composer Francis Dhomont.

== Honors and awards ==
- Two awards, Maryland State Arts Council
- Fellow, National Orchestral Association
- Delta Ensemble Gaudeamus Prize for De Nacht: Lament for Malcolm X, 1984
- Jury prize, Aether Festival #1 - International Radio Art/Radio Station KUNM, Albuquerque, NM, for Family Stories: Sophie, Sally, with Laurie Hollander

== Selected works ==
Rubin composes for chamber ensembles, orchestra, chorus, digital audio and live electronics. Selected works include:

- Crying the Laughing and Golden for tape (1982–1983)
- De Nacht: Lament for Malcolm X (1984)
- Hiding Faces, Open Faces for viola, electronic soundtrack and video (1988)
- Viola a Tre for 3 violas (1988)
- Remembering for mezzo-soprano, piano and tape (1989)
- Seachanges for viola da gamba and tape (1996)
- Family Stories: Sophie, Sally (1998)
