= Wilhelm Rauch =

Austrian piano pedagogue and music editor

- Born: Austria
- Died: Vienna, Austria
- Genres: Classical music
- Occupations: Pianist, music editor, piano pedagogue
- Instrument: Piano
- Years active: c. 1884–1924

Wilhelm Rauch (fl. 1884 – 1924) was an Austrian pianist, music teacher, and editor, primarily known for his pedagogical work with Universal Edition where he is identified as one of their primary editors for instructional piano music.

He was professor of piano at the Gesellschaft der Musikfreunde, the organisation who later established the Conservatorium Wien (Vienna Conservatory). More specifically, Rauch was the professor of the preparatory piano course (Vorbildungsschule Klavier), which the young Austrian composer, Alexander von Zemlinsky, joined as a student from 1884. As a teacher, he is known to have taught at least five notable students, Theodor Fuchs, Richard Stöhr, Manolis Kalomiris, Camilla Frydan and Alexander von Zemlinsky.

As an editor, he produced a number of instructive works for piano, including sonatinas by Mozart, and Beethoven, études and editions of piano sonatas by Haydn.

Rauch was a respected figure among his colleagues. Notably, the composer Franz Schreker dedicated his Suite nach Oskar Wildes Novelle "Der Geburtstag der Infantin" (Piano reduction, 1924) to him with the inscription: "Herrn Wilhelm Rauch Professor am Wiener Conservatorium gewidmet" (Dedicated to Mr. Wilhelm Rauch, Professor at the Vienna Conservatory).

== Works ==
Rauch was a prolific editor and compiler of pedagogical piano literature, particularly for Universal Edition (Vienna). His revisions of standard 19th-century technical studies and curated collections of student repertoire became foundational texts in the Viennese piano teaching tradition.

The following are some of the published works:

- Sonatinen-Album, Vol. I (UE 335) : subtitled Eine Sammlung 21 wertvoller und beliebter Sonatinen; a collection of pieces by composers such as Clementi and Kuhlau, edited by Rauch.
- Sonatinen-Album, Vol. II (UE 336) – edited by Rauch.
- Czerny: 100 Recreations (UE 304) – revised and edited by Rauch.
- Czerny: Schule der Geläufigkeit [School of Velocity]; Op. 299. (Mainz, Schott) – edited by Rauch.
- Czerny: Schule des Virtuosen für Clavier [School of the Virtuoso for Piano]; Op.365. (Cranz Edition 77) – edited by Rauch.
- Czerny: Vierzig tägl Studien für Clavier [Forty Daily Studies for Piano]; Op. 337. (Cranz Edition 76) – edited by Rauch.
- Czerny: Ausgewählte Etüden für Pianoforte [Selected Études for Pianoforte]; Op. 261 & Op. 821. (Cranz, Leipzig) – Revised and edited by L. Landskron and W. Rauch.
- Czerny: Die Kunst der Fingerfertigkeit [The Art of Finger Dexterity]; Op. 740 – edited by Rauch.
- Diabelli: 2 Sonatinas for Piano 4-hands Op.24; (Universal Edition, 1901) – edited by Rauch.
- Diabelli: 3 Sonatinas for Piano 4-hands Op.152; (Universal Edition, 1901) – edited by Rauch.
- Diabelli: 7 Sonatinen für Piano Solo Op.168; Vienna: (Universal Edition, 1901) – edited by Rauch.
- Dussek: Piano Sonata No.15, Op.39 No.2; (Leipzig: August Cranz) – edited by Rauch.
- Dussek: Piano Sonata No.16, Op.39 No.3; (Leipzig: August Cranz) – edited by Rauch.
- Haydn: Sonata No. 31 Vol. IV (Universal Edition, 1901) – edited by Rauch.
- Haydn: Complete Haydn Piano Sonatas Vol. I-IV (Universal Edition, 1901) – edited by Rauch.
- Herz: Scales and Exercises (UE 316) – revised and edited by Rauch.
- Kessler: 20 ausgew. Etuden zur Vollendung bereits gebildeter Clavier-spieler [20 Selected Études for the Refinement of Advanced Pianists]; Op. 100 – revised by Prof. Wilhelm Rauch.
- Mozart: Fantasia e Fuga, KV 394, No. III in C major. (Leipzig: August Cranz) – revised and fingered by Rauch.
- Hans Schmitt (1835–1907): Lehrplan für die ersten Jahre des Clavierunterrichtes [Curriculum for the first years of piano instruction] – revised by Prof. Wilhelm Rauch.
