= Joseph Pehrson =

American classical composer

Joseph Pehrson (August 14, 1950 – April 4, 2020) was an American composer and pianist.

== Life ==
Pehrson comes from Detroit, Michigan. He studied at the University of Michigan and Eastman School of Music. (D.M.A. 1981). His teachers include Leslie Bassett, Joseph Schwantner, Otto Luening and Elie Siegmeister. From 1992 to 1993 he was composer-in-residence at the University of Akron. Since 1983 he served as co-director of the Composers Concordance in New York City. He mostly wrote pieces for orchestral and chamber music. His compositions have been performed at Merkin Concert Hall, Carnegie Hall and Symphony Space. Concerts were held in Eastern Europe and Russia. Recently, he was working with the German Ensemble Sortisatio.
