= Gabriel Möhlich =

German Baroque composer and dancing master (c.1590 - c.1640)

Gabriel Möhlich also Mölich (c. 1590 – 1640s) was a German Baroque composer and dancing master. He graduated from his studies with Heinrich Schütz in 1619 with the publication of his Geistliche Madrigale for 4 and 5 voices, Leipzig. From 1620 he studied ballet in Paris and in 1638 choreographed Schütz's opera-ballet Orpheus und Euridice and ten more Italian ballette.
