= Nicolas Roze =

French composer

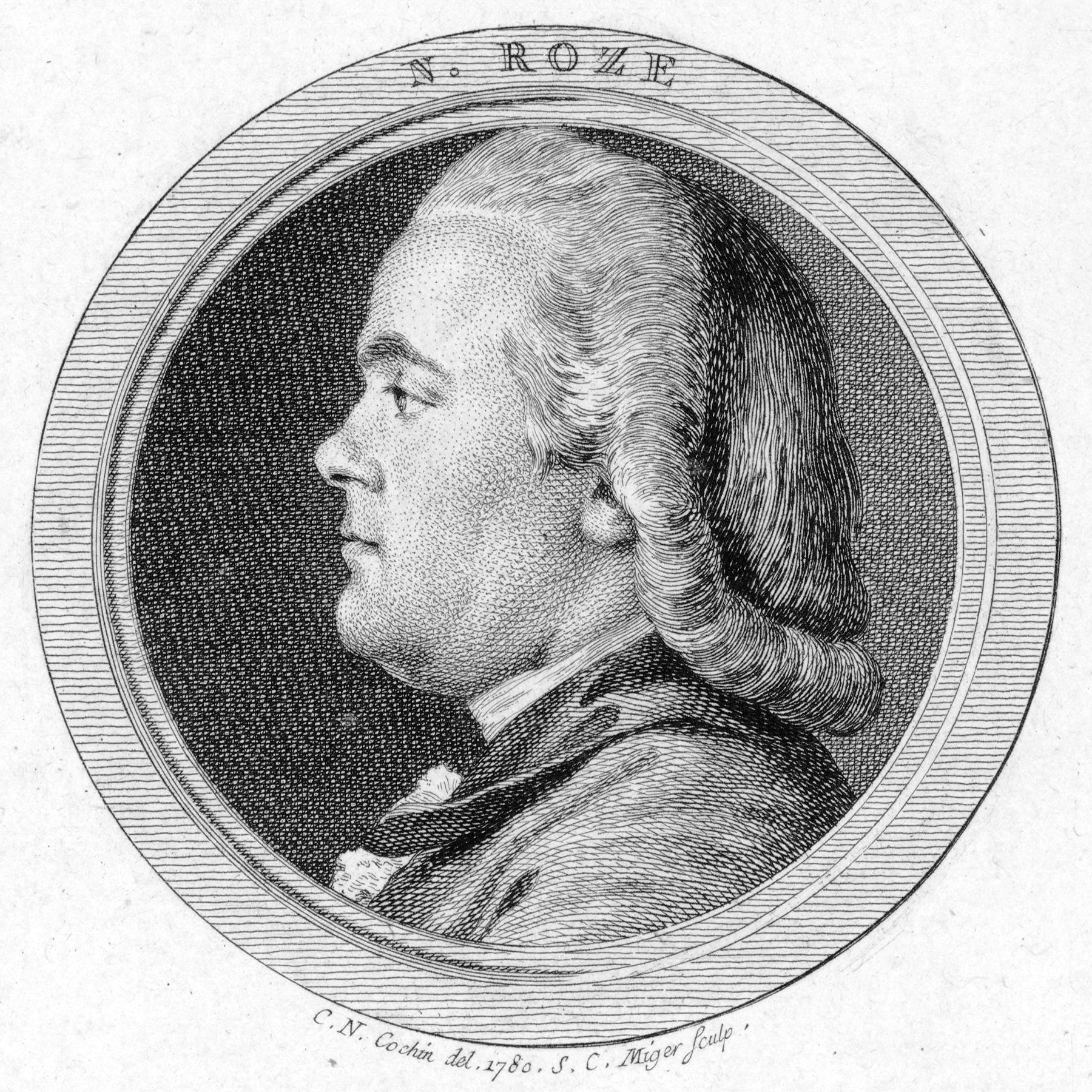
A 1780 portrait of Nicolas Roze by Simon Charles Miger.

Nicolas Roze (17 January 1745 – 30 September 1819) was a French composer and music theorist.

== Biography ==
Born in Mercurey, Roze was a choirboy at the Basilique Notre-Dame de Beaune, Nicolas Roze was noted for his beautiful voice and received a good musical training. He was not twelve years old when he composed a motet with orchestra. He was invited to enter the King's music as a page, but his parents preferred to have him finish his studies at the Beaune college and then at the Autun seminary.

A master of music in Beaune from 1767 to 1769, he had a mass of his composition performed there, and went to Paris to present it to Antoine Dauvergne, superintendent of the music of the king. In 1769, the latter commissioned him the motet Dixit insipiens, given to the Concert Spirituel. His first published work was a Quartet for flute and strings in C minor (1769).

After spending a few years at the Cathédrale Saint-Maurice d'Angers, he settled in Paris, where in 1775 he became a chapel master in the Église des Saints-Innocents. In 1779, after a dispute with the ecclesiastical authorities, he devoted himself to the teaching of music and wrote his system of harmony, which was published by Jean-Benjamin de La Borde.

His motet Vivat in æternum was performed during the coronation of Napoleon (2 December 1804) under the direction of his former student Jean-François Lesueur. From 1807 to his death he was a librarian at the Conservatoire de Paris.

Along François-Joseph Gossec and Étienne Ozi, abbott Roze was the author of the first published method of serpent (1814). This instrument, which had been in use for about two centuries, was soon to begin to decline. But one reason for this was that his use in military music had grown strongly during the Revolution and the Empire, and whose teaching at that time was often diffused by private teachers for lack of schools.

A freemason, he was reported as a member of the lodges Les Cœurs Simples de l'Étoile Polaire (1778–1779), Saint Jean d'Écosse du Contrat social (1783) and L'Olympique de la Parfaite Estime (1786), then Les Neuf Sœurs (1806).

He died in Saint-Mandé aged 74.

== Bibliography ==
- Sylvie Jeannerot, L'Abbé Nicolas Roze (1745-1819), maître de chapelle et bibliothècaire, thesis, Université Strasbourg 2, 1998
- François-Joseph Fétis, Biographie universelle des musiciens et bibliographie générale de la musique, volume 7, Paris, Firmin-Didot, 1867, p. 502.
