= Johann Theodor Roemhildt =

Johann Theodor Roemhildt (3 October 1684 – 26 October 1756) was a German Baroque composer born in Salzungen. As a child, he studied in Ruhla with Johann Jacob Bach; and from age thirteen on at St. Thomas' School, Leipzig under Johann Schelle and Johann Kuhnau. His fellow students included Christoph Graupner, Johann Friedrich Fasch and Johann David Heinichen.

Roemhildt was court kapellmeister to Heinrich Duke of Saxony (1661–1738) at Merseburg, where he later died.

== Works, editions and recordings ==
236 of Roemhildt's cantatas survive, 50 of which are solo cantatas, along with a St. Matthew Passion.

- Cantatas Es geht kein andrer Weg zum Himmel and Meine Sonne stehet stille Klaus Mertens, Accademia Daniel, cond. Shalev Ad-El, 2007.
- Cantatas Kommt, Ihr Herzen, kommt ihr Lippen and Nun danket alle Gott, in "Christmas Cantatas of 18th Century Danzig": Goldberg Baroque Ensemble, cond. Andrzej Mikolaj Szadejko; Kantaty Bozonarodzeniowe; Sarton Records, Warsaw, 2010
