= Gordon Saunders =

English composer and music pedagogue

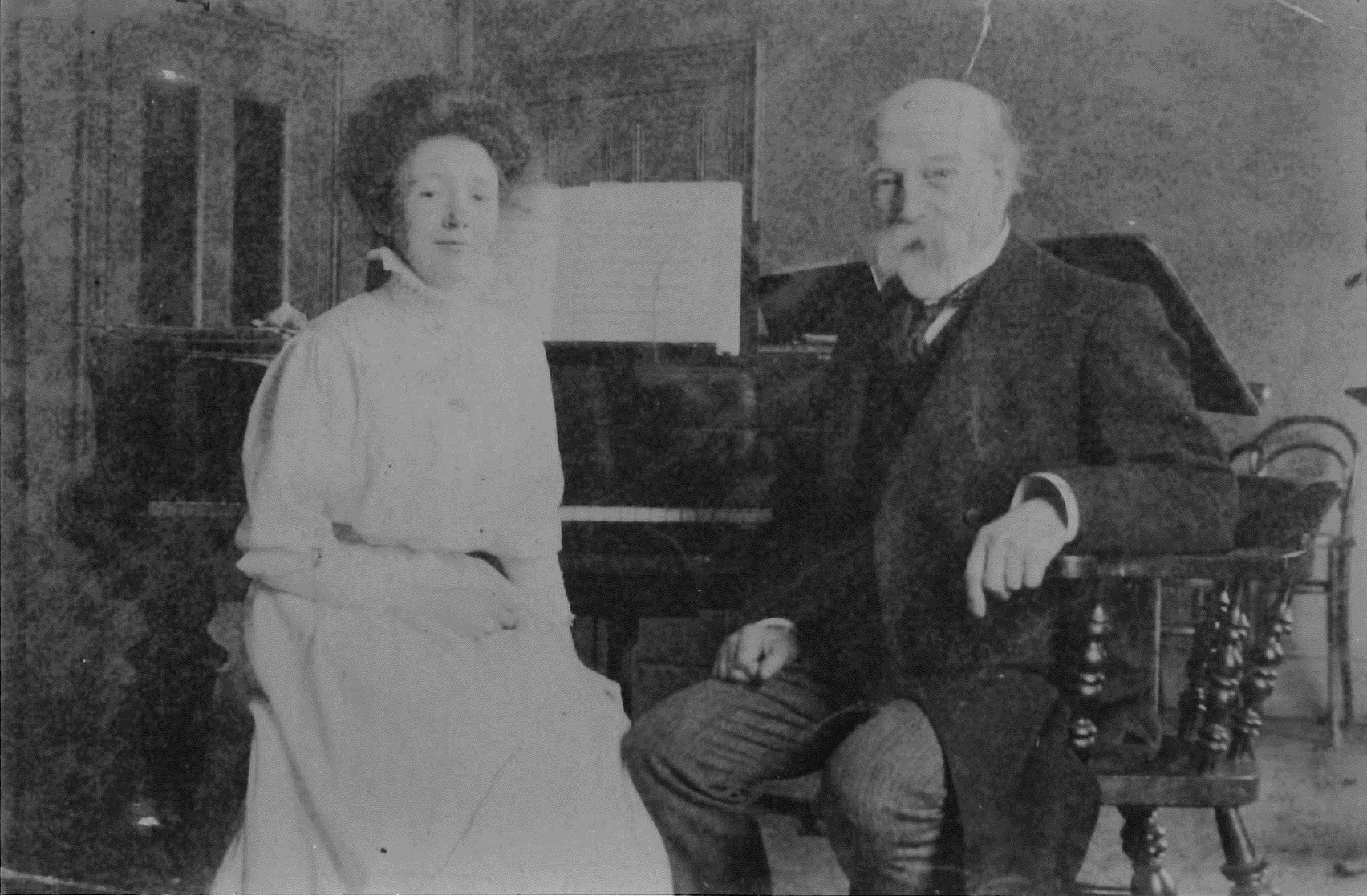
Saunders with student Edith K. Comley (nee Bird), ca.1907–1912 at Trinity College of Music, London.

Joseph Gordon Saunders (1837 – 17 January 1912) was an English composer of songs, church music and organ music. He was also a teacher of composition, piano, harmony and counterpoint at the Trinity College of Music. He was known to have conducted ensemble classes.

Saunders studied with the organist and composer Edward John Hopkins and also with organist and composer Elizabeth Stirling and virtuoso pianist and composer Henry Litolff. He studied at the University of Oxford where he gained a Doctor of Music. Whilst at Oxford, he wrote a textbook on counterpoint, Examples in strict counterpoint (old and new), which was endorsed by the university.

Saunders was the first teacher of British composer Granville Bantock at the Trinity College of Music, London, where he was one of the seven founding members of the college. In 1884, he became conductor of the Clapton Philharmonic Society.

As part of his role at the Trinity College of Music, Saunders was an examiner and in 1896 he travelled to Australia and New Zealand to conduct numerous graded music examinations in multiple cities, Adelaide, Melbourne, Ballarat, Tasmania, and Brisbane.

He was an associate to the Philharmonic Society.

== Works ==
- Eight Traditional Japanese Pieces – for solo tenor recorder, descant recorder or flute (published 1979)
- Memories (1868) – song. Verse by J. C. Harman, Esq. (Ashdown and Parry, London)
- I will give thanks. Thanksgiving anthem (1868)
- Festal March (1877)
- Mazurka for the pianoforte (1880)
- The Lord Is in His Holy Temple – Anthem (printed 1881)
- Polish Dance for pianoforte (1892)
- Fugue in D-Minor (1897)
- Magnificat and Nunc Dimittis in F (1897)
- Prelude and Fugue (1897)
- Marche de Chiesa (1897)
- Postlude in G (1897)
- Ave Maria (1897)
- Vivat Rex-Variations and Fugue on the National Anthem (1903)

== Bibliography ==
- Saunders, Gordon (1897) A practical treatise on the art of phrasing (in three parts), A Hammond & Co
- Saunders, Gordon (1899) Examples in strict counterpoint (old and new), Ewer Novello
- Saunders, Gordon (1901) Examples in Strict Counterpoint: Part II
- Saunders, Gordon (1912) Examples in Strict Counterpoint: Part II Ewer Novello
