= Victor Schiøler =

Danish classical pianist (1899 – 1967)

Victor Schiøler was a Danish classical pianist (7 April 1899 – 17 February 1967).

== Biography ==
Victor Schiøler was born, and died, in Copenhagen. He studied with his mother, then with Ignaz Friedman and Artur Schnabel. He made his debut on 23 January 1914 in Copenhagen and from 1919 toured Europe. He made his first American tour after the war in 1948-49. He was also active as a conductor in Denmark. He recorded for Danacord and RCA Victor.
