= Derek Keller =

American classical composer

Derek Lawrence Keller (born 1971) is an American composer, guitarist, vocalist, and teacher. Keller previously served as a visiting assistant professor of music composition at Oberlin Conservatory of Music, and he currently curates the music series for St. Paul's Episcopal Church, focusing on highlighting original avant-garde and improvisational music. He also works as an adjunct professor at William Jessup University.

Keller earned a B.Mus. in music composition and guitar as well as an M.M. in music composition at the University of Georgia. He holds a Ph.D. in music composition from University of California at San Diego, where he studied under the direction of Pulitzer Prize-winning composer Roger Reynolds. He has also studied composition with Anthony Davis, Chaya Czernowin, Rand Steiger, George Crumb, Jean-Luc Hervé, Brian Ferneyhough, David Lang, and Charles Wuorinen.

Keller has received many commissions, including from John Zorn, RedFishBlueFish, Groundworks Dance Theater, Cappella Gloriana, Athens Master Chorale, Truman State University, and MACRO Analysis Creative Research Organization.

Keller was born in Philadelphia. He has lived in St. Louis, Atlanta, and La Jolla. He currently resides in Sacramento, California.

== Discography ==
Impositions and Consequences (2007). Tzadik 8032. Featuring original works for chamber orchestra, voice, solo electric guitar, and percussion quartet performed by the world-renowned RedFishBlueFish.

Remedy (2006), Morris Palter. Centaur CRC 2742. Featuring works by Derek Keller, Attitudes...Assumptions Shattered; Karlheinz Stockhausen, Matthew Burtner, James Dillon, Thomas DeLio, David Lang, and Jean-Charles François.

Colin McAllister and Derek Keller: Solos and Duos for Guitar (2004). Old King Cole OKCD2006. Featuring works by Steve Reich, Franco Donotoni, Tristan Murail, Chris Mercer, Derek Keller, and Helmut Lachenmann.

Channel Crossings (2002), Cappella Gloriana. Old King Cole OKCD005. Choral music.

== Compositions ==
Fear Ego Love (2003–2004) for amplified mixed quartet, rock band and chamber choir.
Attitudes…Self-reflection (Spring 2003) for electric guitar and interactive computer accompaniment.
Eruptive Plains (1999) for winds, percussion and piano.
Triaxis (1998) for violin, b-flat clarinet doubling bass clarinet, and guitar.
Holtranix II: an interactive improvisation for solo MIDI controller and computer (1997).
Holtranix I: an improvisation for soloist and computer (1996–1997).
Three Pieces for Piano (1996).
Character Piece (1996) for brass quintet.
Night of Hell: a mini musical drama for computer sound and baritone/tenor voice (1995–96).
Sonus in Contiuum: Breach, Core, Edge (1994) for electric, percussion, and soprano saxophone.
Four Pieces (1994) for cello and piano.
Psyche (1993) for flute, clarinet, oboe, amplified guitar, violin, cello, and soprano.
