= Bolesław Szabelski =

Polish composer (1896–1979)

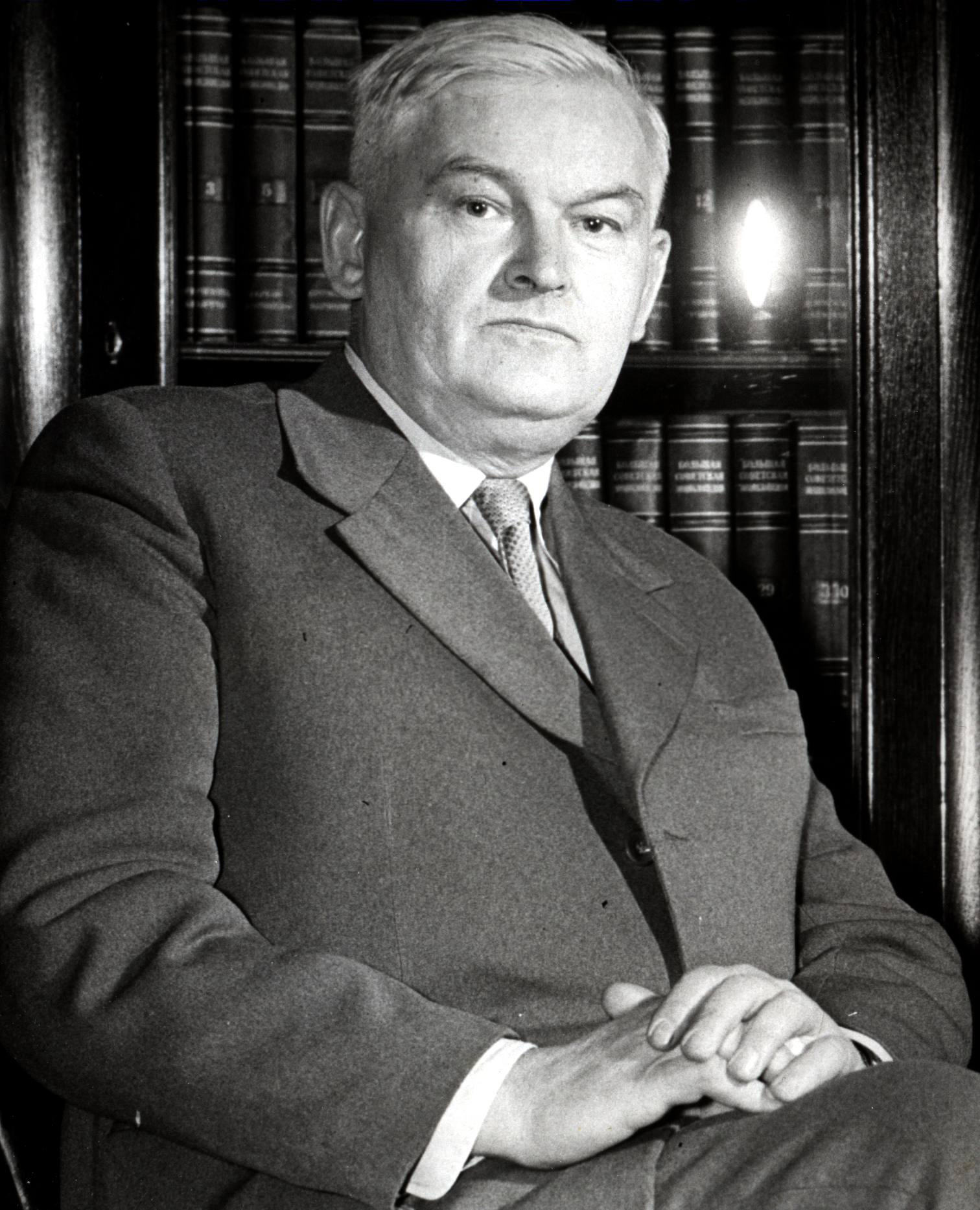
Bolesław Szabelski

Bolesław Szabelski (3 December 1896 in Radoryż – 27 August 1979 in Katowice) was a Polish composer of modern classical music. While his style shifted and varied over the course of his life, he is best known for his atonal work composed during the 1950s and 1960s.

Szabelski studied at the Polish Musical Society School with Łysakowski in 1915. He attended the Warsaw Conservatory under Karol Szymanowski. Between 1929 and 1939, he taught organ and composition at the Conservatoire of Katowice.

Szabelski began working in the neoclassical and romanticism modes typical of the early 20th century. He adopted the serialist technique in the 1950s and was one of a number of Polish New Wave composers to embrace atonality. His early work had been characterised by monumental forms and fanfare motifs and Szabelski adapted to the new aesthetic while retaining his old signatures. As a result, he developed a style described as "strikingly innovative".

He composed five symphonies (1926, 1934, 1951, 1956 and 1968), as well as concertos, chamber and choral works. Szabelski was highly influential on the "New Polish School" composers of the early 1950s and had a formative influence on his student Henryk Mikołaj Górecki.

== Works ==
Selected works
Year of completion	Composition	Instrumentation
1926	Symphony I	Orchestra
1934	Symphony II	Orchestra
1938	Toccata	Orchestra
1946	Sinfonietta	Orchestra, Percussion
1951	Symphony III	Orchestra
1956	Symphony IV	Orchestra
1962	Aforyzmy "9"	Nine instruments
1964	Koncert	Orchestra
1968	Symphony V	Choir, organ, and Orchestra
1976	Mikołaj Kopernik	Solo Soprano, Choir, and Orchestra
1976	Kantata Reduta	Choir and Orchestra

== Honours and awards ==
- 1959 - Commander's Cross of the Order of Polonia Restituta
- 1961, 1967 - Award of the Association of Polish Composers
- 1972 - 1000 Anniversary Medal of the Polish State
- 1976 - Commander's Cross with Star of the Order of Polonia Restituta
- Order of the Banner of Work Class I

and many state awards and prizes

== Sources ==
- Rappoport-Gelfand, Lidia. Musical life in Poland: the postwar years, 1945-1977. &B Arts International, 1991. ISBN 2-88124-319-3
