= Concert Artists Guild =

American musical institution

The Concert Artists Guild is an American musical institution, based in New York City and established in 1951. It is dedicated to discovering and nurturing musical talent, and helping musicians start careers. It provides scholarships and grants, and also runs the CAG Records label.

According to organizer Richard Weinert, "We begin with 350 musicians of any type or sort—vocalists, duos, instrumentalists, worldwide—whittle them down until 12 finalists remain, and from those, usually three or four are selected who have the combination of training, talent, and that extra pizzazz that is needed to have a successful concert career." The three or four winners are then managed for several years, mentoring them in becoming successful concert musicians.

Hedge fund manager and philanthropist Roy Niederhoffer has served as Chairman of the Concert Artists Guild.

== Winners ==
Winners of the Concert Artists Guild:

=== 1950s ===
1951

- Pasquale Verduce (Basso)
- Rosalie Adragna (Soprano)
- Richard Leshin (Violin)
- Frank Matori (Piano)
- Angela Pistelli (Piano)
- Sandra Propp (Piano)
- Yvette Rudin (Violin)
- Vincent Speranda (Piano)
- Barbara Berkman (Piano)
- Osias Wilensky (Piano)
- Elizabeth Devlin (Soprano)
- Laurence Watson (Baritone)
- Robin Allardice (Soprano)
- Ira Shur (Tenor)
- Helen Rice (Soprano)
- Samuel Sanders (Piano)
- Roger Kamien (Piano)
- Alan Grishman (Violin)
- Nathan Goldstein (Violin)
- Harriet Emerson (Violin)
- Kenneth Chertok (Baritone)
- Ruth Brall (Soprano)
- Anita Katchen (Piano)
- Sally Allen (Soprano)
- Thaddeus Brys (Cello)

1952

- Louis F. Simon (Violin)
- Militades Siadimas (Violin)
- Robert Natkoff (Violin)
- Dina Soresi (Soprano)
- Virginia-Gene Shankel (Piano)
- Helen Spina (Soprano)
- Leah Mellman (Piano)
- Shirley Bardin (Soprano)
- Joseph Plon (Piano)
- Harry Wimmer (Cello)
- Ara Charles Adrian (Soprano)
- Catalina Zandueta (Soprano)
- Mary-Louise Brown (Piano)
- Charlotte Bloecher (Soprano)
- Olanda Drewery (Soprano)
- Byron Goode (Flute)
- Eleanor Mandel (Piano)
- Esther Fernandez (Piano)
- Andrew Frierson (Baritone)
- Valerie Lamoree (Soprano)
- Gabriel Banat (Violin)
- Daniel Abrams (Piano)
- Allen Rogers (Piano)

1953

- Oliver Colbentson (Violin)
- David Wells (Cello)
- Beverly Somach (Violin)
- Dorothy Phillips (Violin)
- Stephen Manes (Piano)
- Ruth Lakeway (Soprano)
- Uzi Wiesel (Cello)
- Leonor Umstead (Piano)
- Muriel Kilby (Piano)
- William de Valentine (Basso)
- Paul Gurevich (Violin)
- Barbara Allen (Soprano)
- Arabella Hong (Soprano)
- Robert Hearn (Baritone)
- Ellen Alexander (Mezzo-soprano)
- Stanley Babin (Piano)
- Allen Brown (Piano)
- Christina C. Cardillo (Soprano)
- Norma Ferris (Violin)
- Leyna Gabriele (Soprano)

1954

- Bernard Kreger (Piano)
- Thomas Stewart (Bass-baritone)
- Sosio Manzo (Tenor)
- Martin Canin (Piano)
- Bruce Stegg (Piano)
- Mara Shorr (Soprano)
- Gertrude Prinzi (Soprano)
- Marvin Morgenstern (Violin)
- Sheila Minzer (Piano)
- Shirley Givens (Violin)
- Mitchell Andrews (Piano)
- Charles Dunn (Baritone)
- Eileen DiTullio (Soprano)
- Emilia Cundari (Soprano)
- Nancy Cirillo (Violin)
- Isidor Lateiner (Violin)
- Donald Betts (Piano)
- Evelyn Lear (Soprano)
- Martin Eshelman (Violin)
- Robert Menga (Violin)

1955

- Clifford Snyder (Baritone)
- William Metcalf (Baritone)
- Dorothy Happel (Violin)
- Betty Allen (Mezzo)
- Ramy Shevelov (Violin)
- Emilio Rosario (Piano)
- John Pidgeon (Piano)
- Donna Pegors (Soprano)
- Joan Moynagh (Soprano)
- Elaine Bonazzi (Mezzo)
- Lorraine Wollnik (Soprano)
- Ellen Pahl (Piano)
- Eugenia Hyman (Piano)
- Audrey Kooper (Piano)
- Ralph Feinstein (Violin)
- Sara Jane Fleming (Soprano)
- Erick Friedman (Violin)
- Zelda Gilgore (Piano)
- Andrew Heath (Piano)
- Alexander Horvath (Violin)
- Harry Wimmer (Cello)
- Frances Bartley (Soprano)

1956

- Madelyn Vose (Mezzo-Soprano)
- Nancy Hall (Mezzo-Soprano)
- Sophia Steffan (Mezzo-Soprano)
- Morey Ritt (Piano)
- Lynn Rasmussen (Soprano)
- Daniel Pollack (Piano)
- Denver Oldham (Piano)
- Martina Arroyo (Soprano)
- Hyman Bress (Violin)
- Ada Pinchuk (Piano)
- Manuel Maramba (Piano)
- Angelica Lozada (Soprano)
- Thomas Carey (Baritone)
- Charles Castleman (Violin)
- Mary Freeman (Violin)
- Deanne Garcy (Piano)
- Harold Jones (Flute)
- Margarita Zambrana (Soprano)

1957

- Mary Hensley (Mezzo-Soprano)
- Clifton Matthews (Piano)
- Sheila Henig (Piano)
- Grant Williams (Tenor)
- Jeanette Scovotti (Soprano)
- Charles Engel (Piano)
- Joseph Schwartz (Piano)
- Annina Celli (Mezzo-Soprano)
- Reri Grist (Soprano)
- Shirley Verrett (Soprano)
- Eva Marie Wolfe (Soprano)
- Richard Syracuse (Piano)
- Donn-Alexandre Feder (Piano)
- Olegna Fuschi (Piano)
- Tana Bawden (Piano)

1958

- Howard Lebow (Piano)
- Victoria Markowski (Piano)
- Hugh Matheny (Oboe)
- Raymond Michalski (Basso)
- Mayne Miller (Piano)
- Lois Carole Pachucki (Piano)
- Judith Basch (Violin)
- Frank Cedrone (Piano)
- Margaret Kalil (Soprano)
- Agustin Anievas (Piano)
- Joy Pottle (Piano)
- Judith Raskin (Soprano)
- Harold Johnson (Tenor)
- Ramon Gilbert (Baritone)
- Georgia Davis (Contralto)
- Herbert Chatzky (Piano)
- Howard Aibel (Piano)

1959

- Joan Wall (Mezzo-Soprano)
- Rita Schoen (Soprano)
- Andre De La Varre (Piano)
- Toby Saks (Cello)
- Beatrice Rippy (Soprano)
- Deborah Reeder (Cello)
- Helen Cox Raab (Contralto)
- Dan Marek (Tenor)
- Richard Kuelling (Basso)
- Doris Allen (Violin)
- Maris-Stella Bonnell (Piano)
- Jack Dane Litten (Tenor)
- Marilyn Anne Laughlin (Flute)
- Phyllis Frankel (Soprano)
- Alexander Fiorillo (Piano)
- Enid Dale (Piano)

=== 1960s ===
1960

- Ronald Rogers (Piano)
- Albertine Baumgartner (Piano)
- Naomi Weiss (Piano)
- Catherine Wallace (Soprano)
- Ilana Vered (Piano)
- George Shirley (Tenor)
- Michael Rogers (Piano)
- Laurel Miller (Mezzo)
- Charles Haupt (Violin)
- Joanne Cohen (Violin)
- Mark Chalat (Tenor)
- Arline Billings (Piano)
- Charles Wendt (Cello)
- Carol Wilder (Soprano)
- Patricia MacDonald (Soprano)

1961

- Marcia Heller (Piano)
- Miguel Pinto (Piano)
- Thomas Vasiloff (Baritone)
- Maria Luisa Lopez-Vito (Piano)
- David Rosenstein (Bass)
- Malka Silberberg (Mezzo)
- Gene Boucher (Baritone)
- Harriet Lawyer (Soprano)
- Vera Graf (Violin)
- Kenneth Goldsmith (Violin)
- Edgar Fischer (Cello)
- Jesse Levine (Viola)
- Alpha Brawner (Soprano)
- Rama Jucker (Cello)
- Edward Zolas (Piano)
- Jerome Rose (Piano)

1962

- Bonnie Bogle (Piano)
- Evangelin Marko (Cello)
- Wanda Maximilien (Piano)
- Donna Precht (Soprano)
- James Stafford (Piano)
- Donald Walker (Piano)
- Marie Traficante (Soprano)
- David Kaiserman (Piano)
- Madeline Stevenson (Soprano)
- Masako Fujii (Violin)
- Sanford Margolis (Piano)
- Alexandra Hunt (Soprano)
- Alan Finell (Piano)
- Marilyn Dubow (Violin)
- Daniel Domb (Cello)
- Isabel Berg (Piano)
- Ernest Chang (Piano)

1963

- Edward Aldwell (Piano)
- Jamesetta Holliman (Piano)
- Evelyn Watson (Soprano)
- William Steck (Violin)
- Neal O’Doan (Piano)
- Helen Merritt (Soprano)
- Jung-Ja Kim (Piano)
- David Yeomans (Piano)
- Leonidas Lipovetsky (Piano)
- Mary Beck (Soprano)
- Margaret Kalil (Soprano)
- Nina Kaleska (Soprano)
- Nan Gullo (Harp)
- Lee Dougherty (Soprano)
- Verica Fassel (Piano)
- Janet Goodman (Piano)
- Grace DiBattista (Soprano)
- Glenn Jacobson (Piano)

1964

- William Greene (Tenor)
- Jean Kraft (Mezzo-Soprano)
- Constance Douglass (Piano)
- Sheila Schonbrun (Soprano)
- Takako Nishizaki (Violin)
- Louis Nagel (Piano)
- Nancy Wyner (Mezzo-Soprano)
- Richard Syracuse (Piano)
- Winifred Dettore (Soprano)
- Findlay Cockrell (Piano)
- William Cheadle (Piano)
- Matitiahu Braun (Violin)
- Shirley Love (Mezzo-Soprano)
- Fernando Illanes (Tenor)
- Stephen Flamberg (Piano)

1965

- Phyllis Mailing (Mezzo-Soprano)
- Mertine Johns (Mezzo-Soprano)
- Karen Shaw (Piano)
- John Large (Baritone)
- Roe Van Boskirk (Piano)
- Clyde Tipton (Basso)
- Joan Summers (Soprano)
- Sheldon Shkolnik (Piano)
- Ruth McCoy Gatto (Soprano)
- David Garlock (Piano)
- Richard Allen (Baritone)
- Judith Allen (Soprano)
- Sylvia Chambless Patrick (Piano)
- Robert Preston (Piano)
- Ruth Glasser (Cello)
- James Stroud (Cello)

1966

- LaVergne Monette (Soprano)
- Lanoue Davenport (Flute)
- Almita Hyman-Vamos (Violin)
- Gisela Depkat (Cello)
- Eleanor Edwards (Soprano)
- Ellen Hassman (Cello)
- Virginia Marks (Piano)
- Jerome Rosen (Violin)
- Grayson Hirst (Tenor)
- Ronald Roseman (Oboe)

1967

- Mannes Trio
- John Cerminaro (Horn)
- Yehuda Hanani (Cello)
- Peter Basquin (Piano)
- Sivia Serrlya (Soprano)
- Romuald Tecco (Violin)
- Diane Walsh (Piano)
- Jody Lasky (Soprano)
- Christiane Edinger (Violin)

1968

- Jerome Bunke (Clarinet)
- Daniel Epstein (Piano)
- Barbara Chenault (Soprano)
- Natan Brand (Piano)
- Carmen Alvarez (Piano)
- Michael Haran (Cello)
- Shari Anderson (Soprano)

1969

- Ivan Oak (Tenor)
- Yolanda Roman (Soprano)
- Noelle Rogers (Soprano)
- Edith Kraft (Piano)
- Betty Jones (Soprano)
- Sandra Darling (Soprano)
- Li-Ping Hsieh (Soprano)
- Paul Posnak (Piano)

=== 1970s ===
1970

- Marsha Heller (Oboe)
- Idith Zvi (Piano)
- Elaine Comparone (Harpsichord)
- Larry Graham (Piano)
- Irene Gubrud (Soprano)
- Gabriel Chodos (Piano)
- Yoko Nozaki (Piano)
- Gerardo Ribeiro (Violin)
- Justin Blasdale (Piano)

1971

- Etsuko Tazaki (Piano)
- David Stern (Clarinet)
- Marioara Trifan (Piano)
- Ani Kavafian (Violin)
- Robert Christesen (Baritone)
- Daniel Waitzman (Recorder and Baroque Flute)

1972

- David Oei (Piano)
- Pamela Mia Paul (Piano)
- Carol Wincenc (Flute)
- Paul Tobias (Cello)
- Richard Fredrickson (Double Bass)
- Pawel Checinski (Piano)
- Sung-Kil Kim (Baritone)
- Susan Davenny Wyner (Soprano)
- Donald Green (Cello)

1973

- Nancy Evers (Soprano)
- Andrew Rangell (Piano)
- Jane Hamborsky (Clarinet)
- Harvey Pittel (Saxophone)
- David Shifrin (Clarinet)
- Susan Salm (Cello)
- Marian Hahn (Piano)
- Amanza Trio
- Sandra N. Miller (Flute)

1974

- Karen Johnson (Mezzo-Soprano)
- Alan Weiss (Piano)
- Emanuel Gruber (Cello)
- Gary Steigerwalt (Piano)
- David Northington (Piano)
- Robin McCabe (Piano)
- Arioso Wind Quintet
- Manuel Barrueco (Guitar)

1975

- Nancy Green (Cello)
- Peter Corey (Guitar)
- Laufman Duo
- Annette Parker (Soprano)
- Raphael Trio

1976

- Stephanie Jutt (Flute)
- Wendy Gillespie (Viola da gamba)
- Katherine Ciesinski (Mezzo-Soprano)
- Mary Elizabeth Stephenson (Piano)
- Stewart Newbold (Clarinet)
- Pamela Guidetti (Flute)
- Jacob Krichaf (Piano)
- William Grubb (Cello)
- Mary Springfels (Viola da gamba)
- David Hart (Flute)
- Lucy Cross (Lute)
- William Black (Piano)
- Eugene Drucker (Violin)
- Peter Becker (Countertenor)

1977

- Lois Shapiro (Piano)
- Michael Thomopoulos (Piano)
- Quintet Di Legno
- Karen Buranskas (Cello)
- Daisietta Kim (Soprano)
- Chang/Kogan Duo
- Franck Avril (Oboe)
- William Hoyt (Horn)

1978

- Michael Boriskin (Piano)
- Trio D’Accordo
- Dieuwke Schreuder (Cello)
- Beverly Morgan (Mezzo-Soprano)
- Ralph Evans (Violin)
- Gwendolyn Bradley (Soprano)
- Sonos Chamber Ensemble
- Rita Knuesel (Saxophone)
- James Miller (Trumpet)

1979

- Tyra Gilb (Flute)
- David Jolley (Horn)
- Sioned Williams (Harp)
- Marie Laferriere (Mezzo-Soprano)
- Martha Hartman Whitmore (Soprano)
- Regina Mushabac (Cello)
- Janus Ensemble

=== 1980s ===
1980

- Laura Hunter (Saxophone)
- Christopher Green-Armytage (Piano)
- Julius Berger (Cello)
- Ann Hart (Mezzo-Soprano)
- Rhonda Rider (Cello)
- One Plus One (Violin/Viola Duo)
- John Feeney (Double Bass)
- Ingrid Jacoby (Piano)

1981

- William Waters (Guitar)
- Frederick Moyer (Piano)
- Caryl Thomas (Harp)
- Susan Svercek (Piano)
- Ann Mackay (Soprano)
- The Arden Trio
- John Anderson (Oboe)
- Ellen Lang (Soprano)
- Susan Rotholz (Flute)

1982

- Sara Faust (Piano)
- Jeani Muhonen (Flute)
- Ofra Harnoy (Cello)
- Barry Douglas (Piano)
- Michael Collins (Clarinet)
- Gail Dobish (Soprano)
- Barbara Martin (Mezzo-Soprano)
- Alexander String Quartet

1983

- Ensemble Chanterelle
- Stephen Drury (Piano)
- Timothy Landauer (Cello)
- Linda Kobler (Harpsichord)
- Mary Ann Hart (Mezzo-Soprano)
- John Harle (Saxophone)
- Thomas Gallant (Oboe)
- Beacon Brass Quintet
- Helen Campo (Flute)

1984

- Carl Kleinsteuber (Tuba)
- Bowdoin Trio
- Douglas Wm. Walter (Marimba and Vibraphone)
- Carol Smith (Soprano)
- Steven Jordheim (Saxophone)
- Neil Rutman (Piano)
- Joseph Lulloff (Saxophone)

1985

- Margaret Poyner (Soprano)
- Joanna Picker (Cello)
- David Bilger (Trumpet)
- Kim Scholes (Cello)
- Sarah Kwak (Violin)
- George Mgrdichian (Oud)
- David Krakauer (Clarinet)
- Peggy Pearson (Oboe)

1986

- Maria Bachmann (Violin)
- Marie-Luise Neunecker (Horn)
- Marina Piccinini (Flute)
- Los Angeles Guitar Quartet

1987

- Hakan Rosengren (Clarinet)
- Semyon Fridman (Cello)
- Robert Swensen (Tenor)
- William Kanengiser (Guitar)

1988

- Alan Chow (Piano)
- Rorianne Schrade (Piano)
- Carol Meyer (Soprano)
- The Block Ensemble (Wind Quintet)

1989

- Charlotte Hellekant (Mezzo-soprano)
- Marie-Pierre Langlamet (Harp)

=== 1990s ===
1990

- Washington Barella (Oboe)
- Meridian Arts Ensemble (Brass Quintet plus Percussion)

1991

- Lauren Wagner (Soprano)

1992

- Miami String Quartet
- Aldo Abreu (Recorder)
- New Century Saxophone Quartet
- Jon Klibonoff (Piano)

1993

- Mia Chung (Piano)
- Ayako Yoshida (Violin)

1994

- Jennifer Koh (Violin)

1995

- Mariko Anraku (Harp)
- Laurel Trio (Piano Trio)

1996

- Joseph Lin (Violin)
- Douglas Webster (Baritone)
- Marko Ylonen (Cello)
- Scott Lee (Viola)

1997

- Pacifica String Quartet
- Meliora Winds

1998

- Katona Twins (Guitar Duo)
- Eighth Blackbird
- Judith Ingolfsson (Violin)

1999

- Nanae Mimura (Marimba)
- James Lent (Piano)
- Avalon String Quartet

=== 2000s ===
2000

- Mark Uhlemann (Bass-Baritone)
- Anthony Padilla (Piano)

2001

- Alpin Hong (Piano)
- Christina Jennings (Flute)
- Backbeat Percussion Quartet
- Imani Winds
- Trio Johannes

2002

- Peter Kolkay (Bassoon)
- Antares (Violin, Cello, Clarinet, Piano Quartet)
- Michi Wiancko (Violin)
- Thomas Meglioranza (Baritone)

2003

- Asmira Woodward-Page (Violin)
- Svetoslav Stoyanov (Percussion)
- Tanya Bannister (Piano)
- Enso String Quartet

2004

- QNG–Quartet New Generation (Recorder Collective)
- Krista River (Mezzo-Soprano)
- Soyeon Lee (Piano)

2005

- Jessica Lee (Violin)
- Soo Bae (Cello)
- Parker String Quartet

2006

- Jennifer Stumm (Viola)
- Amstel Quartet (Saxophones)
- Brasil Guitar Duo
- Janaki String Trio
- Jade Simmons (Piano)

2007

- Sarah Wolfson (Soprano)
- Carducci String Quartet
- Daria Rabotkina (Piano)
- Bridget Kibbey (Harp)
- Phyllis Chen (Toy piano/Piano)

2008

- Claire Chase (Flute)
- Afiara String Quartet

2009

- Calmus (Vocal ensemble)
- Ching-Yun Hu (Piano)
- Sebastian Baverstam (Cello)
- Hye-Jin Kim (Violin)

=== 2010s ===
2010

- Michael Brown (Piano)
- Mischa Bouvier (Baritone)
- Linden String Quartet

2011

- Naomi O’Connell (Mezzo-Soprano)
- Sybarite5
- Amphion String Quartet

2012

- Jay Campbell (Cello)
- Steven Lin (Piano)
- Lysander Piano Trio
- WindSync (Wind Quintet)

2013

- Donald Sinta Quartet
- Alexi Kenney (Violin)
- Ko-Eun Yi (Piano)
- PUBLIQuartet

2014

- In Mo Yang (Violin)
- Fei-Fei Dong (Piano)
- Brandon Ridenour (Trumpet)

2015

- Daniel Hsu (Piano)
- Verona Quartet

2016

- Jiji (Guitar)
- Yoonah Kim (Clarinet)
- Sam Suggs (Double Bass)

2017

- Argus Quartet
- Dominic Cheli (Piano)
- YooJin Jang (Violin)

2018

- Wynona Wang (Piano)
- Mitya Nilov (Percussion)
- Aizuri Quartet
- Invoke (Multi-String Quartet)

2019

- Jamal Aliyev (Cello)
- Jordan Bak (Viola)
- Tabea Debus (Recorder)
- Merz Trio

=== 2020s ===
2020

- Britton-Rene Collins (Percussion)
- Ariel Horowitz (Violin)
- Geneva Lewis (Violin)
- Gabriel Martins (Cello)
- Empire Wild

2021

- Balourdet Quartet
- Evren Ozel (Piano)
- Adam Sadberry (Flute)
- Chromic Duo
- Ariel Lanyi (Piano)
- Charlotte Saluste-Bridoux (Violin)
- Benjamin Manis (Conductor)
- Kyle Dickson (Conductor)
- Michelle Di Russo (Conductor)

2022

- Magdalena Kuźma (Soprano)
- Galvin Cello Quartet
- Eleni Katz (Bassoon)
- Llewellyn Sanchez-Werner (Piano)
- Jonathan Leibovitz (Clarinet)
