= Massimo Drechsler =

Massimo Drechsler (* before 1970) is a German percussionist and drummer, music teacher and university lecturer of Italian origin.

== Life ==
Drechsler studied percussion at the Hamburg University of Music and Theatre with Robert Hinze and Gernot Schulz and has been with the Hamburg Philharmonic State Orchestra since 1989. Among other things, he taught at the Hamburg Conservatory from 1989 to 1999 and at the Lübeck Academy of Music from 1999 to 2008. From 2003 Drechsler also taught at the Hamburg University of Music and Theatre as a major professor. Initially he acted there as a replacement for the late Joachim Winkler. The professorship was eventually filled by Drechsler. His students include, for example, Olaf Koep, Johannes Simmat, Andy Limpio, Sönke Schreiber and Fabian Otten.

Besides the field of classical music, he appears across styles in various musical bands and crossover projects. For example, he played in the German speed and power metal band Helloween as well as in the Hamburg percussion ensemble ElbtonalPercussion. Drechsler has been involved in numerous record productions as a drummer and percussionist.
