= Nena del Rosario-Villanueva =

Filipino pianist (1935–2021)

Nena Del Rosario-Villanueva
- Born: Natividad del Rosario; September 22, 1935
- Died: June 4, 2021 (aged 85)
- Education: Curtis Institute of Music
- Spouse(s): Generoso Villanueva, Jr.
- Awards: Gawad CCP Sining Pantanghalan (1997)

Nena Del Rosario-Villanueva (September 22, 1935 – June 4, 2021) was a Filipino pianist.

== Personal life and education ==
Natividad del Rosario was born on September 22, 1935, and married Generoso Villanueva Jr. with whom she bore five children.

Starting at the age of eleven, Del Rosario studied at the Curtis Institute of Music in Philadelphia, United States. Among her teachers were Isabelle Vengerova, Vladimir Horowitz, and Ilona Kabos. She graduated in 1956 receiving the Artist's Diploma, and was the first Filipino to finish studies in that said institution.

== Death ==
Del Rosario died on June 4, 2021, at the age of eighty-five.
