= Hilary Purrington =

American composer (born 1990)

- Born: 1990 (age 35–36); Massachusetts, United States
- Education: Shepherd School of Music (Rice University); The Juilliard School; Yale School of Music
- Occupation: Composer

Hilary Purrington is a composer known for writing chamber, vocal, and orchestral works. She is a faculty member at the Juilliard School, where she serves as Extension Composition Chair.

== Early life ==
Purrington attended Longmeadow High School in Longmeadow, Massachusetts. She graduated in 2009.

Purrington began arranging and composing choral music while in high school. In 2008, Purrington attended Interlochen Arts Camp, where she studied music composition with composer Roshanne Etezady.

In 2009, Purrington received an ASCAP Foundation Morton Gould Young Composer Award.

== Education ==
Purrington completed her undergraduate studies at the Shepherd School of Music at Rice University. Purrington went on to earn a master's degree at The Juilliard School. Following her time at Juilliard, Purrington earned a second master's degree from Yale School of Music. While studying at Yale, Purrington sang and toured with the professional choir Yale Schola Cantorum.

== Notable Commissions ==
Purrington won the American Composers Orchestra's 2017 Underwood Commission, receiving a commission to write a new work. The resulting work, Harp of Nerves, a guitar concerto composed for Jiji Guitar, was premiered by American Composers Orchestra at Carnegie Hall's Zankel Hall on November 13, 2019.

In 2018, the Philadelphia Orchestra announced it would commission a new work from Purrington. The commissioned work, Words for Departure for choir and orchestra, was supported by a grant from the Virginia B. Toulmin Foundation Orchestral Commissions Program. Words for Departure was premiered by the Atlanta Symphony in 2022 at Nathalie Stutzmann's debut concert as the ensemble's new music director.

In 2023, New Camerata Opera commissioned One Train, an animated children's opera featuring a libretto by Hannah McDermott and animation by Catarata. Together, Purrington and McDermott conceived a story that takes place entirely in a New York City subway car.

In May 2024, the Juilliard Orchestra and conductor Marin Alsop premiered Sercy, a new work commissioned by The Juilliard School.

== Awards and recognition ==
Purrington is the winner of an Underwood Commission, a Virginia B. Toulmin Foundation Orchestral Commission, a Charles Ives Scholarship from the American Academy of Arts and Letters, a Leonard Bernstein Award from the ASCAP Foundation, and the Woods Chandler Memorial Prize from Yale School of Music. She has received additional prizes and recognition from the Melodia Women's Choir, the New England Philharmonic, and the Sioux City Symphony Orchestra.

== Collaboration with Mo Willems ==
In 2019, Hyperion Books for Children released Because, a children's book written by Mo Willems and illustrated by Amber Ren. Purrington, who inspired the book's narrative, composed an original piano piece for the book. Purrington's composition, "The Cold," is included in the book's illustrations and end pages.

== Selected works ==
=== Orchestral ===
- Sercy (2024)
- as firmament to fin (2021)
- Above the Last Cloud (2019)
- Daylights (2017)
- Likely Pictures in Haphazard Sky (2016)

=== Wind Ensemble ===
- Apricity (2023)

=== Concerto ===
- Harp of Nerves for guitar and orchestra (2019)

=== Vocal and Choral ===
- The dark and marvelous way (2024)
- Stars like goldfish (2023)
- John Eason Stops Preaching (2018)
- Beyond the daily mist of our minds (2018)

=== Opera ===
- One Train (2023)
