= Rafael Minaskanian =

- Born: 19 December 1941 (age 84); Tehran, Iran
- Origin: Iran
- Occupations: Pianist, musician
- Instrument: Piano

Rafael Minaskanian (Persian: رافائل میناسکانیان, born 19 December 1941) is an Iranian musician and pianist with Armenian background. He is the first artist whose classical piano recital has been broadcast on Iranian Television.

== Biography ==
Rafael Minaskanian was born in Tehran to Armenian and music-loving families. His mother played the piano and his father the violin, and Rafael began playing music at the age of six. His first piano teacher was Ms. Hagh Nazarian and then he became a student of Emanuel Melik-Aslanian. He took the stage for the first time at the age of ten, and as a teenager performed the first classical piano recital live on the newly launched Iranian National Television. He completed his primary education in a French private school and his secondary education in Firooz Bahram High School. After graduating, he went to the United States to study medicine, but after two years, with the guidance and encouragement of Ab Zerko, piano teacher and piano director, he studied music.

After living in the US for several years, Minaskanian went to England in 1960 and made many trips to Italy, but returned to Iran with the Islamic Revolution. During these years he worked with several world-renowned masters, including Karl Ulrich Schnabel, Austrian pianist in Italy, and Ilona Kabos, British pianist in London.

The Minaskanians performed for the first time in London at the Presley Hall of the Royal Festival Hall, which was critically acclaimed. Well-known critic Eric Warr described him as "futuristic" and his artistic and technical ability as mature, passionate, brilliant and very clean. After Minaskanian returned to Iran, Arno Babajanian, a well-known Armenian composer and pianist, invited him to collaborate with him on the public performance of his work "Armenian Rhapsody for Two Pianos" at the University of Tehran.

Minaskanian has been teaching music at the Azad University and then the University of Tehran since 1993, and for the past two decades has been involved in education and performance (solo, chamber, and orchestra) in Iran, European countries, and the United States.

Minaskanian performed as a soloist at several music events with the Armenian String orchestra during the birthday of Aram Khachaturian, a prominent Armenian composer. In addition to educational and executive work, Minaskanian also engages in social activities and launches a variety of programs for humanitarian and educational purposes. He held two piano recitals in memory of his teacher, Emanuel Melik-Aslanian, for the benefit of special patients. Also in July 2013, together with the Parsian Orchestra, he held a concert in honor of Melik-Aslanian called "Beethoven Night" at Vahdat Hall, which was well received by classical music lovers. In the spring of 2016, he performed a solo in Hafez Hall in Shiraz and also held a piano training workshop. In his piano recital at the 31st Fajr International Music Festival at Vahdat Hall, he was enthusiastically received by the audience.

In 2019, Rafael Minaskanian was awarded the First Class Art Award of the Ministry of Culture and Islamic Guidance of Iran.
