= Árpád Szendy =

Hungarian pianist (1863–1922)

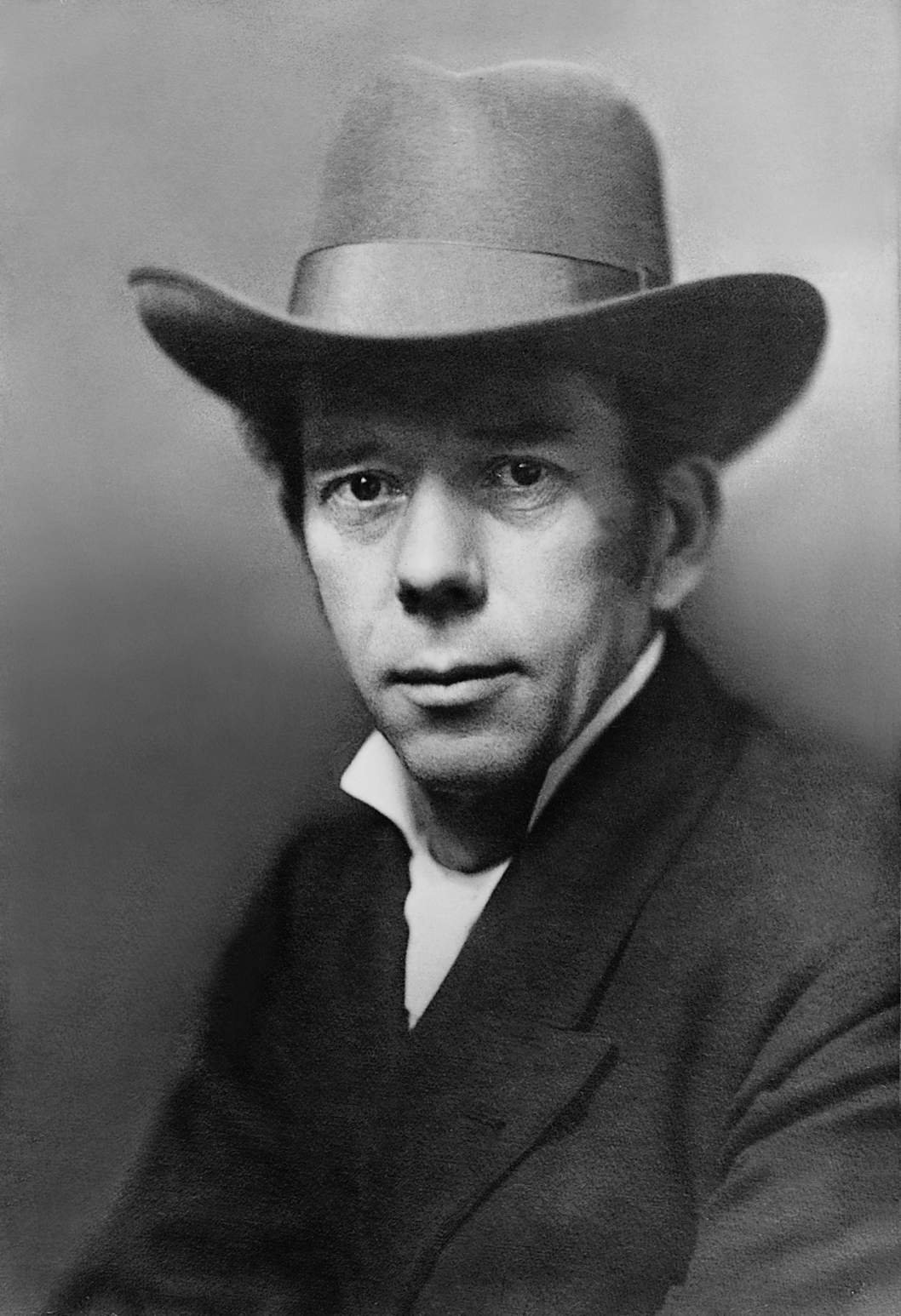
- Szendy, c. 1900
- Born: 11 August 1863; Debrecen, Kingdom of Hungary, Austrian Empire
- Died: 10 September 1922 (aged 59); Budapest, Hungary
- Education: Franz Liszt Academy of Music
- Occupations: Classical pianist; Composer; Academic teacher
- Organizations: Franz Liszt Academy of Music

Árpád Szendy ([ˈaːrpaːd ˈsɛndi]; (11 August 1863 – 10 September 1922 in Budapest) was a Hungarian pianist, composer and academic teacher.

== Biography ==
Szendy was born in Szarvas on 11 August 1863. His father was a college professor. The original name of the family was Golnhofer. Szendy studied with Henri Gobbi, Franz Liszt and Hans Koessler at the Franz Liszt Academy of Music in Budapest. From 1888, he taught piano at the academy, becoming a full professor in 1891. In 1920, he was appointed director of the academy, but resigned a year later for health reasons. Szendy had many students; the best-known one is Ilona Kabos.

Szendy's compositions include several orchestral pieces, a piano concerto, a concert fantasy for piano and orchestra, the opera "Mária", two string quartets, and a variety of piano pieces and songs. His editions of Carl Czerny's etudes "School of Finger Dexterity" were used for a century in Hungary.

Szendy died in Budapest of heart disease in 1922.
