= Sue Alexander =

Sue Alexander may refer to:

- Sue Alexander (writer)
- Sue Alexander (tennis)

== See also ==
- Susan Alexander-Max, American-born British fortepianist
- Suzanne Alexander (1931–1975), Canadian actress and model
