= Janaki String Trio =

US musical group

The Janaki String Trio was founded at the Colburn School in 2005. The string trio is based in Los Angeles, California. The Janaki quickly rose to prominence with a repertoire displaying a vast range from Beethoven to Penderecki.

In 2006, the Janaki won the Concert Artists Guild International Competition, becoming the first string trio to receive the honor since 1978 .

Members of the Janaki have studied with Kim Kashkashian, Isodore Cohen, Sylvia Rosenberg, and the Guarneri Quartet, the Juilliard String Quartet, the Cleveland Quartet, the Orion String Quartet, and the Takacs Quartet. Currently, the Janaki studies individually and collectively with Robert Lipsett, Paul Coletti, and Ronald Leonard.

== Members ==
- Serena McKinney – violin
- Katie Kadarauch – viola
- Arnold Choi – violoncello

== Awards and recognition ==
- Winner, 2006 Concert Artists Guild International Competition
- Recipient, 2006 BMI Foundation Commission Prize (awarded through Concert Artists Guild)
- Winner, 2005 Annual Coleman Chamber Music Competition

== Recordings ==
- Wanhal (Vanhal) Quartets: Uwe Grodd and the Janaki String Trio. Naxos Records (2007)
- The Janaki String Trio: Beethoven, Penderecki, and Barabba. Yarlung Records (2006)
