= Ariel Lanyi =

Israeli classical pianist

Ariel Lanyi אריאל לני
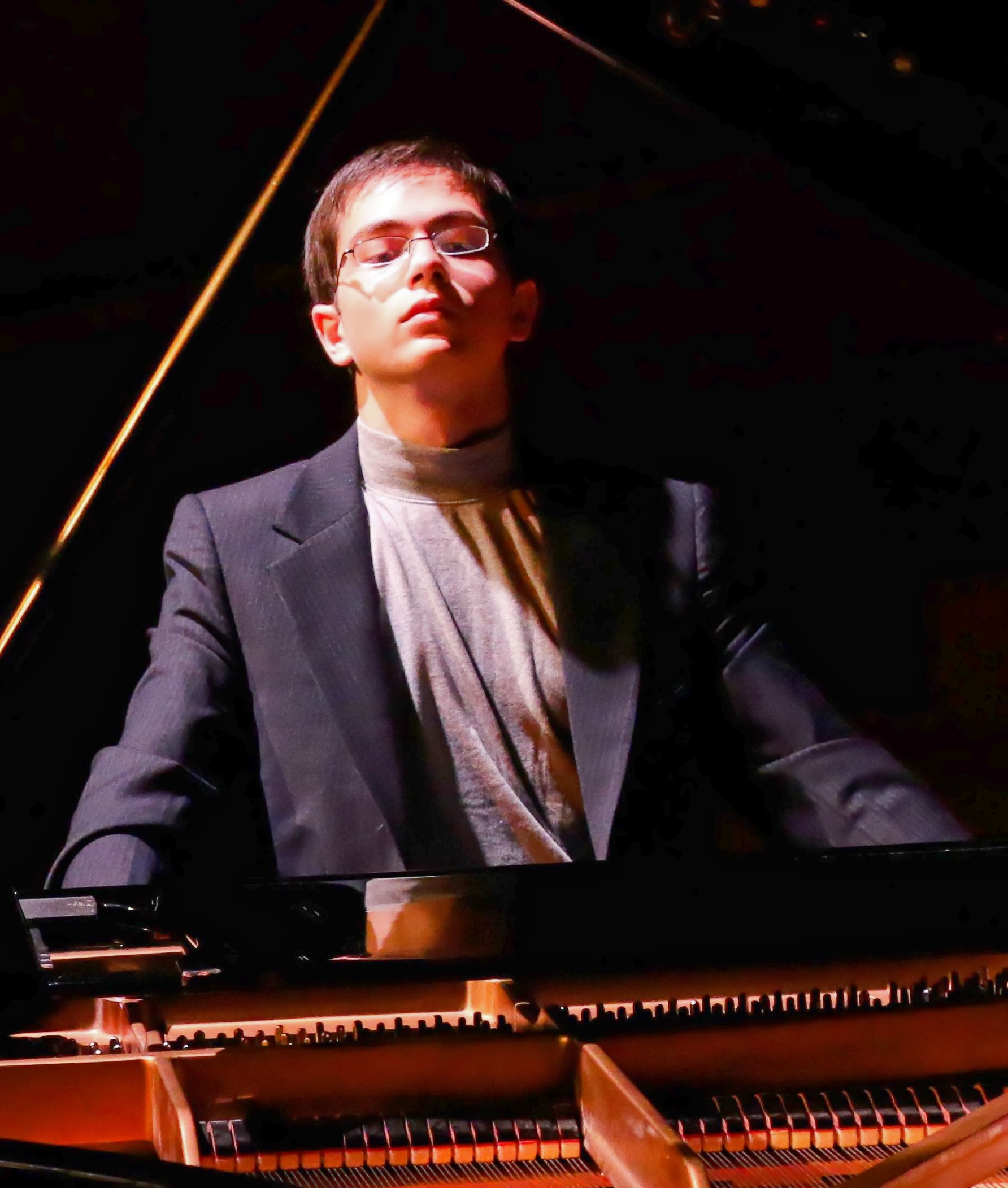

Background information
- Born: October 10, 1997 (age 28); Jerusalem, Israel
- Genres: Classical
- Occupation: Pianist
- Website: ariellanyi.com

Ariel Lanyi (Hebrew: אריאל לני; born 10 October 1997) is a London-based classical pianist born in Israel.

== Biography ==
Ariel Lanyi was born in Jerusalem. He studied piano at the Conservatory of the Jerusalem Academy of Music and Dance with Lea Agmon and Yuval Cohen, as well as violin, composition, conducting, and jazz. He started performing as a pianist at age 5, played with an orchestra for the first time at age 6, started regular appearances on live broadcasts on Israel Radio at age 8, and was featured in several documentaries, including the ITV documentary Superhuman Genius. He subsequently studied piano at the Royal Academy of Music in London with Hamish Milne and Ian Fountain. In addition, he received tuition from eminent artists such as Imogen Cooper, Richard Goode, Robert Levin, Murray Perahia, Leif Ove Andsnes, as well as the late Ivan Moravec and Leon Fleisher.

In 2021, Lanyi won third prize at the Leeds International Piano Competition, and was a finalist at the Arthur Rubinstein International Piano Master Competition. In the same year, he was a prize winner at the inaugural Young Classical Artists Trust (London) and Concert Artists Guild (New York) International Auditions. In 2023, Lanyi was chosen by a panel chaired by Rudolf Buchbinder to be awarded the Prix Serdang, a prize of 50,000 CHF given to a young pianist. In 2024, as part of the Next Generation Mozart Soloists project, Lanyi released a recording of the two Mozart Concert Rondos with Howard Griffiths and the Mozarteumorchester Salzburg. In 2025, Linn Records released Organ Reflections, a recording of piano music influenced by the organ by Mozart, Franck, and Reger.

In addition to giving recitals in multiple countries, he has played with orchestras such as the Israel Philharmonic Orchestra, the City of Birmingham Symphony Orchestra, and the Royal Liverpool Philharmonic Orchestra, and has collaborated with conductors such as Trevor Pinnock, Andrew Manze, Peter Whelan, and Yi-An Xu. As a chamber musician, he has collaborated with eminent artists such as Charles Neidich, Torleif Thedéen, Noah Bendix-Balgley, and has participated in the Marlboro Music Festival.

Lanyi received critical acclaim for performances of Haydn, Beethoven, Schubert and Bartók.

Lanyi resides in London.

== Recordings ==
- Schubert: Moments Musicaux D. 780 and Piano Sonata, D. 850. Linn Records, 2021 (CKD 663). OCLC 1293236409
- Mozart, Wolfgang Amadeus; Dalene, Johan; Ringstad, Eivind; Zanetta, Alexandre; Lanyi, Ariel; Griffiths, Howard; Mozarteum-Orchester (Salzbourg) (2024), Mozart (in no linguistic content), [France], [France]: Alpha classics. Outhere music France, OCLC 1454702744
- Organ Reflections – Mozart, Franck, Reger (Linn Records, 2025)
