= Daniel Waitzman =

American flutist and composer (born 1943)

Daniel Robert Waitzman (born July 15, 1943) is an American flutist and composer.

== Early life and education ==
Born in Rochester, New York, Waitzman grew up in New York City, where he graduated from the High School of Music and Art in 1961. At Columbia College (B.A. 1965), he majored in Music. He received his M.A. in musicology from Columbia University in 1968. Waitzman studied recorder with Bernard Krainis, Baroque Flute with Claude Monteux and Paul Ehrlich, and modern flute with Samuel Baron, Harold Bennett, and Harry Moskovitz. He studied composition with Otto Luening, harmony and counterpoint with Charles Walton, Genevieve Chinn, and Peter Westergaard, orchestration with Howard Shanet, and musicology with Paul Henry Lang.

== Career ==
Waitzman's professional career began in 1959, when he made the first of several recordings with his teacher, Bernard Krainis, at the age of 15. In 1962, he recorded a Frescobaldi Canzona with Krainis and lutenist Joseph Iodine on the Baroque one-keyed flute. This performance appeared on a recording entitled The Virtuoso Recorder.

In 1965, Waitzman had a bell key (originally invented by Carl Dolmetsch) fitted to his recorder; and he began to develop a new technique for playing the bell-keyed recorder. He arranged three of J.S. Bach’s Organ Trio Sonatas for bell-keyed recorder and harpsichord, and also arranged J.S. Bach’s E Major Violin Concerto for bell-keyed recorder and strings. It was around this time that he became dissatisfied with the early music movement’s philosophical approach to the performance of the older repertoire, and also with the limitations of the one-keyed “Baroque” flute. Later, he published several critiques of the modern early music movement, including a book entitled Up from Authenticity, or How I Learned to Love the Metal Flute—A Personal Memoir. The original essay on which this book was based served as the subject for a feature article in The New York Times in 1990. In an article published in The American Recorder in 1980, Waitzman had called for a more flexible approach to the performance of early music.

In 1971, Waitzman acquired an antique conical Boehm flute built ca. 1875 by Louis Lot. That same year, he made his formal début in Carnegie Recital Hall as a winner of the Concert Artists Guild Award, at which he performed on recorder, Baroque flute, and conical Boehm flute. Waitzman has taught flute and recorder at Queens College, CUNY, and at Hofstra University.

In 1973–74, Waitzman persuaded the brothers Bickford and Robert Brannen to revive the manufacture of conical Boehm flutes. This project led to the establishment of the flute-making firm of Brannen Brothers.

By 1976 Waitzman became convinced that it was possible to play the modern flute in a manner consistent with the aesthetic requirements of the older repertoire, using a type of embouchure very close to that of Boehm, the original inventor of the modern flute. He established himself as a performer on modern flute, and gave numerous recitals illustrating the history of the flute.

Waitzman has toured the United States and Canada as soloist and chamber musician. In 1976, he performed several of Vivaldi's Piccolo Recorder concerti with Amor Artis at Alice Tully Hall. The New York Times reviewer Raymond Ericson called his performance of the A Minor Concerto “nothing short of miraculous.” He has served as soloist and chamber musician on flutes and recorders with The Long Island Baroque Ensemble since 1974, and performed several concerts with the Bach Aria Group, including a Telemann Concerto for Recorder and Flute (with his teacher, flutist Samuel Baron).

In 1978, Waitzman published The Art of Playing the Recorder, a codification of the technique of both bell-keyed and keyless recorders. He had tried to convince recorder makers to offer a series of bell-keyed recorders expressly designed to take advantage of the bell key, and had suggested that they undertake the development of a modernized recorder; and their failure to do so caused him to turn more and more to the Boehm flute, in both their conically and cylindrically bored forms, as his primary instrument. In 1980, he was awarded an International Bach Society Performance Award. In 1987, he received a National Endowment for the Arts Solo Recitalist Fellowship Grant to give a recital in New York's Alice Tully Hall.

After pondering the current state of contemporary music, and the history of music since the Enlightenment, Waitzman turned his attention to the composition of new music in 1992, in a revival of what he considered the old masters.

== Partial list of books and essays ==
- “The Decline of the Recorder in the 18th Century,” The American Recorder, Vol. VIII, No. 2, Spring 1967, pp. 47–51.
- The Decline of the Recorder in the Eighteenth Century, Columbia University Masters Essay, 1968.
- “The Bell Key,” The American Recorder, Vol. IX, No. 1, Winter 1968, pp. 3–6.
- “The Requirements of a good Bell-Keyed Recorder,” The American Recorder, Vol. XII, No. 2, Spring 1971, pp. 39–40.
- "A Plan to Promote the Development of a Modernized Recorder," The American Recorder, Vol. XII, No. 3, August 1971, pp. 71–72.
- The Art of Playing the Recorder, New York: A.M.S. Press, 1978.
- “Historical vs. Musical Authenticity: A Performer’s View,” The American Recorder, Vol. XXI, No. 1, May 1980, pp. 11–13.
- Up from Authenticity, or How I Learned to Love the Metal Flute—A Personal Memoir, Amazon Kindle Book, 2012.

== Partial list of musical compositions ==
- Sonata in G Major for Flute and Harpsichord or Fortepiano, or Pianoforte (1993).
- Sonata in D Minor for Flute and Harpsichord or Fortepiano, or Pianoforte (1994).
- Organ Trio Sonata in C Minor, Dedicated to Samuel Baron, co-composer of BWV 1032 (1993).
- Organ Trio Sonata in F Major (1993).
- Organ Trio Sonata in C Major (1994–95).
- Sonata in E♭ Major for Flute and Harpsichord or Fortepiano, or Pianoforte (1995).
- Canzona in G Major for Flute, Violin or Oboe, and Basso Continuo (1996).
- Canzona in D Major for 2 Flutes, Oboes, Violins, Cornetti, or Other Instruments, and Basso Continuo, by Daniel Robert Waitzman (1996).
- Quartet in D Minor for 2 Violins, Viola, and Violoncello, in memoriam Otto Luening (1997).
- Fantasia in D Major for Harpsichord, Fortepiano, or Pianoforte (1997).
- Trio Sonata in B Major for Flute or Violin, Oboe d’Amore or Violin, and Basso Continuo, In Memoriam Samuel Baron (1997).
- Pavan in G Minor for 2 Violins, Viola, and Violoncello, or Other Instruments, in memoriam Bernard Krainis (2006).
- "The day is gone, and all its sweets are gone!" text by John Keats, for Soprano and Fortepiano, Pianoforte, or Harpsichord (1998–2001).
- Grand Sonata in A Major for Flute and obbligato Fortepiano, Harpsichord, or Pianoforte, In Memoriam Samuel Baron (1998).
- Trio in B Major for 2 Violins (or Violin or Oboe, and Viola or Viola d'Amore), and Violoncello or Basso Continuo, In Memoriam Charles M. Walton (2004).
- Canzona in E Major for 2 Violins, or other treble instruments, and Basso Continuo, In Memoriam Betty Krainis (2006).
- Four Songs to Poems by Nicholas Kalkines Andrian, for Soprano or Countertenor and Pianoforte or Harpsichord, by Daniel Waitzman. Dedicated to Nicholas Kalkines Andrian and Joyce Pytkowicz (2007).
- Sonata in D Minor for Viola and Pianoforte, Fortepiano, or Harpsichord. (2008), dedicated to Louise Schulman.
- Quartet in B♭ Major for Flute or Violin, Viola, Pianoforte, Fortepiano, or Harpsichord, and Violoncello (2008). Dedicated to Doris Konig, artistic director of The Omega Ensemble.
- Symphony in F Major for 2 Violins, Viola, Violoncello, Contrabass, and Harpsichord, Dedicated to Gerald Ranck (2008).
- Concerto in D Minor for Harpsichord, Fortepiano, or Pianoforte, 2 Violins, Viola, Violoncello, and Contrabass, dedicated to Gerald Ranck (2009).
- Sonata in G Major for Violin or Oboe, and Harpsichord, Fortepiano, or Pianoforte (1994, 2009). Also published as a B♭ Major Flute Sonata.
- Sonata in G Major for Violoncello and Fortepiano, Pianoforte, or Harpsichord (2010).
- Canzona in D-Dorian Minor (in the Learned Style), with a Finalis on G, for 2 Treble Instruments and Basso Continuo (2013).
- Quartet in D Major for Flute, 2 Violins, Viola, and Violoncello (2011,2015).
- Trio Sonata Movement in C Major for Flute or Violin, Violin, Viola, or Viola d’Amore, or Basso Continuo or Violoncello Solo (2014).
- Trio Sonata in A Major for Flute or Violin, Viola d’Amore or Viola, and Bass or optional Basso Continuo (2014).
- Sonata in Bb for Flute or Violin and Fortepiano, Harpsichord, or Pianoforte (2016), in memoriam Gerald B. Ranck.
- Sonata in F Major for Clavichord, Fortepiano, Harpsichord, or Pianoforte (2017).
- Sonata in G Major for Flute (or Violin) and Fortepiano, Harpsichord, or Pianoforte, In One Movement. In Memoriam Sonia Gezairlian Grib (2018).
- Fantasia in G Major for Fortepiano, Harpsichord, Pianoforte, Clavichord, or Tangentenflügel. (2018.)

== Partial discography ==
The Festive Pipes: Five Centuries of Dance Music for Recorders—Krainis Recorder Consort, Kapp Records KCL-9034 (1959).

The Festive Pipes, Volume 2: Eight Centuries of Music for Recorders—Krainis Recorder Consort, Kapp Records KCL-9049 (1960).

Sweet Pipes: Five Centuries of Recorder Music—Bernard Krainis with the Krainis Consort and Baroque Ensemble, Columbia Masterworks Stereo—MS 6475 (1962). (includes Waitzman's performance on Baroque Flute.)

Eighteenth-Century Flute Music (On Historic Instruments), Musical Heritage Society, MHS 1860 (1974). (Conical Boehm Flute, Baroque Flute, Bell-keyed Recorder.)

Franz Danzi: Flute Quartet in D Minor, Op. 56, No. 2; Flute Trio in G Mahor, Op. 71, No. 1--The Waitzman Flute Quartet, Musical Heritage Society, MHS 4687T (1982).

Scott Joplin, The Entertainer: Rags, Marches, and Waltzes—Trio Bell'Arte, Premier Recordings, PRCD 1043 (1995).

J.C.F. Bach (The Bückeburg Bach): Trios and Sonatas—Trio Bell'Arte, Premier Recordings, PRCD 1051 (1996).

Viva Italia: Monteverdi, Brioschi, Handel, Gorzanis, J.C. Bach, Dowland—The Queen's Chamber Band, 4Tay, CD 4011 (1998).

J.S. Bach, The Coffee Cantata: Cantatas 211, 158, and Motets—Amor Artis Chorale and Baroque Orchestra, Lyrachord Early Music Series, LEMS 8939 (1999).

Jean-Philippe Rameau: Pièces de Clavecin in Concerts (1741)--The Queens Chamber Band, Lyrachord Discs, LEMS 8040 (1999).
