= Sinta Quartet =

American saxophone quartet, established 2010

The Sinta Quartet is an American saxophone quartet, founded at the University of Michigan School of Music, Theatre & Dance in November 2010. All members of the quartet studied with the group's namesake, University of Michigan Professor of Saxophone Donald Sinta.

== Membership ==
The group's members are:

- Dan Graser - soprano saxophone
- Zachary Stern - alto saxophone
- Joseph Girard - tenor saxophone
- Danny Hawthorne-Foss - baritone saxophone

The Sinta Quartet is currently managed by General Arts Touring.

== Awards and recognition ==
- 2012, 1st Prize of the North American Saxophone Alliance Quartet Competition
- 2013, Alice Coleman Grand Prize of the Coleman Chamber Music Competition
- 2013, 1st Prize of the Concert Artists Guild Competition
- 2017, 1st Prize for Winds of the M-Prize Chamber Arts Competition
- 2018, Gold Medal at the Fischoff National Chamber Music Competition

== Recordings ==
- "Collider " Released June 9, 2019 on Concert Artists Guild Records.
- "Ex Machina" Release Date February 28, 2020 on Bright Shiny Things.
- "Sinta Quartet Plays Beethoven" Released December 15, 2023 on Bright Shiny Things.
