= Hamburger Konservatorium =

Coordinates: 53°34′50″N 9°47′50″E

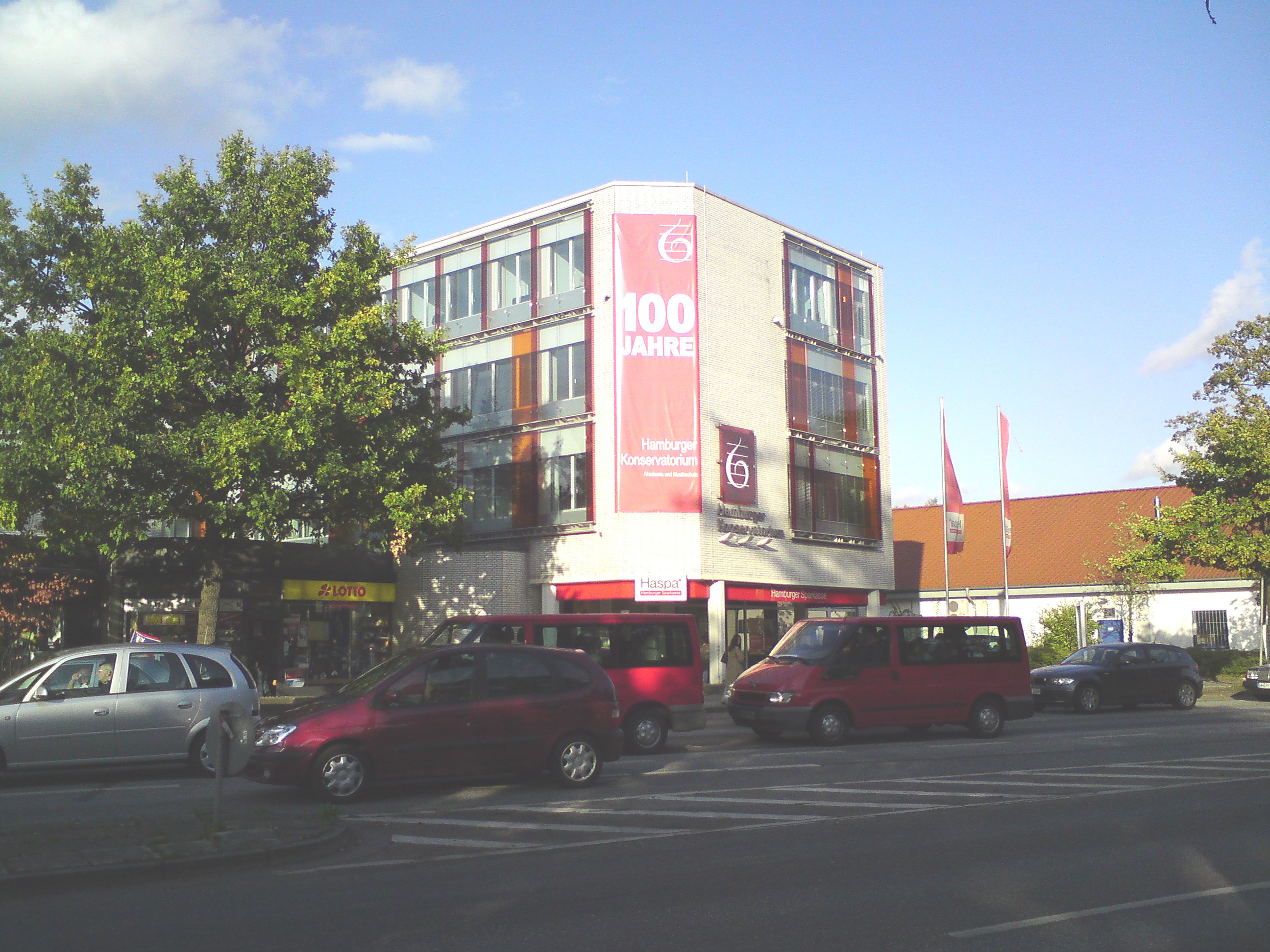
Building of Hamburger Konservatorium at the street of Sülldorfer Landstraße

The Hamburger Konservatorium is a music conservatory located in the Sülldorf quarter of Hamburg, and it is one of the largest private music schools in Germany. Established as the Klaer'sches Konservatorium für Musik in 1908, it is the oldest school of music in Northern Germany. The school offers a variety of courses, including undergraduate, graduate, and post-graduate diplomas under the umbrella of the conservatory's Music Academy, and courses for children and non-degree seeking adults of all ages under the umbrella of the conservatory's Music School. Mark Menke is the school's current director.

== Notable alumni ==
- Harry Adaskin, violinist
- Rainer Baumann, guitarist and composer
- Andreas Delfs, conductor
- Yared Dibaba, actor, author, and singer
- Henner Hoier, composer, singer, and guitarist
- Franz Knies, tenor
- G. Christian Lobback, organist and organ builder
- Emanuel Melik-Aslanian, composer and pianist
- Horst Mühlbradt, jazz musician and composer
- Helga Pilarczyk, soprano
- Herbert Rehbein, composer
- Michael Renkel, guitarist
- Susanne Rode-Breymann, musicologist
- Peter Ruzicka, composer and conductor
- Wolfgang-Andreas Schultz, composer
- Florian Tessloff, composer and arranger
- Claus Unzen, film, stage, and opera director

== Notable faculty ==
- Hugo Riemann, musicologist
- Marie-Agnes Dittrich, musicologist
- Simone Eckert, violist
- Sorin Enachescu, pianist
- Hans Haider, guitarist and composer
- Hans-Georg Lotz, composer
- Walter Niemann, composer
- Claudia Schwarze, cellist
- Klauspeter Seibel, conductor
- Michael Stricharz, violinist
