= John Bell Young =

- Born: July 8, 1953; New York City, US
- Died: April 8, 2017 (aged 63); Brattleboro, Vermont, United States
- Resting place: Cremated
- Occupations: Pianist, music critic, author
- Musical career
- Genres: Classical
- Instrument: Piano

John Bell Young (July 8, 1953 – April 8, 2017) was an American concert pianist, music critic and author, best known for his performances and recordings of the music of the Russian composer Alexander Scriabin.

== Early years, education and training ==
Young spent his childhood on the north shore of Long Island. His mother was a librarian, and his father, of Cherokee descent, was an amateur pianist and inventor. As a child, his first piano teachers were Miriam Freundlich, whose brother-in-law Irwin was chair of the piano division at Juilliard, and later Kyriena Siloti, the daughter of Russian pianist Alexander Siloti.

Following his graduation from Putney, Young continued his studies at the Oberlin College Conservatory of Music studying music, Russian, and philosophy. He attended Bennington College studying philosophy, French and Russian literature, and semiotics, and the Mannes College of Music where he was a student of Bruce Hungerford.

== Musical career ==
As a pianist be was best known for his performances and recordings of the music of Alexander Scriabin, earning the approval of Scriabin's daughters, Marina Scriabine and Yelena Scriabina Sofronitsky. He was also a consultant to the first Scriabin International Piano Competition in Moscow in 1995, where a special prize was awarded in his name.

Young first came to notice in 1990 with his recordings on Newport Classic of musical works by Friedrich Nietzsche, which were the first commercially issued discs of his piano and chamber music. Sony Classical has since acquired these recordings for eventual re-release. In 1992 he performed Nietzsche's music in Russia, thus ending a nearly 75-year ban of the philosopher's work.

Young built a reputation for playing the works of rarely performed composers.

In 2001, in collaboration with the British actor Michael York, he recorded Enoch Arden, a melodrama for narrator and piano by Richard Strauss, set to the narrative poem of Alfred, Lord Tennyson.

== Writing career and later life ==
Young was a critic for a number of newspapers and magazines, including the St. Petersburg Times, the American Record Guide, the Brattleboro Reformer, Music and Vision, Clavier, Piano, and Opera News.

Following a stroke in 2013 which left him unable to play, Young retired from performing. He continued to produce recordings for other artists as well as to endorse and advise young aspiring artists about their careers through his group Artistic Spirits Productions.

Young died in April 2017. He was pronounced dead on April 8, but indications are that he died some time before then as he lived alone. He died intestate, and he was insolvent at the time of his death.

== Publications ==
- Beethoven's Symphonies: A Guided Tour. Montclair, New Jersey: Amadeus Press. 2008. ISBN 9781574671698
- Brahms: A Listener's Guide. Montclair, New Jersey: Amadeus Press. 2008. ISBN 9781574671711
- Liszt: A Listener's Guide to His Piano Works. Montclair, New Jersey: Amadeus Press. 2009. ISBN 9781574671704
- Puccini: A Listener's Guide. Montclair, New Jersey: Amadeus Press. 2008. ISBN 9781574671728
- Schubert: A Survey of His Symphonic, Piano, and Chamber Music. Montlciar, New Jersey: Amadeus Press. 2009. ISBN 9781574671773
- The Music of Friedrich Nietzsche for Piano Four Hands. New York, N.Y.: HLH Music Publications. 1992. (Edited by John Bell Young)
- The Alexander Scriabin Companion: History, Performance, and Lore. (with Lincoln Ballard and Matthew Bengtson) Lanham, Maryland: Rowman & Littlefield. 2017. ISBN 9781442232617

== Recordings ==
- Prisms: Music of Scriabin, Mahler-Young, Leo Tolstoi, Hugh Downs, and Michel Block. John Bell Young, pianist. (Americus Records)
- Piano Music of Friedrich Nietzsche: John Bell Young, pianist, with assisting artist, Constance Keene, piano. (Newport Classic CD 85513)
- The Music of Friedrich Nietzsche: John Bell Young, pianist, with assisting artists John Aler, tenor; Nicholas Eanet, violin. (Newport Classic CD 85535)
- Alfred Lord Tennyson's Enoch Arden: A Melodrama Set to Music by Richard Strauss: Michael York, narrator; John Bell Young, pianist. (Americus Records CD 20021025)
