= Walter Niemann (composer) =

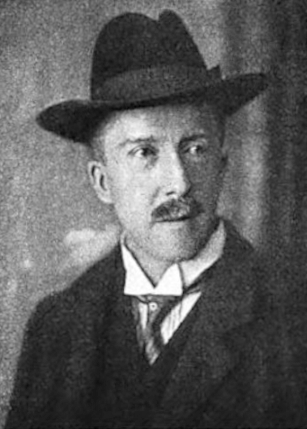
- Born: Walter Rudolph Niemann; 10 October 1876; Hamburg, Germany
- Died: 17 June 1953 (aged 76); Leipzig, Germany
- Education: Leipzig Conservatory; University of Leipzig
- Occupations: Composer, arranger, music critic

Walter Rudolph Niemann (10 October 1876 – 17 June 1953) was a German composer, arranger, and music critic.

== Life ==
Born in Hamburg, Niemann was the son of composer and virtuoso pianist Rudolph Niemann (1838–1898). His uncle, Gustav Adolph Niemann (1843–1881) was a violinist and important musical figure in Helsinki. Walter Niemann studied with Engelbert Humperdinck as a youth in Leipzig. He then entered the Leipzig Conservatory where he was a pupil of Carl Reinecke. He pursued doctoral studies in musicology at the University of Leipzig under Hugo Riemann and Hermann Kretzschmar, earning a doctorate in 1901. His dissertation was on early ligatures and mensural music.

Niemann first worked as a teacher in Hamburg then served as the editor of the Neue Zeitschrift für Musik in Leipzig from 1904 to 1906. From 1907 through 1917 he was a writer and critic for the Neueste Nachrichten in Leipzig. He also taught during those years on the faculty of the Hamburg Conservatory. In 1927, H. Abert in the Illustriertes Musiklexikon styled Niemann "The most important composer for piano today, who understands how to make music both fine and colored, although he often strays into the salon." He died in Leipzig, aged 76.

== Work ==
Niemann's compositions include 189 opus numbers, of which more than 150 are works for solo piano, chiefly of character pieces. He also composed violin sonata, several orchestral works, and some chamber music. Niemann was one of the very few German composers to explore Impressionist music. His works are characterized by color and exoticism, and the titles reflect interests in the past ("From Watteau's time", "Sanssouci" "Meissen porcelain"), and exotic subject matter on poetic titles ("Old China, Op. 62," "The Orchid Garden, Op. 67", "The Exotic Pavillon").

His book, "Masters of the Piano: past and present," published in 1919 is considered a classic. He also wrote popular biographies of composers; his biography of Brahms emphasized that composer's north German roots at the expense of his Viennese retirement and liberalism. As a reviewer he was outspoken in his criticism of "pathological" and "sensuous" composers like Richard Strauss, Mahler, and Arnold Schoenberg, and was threatened in 1910 with a libel suit by composer Max Reger. He praised nationalists and folk-influenced composers like Hans Pfitzner, Sibelius, and Edward MacDowell, and was influential in popularizing Scandinavian composers in Germany. Following the second world war, Niemann's artistic viewpoint and consequently his work fell out of favor.

== Selected compositions ==
Opus	Year	Title	Notes
6	1908	Meissner Porzellan	
35	19??	Rheinische Nachtmusik for strings and 2 horns	
46	1926	Im Kinderland: 19 ganz leichte Klavierstücke	
59		Masken: 20 Charakterstücke	
60	1919	Piano Sonata No. 1 "Romantic"	A-minor
62	1919	Alt China: 5 Traumdichtungen	1. Die Glocken der Pagode/2.Chinesiche Nacthtigall, etc.
73		Präeludium, Intermezzo und Fugue	
80		Die Jahreszieten. 21 Charakterstücke nach Hermann Bang	
81		4 Balladen	F-minor, E-minor, Eb-Major, G-minor
98		2 kleine Sonaten	d-minor, e-minor
102	1925	Kleine Suite "Suite miniature"	
106		Introduction und Toccata	
107	1926	Hamburg. 13 Charakterstücke	1. Haften/2. Spuk/3.Elternhaus/4. Disput /5. Matrosen/6. AD 1600/7. Brahms/8. Alter Michel/9. Drehorgel/10. Laterne/11. St. Pauli/12. Mondnacht/13. Hymnus
108		Pavane und Gavotte	
109		Galante Musik: 6 Stücke	1. Präludium/2.Sarabande/3.Gavotte/4. Gigue/5. Menuett/6. Rigaudon
111		Menuett und Bourreé	
118	1930	Variationen	
146	1936	Kleine Variationen über eine alt-irische Volksweise	In a footnote, he acknowledges the theme is Lilliburlero [sic] by Henry Purcell

== Writings (selected) ==
- Die Musik Skandinaviens (Leipzig, 1906)
- Edvard Grieg: Biographie und Würdigung seiner Werke (Leipzig 1908)
- Das Nordlandbuch (Weimar, 1909)
- Die Virginalmusik (Leipzig 1919)
- Die Musik der Gegenwart und der letzten Vergangenheit bis zu den Romantikern, Klassizisten und Neudeutschen, Schuster & Loeffler (5-8 printings), Berlin 1913, 303 pages.
- Das Klavierbuch, kurze Geschichte d. Klaviermusik u. ihrer Meister, d. Klavierbaues u. d. Klavierliteratur. Mit Tab. über d. Klavierbau u. e. Übersicht über d. Klavierliteratur. Callwey Verlag, Munich 1907, 1930 (13 printings).
- Meister des Klaviers, die Pianisten der Gegenwart und der letzten Vergangenheit. Schuster & Loeffler, Berlin 1919, 1921 (14 printings).
- Brahms (Leipzig 1920, 15th edition 1933; English translation in 1929).
- Mein Leben fürs Klavier. Autobiography, Ed. Gerhard Helzel, Staccato-Verlag, Düsseldorf 2008

== Sources ==
- "Biography of Walter Niemann", Bach Cantatas Website
