= Robert Cuckson =

American composer and pianist

Robert Cuckson (born 1942, UK) is an American composer and pianist. He emigrated to Australia in 1949, studied at the NSW State Conservatorium of Music, and gained a Diploma in piano in 1960. Cuckson followed this with private studies in piano, composition and theory, in the UK and the US, his teachers including Ilona Kabos and Carlo Zecchi (piano), Georg Tintner and Peter Racine Fricker (composition), and Allen Forte (theory). In 1968 he returned to the formal study of music and worked toward a B.S. in composition at the Mannes College of Music in New York. He followed this with three degrees in composition from Yale University: M.M. (1971), M.M.A. (1974), and D.M.A. (1979). A resident of the United States since 1974, Cuckson took US citizenship in 1983.

Cuckson has held various positions at the Mannes College The New School for Music in New York City since 1971. These have included administrative positions, such as Dean of the Faculties (1979–84) and Vice-President for Academic Affairs (1984–87), and teaching positions in the Techniques of Music Faculty (of which he became co-Chair in 1994), the Composition Faculty, and the Keyboard Studies Program. Since 1991 he has also taught in the Theory of Music Faculty and the Keyboard Studies Program at the Curtis Institute in Philadelphia.

Cuckson has completed two operas, The Blind Men and Adrian and Jusemina, based on plays by Michel de Ghelderode (translated and adapted by the composer), and has written numerous other works for a variety of media: orchestral pieces, chamber works, piano solos and songs. His music has been performed by such ensembles as the Brisbane Symphony Orchestra, the Janáček String Quartet, the Czech Philharmonic Wind Quintet, and the Yale Collegium Orchestra. As a pianist, he has given solo recitals in London, Amsterdam, Oslo, Stockholm, Berlin, San Francisco, Pittsburgh and Sydney, and has appeared as soloist in concerto performances with the Sydney and Melbourne Symphony Orchestras.
