= Susanne Rode-Breymann =

German musicologist (born 1958)

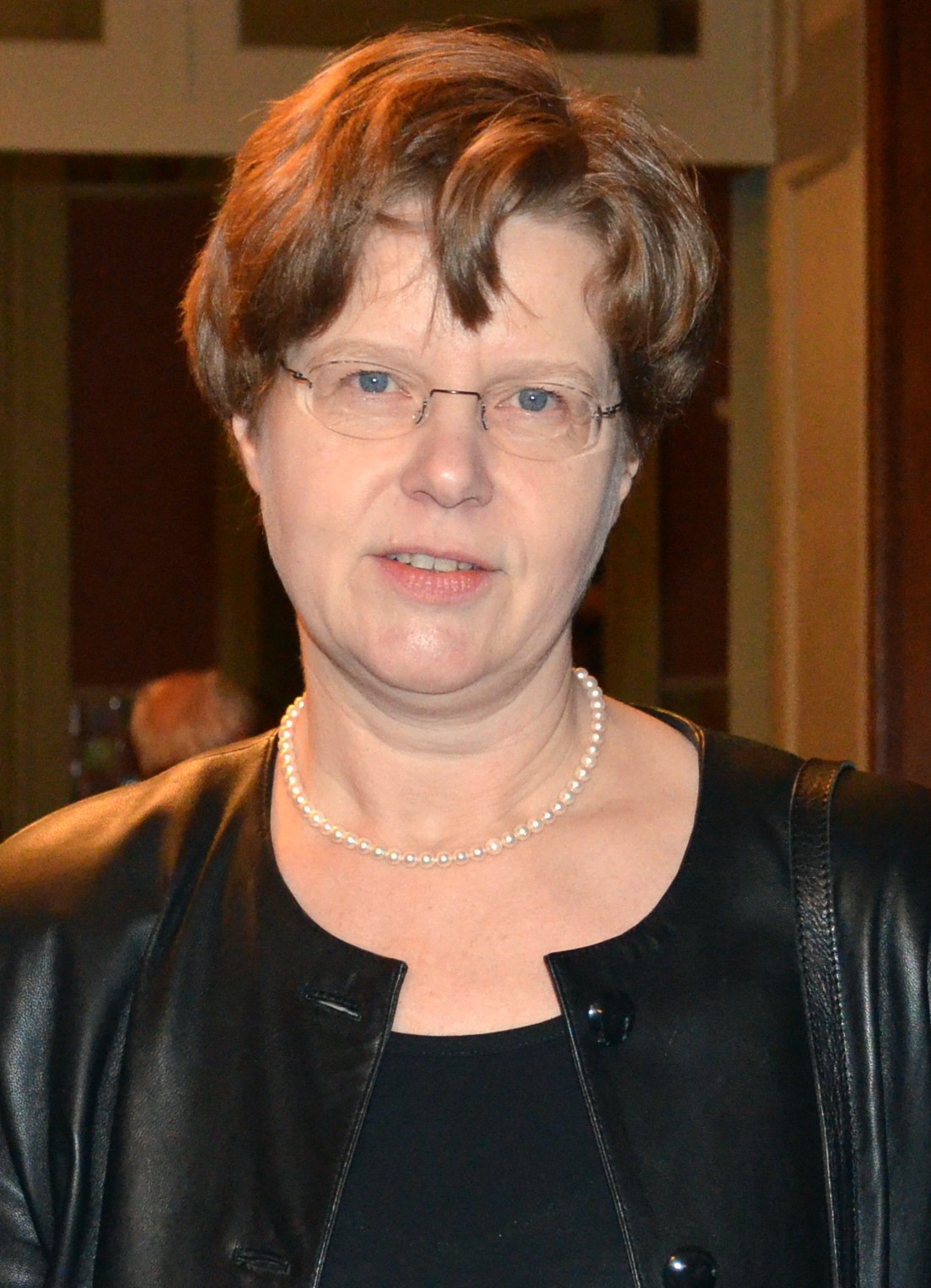
Susanne Rode-Breymann in 2014

Susanne Rode-Breymann (born 29 May 1958 in Hamburg) is a German musicologist. She was the president of the Hochschule für Musik, Theater und Medien Hannover from 2010 until March 2024.

== Biography ==
Rode-Breymann studied Early music and music education at the Hamburg Conservatory and musicology, art history and literature at the University of Hamburg. She received her doctorate in 1988 with a thesis on Alban Berg and Karl Kraus. From 1988 to 1992, Rode-Breymann was a researcher at the University of Bayreuth. As a research fellow at the Paul Sacher Foundation in Basel in 1989, she researched Anton Webern and other composers. From 1992 to 1996, Rode-Breymann was a researcher at the University of Bonn. From 1996 to 1999 she taught as a university lecturer at the Hochschule für Musik, Theater und Medien Hannover and was a professor of historical musicology at the Hochschule für Musik und Tanz Köln from 1999 to 2004.

Rode-Breymann was appointed professor of historical musicology at the Hochschule für Musik, Theater und Medien Hannover in October 2004, serving as vice president from July 2006 to July 2008. In February 2010, she was elected president of the university. She began serving as a guest professor at the Hochschule für Musik Nürnberg in 2024.

Rode-Breymann is editor and author of numerous publications in the fields of gender studies, music history, early modern, contemporary music and the music of the turn of the century.
