= Anna Deinet =

German operatic soprano

Anna Deinet (also Anna von Possart and Anna Deinet-Possart) (22 February 1843 – 18 August 1919) was a German operatic soprano who had an active career during the latter half of the 19th century. She had a lengthy career at the Bavarian State Opera where she particularly excelled in coloratura soprano roles. She is best remembered today for portraying Brangäne in the world premiere of Richard Wagner's Tristan und Isolde in 1865 and Helmwige in the premiere of Wagner's Die Walküre in 1869.

== Biography ==
Born in Frankfurt am Main, Deinet studied under Elise Seebach before making her professional opera debut at the opera house in Frankfurt as Gabriele in Conradin Kreutzer's Das Nachtlager in Granada in 1861. Later that year she became a principal artist at the Hessisches Staatstheater Wiesbaden where she had her first big successes during the 1861–1862 season. In 1862–1863 she sang at the Bremen Theater.

In 1863, Deinet was appointed to the Bavarian State Opera where she remained until her retirement from the stage fifteen years later. Her first assignments at the house were Isabella in Giacomo Meyerbeer's Robert le diable, the Queen of the Night in Wolfgang Amadeus Mozart's The Magic Flute, and Leonora in Giuseppe Verdi's Il trovatore. On 10 June 1865 she created the role of Brangäne in Wagner's Tristan und Isolde under the baton of Hans von Bülow. She also created the role of Helmwige (one of the Valkyries) in Richard Wagner's Die Walküre on 26 June 1869.

While performing in Munich, Deinet met actor Ernst von Possart (1841–1921) and began a romantic relationship with him in the mid-1860s. The couple were married in 1868, after which the soprano performed under the name Anna Deinet-Possart. Among the many roles she sang at the Bavarian State Opera were Konstanze in Mozart's Die Entführung aus dem Serail, Marie in Gaetano Donizetti's La fille du régiment, Susanna in Mozart's The Marriage of Figaro, Inez in Meyerbeer's L'Africaine, and Venus in Wagner's Tannhäuser. On 1 August 1878, she gave her final opera performance.

In 1875, Deinet's daughter Ernestine von Possart (1875–1946) was born. Her daughter was married to operatic tenor Robert Hutt and also had a highly successful career as an operatic soprano, using the stage name Ernesta Delsarta. In 1883, she divorced Von Possart, but the couple reconciled and were remarried in New York City 1888. From 1894–1905, her husband served as the director of the Bavarian State Opera. Deinet died in Munich at the age of 76.
