= Gabriel Chodos =

American pianist

Gabriel Chodos was an American pianist who had performed throughout the United States, Europe, Japan and Israel.

== Education ==
Chodos's principal teacher was Aube Tzerko, a student of Schnabel. He also studied piano with Leonard Shure at the Aspen Music Festival, Josef Dichler in Vienna, and Carlo Zecchi in Salzburg.

Mr. Chodos holds a Master's degree in Music from UCLA and a Diploma in Piano from the Akademie fur Musik and darstellende Kunst in Vienna.

He also studied theory with Leonard Stein, a former assistant of Schoenberg, and holds an undergraduate degree in philosophy from the University of California at Los Angeles, being elected to Phi Beta Kappa.

== Career ==
Chodos is a winner of the Concert Artists Guild competition in New York. Chodos also received a Fulbright Scholarship, Martha Baird Rockefeller grants, and a Solo Recitalist grant from the National Endowment for the Arts.

He has performed as soloist with the Chicago Symphony Orchestra, the Radio Philharmonic Orchestra of Holland, the Jerusalem Symphony Orchestra, and the Aspen Chamber Symphony. Mr. Chodos performed at the 92nd Street Y, Alice Tully Hall, Merkin Hall, Symphony Hall, and the Library of Congress.

In recent years, Chodos’s performances of works by Schubert, Brahms, and Chopin have been broadcast nationwide on National Public Radio.

== Teaching ==
Chodos is a member of the artist faculty of the New England Conservatory in Boston. Chodos was an artist-faculty member of the Aspen Music Festival for many years.

He has given master classes throughout the world, including the Guildhall School of Music in London, the Hochschule für Musik in Leipzig, the Estonia Music Academy in Tallinn, the Toho Gakuen School of Music and the Kunitachi School of Music in Tokyo.

He is also a frequent guest artist and teacher at the Chautauqua Music Festival and the Rutgers Summerfest.
