= Nancy Green (cellist) =

American classical cellist (born 1952)

- Born: May 25, 1952 (age 74); Boston, Massachusetts, U.S.
- Education: Juilliard School; Robert Schumann Hochschule
- Occupation: Cellist
- Years active: 1976–present
- Employers: Guildhall School of Music and Drama; Chethams School of Music; University of Arizona
- Style: Classical music
- Website: www.nancygreencello.com

Nancy Green (born May 25, 1952) is an American cellist.

== Early life ==
Green was born in Boston in 1952 and began playing the cello at age eight. She studied at the Juilliard School with Leonard Rose and Lynn Harrell and performed in the masterclasses of Mstislav Rostropovich. After receiving a Rockefeller grant to study in London with Jacqueline du Pré, she continued her studies at the Robert Schumann Hochschule in Düsseldorf, Germany, with Johannes Goritzki. In 1976, her debut at Carnegie Hall, sponsored by the Concert Artists Guild, was described as one by a "fine young musician" by The New York Times. In 1978, Green performed a cello solo with the Chappaqua Chamber Orchestra.

== Career ==
Green has taught at the Guildhall School of Music and the Chethams School of Music. In 1995, she joined the faculty at the University of Arizona, where she was head of cello studies. In 2005, she left academia to focus on performing and recording music.

Green was the first cellist to record the complete Brahms Hungarian Dances arranged by Carlo Alfredo Piatti, Franz Schmidt's Three Fantasy Pieces (after Hungarian National Melodies), and the complete works of Mario Castelnuovo-Tedesco, all on Biddulph Recordings (London) and later re-issued on JRI Recordings (USA). Other premieres include Donald Tovey's Sonata for Cello Solo (JRI), the complete works for cello and piano of Robert Fuchs, the complete Arensky works for cello, and works of the Venezuelan composer Paul Desenne (Cello Classics), as well as Mendelssohn–Merk Variations in A major, newly completed by R. Larry Todd and published by Bärenreiter.

With her longstanding duo partner, Frederick Moyer (also her cousin), Green recorded numerous CDs, which were described as "musically thoughtful". She also performed regularly as a duo with the Brazilian pianist Diana Kacso.

The minor planet 11067, discovered in 1992, is named "Greenancy" in honor of Green.

== Selected works ==
- Nancy Green & R. Larry Todd, "Felix Mendelssohn: The Complete Works for Cello & Piano (Includes Bonus CD) - JRI Recordings", www.jrirecordings.com
- Nancy Green & Tannis Gibson, Song of the Birds: Spanish & Latin Cello
- Nancy Green, Desenne: Jaguar Songs (21st-Century Cello)
- Nancy Green & Frederick Moyer, Brahms/Piatti
- Nancy Green, "Tovey and Kodaly: Two sonatas for solo cello - JRI Recordings", www.jrirecordings.com
- Nancy Green & Frederick Moyer, J143 - Beethoven: Complete Works for Cello and Piano with Frederick Moyer
- Nancy Green & Frederick Moyer, J132 - Castelnuovo-Tedesco: Complete Works for Cello and Piano, with Frederick Moyer
- Nancy Green with Bucharest Chamber Soloists, conductor Eric Shumsky, J129 - Haydn Cello Concertos
- Nancy Green & Tannis Gibson, J123 - Sonatas by Dohnanyi/Kodaly/Strauss, with Tannis Gibson
- Nancy Green & Frederick Moyer, J120 - Cello Works of Arensky and Rachmaninoff
- Nancy Green & Babette Hierholzer, J119 - Ries: Complete Works for Cello and Piano
- Nancy Green & Frederick Moyer, J111 - Johannes Brahms - Two Sonatas for Piano and Cello
- Nancy Green & Frederick Moyer, J102 -Green/Moyer Cello Recital, (Schumann, Mendelssohn, Debussy, Britten)
- Nancy Green & Babette Hierholzer, J147 - Robert Volkmann Works for Cello and Piano
- Nancy Green & Caroline Palmer (November 8, 1992), LAW005 - Robert Fuchs: Complete Works for Cello and Piano, with Caroline Palmer
- Nancy Green & Franz-Josef Birk, A1 - Beethoven, Chopin, Bruch, de Falla, Bach/Moscheles, with Franz-Josef Birk
