= Ernst von Possart =

German actor and director (1841–1921)

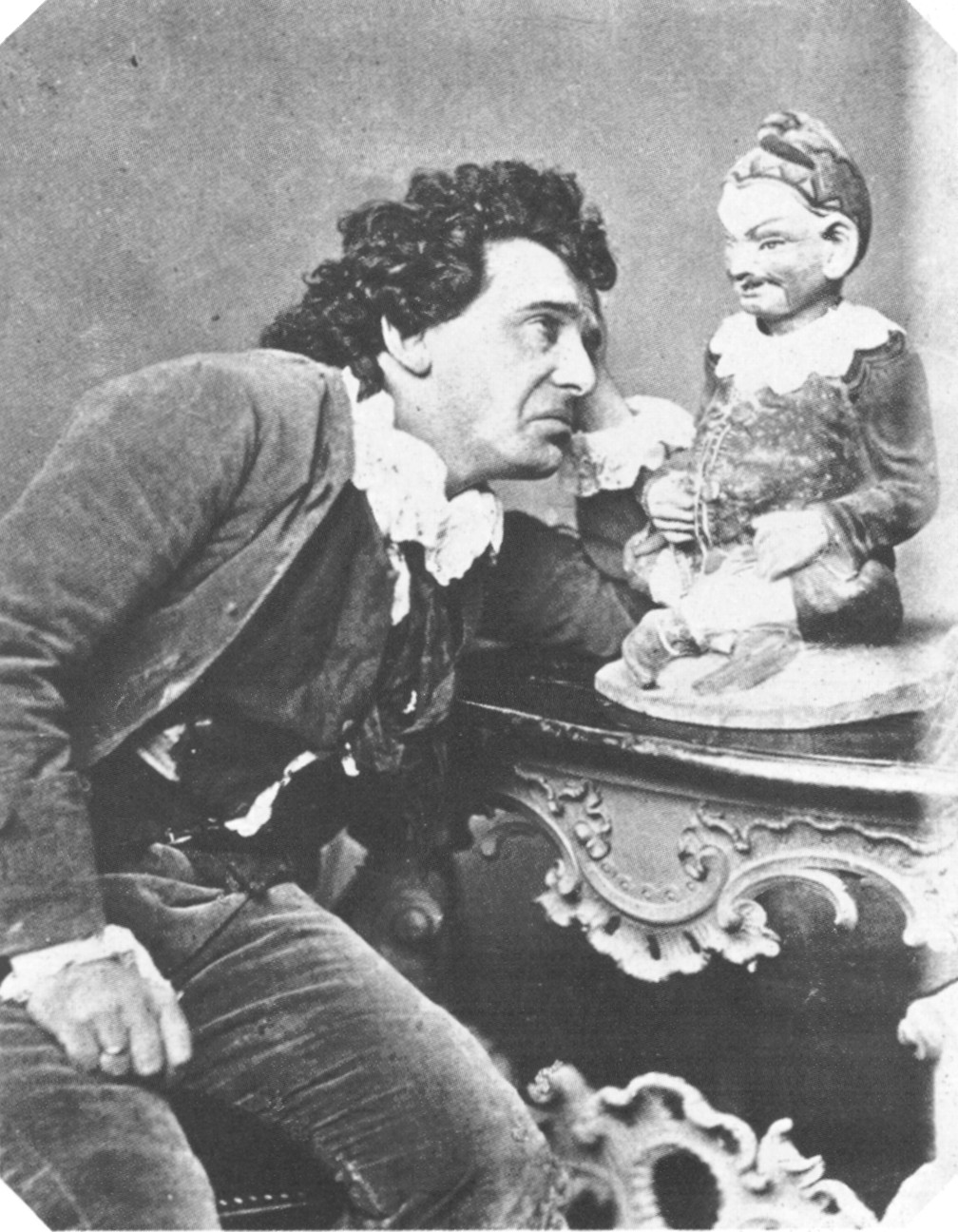
Ernst von Possart

Ernst von Possart (11 May 1841 – 7 April 1921) was a German actor and theatre director.

Possart was born in Berlin and was early an actor in Breslau, Bern, and Hamburg. Connected with the Munich Court Theatre after 1864, he became the leading director in 1875. In 1877 he was made director of the Bavarian royal theatres. From 1887 to 1892 he toured the United States, Germany, Russia, and the Netherlands. From 1895 until 1905 he was general director of the Bayerische Hoftheater, and in 1901 he opened the Prinzregententheater (Prince Regent's Theatre).

In 1897, in return for Possart assisting him in gaining an orchestral post in Munich, Richard Strauss wrote a recitation for narrator and piano. They performed Enoch Arden in a number of cities. On 15 February 1878, Henrik Ibsen wrote him a personal letter commending him on his "genius" performance as "Konsul Bernick" in Ibsens play The Pillars of Society which had its opening date at the Residence Theatre, Munich, 10 days earlier.

In the Residenz Theatre he produced several of Mozart's operas. Among his own roles were Nathan, Gessler, Mephisto, Iago, and Shylock. He edited German versions of King Lear (1875), The Merchant of Venice (1880), and Coriolanus; wrote the plays Der Deutschfranzösische Krieg (1871), Recht des Herzens (1898), and Im Aussichtswagen (1898); and published Aufgabe der Schauspielkunst (1895), Lehrgang des Schauspielers (1901), and descriptions of many of his own productions.

In 1868 Possart married opera singer Anna Deinet. In 1875 their daughter Ernestine (1875–1946) was born. Ernestine was married to operatic tenor Robert Hutt and also had a highly successful career as an operatic soprano, using the stage name Ernesta Delsarta. In 1883, Possart and Deinet divorced, but the couple reconciled and were remarried in New York City in 1888. Possart died in Berlin, Germany, at age 79.
