= Enoch Arden (Strauss) =

1897 melodrama by Richard Strauss

- Melodrama by Richard Strauss
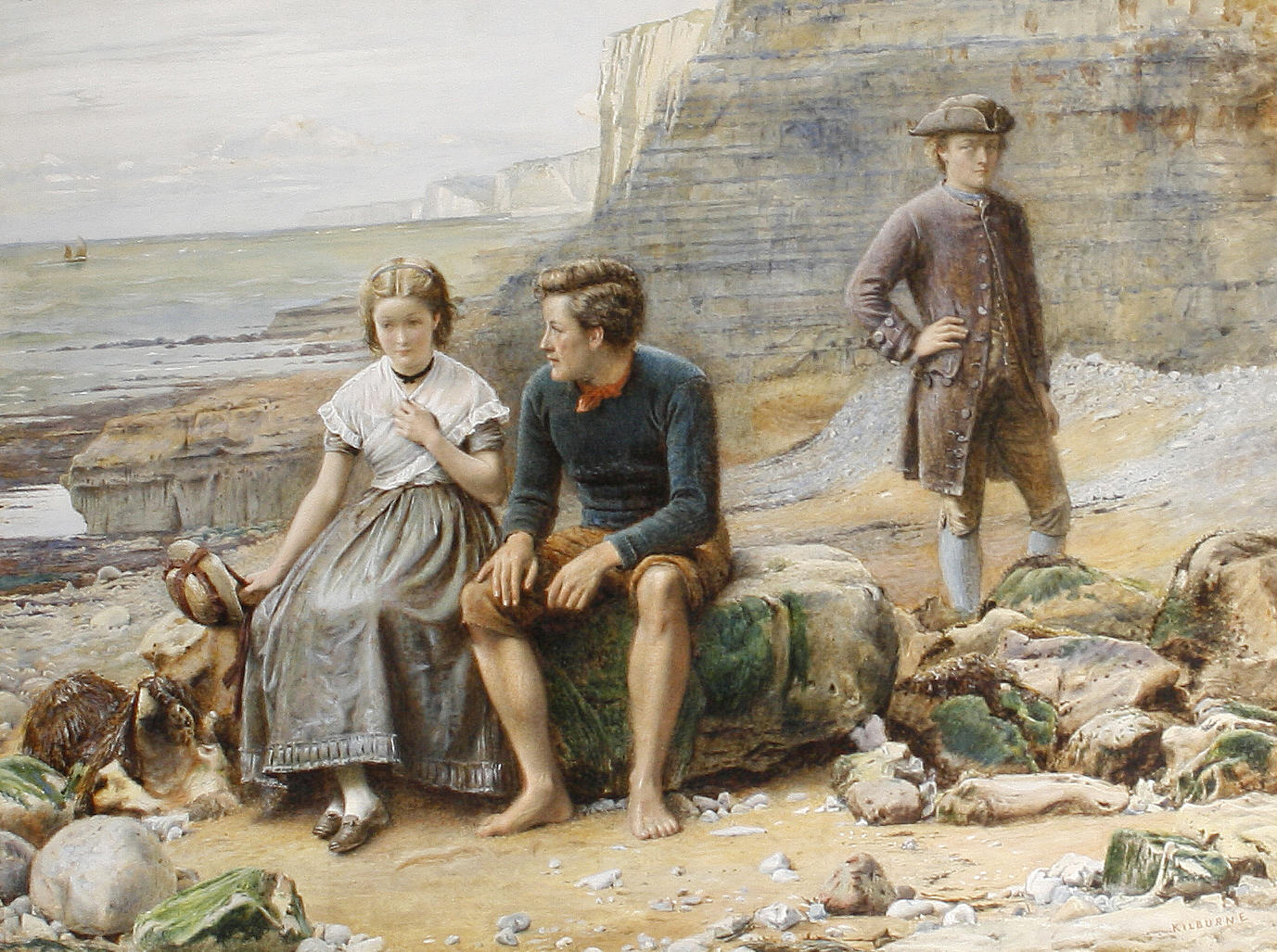
- "Enoch Arden" (watercolour painting by George Goodwin Kilburne
- Catalogue: TrV 181
- Opus: 38
- Text: Adolf Strodtmann (1829–1879), after Alfred Tennyson's Enoch Arden
- Language: German
- Composed: February 1897
- Dedication: Ernst von Possart
- Scoring: Spoken voice and piano

Enoch Arden, Op. 38, TrV. 181, is a melodrama for narrator and piano, written in 1897 by Richard Strauss setting a German translation of the 1864 poem of the same name by Alfred, Lord Tennyson.

== History ==
Richard Strauss wrote Enoch Arden for the actor Ernst von Possart, who in 1896 had assisted him in obtaining the post of Chief Conductor at the Bavarian State Opera, at that time still known as the Bavarian Court Opera. He wrote it while engaged in composing Don Quixote and finished it in February 1897. Strauss and Possart toured together widely with the melodrama, in a German translation by Adolf Strodtmann.

It was well received by audiences and Strauss's reputation was enhanced more by it than by his symphonic poems. The following year Strauss capitalised on its success by writing Das Schloss am Meere (The Castle by the Sea) to words by Ludwig Uhland.

The work has been described as falling within the genre of incidental music. It consists mainly of brief interludes indicative of changes of time and setting, as well as moments of punctuation and commentary. Each of the two parts is introduced by a prelude and concludes with a postlude. Strauss uses leitmotifs to identify each of the characters: Enoch Arden (a chordal sequence in E♭), Annie Lee (a rising figure in G), Philip Ray (a melody in E), the sea (G minor). He does not develop these into melodies as such, but uses them statically. There are long passages where the piano is silent.

Because of the sparse nature of the music, performances of Enoch Arden are largely dependent on the speaker rather than the pianist. Criticisms of the piece as a musical work per se do not do it justice, as it was never intended to be primarily a piece of music but a dramatic presentation with musical accompaniment.

Enoch Arden was popular in its day, but slipped into obscurity when fashions changed and recitations, declamations and melodramas came to be considered passé. In recent years the work has attracted some notable names in both the speaker's role, including Dietrich Fischer-Dieskau, Jon Vickers, Michael York, Claude Rains, Benjamin Luxon, Patrick Stewart and Gwyneth Jones, and the pianist's role, including Glenn Gould, Jörg Demus, Stephen Hough, Emanuel Ax, and Marc-André Hamelin.

== Performances ==
The English opera singer Richard Temple performed the work various times in the early 20th century, including at Steinway Hall in New York.

Dietrich Fischer-Dieskau presented the work in German a number of times from 1993. He also recorded the work twice, in the mid-1960s and again in 2003.

Michael York has performed the work in English a number of times in Europe and the United States, with different pianists.

Conductor Emil de Cou arranged a version for chamber orchestra and narrator. This was performed with the Virginia Chamber Orchestra and actor Gary Sloan in 2010.

The British actor Andrew Sachs (best known for his role as Manuel in Fawlty Towers) and the Australian pianist Victor Sangiorgio have toured with a two-man show called "Life after Fawlty", which included Strauss's Enoch Arden.

== Recordings ==
Enoch Arden was probably first recorded by Erik Rhodes and Gordon Manley sometime in the 1950s. Later Claude Rains and Glenn Gould made the first successful recording in 1962. This was nominated for the 1963 Grammy Awards in the category of Best Documentary or Spoken Word Recording (Other than Comedy).

Later recordings include:

- Dietrich Fischer-Dieskau and Jörg Demus (1964)
- Hans-Reinhard Müller and Carl Seemann (1978)
- Gert Westphal and John Buttrick (1984)
- Elisabet Woska and Begonia Uriarte (1986; live recording; the first recording with a female narrator)
- Bohumil Svarc and Jiri Pokorný (1987; first recording in Czech)
- Lucy Rowan and Stephen Hough (1987)
- Mac Morgan and William Ransom (1989)
- René Schirrer and Christian Ivaldi (1991)
- Ulrich Wildgruber and Peter Stamm (1994)
- Nick Garrett and Peter Hewitt (1996)
- Jon Vickers and Marc-André Hamelin (1998; Vickers’ debut recording as a speaker)
- Paul Schmidt and Yvar Mikhashoff (1999)
- Michael York and John Bell Young (2002)
- Benjamin Luxon and Frederick Moyer (2002)
- Dietrich Fischer-Dieskau and Burkhard Kehring (2003)
- Michael Ducarel and Martin Cousin (2003)
- Laura Marinoni and Pietro De Luigi (2004; the first recording in Italian).
- David Ripley and Chad R. Bowles (2006)
- Sir Patrick Stewart and Emanuel Ax (2007)
- Brigitte Fassbaender and Wolfram Rieger (2013)
- John Bell and Simon Tedeschi (2017)
