= Henri Gobbi =

Hungarian composer

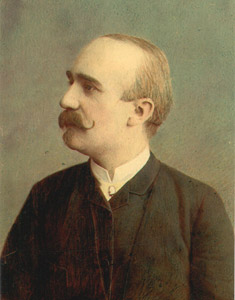
- Gobbi, in an undated potrait
- Born: 7 June 1841; Józsefváros, Pest, Hungary
- Died: 22 March 1920 (aged 78); Budapest, Hungary
- Occupations: composer; piano professor
- Years active: 1860–1920
- Style: Classical
- Children: 2

Henri Gobbi (Hungarian: Gobbi Henrik or Henrik Aloiz Adalbert Gobby; Italian: Enrico Gobbi-Ruggieri or Henri Gobbi-Ruggieri) was a 19th-century Hungarian classical composer and piano professor. He was also a student and close friend of Franz Liszt. Many of Gobbi's most important works still remain unpublished to date.

Gobbi had two children with Elisabeth Grimshaw. His daughter, Gisela, later became the second wife of Dr. Julius Adrian Pollacsek, while Franz Liszt took the sponsorship for his son, Franz Xaver.

== Life and career ==
Gobbi was born on 7 June 1841, in Józsefváros, Pest, the son of Alois and Mary (née Roth, or Rott) Gobbi-Ruggieri (Hungarian: Gobbi Alajos; Italian: Luigi Gobbi-Ruggieri). His father was also a very talented musician and violin professor in Budapest who had come from an aristocratic Italian-Paduan family. After his father's marriage to a Viennese woman Mária Rott (Roth), he settled in Hungary. His eldest son, Henri Gobbi showed in childhood an extraordinary musical talent, playing violin at the age of seven and later the piano.

At the age of 18, he had already become part of the then well-known trio Grünwald-Müller-Gobbi, where he played the piano part. He graduated from the Royal Conservatory, having studied with musicians János Nepomuk Dunkl and music theory and harmony classes with Károly Thern. But his financial problems did not disappear in the 1860s, so he still had to give private piano lessons at the beginning of his career in Budapest.

Liszt was at first careful as for Gobbi's compositions. Gobbi had sent him his first sonata in Hungarian style, Opus 13, which was dedicated to him, for Liszt's appreciation who expressed in his letter of reply an unusual interest and desire to meet the young artist himself. (Note: "Dear Sir, Your exaggerated modesty which prevented you from meeting me during my stay in Pest displeases me. Discussing face to face and in more details my genuine praise regarding your compositions would have been more agreeable. Your works point at an indisputable talent, and to a cultured and sober understanding of music. If the occasion arises, I will gladly and thoroughly speak with you of everything connected to the subject. Meanwhile, please accept my warmest thanks for your attached letter, and also for your interesting and praiseworthy compositions. Your friendly admirer, Franz Liszt") When Liszt recognized Gobbi's talent at their first meeting in Budapest, he gave his young pupil all of his attention. His works were acknowledged by other composers such as Johannes Brahms, Karl Tausig, Anton Rubinstein and Hans von Bülow, whom Gobbi was in friendly relations with when he travelled to Vienna in the mid-1860s. Brahms made use of the revised version of his Piano Trio in B major, Opus 8. The other works were transcriptions that Gobbi did from Brahms and Liszt. The latter took Gobbi's sonata and several other compositions in his own concert program and let his students play them.

On his return to Budapest, he continued teaching and composing. At this point, he wrote other musical works – a trio, a string quartet and various piano pieces. He showed the trio to Robert Volkmann, who then began teaching him composition. In 1866, Thern Károly resigned from his position as teacher at the National Academy of Music, opening vacancies for piano teacher candidates, but Henri's application was refused on the rounds of his young age.

Gobbi and Liszt's relationship began in 1867 when publisher László Kugler proposed to send to a few compositions to Liszt in Rome. Due to the extremely cordial relations with Franz Liszt, Gobbi became staff secretary and teacher when the Hungarian National Music Academy was built. His founder and president Franz Liszt, gave him the professorship of the piano department. He remained faithful to this institution for almost ten years as a leading exponent of contemporary music in Hungary. This decade was probably one of the most interesting periods in the history of this institution, as Franz Liszt's frequent presence in Budapest welcome enthusiastic music students from many countries. They rallied around the great composer and his rod professor. Henri Gobbi, who probably had the greatest respect among his disciples, among them the violin player and composer Edwin Bachmann, was known as a dutiful, strict but fair professor who enthusiastically supported and encouraged new talent and ideas. When Brahms was still terra incognito in Hungary, several of his works were presented by Gobbi, thus making the public aware of his name. He helped the Bach-culture to bloom in Hungary and breathed life into several pieces by Beethoven.

Liszt took Gobbi to his inner circles with little interruption for nearly 17 years, partly in Budapest, Rome and Weimar. Art enthusiasts wanted to know how Franz Liszt would interpret his works. That was also in the time when Gobbi had the opportunity to live in New York City as professor, but he preferred to devote himself to his personal goal of an independent Hungarian musical culture.

He died on 22 March 1920, in Budapest.

== Selected works ==
=== Works for piano ===
- Fantasy Pictures, Op. 17
  - Alone
  - Begging child
  - Intermezzo
  - Near the monastery
  - Outdoors
  - Returning Home
- Six-tone Images
1. On the terrace
2. In the cemetery
3. The ruins of Csővár
4. With the big oak
5. In the chestnut forest
6. By the forest Bronnen
- Six small character pieces, Op. 19
1. On the promenade
2. Small soldier
3. Night little piece
4. With the fishing
5. In the woods
6. From old times
- An album sheet, Op. 27
  - Waltz No. 1, Op. 8
  - Waltz No. 2, Op. 8
  - Waltz No. 3, Op. 9
  - Waltz No. 4, Op. 11
  - Waltz No. 5, Op. 12
  - Waltz No. 6, Op. 22
  - Waltz No. 7, Op. 10
  - Waltz No. 8, Op. 22
- Nocturne, Op. 5
- Which is my star, Op. 5
- Impromtu, Op. 5
- Kronázási induló-Ábránd, Op. 20
- Concert Studies No. 3, Op. 25
- Prelude and Toccatina, Op. 28
- First Grand Sonata, Op. 13

=== Four-handed piano works ===
- Hungarian Suite No. 1
- Hungarian Suite No. 2
- Hungarian Suite No. 3
- Suite No. 4 Hungarian
- Hungarian Serenade
- Hungarian Sketches, Op 23
- Hungarian melodies
- Gyászra ébredés (sad awakening)

=== Works for violin and piano ===
- Serenade No. 1 in F♯ minor, Op. 6
- Serenade No. 2 in F major, Op. 6
- Serenade No. 3 in D minor, Op. 6
- Serenade No. 4 in F♯ minor, Op. 6
- Serenade No. 5 in E♭ major, Op. 6
- Serenade No. 6 in D major, Op. 6
- My Friend A. Sipos, Op. 16, No. 1
- Miss Mary Stevens, Op. 16, No. 2
- My Friend F. Plotényi, Op. 16, No. 3
- My brother Alois, Op. 16, No. 4

== See also ==
- Classical music
- Romantic music

== Literature ==
- Legánÿ Dezső, Franz Liszt in Hungary, 1869-1873, (LMo) - (Budapest Music Publisher) 1976.
- Kálmán Isoz; The Hungarian National Museum Library (Directory. VI. music manuscripts, I volume, Musical Letters) 1924
