= Ilona Kabos =

Hungarian-British pianist (1893–1973)

- Born: Ilona Rosenberg; 7 December 1893; Budapest, Hungary
- Died: 27 May 1973 (aged 79); London, England
- Citizenship: Hungarian, British
- Education: Franz Liszt Academy of Music
- Occupations: Pianist, piano teacher
- Years active: c.1915–1973
- Employer(s): Royal Budapest Academy of Music; Juilliard School
- Known for: Premiering works by Béla Bartók, Zoltán Kodály, Luigi Dallapiccola, Roy Harris, Carlos Chávez, and Mátyás Seiber; influential piano pedagogue
- Spouse: Louis Kentner (m. 1931; div. 1945)
- Awards: Liszt Prize (1915)

Ilona Kabos (7 December 1893 – 27 May 1973) was a Hungarian-British pianist and teacher.

== Biography ==
Kabos was born Ilona Rosenberg to a Jewish family in Budapest in 1893 (some sources give her year of birth as 1894, 1898 or 1902). She studied at the Franz Liszt Academy of Music under Árpád Szendy (a pupil of Franz Liszt), Leo Weiner and Zoltán Kodály), and in 1915 she won the Liszt Prize. In the early part of her career, she played for Ferruccio Busoni, who also played for her. She toured widely, giving a number of premiere performances of works by composers including Kodály, Weiner, Béla Bartók, Luigi Dallapiccola, Roy Harris, Carlos Chávez and Mátyás Seiber. She made her American debut in 1951. She taught at the Royal Budapest Academy of Music from 1930 through 1936.

Kabos was married to fellow Hungarian pianist Louis Kentner, and they made their home in London. In November 1942, Kabos and Kentner gave the world premiere of Bartók's Concerto for Two Pianos, Percussion and Orchestra in London. She premiered Robert Crawford's Six Bagatelles, Op. 3 (1948).

Kabos' marriage ended in 1945, when Kentner left her for Griselda Gould (daughter of British pianist Evelyn Suart and sister of the ballerina Diana Gould, who was Yehudi Menuhin's second wife).

Kabos is best known as a teacher of other pianists. She gave master classes, and taught both privately and at institutions such as Dartington Summer School and the Juilliard School (from 1965, at the express invitation of Peter Mennin; Kabos and Rosina Lhévinne often exchanged students).

Kabos' better-known students include: Susan Alexander-Max, David Bollard, Robert Cuckson, Monte Hill Davis, Norma Fisher, Peter Frankl, Joan Havill, Niel Immelman, William Corbett Jones, Joseph Kalichstein, David Oei, John Ogdon, Denver Oldham, Kun-Woo Paik, Alberto Portugheis, Staffan Scheja, Roberto Szidon and Alan Weiss. Other students included: Paul Burke, Nigel Coxe, David-Michael Dunbar, Marilyn Engle, Meira Farkas, Jonathan Miles Freeman, Otto Freudenthal, Nancy Burton Garrett, Derek Han, Robin Harrison, Emanuel Krasovsky, Risto Lauriala, Dana Muller, Thalia Myers, Rafael Minaskanian, Joel Sachs, Jeffrey Siegel, Sérgio Varella-Cid, Patrick J. Mullins, and Veda Zuponcic.

Kabos' teaching method included scribbling on the music during her lessons. She was given to writing "bold directions in red crayon, right across the page, in huge letters, gratuitous slashes". The crayon was actually a china marker, wrapped in paper. She was also the musical advisor for a number of films: Murder in the Cathedral (1951), The Fake (1953), The Diamond (1954), Jet Storm (1959), and The Hands of Orlac (1960).

A hostel for Kabos' students was established in Finchley, North London, by Charles Napper.

She died in London in 1973, aged 79.

== Tributes ==
The Inventions, Op. 2, are a set of piano pieces by André Tchaikowsky; each invention is a musical portrait of a friend or colleague of Tchaikowsky's, and No. 3 was subtitled "To Ilona Kabos".

In 1968 Serge Tcherepnin wrote a piano piece for Kabos, called simply "For Ilona Kabos".

== Recordings ==
Kabos made very few recordings. They include:

- a record of a 1952 New York Town Hall concert, with works by:
  - Liszt (Variations on 'Weinen, Klagen, Sorgen, Zagen', S. 180; and excerpts from Weihnachtsbaum, S. 186), and
  - Bartók (Three Rondos, Sz84; Sonatina, Sz55; For Children, Sz42)
    - Edward Tatnall Canby, writing in the Saturday Review, said this was "the best piano record I have heard, bar none".
- Liszt's Gnomenreigen (live, Budapest, 1956)
- Sir Michael Tippett's Piano Concerto (BBC; undated)
- J.S. Bach: Concerto in C major for Two Claviers, BWV 1061 (with Gina Bachauer).
