= Susan Alexander-Max =

American-born British fortepianist

Susan Alexander-Max (died 26 January 2016) was an American-born British fortepianist best known for her period performances of baroque and classical music.

A graduate of the Juilliard School of Music, she later studied with Ilona Kabos in London. She was a member of the period-instrument chamber group The Music Collection, with Simon Standage (violin) and Jennifer Ward Clarke (cello). She was also a professor of piano at the Guildhall School of Music & Drama.

== Biography ==
Alexander-Max was born in New York City and recognised internationally as a leading fortepianist and clavichordist specialising in the music of the late 18th and early 19th centuries. Having graduated from the Juilliard School of Music, she won a scholarship to study with Ilona Kabos in London.

She was a finalist in the International Bach Competition and performed, recorded and taught extensively throughout the United States, the United Kingdom, the Far East and Europe. A featured performer on international radio and television, she has played, as soloist and chamber musician, in festivals, museums and galleries, universities and music colleges world-wide.

Alexander-Max performed at the Cheltenham International Festival of Music, Queen's Festival of Early Music, Belfast, the English Haydn Festival, the Haydn Festival, Eisenstadt, Austria, the Vleeshuis Museum, Antwerp and the Prague Spring International Festival of Music. She was a frequent guest artist at the Metropolitan Museum of Art, New York City.

A professor at the Guildhall School of Music and Drama in London until 1996, she directed the chamber ensemble, The Music Collection, and the educational project, Music in Schools. As a specialist in early keyboards, she gave masterclasses and lecture recitals internationally. She taught at universities in England, Ireland, the United States, and China, as well as the masterclass series at the Juilliard School of Music, New York City, the Conservatoire National Supérieur de Musique et Danse, Paris, and the Hong Kong Academy of Performing Arts.

As a recording artist, she performed the Chamber Music of Hummel, the Early Piano Sonatas of Clementi and the complete keyboard works of Domenico Zipoli, volume 2. This latter CD was recorded in conjunction with the Metropolitan Museum of Art, NYC, on their Cristofori fortepiano of 1720. The second in the series of Chamber Music by Hummel was awarded BBC's recommendation of the month. Her latest CD of Clementi Piano Sonatas was released, as well as the Concertos of Johann Christian Bach.

Susan Alexander-Max died on 26 January 2016.

== See also ==
- Juilliard School of Music
