= Michael Renkel =

German concert guitarist

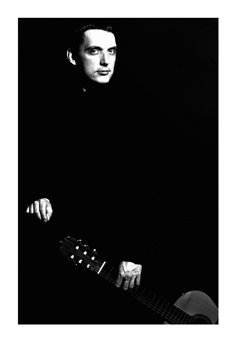
Michael Renkel

Michael Renkel is a German concert guitarist who extends his instrument via live electronics and computer.

== Life and works ==
Michael Renkel was born in Celle / north Germany. He studied classical guitar in Hamburg. The main emphasis of his work is an interest in open methods of composition and he developed his style since the mid-eighties using preparations and advanced playing techniques. He is engaged in aleatoric composition, variable forms and structures as well as notation. Influences include John Cage, Morton Feldman, Hans Werner Henze, Helmut Lachenmann, Violeta Dinescu, Derek Bailey, Keith Rowe and old lute music. He was the first musician to transform the concert guitar by means of computer patches and live processing.

His guitar playing straddles tradition and the development of a personal language that includes extended playing techniques, the preparation of the acoustic guitar and quasi-theatrical performance. In a logical continuation he also extends the instrument via computer technology and live electronics. The acoustic guitar is modified in a way that blurs the delineation between acoustic preparation and electronic variance. In his works the instrumental material is altered in realtime using preparations, laptops, MAX/MSP, percussion instruments, a 16 channel sampler-sequencer, synthesizers and a vibraphone. Renkel also works with field recordings and composes works that experiment with genetic processes that expand the musical parameters to include concepts such as generation, mutation, hybridization and coding („Genetic Annotation“). He also writes video animated compositions in which the performers interpret a permanently changing score in a live situation („Nomos Alto“). His Compositions are published at Verlag Neue Musik / Berlin. He is intensively involved with jazz guitar and its implementation in his own concepts and projects. He also works as video artist and designs sound installations. Since 2015 he has been increasingly involved with sampler and sequencer technology, synthesizers, as well as the inclusion of more rhythmic structures and "beats" in his music. International concert activity and cooperations among others with: Phil Minton, Sven-Åke Johansson, Burkhard Beins, Axel Dörner, Ignaz Schick, Robin Hayward, Andrea Neumann, Neumann, Magda Mayas, Sabine Vogel, Tobias Vethake.

Renkel lives and works in Berlin / Neukölln since 1996.

== Discography ==
- 2010, MEK online release on homophoni
- 2010, Activity Center, Lohn & Brot, absinthrecords
- 2009, Phosphor II, potlatch, P109
- 2009, rebecca variation no 12, esquilo records, duo with Kai Fagaschinski
- 2009, in-formation neukoelln, homophoni 034, duo with cheapmachines aka Phil Julian
- 2008, Kalte Welle 102, Kning Disc, Duo mit Sven Åke Johansson
- 2007, phono_phono, absinthRecords 014, Trio mit M. Mayas, S. Vogel
- 2005, Ensemble Phosphor, Neue Musik in Deutschland 1950 - 2000, Deutscher Musikrat + Sony BMG
- 2005, Errorkoerper III, absinthRecords 009
- 2003, Activity Center & Phil Minton, absinthRecords 006
- 2003, Berlin Strings, absinthRecords 002 / compilation
- 2002, Sitill, L'Innomable, Duo mit Luca Venitucci
- 2002, Rabecca, Charhizma 022, Kai Fagaschinski / Michael Renkel
- 2001, Phosphor, Potlatch P501
- 1999, möwen & moos, 2:13 Music 008/009, Activity Center, Duo mit Burkhard Beins
- 1996, Nunc, 2:13 Music 02
