= Denver Oldham =

American concert pianist (1936–2012)

Denver Oldham (September 15, 1936 – May 6, 2012) was an American concert pianist and recording artist. A Steinway Artist, he had to his credit twelve European concert tours, two South American concert tours, as well as numerous domestic performances. He recorded ten albums, paying special attention to the works of neglected American composers. He was born in Long Island, New York, to Scottish immigrants.

== Early life ==
Denver Oldham first began formal piano lessons at the age of five with Edna Dalton after his kindergarten teacher discovered him improvising on nursery rhymes. By the age of twelve he was performing with symphonies in the Long Island area regularly, and he soon held his first public solo recital at the behest of the Music Education League.

== Career ==
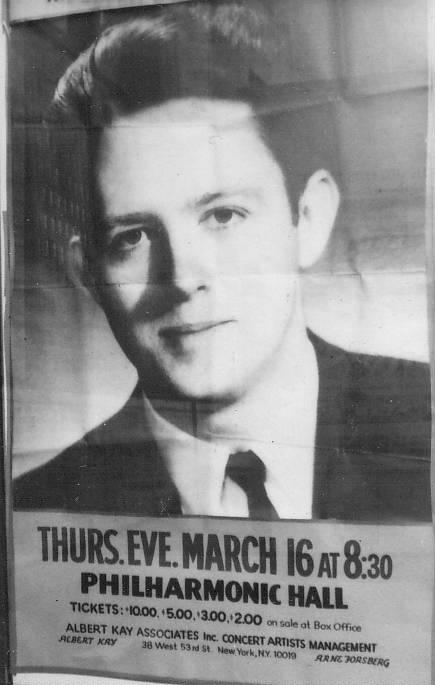
Promotional poster for Denver Oldham at Philharmonic Hall

Oldham graduated from the Juilliard School of Music, where he studied under Joseph Bloch and Leland Thompson. He subsequently studied in London with Dame Myra Hess and Ilona Kabos and at the Aspen Music Festival with Alexander Uninsky. At the age of 24, Oldham went on his first European concert tour, which spanned Copenhagen, Zurich, Oslo, The Hague, and Vienna. In 1961, he made his New York City debut at The Town Hall. He later performed at both Philharmonic Hall (later renamed Avery Fisher Hall) in the Lincoln Center for the Performing Arts and at Carnegie Hall. Continuing European tours have taken him to Basel, Amsterdam, Berlin, Brussels, Dublin, and London.

Beginning in 1982, Denver Oldham built up a library of recordings highlighting the works of varied, often underrepresented or minority American composers. The list included composers such as Charles Tomlinson Griffes, John Alden Carpenter, R. Nathaniel Dett, William Grant Still, John Knowles Paine, and Angelo Musolino. He also recorded the works of European composers Jacques Ibert, Enrique Granados, and Franz Liszt. Oldham's first album, Charles Tomlinson Griffes: Collected Works for Piano, sold more than 80,000 copies, and his recordings were featured on the National Public Radio show Performance Today.

== Honors ==
The National Guild of Piano Teachers awarded Denver Oldham the Paderewski Gold Medal, and the Music Education League awarded him a Gold Medal on two separate occasions. His albums Charles Tomlinson Griffes: Collected Works for Piano and John Alden Carpenter: Collected Piano Works were each nominated for a Grammy Award. Time magazine named John Alden Carpenter: Collected Piano Works as one of the top ten best classical recordings of 1986. Equinox Piano Concerto from the 2006 album Angelo Musolino: Orchestral Works was nominated for the Pulitzer Prize in music.

== Later life ==
Denver Oldham later moved to Augusta, Georgia, where he offered piano lessons. Although his lessons were very pricey, he had a select number of students which he catered to greatly.

Oldham died on May 6, 2012, at the age of 75.

== Discography ==
- Charles Tomlinson Griffes: Collected Works for Piano (1982) New World Records
- John Alden Carpenter: Collected Piano Works (1986) New World Records
- R. Nathaniel Dett: Piano Works (1992) New World Records
- John Knowles Paine: Selected Piano Works (1995) New World Records
- William Grant Still, R. Nathaniel Dett: Piano Music (1996) Altarus Records
- Jacques Ibert: Piano Works (2003) Altarus Records
- Angelo Musolino: Orchestral Works (2006) Albany Records
