= Frederick Moyer =

American concert pianist

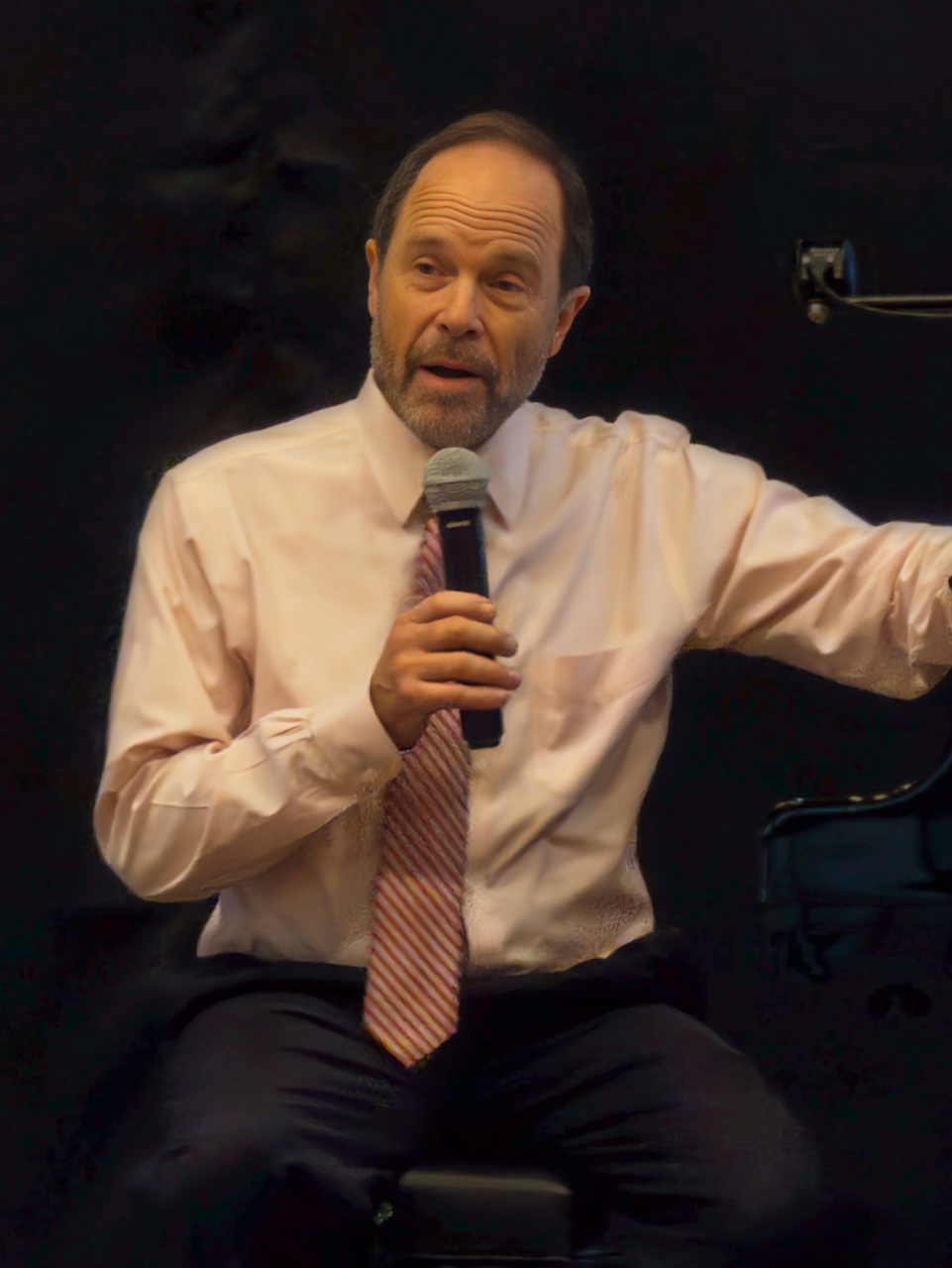

Background information
- Born: 12 December 1957 (age 68)
- Origin: Waltham, Massachusetts
- Genres: Classical, Jazz
- Occupation: Pianist
- Years active: 1982-present
- Label: JRI Recordings
- Website: www.frederickmoyer.com

Frederick Moyer (born December 12, 1957) is an American concert pianist.

== Biography ==
Moyer first appeared with the Boston Symphony at age 14, performed with The Boston Pops as a teenager, and made his Carnegie Recital Hall debut in 1982. He attended the Curtis Institute of Music in Philadelphia while in high school, and graduated from Indiana University Bloomington.

Moyer has appeared as piano soloist with orchestras including the Cleveland, Philadelphia and Minnesota Orchestras, the St. Louis, Dallas, Indianapolis, Milwaukee, Baltimore, Pittsburgh, Houston, Singapore, Netherlands Radio, Latvian, Iceland and London Symphony Orchestras, the Buffalo, Hong Kong and Japan Philharmonic Symphony Orchestras, the National Symphony Orchestra of Brazil, and the major orchestras of Australia. His 25 recordings on the JRI Recordings label include the works of more than 30 composers. Composers who have written for him include Louis Calabro, Donal Fox, Kenneth Frazelle, Gordon Green, David Kechley, Ned Rorem, Andersen Viana and 1996 Pulitzer Prize winner George Walker. Moyer commissioned Walker's Piano Sonata No. 4 and presented it in its first recording in 1986.

== Discography ==
- J145 - Mendelssohn & Mussorgsky
- J143 - Beethoven: Complete Works for Cello and Piano with Nancy Green, Cello
- J140 - Rachmaninoff, Addinsell, Saint-Saens
- J124 - Tribute with Peter Tillotson, Bass and Peter Fraenkel, Drums
- J122 - Edward MacDowell & Clara Schumann: Two Piano Concerti; Edward MacDowell: Piano Concerto No. 2 in D Minor, Op. 23, with the Plovdiv Philharmonic Orchestra (Plovdiv, Bulgaria), Nayden Todorov, Conductor (Used with permission from Music Minus One); Clara Schumann: Piano Concerto in A Minor, Op. 7, MIDI orchestra created by Dan Kury, William Rounds, Solo Cello
- J121 - Vienna Revisited
- J120 - Cello Works of Arensky and Rachmaninoff, with Nancy Green, Cello
- J117 - Brahms/Piatti, Hungarian Dances, with Nancy Green, Cello
- J116 - Franz Schubert: Die Schöne Müllerin, with Benjamin Luxon, Baritone
- J114 - Richard Strauss - Enoch Arden, with Benjamin Luxon, Speaker
- J113 - Chopin
- J111 - Johannes Brahms - Two Sonatas for Piano and Cello, with Nancy Green, Cello
- J109 - American Journeys with the London Symphony Orchestra, Gisèle Ben-Dor, Conductor, Christine Michelle Smith, Flutist
- J108 - Camargo Guarnieri - The Twenty Estudos
- J107 - Rhapsody in Blue and other works
- J106 - Rachmaninoff Piano Works
- J105 - Frederick Moyer in Performance
- J104 - Of Old and New: A grandfather's tale
- J103 - Beethoven Piano Sonatas
- J102 - Green/Moyer Cello Recital, with Nancy Green, Cello
- J101 - Preludes, Fugues and Variations

== Technology ==
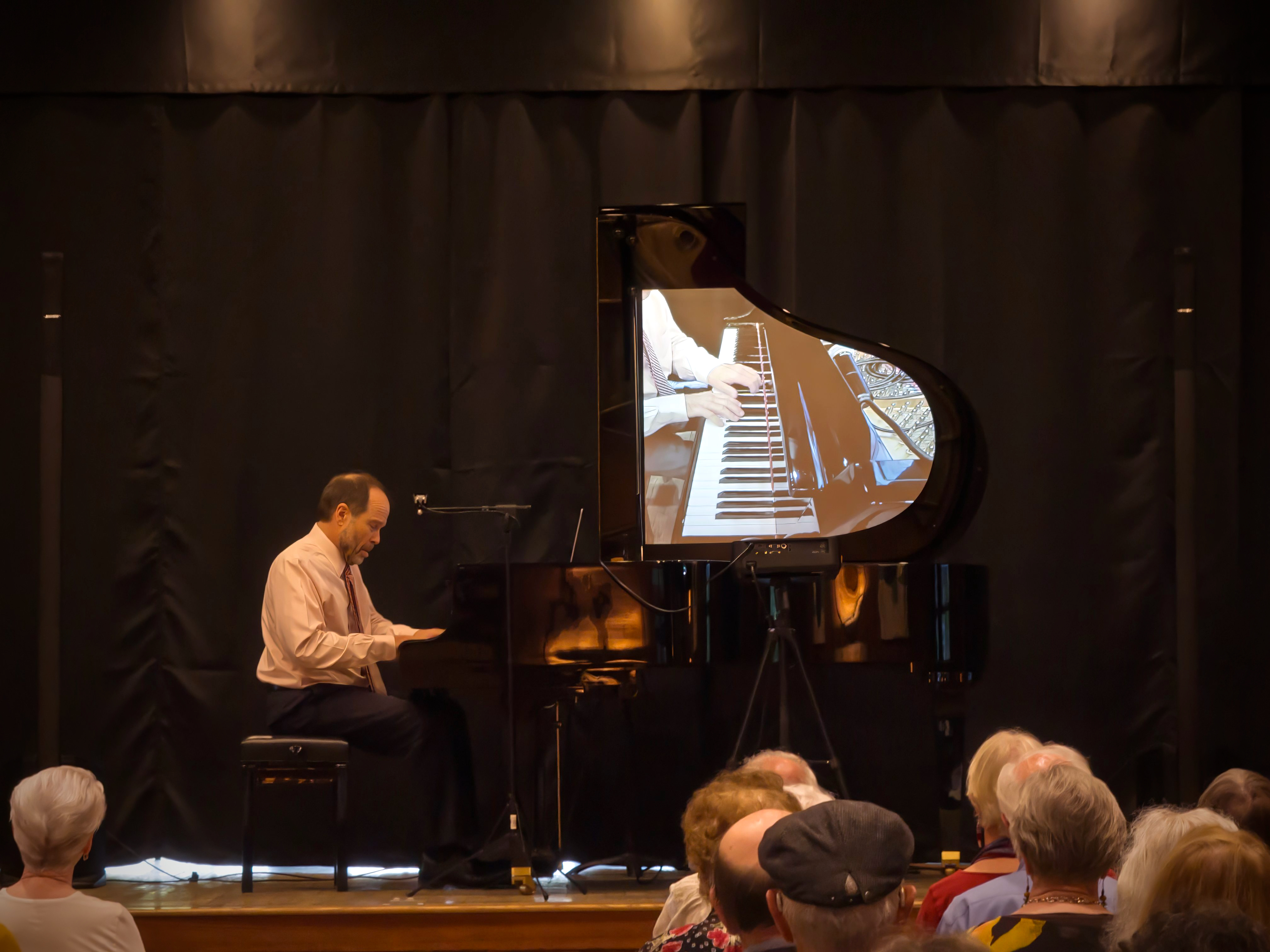
MoyerCam in use during a performance for the Brasstown Concert Association at the John C. Campbell Folk School

Moyer is the first pianist to make a commercial recording using the Bosendorfer 290 SE Recording Piano. His CD of Clara Schumann's Piano Concerto was the first commercial recording of a large-scale Romantic work using an orchestra created from sampled sounds. He has written many software programs to aid with practicing, analyzing, recording and performing music. (3) He has also designed software that helps a live soloist to stay synchronized with a recorded accompaniment.

Moyer has three patents to his name, including two for the MoyerCam, a projection of the keyboard and pianist's hands on the underside of the piano lid, and one for a CD Book on which he sells his recordings.

== Projects ==
=== Robert Schumann Fourth Piano Sonata ===
With the collaboration of electrical engineer and uncle Dr. Paul Green, Moyer unearthed the unfinished manuscript of a Fourth Piano Sonata by composer Robert Schumann. They have created a performable edition of the work, as well as a download application that lets you follow, on the same page, both Schumann's original and the newly printed version, while listening to Moyer play the music (each measure is highlighted in sync with the playing).”

=== Fred Moyer Jazz Trio ===
What can safely be called the only jazz group of its kind, the Fred Moyer Jazz Trio performs both its own improvisations and its note-for-note transcriptions of jazz trio performances of piano giants. Fred (along with the many bassists and drummers he collaborates with) create a score by transcribing every note of a favorite jazz performance, and then approach the score just as they would a chamber music work of Beethoven and Mozart, not changing the notes and staying true to the style, but interpreting the music in his own way. Fred Moyer has released two CDs with his jazz trio, and has worked with Hal Leonard Publications, releasing two books containing his transcriptions of jazz performances by Vince Guaraldi, Oscar Peterson, Erroll Garner, Horace Silver, Bill Evans, and others . These collections include a play-along CD.

During the COVID-19 pandemic and lockdown, Moyer created over 240 video concerts for concert venues across the United States, combining a wide variety of styles, pre-recorded professional orchestral and jazz accompaniment, concurrent video of musical colleagues, five cameras and computer-generated visual effects.
