= William Steck =

American violinist

Vern William Steck (February 18, 1934 in Powell, Wyoming – April 13, 2013) was an American violinist.

He was encouraged almost from birth to play music. His father was a violinist who had returned to his family's farm during the Depression, and his mother held a variety of jobs to finance their only child's musical education. At times, his parents were forced to choose between buying their son new toys and taking him to concerts by such violinists as Jascha Heifetz and Yehudi Menuhin.

His family settled in Philadelphia, where Steck studied at the Curtis Institute of Music. He graduated from the Philadelphia Musical Academy in 1952 and received a master's degree in music from the University of Texas in Austin in 1957.
