= Emanuel Melik-Aslanian =

Armenian-Iranian composer, classical music theorist and pianist (1915–2003)

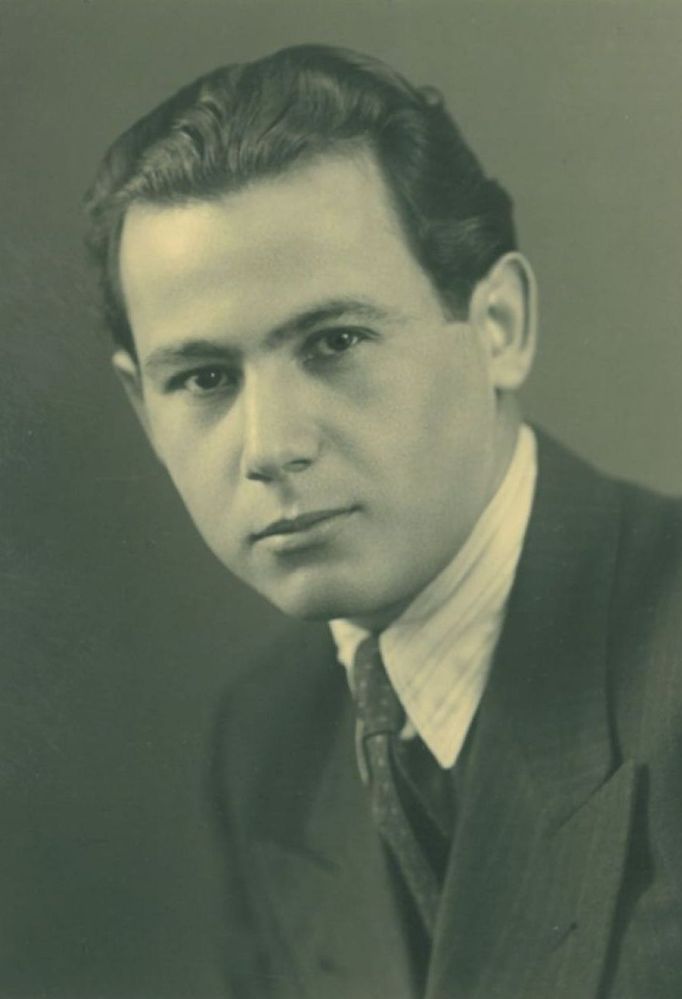

Background information
- Also known as: Emanuel Melik-Aslanian
- Born: 1915; Rostov, Russian Empire
- Died: 14 July 2003 (aged 88) Tehran, Iran
- Occupations: Composer, pianist
- Instrument: Piano

Emanuel Melik-Aslanian (Persian: امانوئل ملیک آصلانیان, Armenian: Էմանուէլ Մելիք- Ասլանեան; 1915 – 14 July 2003) was an Armenian-Iranian composer, classical music theorist and pianist.

== Biography ==
Emanuel Melik-Aslanian was born in 1915 to an Armenian family in Rostov, Russia. However, most of the mentioned sources state Tabriz as his birthplace. In an interview, he says: "My birthplace is written in my birth certificate, Tabriz, but in fact I was born in 1915 in Rostov. My parents were from Tabriz, but they lived in Rostov at that time."

His father Stepan was interested in music and after returning from a trip, he brought a piano with him. When Emanuel was not more than 4 years old, he would sit at the piano with his feet off the ground, playing the piano with one hand. He started playing the piano at the age of 9 with Sophia Amadoni, who was educated in Switzerland, in Tabriz. When he was 12, he played the piano in the Leon Gregorian Orchestra. When his father saw Emanuel's talent, he decided to study in Europe. For this reason, he traveled to Germany and made travel arrangements for his son and his wife. He then sent a message to them to join him. Emanuel and his mother left for Germany in 1928, when he was 13 years old.

He went to Hamburg, Germany and studied music at the city conservatory. His teacher during this period was the famous pianist and composer Conrad Ansorge, who was himself a student of Franz Liszt.

After graduating from the Hamburg Conservatory with a degree in piano, he traveled to Berlin with the intention of learning the scientific methods of composing and conducting an orchestra at the city's Higher School of Music. Luckily for Emanuel, one of the most famous and innovative German musicians, Paul Hindemith, taught at the school. In the midst of World War II, he held his first concert in 1319 in Berlin.

Emanuel benefited greatly from Hindemith's teachings and returned to Iran at the end of his composing career. In Iran, he studied Iranian music for several years, became a professor at the Higher Conservatory of Music, and gradually, in parallel with teaching, began to create music.

Malik Aslanian's first works, written for the piano, are an attempt to find a structure that is compatible with the characteristics of national music while adhering to international standards. The pieces in Chahargah and Dashti that are the result of this effort introduced him as a thoughtful composer from the very beginning. Aslanian then slowly went into orchestral and stage work, completing the whole work carefully every few years and waiting to evaluate the impact of its performance on Roudaki Hall and use it in the construction and arrangement of subsequent works. The most famous and significant work of Malik Aslanian is "The Legend of Creation". In 1953, at an international music assembly held in Tehran attended by 60 musicians, the Malik Aslanian dance variation was selected as the best example of oriental music.

His works have been performed many times by the world's great orchestras and the Tehran Symphony Orchestra under the direction of Farhad Meshkat, Heshmat Sanjari and Ali Rahbari.

== Death ==
Emanuel Melik-Aslanian died on the evening of 14 July 2003 at the age of 88 in Arad Hospital in Tehran. His body was buried in "Borastan Monastery" after the funeral in Vahdat Hall.

== Musical works ==
Some of Malik Aslanian's works are:

- Poem in memory of Rachmaninoff
- Fantasy Remember Brahms
- Variation of dance on Armenian theme
- Fantasy, on a Caucasian theme
- Butterfly in the crossroads on the occasion of Ibn Sina's millennium.
- Bursk (joke)
- Andante (with dulcimer and tonbak)
- Dawn (Oratorio)
- Dialogue (conversation for piano and orchestra)
- Sextet (for six instruments)
- The Legend of Creation (Ballet)
- Golbang (with choir and poetry group)
- Divertimento (for string orchestra)
- Parvane
