= Jiji Guitar =

South Korean musician (born 1993)

Jiji
- Born: Jiyeon Kim; 1993 (age 32–33); Seoul, South Korea
- Occupations: Guitarist, Composer, DJ
- Instruments: Guitar, Sampler

Jiyeon Kim (Korean: 김지연; born 1993), known professionally as Jiji Guitar, is a South Korean guitarist, composer, and DJ. She is known for being a member of the Grammy-nominated musical collective Wild Up and winning First Prize at the Concert Artists Guild's 2016 competition.

== Early life ==
Jiji was born in Seoul, South Korea. She began playing classical guitar when she was 9 years old. She was accepted into the Korea National University of Arts when she was 14, before eventually moving to the United States at the age of 15 when she was accepted into the Cleveland Institute of Music.

She studied at the Cleveland Institute of Music for two years before becoming one of the first two guitarists to study at the Curtis Institute of Music. She graduated from the Curtis Institute of Music in 2015. Jiji holds bachelor's degrees in guitar performance from the three aforementioned institutions.

== Career ==
In February 2011, Jiji performed on the NPR radio show From the Top. In March 2014, Jiji made her orchestral concert debut in a Kansas City Orchestra performance conducted by Carlos Miguel Prieto. In 2015, she performed on the Hong Kong program RTHK's The Works as part of Duo RenJi with viola player Ren Martin-Doike. When the guitar residency returned to the Banff Centre's recital programs, Jiji was one of the first guitarists to perform a recital at the Centre in July 2015.

In February 2016, Jiji's graduation recital was aired on PBS as part of the program On Stage at Curtis. In 2016, Jiji was also awarded the Victor and Sono Elmaleh First Prize for her performance in the Concert Artists Guild's 2016 Victor Elmaleh Competition. After winning the 2017 BMI commissioning award, she commissioned a guitar composition by Nina C. Young, which she first performed at the Green Music Center's Weil Hall.

After receiving her Master of Music degree from Yale School of Music, Jiji joined the faculty at the Arizona State University School of Music as an assistant professor in August 2018. In 2018, Jiji also had a pre-concert recital before the Mostly Mozart Festival at the David Geffen Hall in the Lincoln Center. Jiji released her first EP Underglow in May 2018.

In 2019, Jiji played the guitar on the premiere recording for Paul Lansky's composition “Talking Guitars” featured on the release Paul Lansky: The Long and Short of It, released by Bridge Records. In 2019, Jiji also toured with Cuarteto Latinoamericano, collaborating with them on several performances. She also had her debut performance as part of the Lincoln Center's Great Performers in April 2019. On November 13, 2019, Jiji performed the world premiere of Hilary Purrington's guitar concerto “Harp of Nerves” with the American Composers Orchestra at Carnegie Hall. Jiji is also a member of the music collective Wild Up, which was nominated for Best Chamber Music/Small Ensemble Performance in 2019 for a recording of “The Pieces That Fall to the Earth” by Christopher Cerrone.

In February 2021, she held a live stream concert performed at Kansas City's 1900 building without a live audience. The concert was done in partnership with Kansas City Guitar Society.

Jiji is currently working on a new recording entitled UNBOUND. She is also scheduled to perform with Sinfonietta Riga in 2021.

== Discography ==
=== Solo works ===
- Underglow (2018)

=== Collaborations ===
- Paul Lansky: The Long and Short of It (with Paul Lansky) (2019)
