= Angliss Hospital =

Geography
- Location: 39 Albert Street, Upper Ferntree Gully, Victoria, Australia
- Coordinates: 37.898618°S 145.314191°E

Organisation
- Type: Public

History
- Founded: 1939

Links
- Website: Official Webpage
- Other links: List of hospitals in Australia

Angliss Hospital is a public hospital in Upper Ferntree Gully, Victoria, Australia, located on the corner of Albert Street and Talaskia Road. The hospital is a member of the Eastern Health network, and is located near a number of medical facilities that support the hospital, such as Angliss House and Chandler House.

== History ==
The hospital was originally named William Angliss Hospital and then changed to Angliss Hospital. It was established in 1939 and named after Sir William Charles Angliss, a respected local politician and philanthropist who contributed financially to the hospital's foundation. The Angliss family continued to play a significant role in the hospitals growth and management, well into the 20th Century.

In 1945 a decision was made to relocate the hospital due to increased demand, and in 1958, Jacobena Angliss opened the hospital in its now present location. Funding from the Angliss' charitable foundation allowed for the hospital to build an additional 27 beds in 1965. In 2017 the hospital celebrated the 100,000th birth to have occurred at the hospital.

== Facilities ==
The Angliss Hospital is considered a medium metropolitan hospital by the Australian Institute of Health and Welfare, and has an Emergency Department, Radiology, Midwifery, Intensive Care, Obstetric, Paediatric and Rehabilitation departments. In addition to these facilities, the hospital operates the aged care facility located on adjacent Edward Street. The Intensive Care Unit (ICU) at Angliss Hospital was completed in 2018, at a cost of $20 million, adding 14 intensive care beds to the hospital as well as a new short-stay expansion of the hospital's emergency department.

== Future expansion ==
In 2018, the recently re-elected Andrews government pledged to expand the hospital with an additional 25 hospital beds. The planned expansion is considered an extension of the most recent development at the hospital completed in 2018, which added an intensive care unit to the hospital and a fourth floor. The cost of the expansion is around $170 million and includes an additional 120 beds at a nearby aged care facility.
