= Astra Chamber Music Society =

Contemporary music organisation

The Astra Chamber Music Society is a concert organisation for choral music and contemporary performance, based in Melbourne, Australia and under the musical direction of John McCaughey and Andrew Byrne.

Astra presents an annual series of concerts featuring the Astra Choir. The concerts present new and original work from all musical periods, ranging from medieval tropes and Vietnamese work songs through recent European and American music to newly commissioned Australian compositions. Each Astra program is planned as an event that engages the audience with the stimulus of contrasting materials, extending from the sound of voices to combinations with instruments, electro-acoustics, text and theatre.

Astra also publishes CD recordings of the work of the Astra Choir and associated artists. It also has a continuing project to publish scores of the works of the influential Australian composer, performer and educator Keith Humble.

== History ==
Astra was formed in 1951 as an orchestra of women musicians under the direction of Madame Asta Flack, a violinist and conductor who had migrated to Australia from Lithuania.

In 1958, George Logie-Smith became musical director, extending the orchestra to include men and a larger wind section and founding the Astra Choir. Over a period of 20 years, he developed links with Australian composers as well as giving performance of choral and chamber orchestral repertoire rarely heard at that time (for example the Bach Passions, Stravinsky's Les Noces, and works by Bartok, Britten, Penderecki et al.)

Since John McCaughey became musical director in 1978, the Astra Choir has provided the principal focus of concerts, joined by many of Australia's leading contemporary instrumental performers as guests.

Robert Smallwood was Director of Astra in the period 1983–4, and other guest directors (Joan Pollock, Graeme Leak, Kenneth Gaburo, Sue Healey, Anne Thompson, William Henderson and Allan Walker) have extended the Choir's work into the domains of film, dance and improvisation.

Since 1978, Astra has performed over 1280 individual works by about 430 composers (170 of them Australian) in almost 70 different venues throughout Melbourne and regional Victoria.

== Funding ==
Astra is funded by the Australia Council for the Arts, Arts Victoria, the William Angliss Trust, Diana Gibson and a number of private benefactors.

== Awards ==
Astra's contribution to musical and performing life in Australia has been recognised by numerous awards and commissions including:

- Sidney Myer Performing Arts Award 1987
- Australian Music Centre's 1998 National Award for the Best Australian Composition (for Lawrence Whiffin's 'Murchitt - a Daydream'),
- Australian Music Centre's 2000 National and Victorian Awards for Outstanding Contribution to Australian Music to Astra's Director, John McCaughey
