= James Helme Sutcliffe =

American classical composer

James Helme Sutcliffe (26 November 1929 in Suzhou China – 11 December 2000 in Berlin) was an American composer and music critic.

== Biography ==
Born in 1929 in Suzhou, China, James Helme Sutcliffe escaped in 1941 after the Japanese attack on China with his parents to Australia. He received his first musical education (piano, viola and music theory) at Geelong College from George Logie-Smith and later at Melbourne University Conservatorium of Music from Roy Shepherd.

After moving to the United States he studied piano and composition at Juilliard School in New York (Bachelor of Science Degree in May 1953) and at Eastman School of Music. For four years he taught at Duquesne University in Pittsburgh and went then to Europe where he continued his studies as répétiteur at the Schauspielhaus Zürich, in Bayreuth and in Köln (Cologne).

Since 1963 he lived in Berlin and worked among his activities as composer, teacher for piano, composition and music theory foremost as a music critic for the International Herald Tribune as soon as for many important opera magazines like Opera Magazine, Opera News, Opera Canada, Musical America and Opernwelt.

His works were performed by musicians like Alexander Frey, Steven Isserlis and Wolfgang Boettcher. His "Academic Festival March", is the alma mater of the University of North Carolina at Charlotte. Dr. Loy Witherspoon, professor of religious studies, commissioned the March in 1965 when he learned that Charlotte College would become a campus in the University of North Carolina system. The March was first performed in 1967 at the installation of Dean W. Colvard as UNC Charlotte's first chancellor. Afterwards, it was performed as a recessional at every Commencement during Dean W. Colvard's as chancellor. When UNC Charlotte founder Bonnie Cone heard the March, she said, "I can hear an alma mater in it," referring to a hymn-like refrain. Dr. Robert Rieke, a professor of history, also heard an alma mater in it. On a 1990 trip to Germany, Rieke visited Sutcliffe, picked up a recording of the March, and began writing words to fit the final refrain. On Christmas Eve 1991, he sent Bonnie Cone the words and music as a Christmas present to her and to the university, from which he had retired a year earlier. Chancellor James. H. Woodward approved the composition as the university's Alma Mater in April 1992. It was sung for the first time at the following May Commencement and has been performed at every Commencement since.

== Works (selection) ==
- Introduction and Allegro for String Orchestra
- Preludium and Chorale for Orchestra, 1957
- Sinfonietta, 1958
- Academic Festival March, 1965, Alma Mater of the University of North Carolina at Charlotte, first performed 1967 at the installation of the first chancellor of the University of North Carolina at Charlotte, Dean W. Colvard.
- Der Tanzmeister for string orchestra, 1993
- Avatar for violoncello and piano, 1994, first performed 1997 in London by Steven Isserlis
- Five Haiku for Soprano and Chamber Orchestra
- Chorale Variations, In Memoriam Wolf Lange for organ, 1996
- Sonatina for piano, 2000
- Two Entertainments for piano, 2000

Sutcliffe also produced many arrangements of folk songs and Christmas carols for several instruments and voices. His works were published by Boosey and Hawkes in London.

== See also ==
- University of North Carolina at Charlotte

== Notes ==
- James Helme Sutcliffe, A Life for Music Benjamin Britten: A Biographical Sketch in: The Opera Quarterly 1986/4, Oxford 1986.
- James Helme Sutcliffe, Die Bühnenwerke Benjamin Brittens, Berlin 1986.
- James Helme Sutcliffe, Multicultural 'Oedipe' in Berlin in: International Herald Tribune, 21. Februar 1996
- Paula Best (Hg.), Master Series 1, Autumn 1997, Wigmore Hall, London, 1997, S. 9 und 11.
