= John Carmichael (composer) =

Australian musician

John Carmichael OAM (born 5 October 1930) is an Australian pianist, composer and music therapist who has long been resident in the United Kingdom. One of his best known works is the Concierto folklorico for piano and string orchestra. His works for piano form much of his musical output, although he composes for many other instruments. His work is described as expressive and lyrical.

== Biography ==
John Carmichael was born in Melbourne in 1930. He studied piano with Margaret Schofield and in 1947 won a scholarship to the Melbourne Conservatorium of Music, where his teacher was Raymond Lambert. He also studied composition with Dorian Le Gallienne. Moving to Europe, he studied at the Paris Conservatoire with Marcel Ciampi and in London with Arthur Benjamin (whom he first met in Australia) and later with Anthony Milner, a pupil of Mátyás Seiber.

Carmichael was a pioneer in the field of music therapy; he developed music teaching and music appreciation projects at Stoke Mandeville Hospital and Netherden Mental Hospital in Surrey, and worked for the Council for Music Therapy in London. Between 1958 and 1963, he was music director of the Spanish dance company Eduardo Y Navarra, during which time he became fascinated by Spanish folk idiom. He toured internationally with the group, including an Australian visit.

Carmichael, who has lived in Chiswick since the 1960s, has maintained active connections with Australia despite being away for most of his professional life. In 2012 he was awarded the Order of Australia Medal 'for services to the Arts as composer and concert pianist'. His 90th birthday was celebrated there by a concert in Melbourne featuring the two piano concertos, Sea Changes and the Latin American Dances.

== Music ==
Carmichael's melodic and rhythmic neo-Romantic music has been compared to that of his teacher, the composer-pianist Arthur Benjamin and frequently shows Spanish and French influences. His style was established early in his career and has not greatly changed in the subsequent seventy years, during which he has kept composing.

His interest in flamenco led to the composition of his best-known work, the 1965 Concierto folklorico for piano and string orchestra. He has twice recorded the concerto with himself as soloist, both times with the West Australian Symphony Orchestra (1970, conducted by Tibor Paul; 1984, conducted by David Measham). In 1984, he appeared as soloist in a performance of the work at the "Last Night of the Proms" during the 10th Perth International Arts Festival. His much later Piano Concerto No 2 also shows the influence of flamenco. It received its premiere in 2011 and has been recorded with the soloist Antony Gray.

In 1980, his Phoenix Flute Concerto was premiered at the Sydney Opera House with James Galway as soloist and the Sydney Symphony Orchestra under Louis Frémaux. Galway also played in the U.S. premiere the same year, at the Hollywood Bowl by the Los Angeles Philharmonic under Michael Tilson Thomas. Galway has recorded the piece. The Trumpet Concerto (1972) has been recorded by John Wallace and the BBC Scottish Symphony Orchestra, conducted by Simon Wright.

The piano has an important place in Carmichael's list of works. He has collaborated with Australian pianists including Antony Gray and Victor Sangiorgio, as well as with the Carles & Sofia piano duo, who have recorded Carmichael's complete works for piano four hands for the label KNS-classical. His Piano Quartet Sea Changes was premiered in London in 2000 and recorded in 2004.

On the Green for wind nonet, premiered in London in September 2007, was written to celebrate "the green spaces of West London where the composer has lived for the last 40 years". A CD of his more recent music, including On the Green, Short Cuts for flute, oboe, clarinet and piano (2007), the Piano Concerto No. 2 (2011), the Piano Trio Toward the Light (2020), and the three movement Contrasts for solo viola (2020), was issued by Divine Art in 2024.

== Works ==
- Damon Suite (1946)
- Bagatelle (1956)
- Puppet Show (1958; piano duet)
- Tourbillon (piano 1959; piano four hands 2006)
- Fetes champetres (1960; clarinet and piano or orchestra)
- Concierto folklorico (1965; piano and string orchestra)
- Country Fair (1972; clarinet and orchestra)
- Trumpet Concerto (1972)
- Thredbo Suite (1980; flute and piano, or flute and orchestra)
  - 'Air from the High Mountain'
  - 'Nocturne'
  - 'Sleigh Ride to Thredbo'
- Flute Concerto, Phoenix (1980; flute and orchestra)
- Fantasy Concerto (1988; flute and orchestra)
- Aria and Finale for soprano, saxophone and piano (1990)
- Saxophone Concerto (1990)
- Latin American Suite (1990; Bahama Rumba, Habanera, Joropo)(piano 4 hands 2001: Bahama Rumba, Joropo, Habanera, Jongo)
- Bravura Waltzes (piano 1990; 4-hands 2003)
- From the Dark Side (1992; 1. The Secret Ceremony. 2. Before Nightfall. 3. Elegy. 4. Dance with the Devil)
- Dark Scenarios (piano four hands, 1994)
- Spider Song (1995)
- A Little Night Music (1997), suite for flute and piano: 1. Caribbean Moonrise; 2. Quiet Evening; 3. Carnival Night)
- Sea Changes (2000; piano quartet)
- Sonatine (2001: Pastorale; Interlude; Toccata)
- Sun Worship, concert aria (2001; soprano, clarinet and piano)
- Serenade for flute and strings (2002)
- Voyage in the Dark (2003), two-act opera, libretto based on Jean Rhys
- Fantasy sonata for flute and piano (2005)
- Latin American Dances for alto saxophone and piano (2005)
- Troubled Dream (d’après Franz Liszt) (2006)
- On the Green for wind ensemble (2007)
- Hommages – Manuel de Falla, Francis Poulenc, Gabriel Fauré, Maurice Ravel (piano and piano four hands, 2008)
- Escapades (2009; Flute choir)
- Sonata: Music grave and gay (2010, for oboe or soprano saxophone and piano)
- Piano Concerto No. 2 (premièred in 2011)
- Nocturne for Eve for piano (2012)
- Serenade for flute and piano (2016)
- Short Cuts for flute, oboe, clarinet and piano (2016)
- Piano Trio Toward the Light (2020)
- Aria and Finale for viola and piano (2022)
- Contrasts for viola and piano (2022)
