= Box Hill Cemetery =

Cemetery in Melbourne, Australia

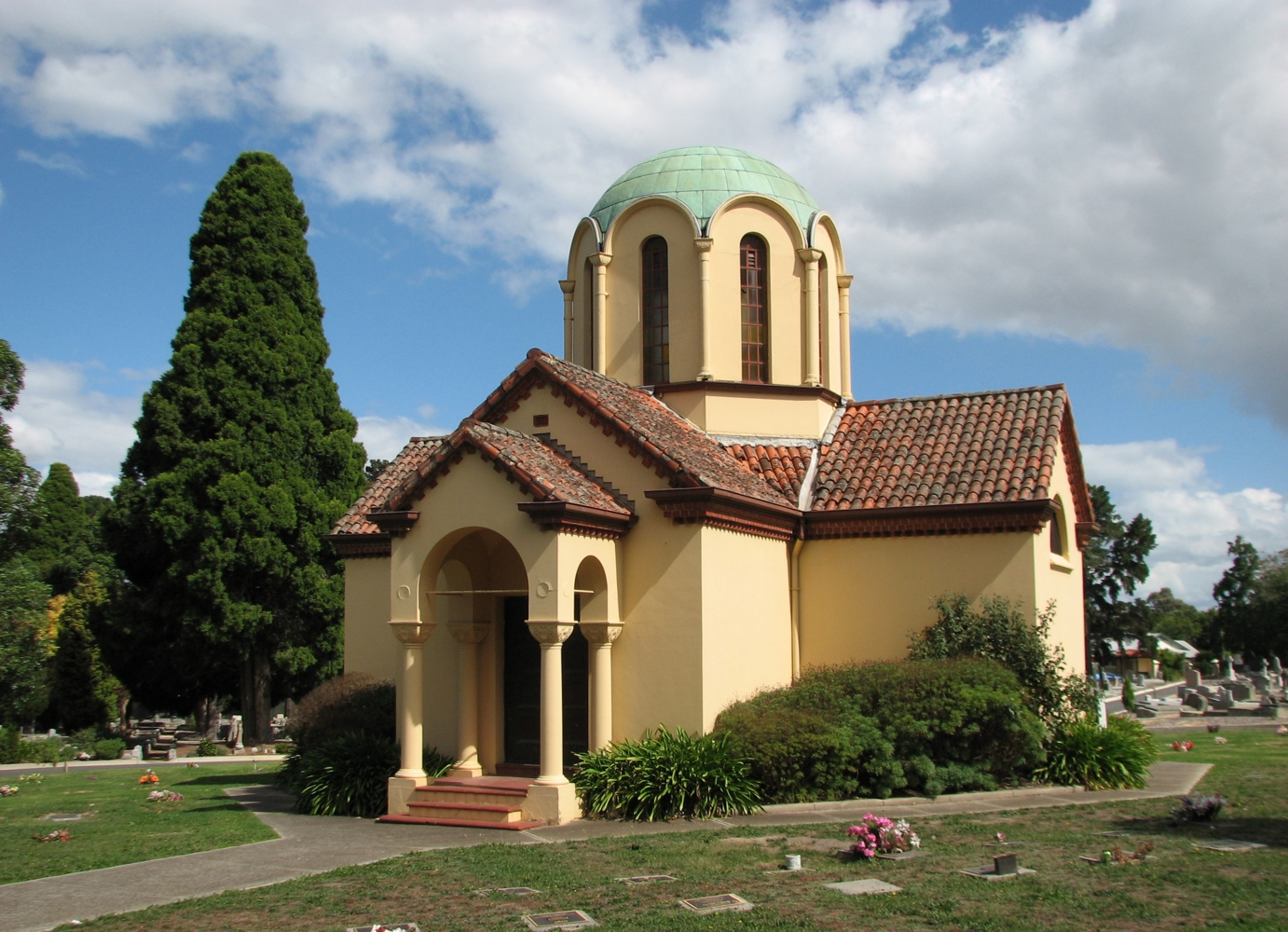
- Columbarium

- Location of the cemetery in Greater Metropolitan Melbourne
- Interactive map of Box Hill Cemetery

Details
- Established: 1873
- Location: Box Hill, Melbourne, Victoria
- Country: Australia
- Coordinates: 37°49′21″S 145°8′8″E
- Style: Myer memorial: Edwin Lutyens; Yuncken, Freeman, Freeman & Griffiths; Columbarium: Rodney Alsop; A. Bramwell Smith
- Size: 12.5 hectares (31 acres)
- No. of interments: 50,000
- Website: Box Hill Cemetery; Box Hill Cemetery Mapping Portal

Victorian Heritage Register
- Official name: Box Hill Cemetery Columbarian and Myer Memorial
- Type: Registered place
- Designated: 9 October 2003
- Reference no.: H2045
- Heritage overlay no.: HO58
- Category: Cemeteries and Burial Sites

The Box Hill Cemetery is a cemetery located in Box Hill, an eastern suburb of Melbourne, in Victoria, Australia. The 12.5-hectare (31-acre) site is known as the resting place of notable figures from Melbourne. The original 4.0-hectare (10-acre) site was extended in 1886 and again in 1935. Approximately 50,000 decedents were interred since the cemetery was gazetted and commenced operations in 1873.

Located within the cemetery are a columbarium and memorial to the Myer family that were added to the Victorian Heritage Register on 9 October 2003 in recognition of its historical, aesthetic, social and architectural significance. The site was also added by the Victorian branch of the National Trust to a non-statutory heritage list on 17 October 1997.

== Architecture ==
The Myer memorial was designed by British architect Edwin Lutyens in association with local architects Yuncken, Freeman, Freeman & Griffiths. The columbarium, a brick building in the style of a Byzantine church, was designed by architects Rodney Alsop and A. Bramwell Smith and constructed in 1929.

== History ==
The first moves to establish a public cemetery at Box Hill were made in 1872 when 4.9 hectares (12 acres) was set aside and eight trustees were appointed at a public meeting. A grant of £35 was received from the Government for the erection of a fence around the site. The area was part of a large reserve bounded on two sides by Whitehorse Road and Britnells Road (now Middleborough Road) from which the Sagoe Common School and police paddock had been excised.

The first burial took place the day after the cemetery was officially gazetted on 30 August 1873. Prior to this, burials took place on land surrounding the nearby United Methodist Church and in the small Lutheran cemetery established at Waldau (Doncaster) in 1860. Public cemeteries had also been established at Kew and Burwood.

The Box Hill Cemetery was subsequently enlarged on two occasions. A small adjoining section, still referred to as the 'New Survey', was gazetted in 1886, following the extension of the railway line from Box Hill to Lilydale. In 1935 a further adjoining 4.9 hectares (12 acres) was purchased by the Box Hill Council to bring the cemetery to its present size of approximately 12.5 hectares (31 acres). Part of this former area included the police paddock.

From 1875 until 1973, the main entrance to the cemetery was from Whitehorse Road. The fine entrance gates and pillars to this approach still stand today, but they are no longer part of the cemetery. The present entrance from Middleborough Road was established in 1973 to eliminate the need for funeral traffic to cross the railway line, and the Whitehorse Road entrance avenue was passed over to the then City of Box Hill in 1979.

Two notable features within the cemetery include: the large lychgate or commemorative arch built in 1923 to mark the 50th anniversary of the cemetery; and the columbarium built in 1929 as a repository for cremated remains. Designed by architects Rodney Alsop and A. Bramwell Smith and built by T. F. Crabbe this building is in the form of a Greek cross; it has a Spanish-tiled gable roof and octagonal tower with a copper dome. While the exterior appearance has a distinctive Mediterranean flavour, the proportions of the exterior are Byzantine.

Another interesting item is the large iron bell hanging over the entrance to the current office. Cast in Manchester, England, in 1886, the bell originally served the Box Hill Fire Brigade at its previous Watts Street premises where it was used to call-out volunteer fire-fighters to emergencies over many years. In 1927, the Brigades Board presented the bell to the Box Hill Cemetery.

With few remaining new burial sites available, the first stage of a community mausoleum was constructed in 2002 to provide 130 crypt spaces on five levels. Crypts are faced with shutters of imported granite, and distinctive architectural features include wide verandahs on all sides supported by brick and rendered pillars in California bungalow style. A second stage, offering a further 216 crypts on six levels was built in the same style in the first stage was designed by Brearley Architects and Urban Designers and the subsequent stage by GHD. Both buildings were constructed by Milne-Miller Constructions. The complex was officially opened by the Hon. Daniel Andrews (then Parliamentary Secretary to the Minister for Health) on 20 November 2005.

A third stage of the community mausoleum was also designed by GHD and built by Milne-Miller Constructions in 2012, to provide a further 270 crypt spaces.

A range of themed historical walking tours of the cemetery (visiting various famous graves) are periodically conducted by members of the Box Hill Historical Society. Further information on these tours is available from the Box Hill Historical Society.

== Records search ==
The Box Hill Cemetery record searches for genealogical or any other purpose may be conducted through the cemetery website at any time, by simply selecting the 'Find a Grave or Memorial' function. A map of the selected site and surrounding area may also be printed to help visitors find specific graves and memorials.

== Notable interments ==
- Dame Jacobena Angliss, philanthropist
- Sir William Angliss, businessman, politician and philanthropist
- Robert Beckett, politician
- Maurice Blackburn, politician and lawyer
- Edouard Borovansky, ballet dancer, choreographer and director
- Cyril P. Callister, inventor of Vegemite
- Sir Ian Clunies Ross, chairman of the CSIRO
- Sir George James Coles, owner of Coles Supermarkets
- C.J. Dennis, poet
- Joy Hester, artist
- Sir John Higgins, businessman and metallurgist
- Frank Hyett, politician
- Nellie Constance Martyn, businesswoman
- Sir George McBeath, businessman
- James Whiteside McCay, general and politician
- James Menzies, politician, father of Sir Robert Menzies
- Ken Myer, businessman and philanthropist
- Dame Merlyn Myer, philanthropist
- Sidney Myer, businessman and philanthropist, founder of Myer
- Frank O'Connor, Secretary of the Department of Supply in the 1950s
- Samuel Pethebridge, politician, soldier and Secretary of Australian Department of Defence in World War I
- Lillian Pyke, children's author and novelist
- Harold Crofton Sleigh, merchant and ship-owner
- Jane Sutherland, artist
- George Tallis, theatrical entrepreneur

== War Graves ==
The cemetery contains the war graves of 67 Commonwealth service personnel. There are 16 from World War I, the highest ranking being Brigadier-General Sir Samuel Pethebridge, who died in January 1918, and 51 from World War II.

== Box Hill Cemetery Trust ==
Box Hill Cemetery is governed by a dedicated Trust, which has continued since 1873. The Trust is a statutory board, responsible to the Government of Victoria for strategic oversight and on-going stewardship of the cemetery. Trust-members are appointed under the Victorian Cemeteries and Crematoria Act 2003, by the Governor in Council on recommendation of the State Minister for Health.

== Gallery ==
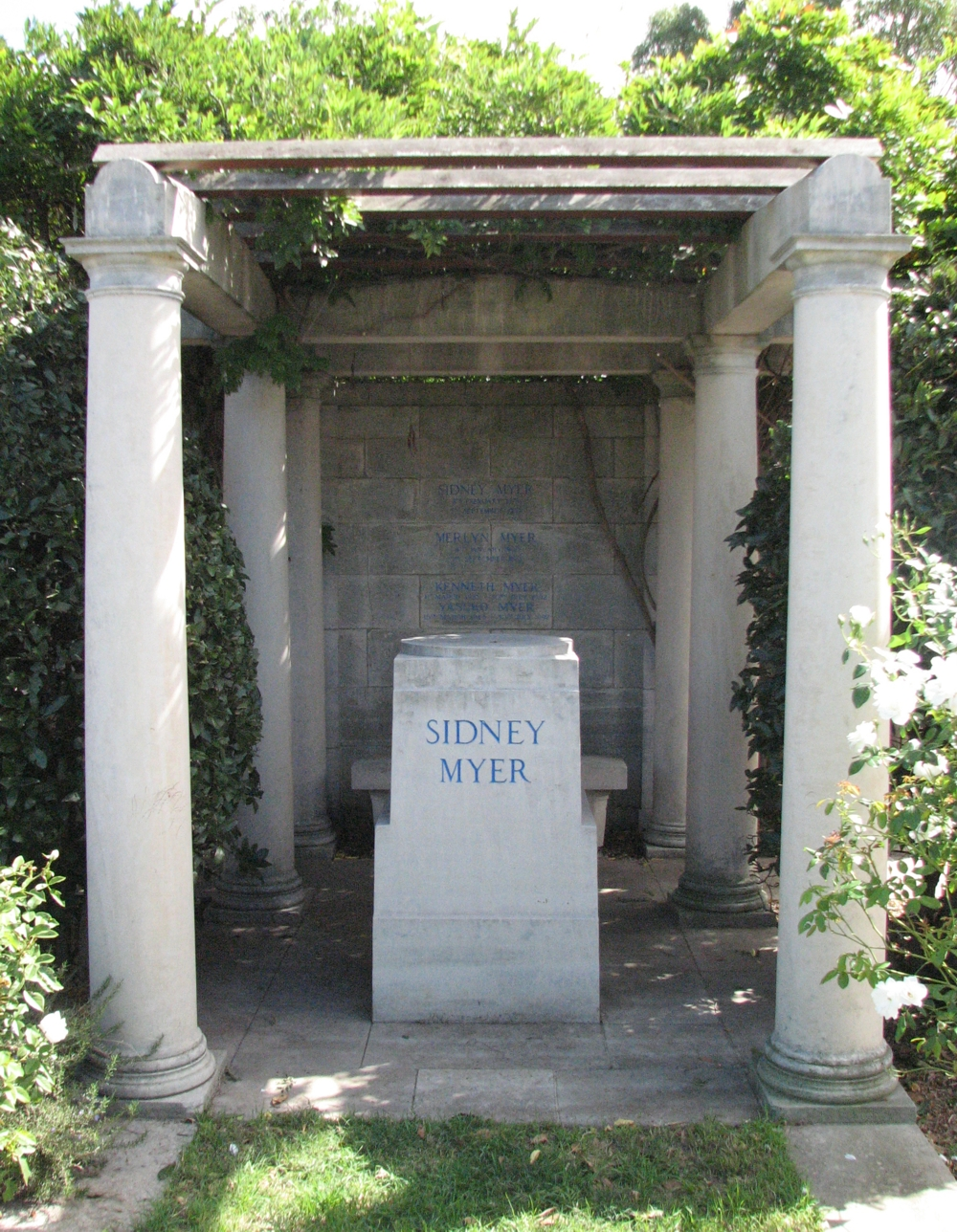
Myer family grave

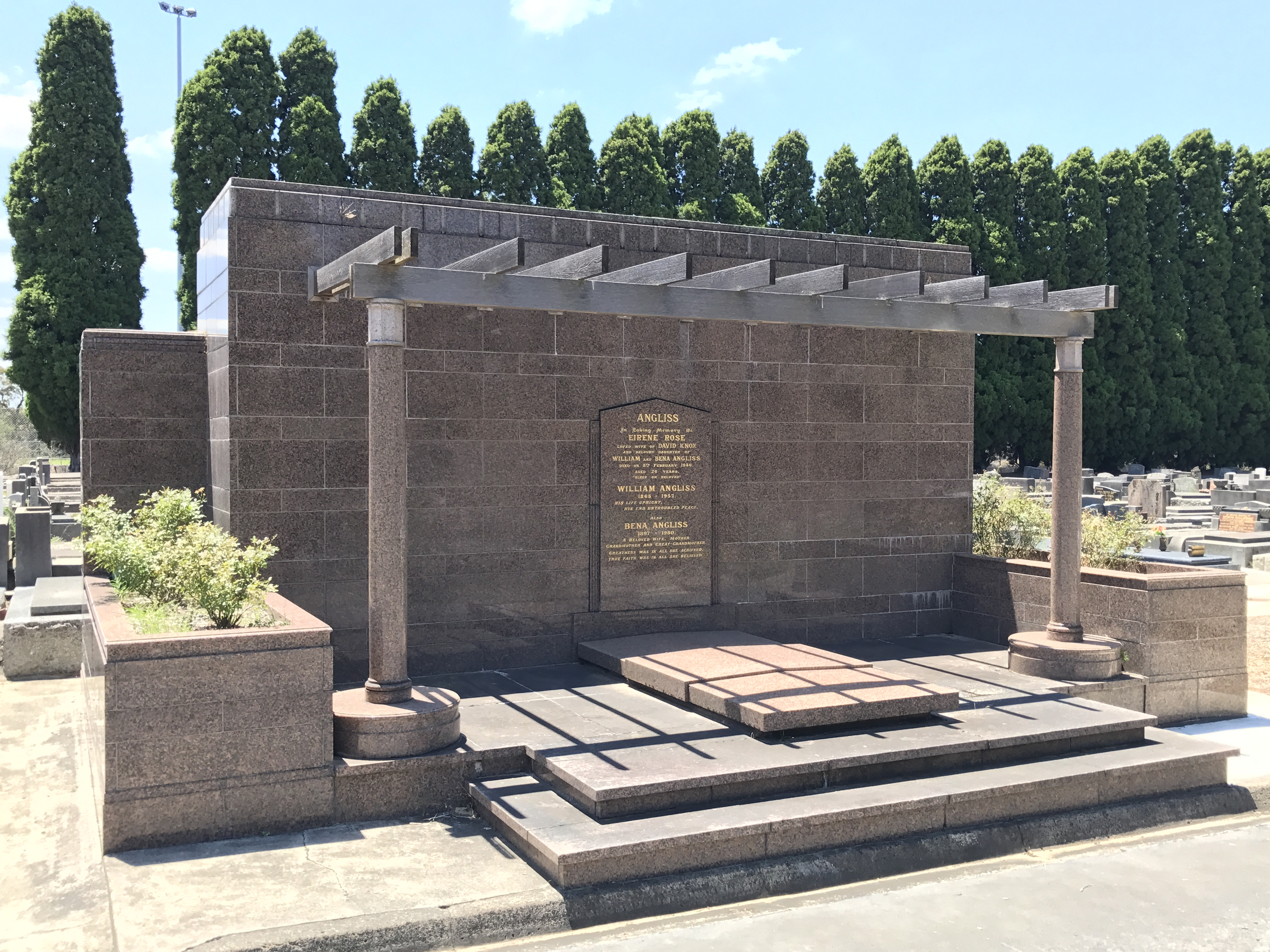
Angliss family grave

Grave of Sir George and Lady Tallis

Grave of Sir John Dame Frances Higgins

Grave of Sir James Coles of Coles Supermarkets

Grave of Sir George McBeath

Grave of James and Kate Menzies, parents of Prime Minister Sir Robert Menzies

== See also ==
- List of cemeteries in Melbourne
