= Wanderer Fantasy =

1822 composition by Franz Schubert

Fantasie in C major
- Wanderer Fantasy
- by Franz Schubert
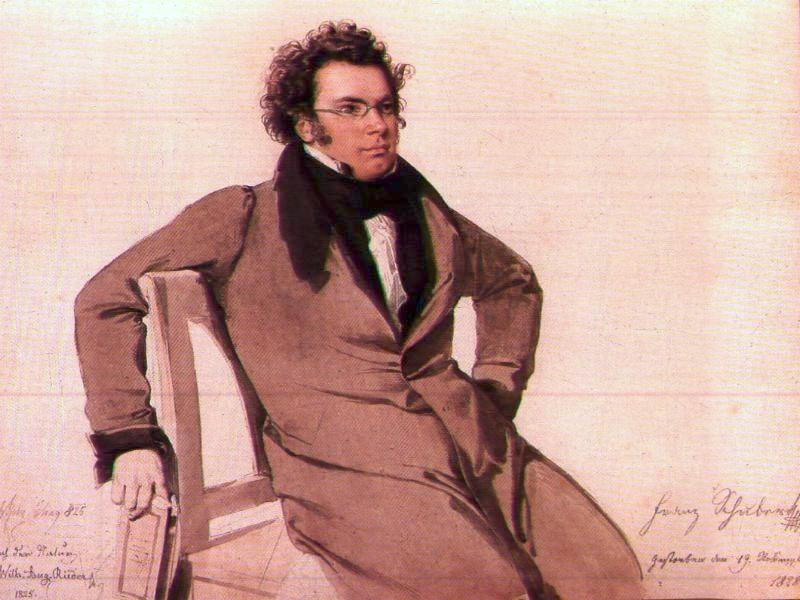
- Watercolour of Schubert by Wilhelm August Rieder (1825)
- Catalogue: D. 760
- Opus: 15
- Period: Romantic era
- Based on: Der Wanderer, D. 493
- Composed: 1822
- Dedication: Carl Emanuel Liebenberg von Zsittin
- Published: March 1829
- Publisher: Anton Diabelli
- Duration: c. 21 minutes
- Movements: 4
- Scoring: Solo piano

The Fantasie in C major, Op. 15, D. 760, popularly known as the Wanderer Fantasy, is a four-movement fantasy for solo piano composed by Franz Schubert in 1822. It is widely considered Schubert's most technically demanding composition for the piano. Schubert himself said "let the devil himself play the stuff," in reference to his own inability to do so properly.

== Historical background ==
Schubert composed this work in late 1822, just after breaking off work on the Unfinished Symphony while sketching its incomplete scherzo. It was written for and dedicated to Carl Emanuel Liebenberg von Zsittin, who had studied piano with Johann Nepomuk Hummel, in the hope of some remuneration from the dedication.

It is not only a technically formidable challenge for the performer, but also a structurally formidable four-movement work combining theme-and-variations with sonata form. Each movement transitions into the next instead of ending with a final definitive cadence, and each starts with a variation of the opening phrase of his lied "Der Wanderer" (D. 489). The second movement, marked "adagio," states the theme virtually identically as it is in the song, whereas the three fast movements begin with variants in diminution (shortened note values): the first movement, "allegro con fuoco ma non troppo," a monothematic sonata form in which the second theme is another variant; the third, "presto," a scherzo in triple meter; and the finale, marked simply "allegro," starting as a quasi-fugue and growing increasingly demanding on technical and interpretive skills as it storms on to its conclusion.

== Structure ==
I. Allegro con fuoco

II. Adagio

III. Presto

IV. Allegro
Performed by Daniel Blanch

The whole work is based on one single basic motif from which all themes are developed. This motif is distilled from the theme of the C♯ minor second movement, which is a sequence of variations on a melody taken from the lied "Der Wanderer", which Schubert wrote in 1816. It is this set of variations from which the work's popular name is derived.

The four movements are played without a break. The first movement (Allegro con fuoco ma non troppo in C major) and the second movement (Adagio, beginning in C♯ minor and ends in E major), is followed by a scherzo presto in A♭ major and the technically transcendental finale, which starts in fugato returning to the key of C major and becomes more and more virtuosic as it moves toward its thunderous nonfugal conclusion.

A performance of the fantasy would typically last roughly 21 minutes.

== Influence on Liszt ==
The Hungarian composer Franz Liszt, who was fascinated by the Wanderer Fantasy, transcribed it for piano and orchestra (S. 366, premiered in Weimar in 1851 by Julius Egghard) and two pianos (S. 653). He additionally edited the original score and added some various interpretations in ossia, and made a complete rearrangement of the final movement (S. 565a).

The work's structure was highly influential on Liszt's Sonata in B Minor, S. 178.

== Recordings ==
Below are incomplete lists of recordings of the Fantasy:

Original version
Year	Pianist	Label	Uninterrupted?	Live recording
1942	Elly Ney	Siemens Spezial	No	
1949	Guido Cantelli	Urania	Yes	X
1956	Gary Graffman	RCA Victor	No	
1957	Claudio Arrau	EMI Records	No	
1961	Bruce Hungerford	Ipam Records	Yes	
1963	Leon Fleisher	Epic Records	No	
1963	Sviatoslav Richter	Warner Classics	No	
1968	Wilhelm Kempff	Deutsche Grammophon	No	
1972	Alfred Brendel	Philips Classics	Yes	
1973	Ervin Nyiregyhazi	Sonetto Classics	Yes	X
1978	Vladimir Feltsman	CBS Masterworks	Yes	
1979	Peter Frankl	Vox Records	Yes	
1982	Svetla Protich	MIK Balkanton	No	
1986	Murray Perahia	Sony BMG	Yes	
1987	Sviatoslav Richter	Warner Classics	No	
1989	Alfred Brendel	Philips Classics	No	
1989	Elisabeth Leonskaja	Warner Classics (Apex)	No	
1991	Evgeny Kissin	Deutsche Grammophon	No	
1993	Anatol Ugorski	Deutsche Grammophon	No	
1994	Jenő Jandó	Naxos	Yes	
1996	Nikolai Demidenko	Hyperion	Yes	
1996	Maurizio Pollini	Deutsche Grammophon	No	
2000	András Schiff	ECM Records	Yes	
2002	Jouni Somero	FinnConcert	Yes	X
2002	Cecilia Soria	Disques VDE-GALLO	No	
2004	Lang Lang	Deutsche Grammophon	No	X
2006	Brigitte Engerer	Mirare	No	
2006	David Fray	ATMA Classique	No	
2010	Marina Kolomiitseva	Australian Broadcasting Corporation	Yes	
2010	Konstantin Lifschitz	Bijin Classical	No	
2011	Hideyo Harada	Audite	No	
2011	Eldar Nebolsin	Naxos	No	
2012	Matthias Kirschnereit	Berlin Classics	No	
2012	Paul Lewis	Harmonia Mundi	No	
2014	George-Emmanuel Lazaridis	SOMM	No	
2014	Garrick Ohlsson	Dux Records	No	
2014	Aaron Pilsan	Naïve	No	
2015	Philipp Kopachevsky	Piano Classics	No	
2015	Olga Scheps	Sony Music Entertainment	No	
2017	Naruhiko Kawaguchi	Outhere	No	
2020	Seong-Jin Cho	Deutsche Grammophon	No	
2022	Mathieu Gaudet	Analekta	No	
2024	Alexandre Kantorow	BIS Records	No	
2025	Ammiel Bushakevitz	Hänssler	No	

Transcriptions by Liszt and others
Year	Pianist	Orchestra	Conductor	Label	Transcriber	Uninterrupted?	Live recording
1958	Alfred Brendel	Vienna Volksoper Orchestra	Michael Gielen	Turnabout Records	Franz Liszt	Yes	
1980	Michel Béroff	Leipzig Gewandhaus Orchestra	Kurt Masur	Warner Classics	Franz Liszt	Yes	
1993	Joshua Pierce	Moscow State Philharmonic Orchestra	Paul Freeman	MSR Classics	Franz Liszt	Yes	
1995	Victor Sangiorgio	Queensland Symphony Orchestra	En Shao	Australian Broadcasting Corporation	Franz Liszt	Yes	
1998	Boris Berezovsky	New York Philharmonic	Kurt Masur	Teldec	Franz Liszt	Yes	X
1998	Leslie Howard	Budapest Symphony Orchestra	Karl Anton Rickenbacher	Hyperion	Franz Liszt	No	
2000	Louis Lortie	Hague Residentie Orchestra	George Pehlivanian	Chandos	Franz Liszt	No	
2007	Joseph James	English Chamber Orchestra, The Schubert Ensemble	Orlando Jopling	Signum Classics	Joseph James	No	
2009	Peter Frankl	Budapest Philharmonic Orchestra	Rico Saccani	Rico Saccani	Franz Liszt	No	
2011	Jenő Jandó	Budapest Symphony Orchestra	András Ligeti	Capriccio	Franz Liszt	Yes	
2023	Giovanni Doria Miglietta			Piano Classics	Franz Liszt	No	
2024	Tomer Lev and Berenika Glixman - MultiPiano Ensemble	Berlin Radio Symphony Orchestra	Ivor Bolton	Hyperion	Franz Liszt	No	
