= Frankston Symphony Orchestra =

Frankston Symphony Orchestra (FSO) is one of ten community orchestras in Victoria, Australia. It is from the Melbourne suburb of Frankston on the Mornington Peninsula. The orchestra forms a part of the Frankston Music Society, which also includes the Mornington Peninsula Chorale.

== History ==
Frankston Music Society was founded in 1967 by the world-renowned pianist Vera Bradford and fellow residents from the area. The Orchestra was formed first in 1968, with the chorale following in 1979.

Bradford raised the profile of the orchestra dramatically during its early years. She performed with the orchestra; she also organized notable soloists to perform with it, including Ron Farren-Price and Geoffrey Tozer. The orchestra had a number of notable past conductors, including Eric Austin-Phillips, George Logie-Smith OBE, Yoshinao Osawa, Joannes Roose, and Mark Shiell.

== Today ==
The orchestra performs regularly at the Frankston Arts Centre and also tours regional Victoria. Apart from traditional concerts, the orchestra also performs concerts of children's music, film and television scores, and contemporary pieces.
