= Roy Shepherd (pianist) =

Australian pianist

Roy Shepherd MBE (1907 – 20 June 1986) was an Australian pianist who is most renowned as a piano teacher at the University of Melbourne Conservatorium.

Walter Roy Shepherd was born in Geelong in 1907. His early interest was in medicine, but he had an exceptional soprano voice and showed great pianistic talent, so he acceded to his mother's wishes and studied music. He joined the choir of St Paul's Cathedral, Melbourne, where the director, Dr. A. E. Floyd mentored him and encouraged him to continue his studies overseas.

In 1925 he won the (Sir William) Clarke Scholarship to study at the Royal College of Music in London (other Clarke Scholars included Sir Bernard Heinze and Sir William McKie). He remained in London for four years, then had two years of study under Alfred Cortot and Blanche Bascourret de Gueraldi at the École Normale de Musique de Paris. He mingled with the expatriate Australian musical community in Paris, including often performing at Dame Nellie Melba's soirees. After his father's death in 1934, he returned to Australia to perform and teach at the University of Melbourne Conservatorium, later becoming Reader of Music.

In 1936 Shepherd was appointed Director of Music at Geelong College. His tenure was cut short by illness, and this presented the opportunity for George Logie-Smith, at that time a 22-year-old who had no academic qualifications or teacher training, to be appointed Director in Shepherd's place in 1937, on Shepherd's strong recommendation.

In 1951 he was invited back to the École Normale in Paris to teach advanced students, being probably the first Australian pianist to be so honoured.

His students at the University of Melbourne Conservatorium included: George Logie-Smith, Bruce Hungerford, Keith Humble, Ian Munro, Helen Gifford, Alan Kogosowski, James Helme Sutcliffe, Warren Thomson, Lawrence Whiffin, Nehama Patkin, Antony Gray, Tony Fenelon, Michael Bertram, Victor Sangiorgio and others.

In 1963 he was required to retire from the university, but was immediately hired by the Victorian College of the Arts. He also worked at Scotch College.

Roy Shepherd edited Debussy's Preludes, Liszt's Consolations and some other scores.

== Personal life ==
In 1952 in Paris he met the French soprano Denise Schubenel (8 December 1927–30 May 2014), whom he married in Melbourne on 20 June 1954. They had two sons and four grandchildren. Denise Shepherd went on to become a renowned French language coach who worked for many years with the Victorian State Opera and Opera Australia.

In the New Year's Honours of 1978 Roy Shepherd was appointed a Member of the Order of the British Empire (MBE).

In later life he suffered from a painful neurological condition of the legs, and was effectively house-bound from the early 1980s. He died on his wedding anniversary, 20 June 1986, after returning home from an anniversary dinner with his wife.
