= Victor Sangiorgio =

Australian classical pianist

Victor Sangiorgio is an Australian classical pianist. He was born in Italy, grew up and trained in Australia, resides in London and performs internationally.

== Biography ==
Victor Sangiorgio was born in Italy but his family moved to Australia when he was four, and settled in Perth, Western Australia. He completed his initial training at Perth Modern School, as a member of the school's music scholarship programme. Further studies were with Stephen Dornan, Roy Shepherd, Guido Agosti and Noretta Conci.

By the age of nineteen he had been a soloist with all the major Australian orchestras and had recorded and broadcast extensively on radio and television. He was a finalist in the 1978 ABC Instrumental and Vocal competition. He was a finalist in the 1988 Sydney International Piano Competition and won a special prize for the best performance of an Australian composition.

He was the featured soloist on the Australian Youth Orchestra's and West Australian Symphony Orchestra's tours of China, Hong Kong and Singapore.

With Belinda McFarlane, violin, and Matthew Lee, cello, he is a member of the piano trio fiorini.

Victor Sangiorgio has given masterclasses in many cities and has also been artist in residence at the Western Australian Academy of Performing Arts (2003) and Visiting Lecturer in Piano at the Royal Conservatoire of Scotland, the Colchester Institute, and the Royal Birmingham Conservatoire.

With the actor Andrew Sachs, he has toured with a two-man show called "Life after Fawlty", which included Richard Strauss's voice and piano setting of Alfred, Lord Tennyson's poem "Enoch Arden".

In March 2008, with the General Manager of the Perth Concert Hall, he travelled to the Steinway factory in Hamburg to select a new Concert D Model Steinway piano for the Concert Hall.

== Discography (not complete) ==
- Stanley Bate: Piano Concerto No. 2 in C, Op. 28; Franz Reizenstein: Piano Concerto No. 2 in F
- Walter Braunfels: Piano concerto, Op. 21 (with BBC Concert Orchestra conducted by Johannes Wildner)
- John Carmichael: works including Piano Quartet Sea Changes
- Domenico Cimarosa: 2 volumes of sonatas
- d'Erlanger: Concerto symphonique for piano and orchestra (with BBC Concert Orchestra conducted by Johannes Wildner)
- Benjamin Godard: Piano Concerto No. 1 in A minor, Op. 31; Introduction et Allegro for piano and orchestra, Op. 49: Royal Scottish National Orchestra, Martin Yates (world premiere recordings)
- Franz Liszt: Transcriptions for piano and orchestra of Beethoven (Fantasy on motifs from The Ruins of Athens, S. 122), Berlioz (Grand symphonic fantasy on themes from Lélio, S. 120), Schubert (Wanderer Fantasy, S. 366) and Weber (Polonaise brillante, S. 367): Queensland Symphony Orchestra, En Shao
- Igor Stravinsky: Complete works for piano solo
- Concertos by Sergei Rachmaninoff (no. 1 in F sharp minor) and Felix Mendelssohn (no. 2 in D minor)
