= Frank Hyett =

Australian cricketer and politician (1882–1919)

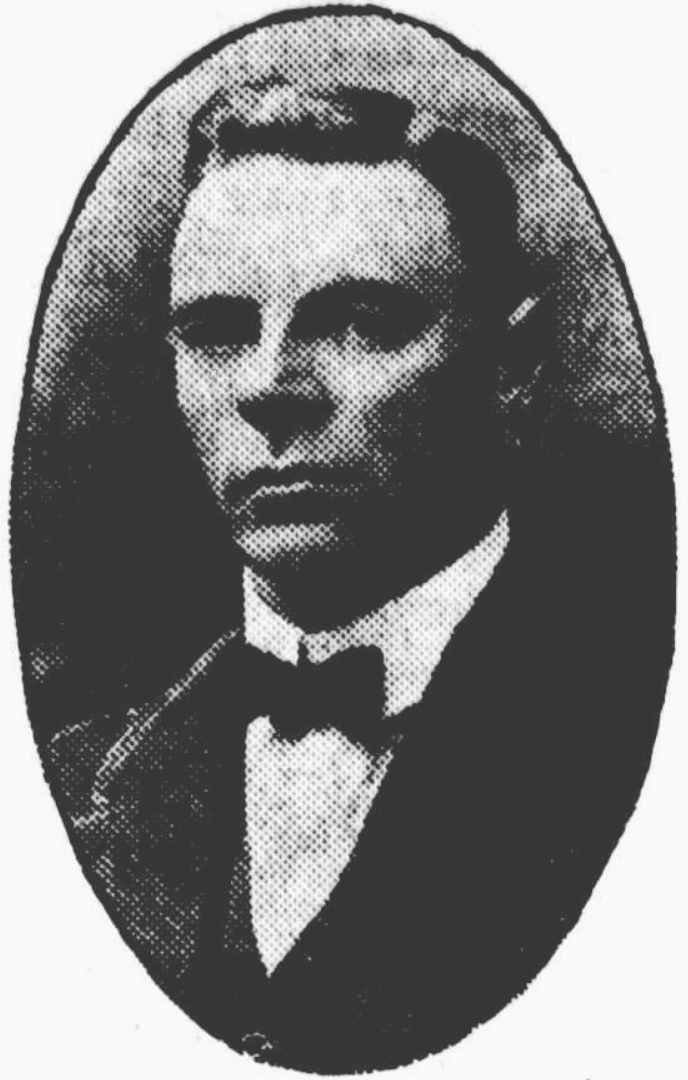
Frank Hyett, 1915.

Francis William "Frank" Hyett (9 February 1882 – 25 April 1919) was an Australian politician, trade unionist, first-class cricketer and anti-conscription activist.

== Biography ==
He was born near Ballarat, Victoria, the elder child and only son of William Hyett, a sawmill laborer from Tasmania, and his wife Annie. His father died from pneumonia on 1 March 1883. At the age of 13, he left school and began working at a grocery store, where he eventually became a clerk.

Hyett embraced socialism in 1902, joining the Australian Social Democratic Party, and becoming its Secretary in 1905. Among the formative friendships he built at that time, the future Prime Minister John Curtin, Frank Anstey and Tom Mann were the most prominent. In 1906, he followed Mann after the latter founded the Victorian Socialist Party, and became that organization's deputy secretary.

In February 1910, he took a role of a paid organizer at the Amalgamated Society of Railway Employees, and became its general secretary in July. An advocate of stronger industrial unions, he founded the Victorian Railways Union one year later and headed it as its secretary general. In this position, he was instrumental in the creation of a single unified union for all Australian Railways; his efforts eventually led to the foundation of the Australian Railways Union in 1920, after his death.

During the first World War, Hyett was a strong opponent to conscription, and from 1916 to 1918, the Victorian Railways Union's paper was one of the more visible platforms used by the anti-conscription movement.

He died from pneumonia on 25 April 1919 after contracting the Spanish flu, at 37 years of age. He is buried in the Box Hill Cemetery. John Curtin was said to have been particularly affected by Hyett's death, his wife recounting that he "paced the verandah" of their home all night long, "repeating in disbelief, 'Frank Hyett is dead.' "

Hyett was married on 19 May 1910 to Ethel Margaret Gunn at a VSP wedding and left two daughters and a son.

== See also ==
- List of Victoria first-class cricketers

== Sources ==
- G. C. Hewitt, A History of the Victorian Socialist Party, 1906-1932 (M.A. thesis, La Trobe University, 1974)
- A. Scarlett, Frank Hyett, a Political Biography (B.A. Hons thesis, La Trobe University, 1979).
- A. Scarlett, Hyett, Francis William, Australian Dictionary of Biography (ADB), vol. 9, pp. 422–423; Melbourne University Press, 1983
