= Vera Bradford =

Australian classical pianist and teacher

- Born: 5 September 1904; Melbourne, Australia
- Died: 6 January 2004 (aged 99); Camberwell, Australia
- Genres: Classical
- Occupation: Pianist
- Instrument: Piano

Vera Florence Bradford (5 September 1904 – 6 January 2004) was an Australian classical pianist and teacher, with a very long career. Her playing was admired for its depth and beauty of tone, classical unity and tremendous power.

Vera Bradford was born in Melbourne to a musical family. Her mother Edith was a pianist, and her father Frederick and brother Cec were violinists. She started learning the piano at the age of seven, and she graduated from the University of Melbourne Conservatorium in 1927, with the highest honours. In 1928 she took up a scholarship with Percy Grainger in Chicago. (Grainger and his wife Ella became close friends of Vera’s, and Ella always stayed with Vera on Percy's visits to Australia.) She also studied at the Chicago Musical College with Rudolph Ganz and Alexander Raab. It was Raab who introduced her to the technique that made her famous, the 'arm weight' technique of the Russian teacher Theodor Leschetizky, which she had first experienced when seeing Benno Moiseiwitsch perform in Melbourne in the 1920s. It was this which developed the big tone and control that became a feature of her performances of the works of Brahms, Rachmaninoff and Liszt. Raab insisted she not play the piano for a year, so that she could unlearn her previous techniques, and practise with the piano lid down.

Her debut was in 1931 at the Chicago Opera House where she played the Hungarian Gypsy Airs by Sophie Menter, orchestrated by Tchaikovsky. This was followed by a long and triumphant career as a concert pianist in which she gave many first Australian performances – George Gershwin's Concerto in F, Richard Strauss's Burleske in D minor (1937), the Sophie Menter piece mentioned above, Debussy's Feux d'artifices, and works by Bartók and William Walton. She played extensively in Australia and with the fledgling Australian Broadcasting Commission (ABC) orchestras before World War II, and after the war undertook a number of overseas tours. In 1946 she was the first Australian woman to perform the Brahms concertos, which the ABC and Bernard Heinze had previously considered too difficult for a woman. The critic Neville Cardus wrote of a performance of the D minor concerto with the Sydney Symphony Orchestra: "Miss Bradford put forth a strength which many men might envy or fear. It was virtuoso playing of a rare order".

The same attitude had prevailed when she was contracted to premiere Richard Strauss's Burleske with the Melbourne Symphony Orchestra in 1937. The visiting Finnish conductor Georg Schnéevoigt discovered the pianist was a woman and demanded she be replaced by a male pianist; but Vera Bradford was not one to be intimidated, and she gave an excellent performance.

For many years she was a teacher at Melbourne University. In 1963 she represented Australia at the 2nd International Music Festival in Seoul, Korea and visited Japan, the Philippines, and Hong Kong. For some time in the 1960s she taught students in a private home in Frankston and was loved by her pupils. She continued to be active in music well into the 1970s, being the first pianist to perform a recital for Melbourne television However, for a time during this period, she was excluded from any ABC engagements, due to difficulties she had with the General Manager, Sir Charles Moses, and her recordings were banned. However, in 2010, following a listener request to ABC FM broadcaster Colin Fox (Weekend Breakfast) ABC Radio recording were found from the archives and broadcast. In 1968 she formed the Frankston Music Society and the Frankston Symphony Orchestra, and performed with it on a number of occasions. She also arranged for young pianists such as Geoffrey Tozer and Ronald Farren-Price to appear with the orchestra.

Vera Bradford never married, preferring to focus her energies on her musical career.

She died on 6 January 2004, eight months short of her 100th birthday, at Tanderra Hostel in Camberwell, Melbourne. She often gave impromptu concerts there for her fellow guests, the last time being just two months before her death.

The Frankston campus of Monash University houses a large collection of Vera Bradford's items that she donated; it is known as the Vera Bradford Music Collection.

== Sources ==
- Australian Women’s History Forum
- Monash University: Vera Bradford Music Collection
- Frankston Music Society
- Obituary 'Concert pianist studied with Grainger', The Age, 31 January 2004, p. 23
