= 1982 Queen's Birthday Honours (Australia) =

Awards list for Australia

The 1982 Queen's Birthday Honours for Australia were appointments to recognise and reward good works by citizens of Australia and other nations that contribute to Australia. The Birthday Honours are awarded as part of the Queen's Official Birthday celebrations and were announced on 13 June 1982 in Australia.

The recipients of honours are displayed as they were styled before their new honour and arranged by honour with grades and then divisions i.e. Civil, Diplomatic and Military as appropriate.

== Order of Australia ==
=== Knight of the Order of Australia (AK) ===
==== General Division ====
Recipient	Citation	Notes
The Honourable Sir Charles Walter Michael Court, KCMG OBE	For service to politics and local government	

=== Companion (AC) ===
==== General Division ====
Recipient	Citation	Notes
Professor Robert John Walsh, AO OBE	For service to medicine	

=== Officer (AO) ===
==== General Division ====
Recipient	Citation	Notes
John Gosman Allwright	For service to primary industry	
Richard Austen	For service to the coal industry	
Dr Robert Francis Brissenden	For service to literature	
Dr Joan Helen Bryan	For service to medical research	
Emeritus Professor Gilbert James Butland	For service to education	
Evonne Fay Cawley, MBE	For services to the sport of tennis	
John Edmund Duggan	For service to parliamentary and local government services	
The Honourable Justice Elizabeth Andreas Evatt	For service to law	
Frank Randall Harris	For public service	
Lloyd James Hartigan	For service to industry	
Frank Colin Hassell	For service to architecture	
Associate Professor Donald Richmond Horne	For service to literature	
John Barry Humphries	For service to the theatre	
The Honourable Justice Samuel Joshua Jacobs	For service to the community	
Henry Frederick Jensen	For parliamentary and local government service	
Raymond John Kirby	For service to industry	
Dr Kenneth David Muirden	For service to medicine	
The Reverend Arthur William Preston, OBE	For service to the community	
Phillip Lovett Ridings	For service to the sport of cricket	
Captain Robert James Ritchie, CBE	For public and community service	
Henry Edwin Rossitor	For public service	
Professor Alan George Lewers Shaw	For service to education	
Roy McCowan Simpson	For service to architecture	
Professor Ralph Owen Slatyer	For service to science	
Kenneth Wilberforce Tribe, AM	For service to the arts, particularly in the field of music	
Carlo Valmorbida	For service to ethnic welfare	
John Sampson White, CMG	For public service	
David George Druce Yencken	For service to conservation and history	

==== Military Division ====
Branch	Recipient	Citation	Notes
Navy	Rear Admiral Rothesay Cathcart Swan, CBE	For service as Director General of the Natural Disasters Organisation and as Controller of Establishments in the Department of Defence	
Air Force	Air Vice Marshal James Hilary Flemming, AM	For service to the Royal Australian Air Force	

=== Member (AM) ===
==== General Division ====
Recipient	Citation	Notes
Brother Oswald Stanislaus Adams	For service to education	
Reverend Ronald William Allardice	For service to religion	
Alan Jack Antonio	For service to local government	
Bert Frederick George Apps	For service to the community	
Professor John Bloomfield	For service to sports medicine	
William Henri Bowen	For service to the community	
Raymond Burkitt	For service to the community and industry	
Eugene Allan Norbert Byrne	For service to the sport of Rugby Union	
Mervyn James Callaghan	For service to the community and trade unionism	
John William Callow	For service to medicine	
Kenneth Livingstone Carr	For service to the community and the welfare of youths	
The Reverend Canon Ivor Frederick Church	For service to religion	
Audrey William Conn	For service to the public	
Professor John Douglas Correll Crisp	For service to engineering	
Charles Philip Cullen	For service to education	
James Bartholomew Cummings	For service to the sport of horse racing	
Alderman Ronald Edward Davis	For service to the community and local government	
John Edward Delaney	For service as a hospital administrator	
Colin Boyd Dunlop	For service to the community	
Keith Stacey Edmunds	For service to the public	
Samuel Fisher	For service to the community	
Dr The Honourable Derek David Freeman	For service to dentistry	
Maurice Desmond Frost	For public service	
Neil William Hunt Furness	For service to commerce and education	
Ronald Malcolm Gibbs	For service to education	
James Wallace Goulter	For service to the community	
Commander James Stewart Guest, OBE	For service to medicine	
Professor Leslie Keith Humble	For service to music	
William George Solomon Huxley	For services to conservation	
Dr Roger John Ingham	For service to education	
Dr Owen Francis James	For service to medicine	
George Joseph	For service to local government and to the community	
William Herbert Kenworthy	For service to local government and to the community	
Darani Lewers	For service to craft and the manual arts	
Dr Kathleen Rachel Makinson	For public service	
The Honourable Peter McMahon	For service to trade unionism and community	
John West McMaster	For service to surf life saving	
Brigadier Ernest George McNamara, OBE ED RL	For public service	
Diana d'Este Medlin	For service to education	
William Waldron Goss Meecham	For service to commerce and industry	
Bernard Grant Mitchell	For service to education	
Ernest Edward Morris	For service to the building industry	
The Right Reverend Cecil Emerson Barron Muschamp	For service to the community and to religion	
John William O'Neill	For service to agriculture	
Thomas James Perrott	For service to the community	
Thomas Mansergh Pickering	For service to jazz music and to librarianship	
Harold Edward Porter	For service to literature	
Dr Corrie Reye	For service to medicine	
Frederick John Roberts	For public service	
Lincoln Gordon Rowe	For service to industry and commerce	
Major Madge Rush	For service to the community	
Harry Stickland	For service to local government	
Gladys Evelyn Tanner	For service to nursing	
Arthur Grahame Taylor	For service to the community	
Dr Marjorie Ruth Walker	For service to medicine	
Peter Lindsay Weir	For service to the film industry	
Frank Wickham	For public service	

==== Military Division ====
Branch	Recipient	Citation	Notes
Navy	Captain Geoffrey James Alexander Bayliss		
Navy	Captain Daryl Robin Osmond Shaw Fox	For service to the Royal Australian Navy	
Navy	Commander Brian Lee Spark	For service to the Royal Australian Navy	
Army	Lieutenant Colonel Rodney Gerard Curtis, MC	For service to the SAS Regiment	
Army	Colonel John Talbot Dunn, MBE	For services to the Australian Army in the field of medicine	
Army	Colonel John Garth Hughes	For service to the Australian Army	
Army	Lieutenant Colonel Richard Bentley Knight	For service to the Australian Army	
Army	Lieutenant Colonel Peter Donald Knight	For service to the Australian Army	
Army	Lieutenant Colonel James Baildon Potter, ED	For service to the Army Reserve	
Air Force	Wing Commander John Herbert Dunn	For service to the Royal Australian Air Force, particularly as Commanding Officer of Number 5 Squadron	
Air Force	Wing Commander James Keith Gray Moore	For service to the Department of Defence (Air Force Officer)	
Air Force	Wing Commander Brian O'Connell	For service to the Royal Australian Air Force	
Air Force	Wing Commander Harold Ernst Adam Pfeffer	For service to the Royal Australian Air Force	

=== Medal (OAM) ===
==== General Division ====
Recipient	Citation	Notes
Claire Patricia Airey	For service to the community and nursing	
Roger Quilter Allen	For service to disabled children	
Raphael Apuatimi	For service to the Aboriginal art culture and arts	
Cuthbert Milne Ayling	For service to the community	
Agnes Cecilia Bailey	For service to the community	
Ronald Keith Baker	For service to the community and local government	
Royston William Baldwin	For service to sport in the fields of cricket and Australian Rules football	
Irene Mary Therese Barry	For service to the community and music	
Edith Emma Beasley	For service to disabled children	
Harry John Beauchamp	For service to the community	
Dawn Bennett	For service to the disabled	
Charles Findlay Bentley	For service to adult education	
William Frank Bird	For service to Aboriginal welfare	
Bernard Abraham Boas	For service to the community	
Douglas Gordon Bowd	For service to the community	
Marie Antoinette Boyers	For service to education in the field of speech and drama	
Sister Mary Alexius Boyle	For service to education	
Alexander William Boyne	For service to the community	
Emily Susan Brimfield	For service to the welfare of ex-service personnel	
Susanne Janet Douglas Broad	For service to the community	
Harold John Brown	For service to life saving	
Janet Mary Browning	For service to the community	
Helen Ruth Burmester	For service to the community	
James Henry Butler	For service to the community and local government	
Eric Charles Butler	For service to the welfare of ex-service personnel	
Geoffrey Harold Cambridge	For service to commerce	
John Emile Ferdinand Cannot	For service to the community and to surf life saving	
Albert John Carlisle	For service to the community	
John William Chamberlain	For services to the Public Service	
John Parker Bua Chapman	For service to the timber industry	
Royl Francis Chardon	For service to the welfare of ex-service personnel and to the community	
Robert Donald Christsen	For public service and service to the community	
Sydney Ernest Churchill	For service to the fruit and vegetable industry	
Frank John Clark	For service to the community	
David Michael Cockburn	For service to optometry	
Muriel Frances Cohen	For service to music	
Arthur Edward Cole	For service to the community	
Arthur James Collins	For service to band music	
Peter Gordon Cooper	For service to the sport of badminton	
Basil Creedy	For service to the community and local government	
Malcolm Carlyle Crosbie	For service to the community	
Brian Cross	For service to youth welfare	
Eileen Daniel	For service to the sport of softball	
Lionel Ray Daniel	For service to the community and local government	
Inspector Robert William Davis	For service to the public	
Eva Edna Dennis	For service to the disabled	
Muriel Alice Dickinson	For service to the community	
John Bernard Dillon	For service to the community and trade unionism	
Robert Arthur Donald	For service to the welfare of ex-service personnel	
Colin George Duke	For service to the community and to local government	
Clive Watson Elliott	For service to education	
Elsie Agnes Erwen	For service to the community	
Louis Nicholas Fleyfel	For service to ethnic welfare	
Douglas James Fullston	For service to local government and to the community	
Ivan Thomas James Gates	For service to the community	
George Geddes	For service to the community	
Albert William James Giddings	For service to the community	
Ernest William (Joseph) Glascott	For service to journalism	
Kevin Francis Gould	For service to the community	
Herman Gutman	For service to the community	
Councillor Robert George Halliday	For service to local government and community	
Guy Ronald Hamlyn-Harris	For service to the community	
Bernhard Hammerman	For service to ethnic welfare	
Lieutenant Commander John George Hampson	For service to youth welfare	
John Joseph Hanley	For service to the cattle industry	
Evelyn Pauline Harding (Queenie Paul)	For service to the theatre	
George Walter Harman	For service to local government and community	
Ronald Francis Harrison	For service to the community	
Hilda Florence Heinrich	For service to the community	
William Hickey	For service to the welfare of ex-service personnel	
The Reverend Monsignor Barry James Hickey	For service to the community	
Senior Sergeant Colin Robert Hodder, QPM	For public service	
Ralph Frederick Holden	For service to the community	
Eleanor Phoebe Holmes	For service to the community	
Edward William Robert Howard	For service to the community	
Ruth Hilda Harrison Hurn	For service to nursing	
Albert Charles Jackson	For service to local government	
Edward John (Ted) Jackson	For service to the community	
Clarence Roy James	For service as hospital administrator	
Francis Edwin Johnson	For service to the sport of Rugby League Football	
Neville Raymond Johnson	For service to the sport of squash	
George Johnstone	For service to the sport of horse racing	
Muriel Valerie Ryan (Mrs Johnstone-Need)	For service to medicine	
Lorna Marjorie Jolly	For service to the sport of women's hockey	
David Penry Jones	For service to the community	
Richard Oscar Jones	For service to the community	
Eileen Margaret Kane	For service to ballroom dancing	
Milan Karamarko	For service to the Croatian community	
Henry O'Connor Kennedy	For service to local government and community	
Marie Helene Kentwell	For service to child welfare	
Elizabeth Caroline Killinger	For service to the community and religion	
William Geoffrey Kinsman	For service to the community	
Michael Kiprioti	For public service	
Frederick John Kittle	For service to the community	
Barbara Alison Knezevic	For public service	
Assistant Commissioner Richard Carlile Knight	For public service	
Djoli Laiwonga	For service to Aboriginal culture and arts	
Raymond Stanley Lambert	For service to the community	
Joseph Arthur Langton	For service to the community	
Harold Francis Lashwood	For service to the entertainment industry	
Brian Layland	For service to optometry	
Kenneth James Leal	For service to the printing industry	
Enid Bosworth Lorimer	For service to the performing arts	
Mary Vera Loveday	For service to the community	
James William Mackey	For service to the community	
Liyapidiny Marika	For service in the field of Aboriginal health and welfare	
Patricia June Martin	For service to youth welfare	
Frederick Percy McCallum	For service to the sport of Australian rules football	
Phyllis Emily McDonald	For service to the community	
Betty Jean McDonald	For service to the community	
Rawdon Townshend McDouall	For service to local government and community	
Ian Stuart McKenzie	For service to the community	
William Harold Mitchell	For public service	
Domenico Morizzi	For service to ethnic welfare	
Mabel Joyce Mossemenear	For service to the disabled	
Henry Eric Mullen	For public and community welfare	
Kenneth Claude Murchison	For service to equestrian sport and community	
Robert Frank Neander	For service to the welfare of members of the Defence Force	
Colin Odgers	For service to the community	
Madge Blackmore (Lesley) Oldershaw	For service to the community	
Olive Nell Oxlee	For public service	
Peter Pan Quee	For public service	
Norma McNeel Paterson	For service to the community and music	
Lawrence Alfred Payne	For service to local government and community	
Albert Edward Pearce	For service to the community	
Barry Thomas Pengelly	For service to the community	
George Harnett Phillips	For service to the community	
Agostino Domenico Pietracatella	For service to the community	
Nicholas Polites	For service to ethnic welfare	
Clarence Donald Pretty	For service to the community	
William John Puregger	For service to the community	
Alexander Daniel Rice	For service to the community	
Thomas Alexander Roberts	For service to equestrian sport	
John James Robertson	For public service	
Bruce Arnold Robson	For service to the community	
Karel Rodny	For service to the sport of soccer	
Thelma May Rowatt	For public and community service	
John Patrick Savage	For service to trade unionism	
Otto Rex Schroeter	For service to sport in the fields of bowls and Australian rules football	
Wladyslaw Kazimierz Sikorski	For public service	
Sergeant John Smith	For community service	
Cyril Thomas Stafford	For service to the community	
Leonard John Stone	For service to the sport of cricket	
Kevin John Sullivan	For service to the community	
Kenneth John Summerhill	For service to the community, particularly with pony clubs	
Dr Jack Sunderman	For service to medicine	
James William Fletcher Sweet	For service to the sport of rifle shooting	
John Kenneth Thistlethwaite	For service to education	
Albert Leslie Thomas	For public service	
James Andrew Thompson	For service to the sport of gymnastics	
Dorothy May Thorne	For service to Aboriginal welfare	
Roy Leo Patrick Turner	For service to the sport of cricket	
Reverend Johannes Frederick Hermanus Vanderbom	For service to religion and community	
Dr Demetrios George Varvaressos	For service to ethnic welfare	
Wilfred Douglas Verco	For service to the community	
Pearl Voller	For service to the community	
Margaret Evelyn Walker	For service to the performing arts	
Herbert Edgar Ward	For service to the sport of cricket	
Edward Charles Wesley	For service to education	
Leslie Sydney Wickham	For service to the community	
Laurel Jean Willis	For service to the community	
Margaret Hannah Wilson	For service to the community	
David Worobin	For service to music	
Edward Athelstan Wrightson	For service to the community	
Victor George Yaxley	For service to local government	
Zuzanna Zarebska	For service to ethnic welfare	

==== Military Division ====
Branch	Recipient	Citation	Notes
Navy	Warrant Officer Robert Theodore Caplice	For service to the Royal Australian Navy	
Navy	Warrant Officer Peter Andrew Lewis Eley	For service to the Royal Australian Navy	
Navy	Warrant Officer Gordon Lawrence Miller	For service to the Royal Australian Navy	
Navy	Warrant Officer Colin Trevor Rowley	For service to the Royal Australian Navy	
Army	Warrant Officer Class Two Grahame Donald Anderson	For service to the Australian Army	
Army	Warrant Officer Class One Reginald Martin Hind	For service to the Army Reserve	
Army	Warrant Officer Class Two Brian Kent London, DCM	For service to the Australian Army	
Army	Warrant Officer Class One George Robert Townsend	For service to the Royal Australian Engineers	
Army	Warrant Officer Class One Kevin Stanley Wendt, BEM	For service as Regimental Sergeant Major of the 8th/9th Battalion, Royal Australian Regiment	
Army	Warrant Officer Class Two Trevor John Williamson	For service to the Australian Army	
Air Force	Warrant Officer Barry Redshaw	For service to the Royal Australian Air Force	

== Knight Bachelor ==
- George Kneipp — For service to education and to the community.
