= Helen Gifford =

Australian composer

Helen Gifford OAM
- Birth name: Helen Margaret Gifford
- Born: 5 September 1935; Hawthorn, Melbourne, Australia
- Occupation: Composer

Helen Margaret Gifford OAM (born 5 September 1935) is an Australian composer. On Australia Day (26 January) 1996 she was appointed to the Medal of the Order of Australia, "in recognition of service to music as a composer". At the APRA Music Awards of 2016 she won the category "Distinguished Services to Australian Music".

== Biography ==
Helen Gifford was born in Melbourne, Australia, of Scots and Cornish heritage. Gifford attended Tintern Junior School and Melbourne Girls Grammar, and then the University of Melbourne Conservatorium on a Commonwealth Scholarship. She studied with Roy Shepherd and Dorian Le Gallienne, graduating with a Bachelor of Music in 1958. She won the Dorian Le Gallienne Award in 1965, a Senior Composer's Fellowship in 1973, and served as composer-in-residence with the Australian Opera beginning in 1974. In the 1960s and early '70s, her music showed the influence of travel to India and Indonesia. At the Australia Day Honours in 1996 she was appointed to the Medal of the Order of Australia, with a citation, "In recognition of service to music as a composer." At the APRA Music Awards of 2016 she won the Art Music Award category, Distinguished Services to Australian Music.

Helen Gifford is a represented artist of the Australian Music Centre.

== Compositions ==
Gifford was commissioned by the ELISION Ensemble to compose Music for the Adonia in 1993. It was written for soprano Deborah Kayser, with the ELISION Ensemble to accompany her on piccolo/flute, clarinet, percussion, harp, mandolin, 10-string guitar, viola and cello. It was inspired by the annual women's festival, Adonia, held in Athens in ancient Greek times.

She composed As Foretold to Khayyam, for pianist Michael Kieran Harvey in 1999 on commission from ABC Classic FM. The same year she wrote a 50-minute work for choir and instruments, Choral Scenes: The Western Front, World War I. Commissioned by Astra, it was a setting of English, French and German verse of that time. She also wrote the work Catharsis (2002) for the Astra choir. It includes verse by Anna Akhmatova, Kathleen Raine and Elizabeth Riddell. In Spell Against Sorrow (2003), for soprano and guitar, written for Deborah Kayser and Geoffrey Morris, Gifford used text from three poems of Kathleen Raine. Menin Gate (2005) was written for Michael Kieran Harvey and won APRA/AMC Classical Music State Award for Victoria 2006.

In 2014, Gifford composed Desperation for violist Phoebe Green. This work was premiered at a concert presented by Astra - Helen Gifford at 80.

In 2015, Gifford composed Undertones of War inspired by Edmund Blunden's book Undertones of War. The work was premiered by pianist Michael Kieran Harvey and commissioned by Melbourne Composers' League.

== Works ==
Gifford composes for stage, orchestra, chamber ensemble and solo instruments, often incorporating elements of Balinese and Javanese music. Selected works include:

- Carol: As dew in Aprille (1955) for voice and piano
- Fantasy (1958) for flute and piano
- Piano sonata (1960) for solo piano
- Skiagram (1963) for flute, viola and vibraphone
- Phantasma (1963) for string orchestra
- Red autumn in Valvins (1964) for soprano or mezzo-soprano and piano (text: Christopher Brennan)
- Chimaera (1967) for orchestra
- Fable (1967) for harp
- Imperium (1969) for orchestra
- Sonnet (1969) for guitar, flute and harpsichord
- Of old Angkor (1970) for French horn and marimba
- Regarding Faustus (1983)
- Iphigenia in Exile (1985)
- Toccata Attacco (1990) for piano solo
- Music for the Adonia (1993) for chamber ensemble
- Plaint for lost worlds (1994) for flute, clarinet and piano
- Point of Ignition (1995) for mezzo-soprano and orchestra (text: Jessica Aldridge)
- Choral Scenes: the Western Front, World War I (1999)
- As foretold to Khayyám (1999) for piano solo
- Catharsis (2001) SATB choir with soloists and speaker
- Spell Against Sorrow (2003) for soprano and guitar
- Menin Gate (2005) for piano solo
- In Focus (2005): seven pieces for solo piano
- The Tears of Things (2010) for speaker and choir
- Shiva the auspicious one (2012) for piano solo
- Parvati and Celebrations of the Apsaras (2013) for clarinet solo
- Desperation (2015) for viola solo
- Undertones of War (2015) for piano solo
- Ancestress (2018) for viola and piano
