= Robert Walsh (medical scientist) =

Australian medical scientist and geneticist (1917–1983)

Robert Walsh AC
- Born: 3 January 1917; Brisbane, Australia
- Died: 20 July 1983 (aged 66); Westmead, NSW, Australia
- Education: MB, BS with distinction (University of Sydney)
- Occupation: Medical scientist
- Known for: Establishing blood transfusion service
- Medical career
- Institutions: Red Cross Blood Transfusion Service; University of New South Wales

Robert John Walsh AC (3 January 1917 - 20 July 1983) was an Australian medical scientist and geneticist. He set up the New South Wales Red Cross Blood Transfusion Service, serving as its inaugural director for twenty years from 1946 to 1966. From 1973 to 1982, he was the dean of the Faculty of Medicine at the University of New South Wales. His research activities covered a wide range, including iron metabolism, blood groups, genetic influences on diseases, and improving techniques and equipment for collecting, processing, and transporting blood and its products. In 1982 he was awarded Australia's highest civilian honour, Companion of the Order of Australia, for his services to medicine.

== Early life and education ==
Walsh was born on 3 January 1917 in East Brisbane, the second of seven children. His parents were John James Walsh, a barrister, and Catherine Mary Walsh (née Ahern). His father was secretary of the University Congress that formed the University of Queensland, which Robert later attended, and a founding member of that university's Senate in 1911.

He matriculated in 1933 from St Laurence's College. In 1934, he began studying at the University of Queensland, but it did not have a school of medicine so the following year he transferred to the University of Sydney, graduating MB and BS with distinction in 1939. He went on to serve his residency at Sydney Hospital, as a junior in 1940 and a senior in 1941.

== Career ==
=== World War II ===
When World War II broke out in September 1939, Walsh joined the Australian Army Medical Corps as a captain in the Citizen Military Forces. He was diagnosed with hypertension and tuberculosis, which precluded him from serving overseas; instead, he led a domestic army unit which prepared blood serum for use by the military. He also played a crucial role in ensuring a ready supply in case of attacks on Sydney.

=== Red Cross Blood Transfusion Service, 1941-1966 ===
Early in the war, blood transfusions were not common and blood banks did not yet exist; each hospital relied on its own donor list for emergency transfusions. The Red Cross invited Walsh to become their medical officer in February 1941. He created the Blood Transfusion Service (BTS), and ten thousand donors were enlisted in the first three months; Walsh said he was proud that blood donations were voluntary, not paid.

As the BTS changed from civilian to military focus, Walsh left Sydney Hospital and joined the Army. By July 1942, he was commander of the newly created 2nd Australian Blood and Serum Preparation Unit, where he was promoted to major in September 1942. Meanwhile, work was underway to establish the efficacy of blood components, especially plasma and serum. Under Walsh's direction, the unit developed innovative technology for blood transportation, such as identifying different requirements when it was shipped by air or sea. It supplied substantial quantities of serum and plasma to armed forces from Australia, Britain, and America. It collected over 350 blood donations per day in 1942. Investigating why some donors experienced bad reactions was the launch of Walsh's research career. He was also secretary to the Red Cross Blood Transfusion Committee.

The BTS was so effective during the war that it was continued afterwards. When he left the army in 1946, Walsh was appointed as the inaugural director of the BTS, a position which he held until 1966.

In 1947–1948, Walsh took 18 months' study leave from the Red Cross, which was split between Harvard Medical School for a year and Oxford for six months. He studied iron metabolism, particularly its role in red blood cell formation. Additionally, he explored the use of antibodies for blood group identification, leading to population studies on blood group antigens. By 1954, Walsh had secured funding for full-time research fellows and grants for expeditions; the National Health and Medical Research Council and a joint grant from the Nuffield Foundation facilitated studies, including native populations in the New Guinea highlands.

Returning to Australia after his study period, Walsh found there were inadequate research facilities so he established a new research section in 1952. He focused on issues that directly benefited blood donors and recipients; his research into haemoglobin and iron metabolism led him to advocate for supplying iron supplements to aid blood cell production in donors. Data from the BTS provided a unique opportunity to standardize instrument calibration, improving the accuracy of laboratory pathology measurements. He also ran blood group antigen studies, notably among Aboriginal, New Guinean and Pacific Islander groups. He oversaw the development of increasingly sophisticated technology to collect, process, and transport blood and its products. The demand was surging, as they became essential for more complex surgical procedures. Walsh also investigated the hereditary and genetic underpinnings of blood groups, the rhesus factor (Rh) (especially as it pertains to haemolytic disease in babies, where most cases were found to have an Rh-negative mother and Rh-positive father), inheritance of albinism, and the inheritance and pathogenesis of anaemia and haemochromatosis. Furthermore, he identified a previously unknown blood group, which he coined as "S for Sydney"; anti-S reagents in patients' blood are usually a response to pregnancy or transfusion.

=== Academic career 1962-1982 ===
By the early 1960s, the BTS was well established and had international credibility, so Walsh wanted to move on by getting involved in the new school of medicine at the University of New South Wales (UNSW). In 1962, Walsh was appointed UNSW's visiting professor of human genetics, and before long he also chaired the university's Medical Research Advisory Committee.

In 1966, he resigned from the BTS to assume a full-time position as foundation chair and professor of human genetics at the UNSW. In 1969, he joined the University Council, and in 1970, he took on the role of chairman of their Professional Board. From 1973 to 1976 he was head of the School of Community Medicine (which replaced the School of Human Genetics). From 1973 until he retired in 1982, he was the dean of the Faculty of Medicine at UNSW. One of his first responsibilities was to oversee the introduction of a five-year medical degree, to keep pace with international practice. On his retirement, the university made him an emeritus professor.

=== Professional and community service ===
Walsh was instrumental in founding the Haematology Society of Australia and the Australian Society of Blood Transfusion.

He was also engaged in professional organizations and government committees, including many senior positions. He was the president of the Australian Academy of Forensic Sciences (1972–73), the Sydney Hospitallers Association, and the Cystic Fibrosis Association of New South Wales. Additionally, he was chairman of Biological Sciences, Australian Academy of Science (1966–70), the Australian HA (Human Adaptability) Committee, International Biological Programme, and the Research Advisory Committee of Foundation 41. He became Deputy Chairman of the National Blood Transfusion Service Committee in 1972.

Other highlights include serving on the council of the Australian Academy of Science (starting 1963), the Australian Research Grants Committee (1965), the NHMRC Research Advisory Committee (1959), the Medical Research Advisory Committee of New Guinea, and the Queen Elizabeth Fellowships Committee.

== Recognition ==
Walsh was appointed an Officer of the Order of the British Empire (OBE) in 1970, Officer of the Order of Australia (AO) in 1976, and awarded the James Cook Medal of the Royal Society of New South Wales in 1979. In the 1982 Queen's Birthday honours, Walsh was appointed Companion of the Order of Australia (AC) "for service to medicine".

He was recognized as a Fellow of organizations including the Royal Australasian College of Physicians (1955), the Royal College of Pathologists of Australia (1956), and the Australian Academy of Science (1959). He was an honorary life member of the Red Cross Society, the Australian Blood Transfusion Society, the Haematology Society of Australia, the German Haematology Society, the German Society for Blood Transfusion and the Australian Society of Anaesthetists.

== Personal life ==
On 5 June 1944, he married Kathleen Helen Tooth (known as "Helen"), a fellow medical practitioner and former university classmate; they earned their medical degrees (with honours) together and they were medical residents together at Sydney Hospital. Helen became the first female medical superintendent at Sydney Hospital in 1943, and later she pursued a career as a paediatrician. They had four children (three sons and a daughter).

Walsh suffered from hypertension throughout his career, and a severe episode in 1953 resulted in ongoing problems with his vision and kidneys. He died of lymphoma on 20 July 1983.
