= Piano Quartet (Carmichael) =

John Carmichael's Piano Quartet "Sea Changes" was composed in 2000. According to the composer, the title of the work refers to both the waters surrounding Australia, where he was born, and the United Kingdom, where he now resides.

== Structure ==
Composed for a standard piano quartet, the work is in three movements:

1. Allegro energico
2. Lento ma non troppo
3. Allegro

A typical performance takes around 18 to 19 minutes.

== Performance history and recordings ==
The first performance of the quartet was in 2000 in London, where the pianist was Antony Gray and string trio was made up of Belinda MacFarlane, Morgan Goff and Matthew Lee.

On 27 May 2001 the Quartet was performed at the Perth Concert Hall by the Australian Piano Quartet. Later a live recording of this performance, which also featured Brahms' Piano Quartet in G minor, was released by the City of Perth. A commercial release followed in 2004 including other works by Carmichael.
