= Robert Hughes (composer, born 1912) =

Australian composer (1912–2007)

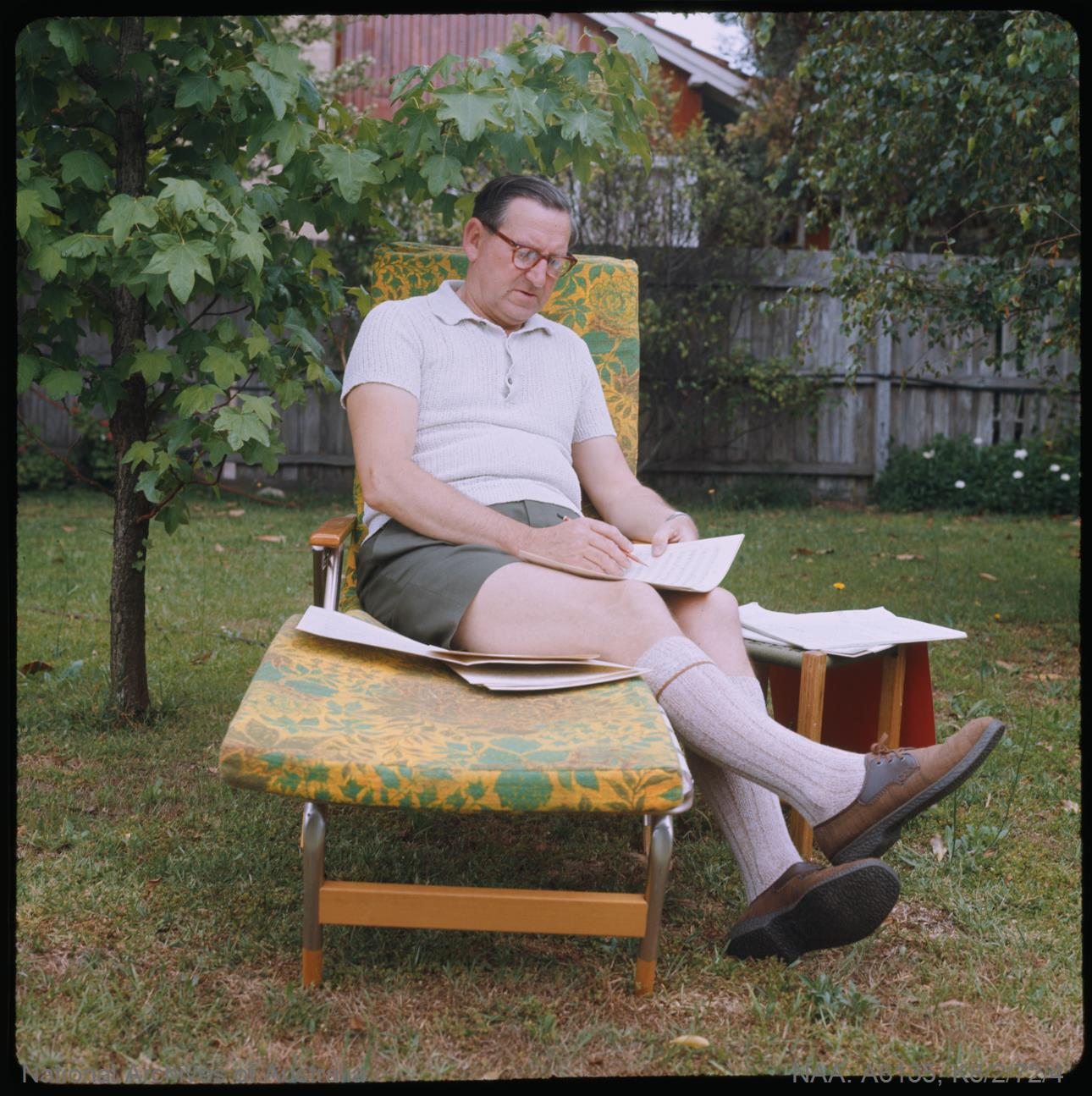
Hughes in 1972

Robert Watson Hughes AO MBE (27 March 1912 – 1 August 2007) was a Scottish-born Australian composer. His melodies are driven by short motives and unrelenting ostinato figures.

Hughes wrote orchestral works, music for ballet and film, some chamber works and an opera that has never been performed. While some of his works are available in published form, there are a number of well-crafted orchestral works that were recorded but never commercially published. Like other composers of his generation, including Dorian Le Gallienne, Raymond Hanson and Margaret Sutherland, Hughes has been considered by musicologists to write in a style reminiscent of the English pastoral school. However, Hughes listened to a wide range of music and surrounded himself with a variety of musical influences which included Debussy, Roussel, Prokofiev, Stravinsky, Sibelius and Bartók.

Hughes was also a champion for other Australian composers, through roles that drew on his administrative skills. His own music has of recent times only infrequently been heard either in the concert hall or on recordings. However, his music was earlier championed by many notable conductors including Sir Bernard Heinze, Sir Eugene Goossens, Willem van Otterloo, John Hopkins – and overseas by Sir John Barbirolli, Sir Malcolm Sargent, Norman Del Mar, Josef Krips, Walter Susskind, and Sir Colin Davis.

== Life and career ==
Robert Watson Hughes was born in Leven, Fife, Scotland, on 27 March 1912. His father Joseph Hughes, a widower and retired fishmonger, emigrated to Melbourne with his children in 1929, when Robert Hughes was 17 years old.

Hughes first became passionate about music through attendance at concerts, opera performances and radio broadcasts as a child. Composition was his primary interest from the start, and while he did receive a little tuition in piano, it was purely for compositional interest. He taught himself to read music, and learned orchestration from books.

After moving to Australia, he worked as a costing clerk in a Melbourne clothing factory to support himself, while attending as many concerts as possible. By 1938 his early compositions had been noticed by the conductor Sir Bernard Heinze, and it was Heinze's interest in his music that allowed Hughes to pursue composing seriously. He also had some lessons from Fritz Hart.

A number of Hughes' orchestral works were performed at public concerts from 1939 but his enlistment in the Australian Imperial Force (AIF) following the outbreak of World War II put an end to his compositional activity for the next few years. He served in New Guinea, Bougainville Island and the Solomon Islands. The tone poem Estivall was premiered during the 1941 concerts of Australian music conducted by Bernard Heinze.

Hughes was demobilised in 1945 and returned to Melbourne. He resumed his job as costing clerk, but subsequently accepted the Australian Broadcasting Corporation's offer of a position as an assistant music librarian and writer. He would remain with the ABC until his retirement in 1976.

In October 1950, to mark the fiftieth anniversary of Federation, the Prime Minister of Australia, Robert Menzies, announced a Jubilee Symphony Competition "open to all natural-born and naturalised British subjects", with a prize of £1000. Composers had until June 1951 to compose a symphony with a maximum duration of 40 minutes. Similar competitions for literature and art were also announced with similar prize money, but unlike the symphony competition, these limited participants to Australian citizens only. There was an additional stipulation in the music competition: "If the winner is not a natural-born or naturalised Australian, a special prize of £250 will be offered for the best entry submitted by an Australian citizen". The judging panel comprised three British musicians: Sir Arnold Bax (then Master of the Queen's Music), Sir John Barbirolli and Eugene Goossens. First prize was awarded to an obscure English composer David Moule-Evans, and the "special" second and third prizes in the competition were awarded to Hughes and Clive Douglas respectively.

The original 1951 shape of the work was in three movements. The ABC recorded this version, which is very effective and powerful, for broadcast purposes. Despite his success in the competition and the early performances of the symphony, Hughes was dissatisfied with both the scherzo (second movement) and the finale. He proceeded to make two extensive revisions of the work in 1953 and 1955 respectively. He also added a slow intermezzo between the scherzo and finale in 1955, but when Norman Del Mar conducted the work in the UK, possibly during the early 1960s, Hughes asked that the slow movement be omitted. Barbirolli invited Hughes to write a Sinfonietta for the 1957 centenary of the Hallé Orchestra in Manchester – the most important international commission offered to an Australian composer during the 1950s. In 1970–71, Hughes revised his symphony yet again. Using his 1955 score as a departure point, he tightened up the first sonata-form movement, lengthened the Intermezzo to become the second, slow movement, restored the trio of his original scherzo and rewrote the ending, and then rewrote much of the finale. Hughes maintained the original idiom of the early 1950s in his work. The work has been described as "the finest symphony composed by an Australian to date. It demonstrates Hughes' mastery of the orchestra; it has strong themes, a fluent and convincing harmonic style, logical, concise form and a tremendous sense of continuity and power. To an uninitiated listener, the work sounds like a conflation of Elgar, Walton, Bax, with interesting melodies derived from unorthodox scalic forms".

He also won the prize for Instrumental Composition in the National Council of Women Jubilee Competition (1952). In 1953 he was appointed Music Arranger, Editor and Orchestrator for the newly formed Victorian Symphony Orchestra. In his 30 years with what became the Melbourne Symphony Orchestra, Hughes witnessed the gradual building of a world-class ensemble under the sustained stewardship of two conductors, Willem van Otterloo and Hiroyuki Iwaki. During this time he composed at least eight major orchestral scores.

By 1954, Hughes had been offered two overseas scholarships, but again the need for financial security to support his family prevented him from taking up these opportunities. He remained in Australia and received a number of commissions, including Linn O'Dee: A Highland Fancy, commissioned by the Victorian State Government for the state reception for Queen Elizabeth II and the Duke of Edinburgh during the 1954 Royal Visit. He won first prize in the 1954 APRA/ABC Competition.

Robert Hughes was elected to the Board of the Australasian Performing Right Association (APRA) as a Writer/Director in 1958. In 1959, he steered APRA towards establishing the Fellowship of Australian Composers, of which he was a Foundation Member and vice-president for a decade. He was appointed President of the APRA Music Foundation in 1966, and retained this position until the foundation was reconstituted in 1977 to become the APRA Music Committee. Hughes became the first composer to be appointed chairman of the APRA board, a position he held for 25 years.

Hughes was active throughout his life as a supporter and promoter of Australian music. In 1966, as part of a delegation together with John Antill and Harold Evans, he persuaded Menzies (by now Sir Robert Menzies) to form the Commonwealth Assistance to Australian Composers. "We wanted to show him what a composer had to go through, the costs involved with buying paper and ink, and particularly copying scores and parts" Hughes once recalled. "After a two-hour chat, with tea and biscuits, he understood."

He embarked on a world tour under the auspices of APRA in 1967 to promote Australian composition. With the election of the Whitlam government in 1972, Hughes became a member of the first Music Board of the Australian Council for the Arts. In 1974, the Music Board launched the Australian Music Centre (AMC), and Hughes became a board member.

He was the recipient of several awards for his service to music including appointment as a Member of the Order of the British Empire (MBE) for services to music in 1978, the Distinguished Services to Australian Music award at the 2003 Classical Music Awards, and an Officer of the Order of Australia (AO) in 2005.

In 1989 his orchestral composition Fantasia was nominated in the Most Performed Australasian Serious Work category of the 1989 APRA Music Awards.

In 1997, the AMC honoured him with its award for long-term contribution to Australian music.

Hughes was composing music well into his tenth decade. He died on 1 August 2007, aged 95, and was survived by three daughters and five grandchildren.

== List of works (incomplete) ==
- Legend, tone poem (broadcast during WW2)
- Estivall, tone poem (premiered 1941)
- Festival Overture (1949)
- Symphony No. 1 (1951, rev. 1953, 1955, 1971)
- Essay No. 1 (1953; orchestra)
- Linn O’Dee: A Highland Fancy (1954; orchestra)
- Xanadu, ballet suite (1954; inspired by the Samuel Taylor Coleridge poem Kubla Khan; dedicated to Joseph Post, who conducted the premiere with the Melbourne Symphony Orchestra in 1955)
- Sinfonietta, commissioned by the Hallé Orchestra in Britain for its centenary season in 1957
- Orchestration of Margaret Sutherland’s Three Temperaments (1964)
- Farrago Suite (movements: March, Waltz, Pastorale, Burlesque; 1965; orchestra)
- Fantasia (1968; orchestra)
- Synthesis (1969; orchestra)
- Chang-An: music for a Chinese play (the 1960s)
- Sea Spell (orchestra; commissioned for an international conference of dentists in 1973; the first orchestral music played in the Sydney Opera House)
- Five Indian poems (1973; mixed choir and small orchestra; words by Sarojini Naidu)
- Essay No. 2 (1982; orchestra)
- Song for exiles (1991; S.A.T.B. chorus and solo oboe doubling English horn and organ and piano; words by Neil Munro)
- Prelude (organ; 2004)
- The Forbidden Rite dance drama (orchestra; the first full-length Australian ballet written and produced for television)
- Variations on an Irish air for harp and small string orchestra
- Incidental music for a production of Tennessee Williams's The Glass Menagerie, scored for two flutes
- An opera (never performed)
- Come to the fair
- Four interludes – oriental
- Goin’ home
- The intriguers: the story of the clever minstrel and the three scheming suitors, a comedy with music in three acts (lyrics and dialogue by Suzanne Duncalf)
- Mood music
- Invictus (with Bruno Huhn)
- Jinker ride (with Dorian Le Gallienne)
- My journey's end
- Film and television scores:
  - Mike and Stefani (1952)
  - The Life and Death of King Richard II (1960; TV)
  - Macbeth (1965; TV)
  - The Golden Positions (1971: TV)
  - Shady Grove (2013: Written)
