= William Angliss =

Australian politician and businessman

Sir William Angliss
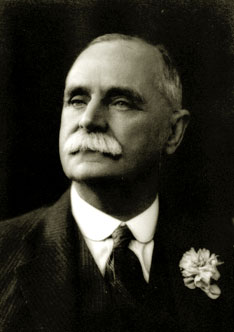

Member of the Legislative Council of Victoria for Southern Province
- In office 1 June 1912 – 1 June 1952
- Preceded by: William Embling
- Succeeded by: Roy Rawson

Personal details
- Born: 29 January 1865 Dudley, Worcestershire, England
- Died: 15 June 1957 (aged 92) Auburn, Victoria, Australia
- Resting place: Box Hill Cemetery
- Party: Liberal Party
- Other political affiliations: Nationalist Party of Australia
- Spouse: Dame Jacobena Angliss
- Occupation: Politician
- Profession: Butcher, meat exporter

Sir William Charles Angliss (29 January 1865 – 15 June 1957) was a butcher, pastoralist, pioneering meat exporter, businessman, and politician in Melbourne, Australia.

== Biography ==
He was the eldest son of William Angliss, tailor, and his wife Eliza Fiddian, born in Dudley, Worcestershire, England. He was educated at Hawkhurst, Kent, and learnt the butcher's trade as a youth, working first with an uncle in London before migrating to New York. After two and a half years in North America, he migrated to Rockhampton, Queensland in 1884. After working for a time in Brisbane and Sydney, he moved to Melbourne in 1886, where he set up a butchers shop in North Carlton. He opened larger premises in Bourke Street, Melbourne in 1892, and started exporting frozen meat, becoming a pioneer of meat refrigeration. His meat export business was highly successful and he opened his own freezing works in Footscray in 1905.

His meat export business expanded into New South Wales and Queensland, and his business also diversified into owning or managing pastoral leases and cattle stations, including jointly with Sidney Kidman.

Angliss married Jacobena Grutzner at St. Columb's Church, Hawthorn, Victoria on 31 March 1919; they had one child, a daughter, Eirene Rose. Jacobena Angliss led a distinguished life as an Australian philanthropist, arts supporter and community worker.

From 1912 to 1952, Angliss was a member of the Legislative Council of Victoria, representing Southern Province, an electorate comprising much of the city of Melbourne and the adjoining rural areas to the south-east. He represented various non-Labor parties, including the Nationalist Party of Australia, the United Australia Party, and the Liberal Party. His most important political contribution is regarded as promoting a system of preferential controls which boosted meat exports, arising from the Ottawa Imperial Conference in 1932, at which he was the official business consultant to the Australian delegation.

In 1934, Angliss sold his meat business to the large British firm of Vesteys for 1.5million GBP, but retained many of his pastoral properties. He was knighted in 1939.

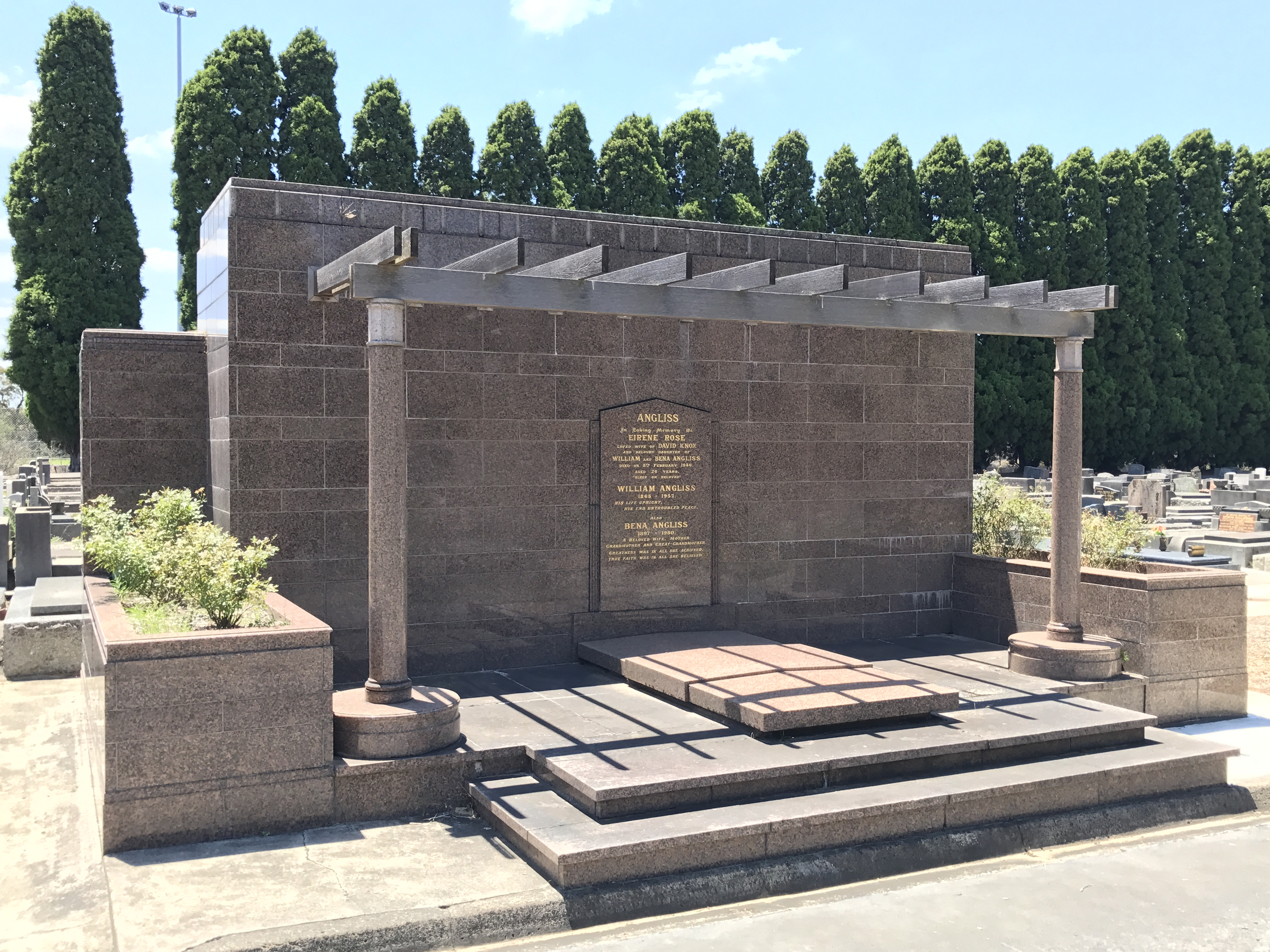
Angliss family grave at Box Hill Cemetery.

Sir William Angliss actively supported various charities, including the Salvation Army and the settlement of migrant children in Australia. In 1940, he donated money to start a specialist trade or technical school specialising in providing vocational education and training opportunities for the hospitality and foods industries. Initially called the William Angliss Food Trades School, apprenticeship courses were offered in pastry, butchery, breadmaking and baking, cooking and waiting. The school is now known as the William Angliss Institute of TAFE, and is highly regarded in its specialty areas of hospitality, cookery, and tourism.

Sir William was also a noted Freemason, belonging to at least two Lodges. He was in one with Billy Guyatt, the well-known electrical goods retailer, R. J. Gilbertson, another well-known butcher, and Tommy Woodcock, the trainer of Phar Lap.

Sir William died on 15 June 1957. In his will, he set aside £1 million for the creation of two charitable funds: one in Victoria and one in Queensland, which are administered by the William Angliss Charitable Fund. He was buried at Box Hill Cemetery.

=== Honours ===
- Knight Bachelor of the British Empire, 8 June 1939 "In recognition of service to the public service in Victoria"

== See also ==
- Angliss Hospital
- Jacobena Angliss
- William Angliss Institute of TAFE
