= Bruce Hungerford =

Australian musician

Bruce Hungerford (24 November 1922 – 26 January 1977), known for the majority of his career as Leonard Hungerford, was an Australian pianist.

== Biography ==
Born in Korumburra, Victoria, Bruce Hungerford was originally named Leonard Sinclair Hungerford. In an undated manuscript he recounts "When it came to naming me my parents were torn between 'Bruce' and 'Leonard.' I think they really wanted Bruce, but I was such a puny specimen that they hardly felt I fitted the name of the Warrior King of Scotland. Then a day or two before I was to be christened, my grandfather journeyed down to see me. He was a Scotsman to the backbone and after taking one look at me said sadly, "This is no 'Bruce', and so the die was cast, at any rate for my first 35 years". It was only in 1958 that Leonard Hungerford changed his professional name to Bruce Hungerford.

From the age of 12, Hungerford studied piano at the University of Melbourne Conservatorium with Roy Shepherd, a student of Alfred Cortot. At 17, he won a full scholarship to the Conservatorium, and made his debut at age 20 with the Melbourne Symphony Orchestra. In February 1940 he was broadcast on radio station, 3UL, performing "Brahms 'Intermezzo' opus 117 No 2 and Liszt's 'Hungarian Rhapsody No 6'." The Argus' reporter caught a joint recital by Hungerford and two associates, in August 1944; the reporter opined that "[he] made the deepest impression. He has progressed far since his earlier efforts at students' concerts and the concerto festival. His playing of the Schubert 'Sonata in A' showed evidence of careful study and an appreciation of his composer, as well as an effective technique."

In 1944 he studied for a short time with Ignaz Friedman in Sydney. His playing impressed the conductor Eugene Ormandy, who suggested he study with Olga Samaroff in Philadelphia. He also received coaching and advice from Myra Hess, who suggested he study with Carl Friedberg, in whom he finally found a teacher who suited him. On the advice of Samaroff (who had died in 1948), he moved to Germany in 1958 with the intention of establishing himself on the concert scene in Europe. It was at this point that he changed his name to Bruce Hungerford. The 1960 Bayreuth Festival Master Classes, Inc. – LO8P-5179 issue of Richard Wagner's complete piano works was credited to Bruce Hungerford.

In 1967, Hungerford was approached by Maynard and Seymour Solomon, the founders and directors of the Vanguard Recording Society, to record the complete piano works of Beethoven. Hungerford moved to the United States, and combined a reduced concert schedule with a teaching appointment in Mannes College of Music.

The recording project was to remain incomplete. On 26 January 1977 in New York City at the age of 54, Hungerford was killed in a road accident, a head-on collision caused by a drunk driver. His mother, his niece and her husband were also killed in the accident.

He left a legacy of nine all-Beethoven records and one record each of works by Brahms, Chopin, and Schubert on the Vanguard label. He also recorded the works of Wagner for piano, issued by the DDR label, Eterna.

In addition to his musical accomplishments, Hungerford was a keen palaeontologist, and studied vertebrate palaeontology at Columbia University and at the Museum of Natural History in New York. He also had a passionate interest in Egyptology. This, and his skill as a photographer, led to his making six research trips to Egypt, the first in 1961 as still photographer on the NBC River Nile Expedition.
