= Dorian Le Gallienne =

Australian composer, teacher and music critic (1915 - 1963)

Dorian Leon Marlois Le Gallienne (19 April 1915 – 27 July 1963) was an Australian composer, teacher and music critic.

== Biography ==
Dorian Le Gallienne was born in Melbourne in 1915. His father, an actor, was born in France, and his mother, a pianist who had studied with G. W. L. Marshall-Hall, was the daughter of the Assistant Astronomer at the Melbourne Observatory. His parents separated in 1924, and his father lived in England thereafter. He attended Melbourne Church of England Grammar School. He was diagnosed with diabetes at age 16. After leaving school, he studied with A. E. H. Nickson at the Melbourne Conservatorium and with Arthur Benjamin and Herbert Howells at the Royal College of Music in London in 1938. In 1939, he travelled in Europe with Richard Downing, a future Chairman of the Australian Broadcasting Commission (ABC), and with whom he later lived in Melbourne in a mud-brick house at Eltham.

He returned to Australia, where he worked for the Commonwealth Department of Information in the overseas broadcasting service, later joining the ABC. He was employed as music critic for The Argus and The Age, both Melbourne newspapers, from 1950 until his death. In an article called "Why Preference for 'Celebrities'?", he criticised the ABC for its lack of support for local music and musicians in its "Celebrity" subscription concerts. From 1951 to 1953 he undertook further study with Gordon Jacob in England. He taught harmony at the University of Melbourne Conservatorium between 1954 and 1960.

His best known work, the Sinfonietta, was written between 1951 and 1956, and was interrupted by the writing of his only completed Symphony (1953). The Sinfonietta is of 12 minutes duration and shows the influence of Shostakovich, Hindemith, Prokofiev and Vaughan Williams. The first two movements were written in Britain, the remainder some years later in Australia. The Symphony was premiered in 1955, the Sinfonietta in 1956. In 1967 the music critic Roger Covell wrote that Le Gallienne's Symphony was 'still the most accomplished and purposive ... written by an Australian'. Rhoderick McNeill has more recently opined that the Symphony is only eclipsed by Robert Hughes's Symphony as the finest Australian symphony of the period. However, it is little known since the score has never been published and the work has never been commercially recorded (although it can be heard at the Australian Music Centre in Sydney).

Another especially significant work of Le Gallienne is his song-cycle, Four Holy Sonnets of John Donne, for low voice and piano. He also wrote music for Tim Burstall's film The Prize (1960), which won a bronze medal at the Venice Film Festival, and worked with Burstall on two other films.

He died of diabetes-induced heart disease in 1963, and was buried in the Eltham cemetery next to the artists' colony Montsalvat. A second symphony remained incomplete at the time of his death.

The Dorian Le Gallienne Award was founded to commemorate his life in music, and is awarded every two years to a composer resident in Victoria. The first award, in 1965, was to Helen Gifford.

== Works ==
- Contes heraldiques, or The sleepy princess (ballet, 1947)
- Beloved, let us love one another
- Blue Wrens (piano)
- The Cactus of the Moon
- Duo (violin and viola; 1956)
- Fanfare
- Farewell! Thou art too dear for my possessing
- Fear no more the heat o' the sun
- Four divine poems of John Donne (1950)
- Four nursery rhymes
- Go, heart (words by James Wedderburn)
- How oft when thou, my music (Shakespeare, sonnet no. 128)
- I had a little nut-tree
- Incidental music to Macbeth (piano)
- Incidental music to Othello (oboe and guitar)
- Jinker ride (piano, with Robert Hughes)
- Legend (2 pianos)
- Most blessed of mornings (short introit for SATB a cappella choir)
- Nocturne (piano)
- No longer mourn for me (Shakespeare, sonnet no. 71)
- O rose, thou art sick (SSATB a cappella choir)
- Overture in E flat (1952)
- Peta White; Grey goose and gander (two traditional songs)
- The Rivals (piano)
- Sinfonietta (1956)
- Solveig's cradle song (from Ibsen's Peer Gynt)
- Sonata (flute and piano; 1943)
- Sonata (piano; recorded by Trevor Barnard)
- Sonata (violin and piano; 1945)
- Sonatina in E minor for piano duet (1941)
- Symphonic study (piano, 1940?)
- Symphony in E (1953)
- There was a king
- Three piano pieces
- Three psalms (SATB choir and organ)
- Trio for oboe, violin and viola (1957)
- Voyageur, ballet (1954)

== See also ==
- French Australians

== Sources ==
- Australian Music Centre
- Australian Dictionary of Biography
- Music Australia
- ABC Classic FM
- Music Australia
