= George Logie-Smith =

- Born: 2 December 1914; Melbourne, Australia
- Origin: Australia
- Died: 19 April 2007 (aged 92) Melbourne, Australia
- Genre: Classical
- Occupation: Educator, conductor
- Years active: 1936–1990

George Logie-Smith OBE (2 December 1914 – 19 April 2007) was an Australian orchestra and choral conductor, music examiner, and music educator.

== Biography ==
George Logie Smith was born in Ascot Vale a suburb of Melbourne, to parents David Edgar "Edgar" Smith and Margaret Jane "Maggie" (née Logie) who had migrated to Australia from Scotland before he was born. His birth registration shows the year of birth as 1913 although more usually his birth is recorded as 2 December 1914. At age 15 he conducted Handel's Messiah at a local church. He studied piano with Roy Shepherd, a pupil of Alfred Cortot. He won a number of piano competitions and gave recitals. Shepherd was appointed Director of Music at Geelong College in 1936, but had to withdraw within a year due to illness. He persuaded the headmaster, the Rev. Frank (later Sir Francis) Rolland, to appoint the 22-year-old Logie-Smith in his place, despite him having no academic qualifications or teacher training. The college's annual production of Gilbert and Sullivan operas at Geelong's largest cinema, under Logie-Smith's direction, became an event in Geelong's cultural life.

In 1948 he took a year's leave from the college to study conducting in England with Sir Adrian Boult and John Barbirolli. In 1958 he was appointed director of music at Scotch College, where he was responsible for greatly expanding both the professional music staff as well as the proportion of boys studying an instrument. The school orchestra reached a standard that was considered close to professional. He led the orchestra on tours of South-East Asia and New Zealand. He also coached football, and led the college's 1st XVIII to a premiership in 1968.

At various times, he conducted the Melbourne Youth Symphonic Band, the Astra Chamber Orchestra, the Frankston Symphony Orchestra and the Grainger Wind Symphony, the last of which he founded as music director in 1986. He also founded the Astra Choir in 1958.

He conducted on a number of LP recordings of music by Australian composers, including a recording of orchestral music with solo parts for saxophone, played by Peter Clinch.

One of the Australian pianist Geoffrey Tozer's earliest public performances was in 1964, when aged about 10, with the Astra Chamber Orchestra under Logie-Smith's direction.

For some years, he was also the Victorian Universities Schools Examination Board's Chief Examiner of HSC Music A.

== Honours ==
In 1955 he was appointed a Member of the Order of the British Empire (MBE), and this was upgraded to Officer (OBE) status in 1971.

His name is perpetuated in the Logie-Smith Auditorium at Geelong College, the George Logie-Smith Foundation at Scotch College, and a music room at Genazzano FCJ College, where he also taught.

== Personal life ==
He married Enid Buchanan in 1941. She died in 2002. They were survived by three sons, seven grandchildren and a great-grandchild.
