= Keith Humble =

Australian pianist, composer and educator

Keith Humble AM
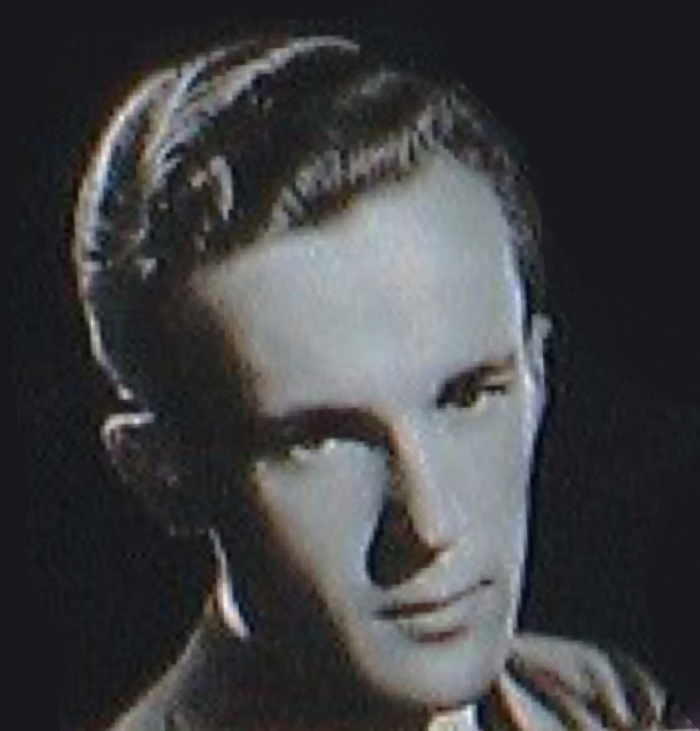

Background information
- Born: 6 September 1927
- Died: May 23, 1995 (aged 67)
- Occupation: Composer
- Instrument: Piano

Leslie Keith Humble AM (1927–1995) was an Australian pianist, composer, and professor of music.

== Career ==
Keith Humble was born 6 September 1927 in Geelong, Victoria. He began learning piano at age five, and later formed his own swing jazz band while at school.

He studied at Westgarth Central School and University High School after his family had moved to Northcote, and in 1947 he studied piano with Roy Shepherd at the University of Melbourne's Conservatorium of Music.

During the 1950s, Humble travelled to Paris, where he founded and served as director of the Centre de Musique at the American Center in Paris. He returned to Australia in 1966 and founded the Society for the Private Performance of New Music and the Electronic Music Studio at the University of Melbourne's Grainger Centre. This included creating electronic instruments such as the Optronic Workstation, and furthering the work of Percy Grainger.

In 1974 Humble was appointed foundation professor of music at La Trobe University, where he further experimented with electronic music and the avant-garde. He resigned from this position in 1984 to focus on composition.

Following the death of Keith Humble in 1995, his widow Jill Humble assisted in the opening of The Keith Humble Centre for Music and the Performing Arts at Geelong College. In 2000, Latrobe University named one of their performance spaces the Keith Humble Auditorium in his honour.

== Honours ==
As part of the 1982 Queen's Birthday Honours, Humble was made a Member (AM) in the General Division of the Order of Australia.
