= Jacobena Angliss =

Australian philanthropist

Dame Jacobena Victoria Alice Angliss, DBE (née Grutzner; 23 May 1896 – 10 November 1980), known as Bena Angliss, was an Australian philanthropist, arts supporter, and community worker.

== Biography ==
She was born in Epping, Victoria as Jacobena Victoria Alice Grutzner, daughter of Jacob and Frances (née Ladhams) Grutzner. Jacobena Grutzner married butcher and meat exporter William Charles Angliss (1865–1957) at St. Columb's Church, Hawthorn, Victoria on 31 March 1919; they had one child, a daughter, Eirene Rose.

Jacobena Angliss's husband, William (who was knighted in 1939), was a member of the Legislative Council of Victoria from 1912 to 1952, had wide experience in industry management and accumulated great wealth through the establishment of a number of pastoral companies. In his will, he set aside £1 million for the creation of a charitable trust. Lady Angliss, who was also involved with several charities, became chairman of the trust. Along with being trustee of the William Angliss Estate, she was chairman of the Bluff Downs Pastoral Company and of Miranda Downs Properties Ltd.

A member of both the Lyceum and Alexandra clubs in Melbourne, Lady Angliss enjoyed gardening and music. She was president of the Astra Chamber Music Society and director of the National Memorial Theatre. On 1 January 1975 she was created a Dame Commander (DBE) of the Order of the British Empire for community and welfare services. She had previously been made a Commander of the order (CBE) on 9 June 1949 for her work as President of the Child Welfare Association of Victoria.

== Death ==
Dame Jacobena Angliss died on 10 November 1980, aged 84, and was buried in Box Hill cemetery alongside her husband. Her granddaughter, Diana Gibson (née Knox), is today a prominent Victorian philanthropist, and is the chair of the William Angliss Charitable Fund.

== Sources ==
- Australian Dictionary of Biography (entry on Sir William Charles Angliss) by E. A. Beever, Vol. 7, p. 71
- Who's Who in Australia, 1977 (ISBN#?)
- Angliss, J. V. (Jacobena Victoria), Lady, 1897-1980, Sir William Angliss : an intimate biography; Melbourne, 1960
- Women of Australia biography
