= Heinrich Schütz House =

Heinrich Schütz House may refer to,

- Heinrich Schütz House, Bad Köstritz
- Heinrich Schütz House, Weißenfels
