= Sebastian Knüpfer =

German composer, conductor and educator

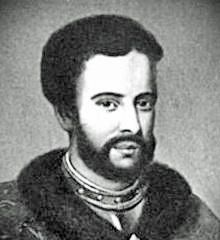
Sebastian Knüpfer

Sebastian Knüpfer (6 September 1633 – 10 October 1676) was a German composer, conductor and educator. He was the Thomaskantor, cantor of the Thomanerchor in Leipzig and director of the towns's church music, from 1657 to 1676.

== Life ==
Most of the biographical information about Knüpfer comes from a published obituary. He was born in Asch (now Aš, Czech Republic), and was first taught music by his father, a Kantor and organist. He also studied regularly with an unidentified tutor living near Asch, from whom he gained a solid grounding in, and lasting love for, a number of scholastic disciplines. At the age of 13 he entered the Gymnasium Poeticum at Regensburg and remained there for eight years. During this unusually long period he became well versed in the city's musical traditions (such as the works of Andreas Raselius), studied the organ, perhaps with Augustin Gradenthaler, and mastered a number of humanistic subjects, especially the poetic arts and philology. His gifts as a student were supported by scholarships from the city of Regensburg, and he was commended by influential members of the staff of the Gymnasium and the city council, some of the latter providing him with favourable testimonials when he moved to Leipzig in 1654. It is not known why he went there, but in view of his lifelong desire to improve his mind, it was possibly because he planned to enter the university. He did not, however, do so.

During his first few years in Leipzig, Knüpfer gave music lessons and sang as a bass in church choirs, displaying enough talent to take solo parts. He applied for the post of Thomaskantor when Tobias Michael died on 26 June 1657, and he was appointed on 17 July; the four other candidates to whom he was preferred included Adam Krieger. In Knüpfer the Thomaskirche found a Kantor and the city of Leipzig a director of music who came close to the musical and intellectual calibre of Sethus Calvisius and Johann Hermann Schein, his two predecessors. During his 19-year tenure Leipzig once again became the leading musical city in central Germany following the sharp decline resulting from the Thirty Years War, the long Swedish occupation of the city and his protracted illness. Knüpfer thus initiated a final period of musical excellence in Leipzig that culminated in the careers of his three successors, Johann Schelle, Johann Kuhnau and Johann Sebastian Bach. Although never a student at the university, he continued the study of philosophy and philology with members of the faculty and was thought of as a member of the academic community. He was praised for his command of classical sources concerning music, which he mastered from Meibom’s editions published in 1652; he studied the treatises of, among others, Guido of Arezzo, Boethius, Berno of Reichenau and Athanasius Kircher. In addition to his productive career as Kantor he is known to have travelled to Halle to direct his own music for the dedication of new organs, for the Marktkirche on 15 February 1664 and the Ulrichskirche on 16 November 1675; also he directed a programme of music for the centenary of the Halle Gymnasium on 17 August 1665. His circle of musical colleagues included many men important in 17th-century German music, such as Johann Christoph Pezel, Johann Rosenmüller and Johann Kaspar Horn, and he may well have known Heinrich Schütz. He died in Leipzig, Germany. That he was regarded as one of Leipzig’s leading intellectual figures is indicated by the unusual honour of his being accorded an academic funeral at the university even though he had never been officially connected with it.

== Works ==
Knüpfer’s output consisted almost entirely of sacred works to Latin or German texts. Many are lost, and of those that survive few have been published in modern editions. Most are in the traditional style and form of the 17th-century vocal concerto, incorporating many of the characteristics of similar works by Heinrich Schütz – though with no traces of the latter's uniquely personal style. Large choral forms are enhanced by an orchestra of substantial size (most commonly two violins, three violas, bassoon with continuo, clarinos, trombone and timpani), which supports the choral parts as well as interjecting all manner of colourful concerted effects. The choral writing may be massively chordal or intricately polyphonic, and there are a number of much simpler concerted passages for soloists supported only by the continuo. Knüpfer frequently based his German works on the text and melody of a chorale, and he was a master at deriving contrapuntal ideas from motivic fragmentation of the chorale. In many of these works the chorale verses are treated much as they are in slightly later German cantatas in which each verse is set separately. An opening choral movement, usually of large proportions and often repeated at the end of the work, is succeeded by movements designed for soloists. These are often ariosos or include fugal writing in which the chorale melody is passed back and forth between the voices in a duet or trio texture – a technique akin to that found in Bach’s organ chorale preludes. Other movements display dramatic use of expressive recitative: there is a good example in Wer ist, der so von Edom kِommt (excerpt in Schering, 1926, p. 162).

Knüpfer’s music is primarily serious and profoundly devout, though he did publish a collection of the secular madrigals and canzonettas (1663) that he wrote for the university student with whom he worked in the collegium musicum at Leipzig. His contrapuntal mastery, the powerful drama of his thematic ideas, his brilliant instrumentation and the variety of his vocal scoring all contribute to the impression of him as a worthy predecessor of Bach, many of whose Leipzig church cantatas belong to a tradition first developed by Knüpfer.

== Sacred works ==
- Ach Herr, lass deine lieben Engelein, SSATB, 2 vn, 2 violettas, bn, 2 clarinos, tamburi, 2 fl, bc
- Ach Herr, strafe mich nicht (Ps 6), SSATB, 2 vn, 2 violettas, bn, 2 clarinos, 2 fl, tamburi, bc
- Ach mein herzliebes Jesulein, 5vv, ripieno 5vv, 2 vn, 2 va, 2 cornetts, 3 trombones, vle, bc
- Ach, wenn kommet doch die Stunde, aria, A/T, 3 va, vle, bc
- Alleluja, man singet mit Freuden, 5vv, 8 insts
- Asche, die des Schöpfers Händ, 5vv, lost, extant in parody version by Z. Haenisch,
- Der Gerechte wird grünen wie ein Palmbaum, SSATB, 2 violins, violetta, 2 va, 2 cornets, 3 trombones, viole, bc
- Der Herr ist König, SSAATTBB, 2 violins, 5 va, 7 trombones, bc
- Der Herr ist mein Hirt, B, violine, 3 violas, bc
- Der Herr schaffet deinen Gränzen Friede, ATB, 2 violins, trombone, bc
- Der Seegen des Herren machet reich, SAATB, 2 violins, 3 violas, bc
- Dies ist der Tag, den der Herr macht, SSATB, ripieno SSATB, 2 violins, 2 va, bn, 2 clarinos, 2 trombones, bc
- Dies ist der Tag des Herrn, a 16 – SSATB, 2 violins, 2 violas, 2 clarini, timpani, 3 trombones, bassoon, bc
- Die Turteltaube lässt sich hören – SSATB, 2 violins, 2 violas, 4 clarini, timpani, bassoon, bc
- Erforsche mich, Gott – SATB, SATB, bc, funeral motet, 14 May 1673
- Erheb dich, meine Seele, SATB, funeral motet, 1676
- Erhöre, Jesulein, mein sehnlichs, S, 4 strings
- Erstanden ist der heilge Christ, SSATB, 2 violins, 4 va, bn, bombard, 2 clarinos, 2 tpt, tamburi, bc
- Es haben mir die Hoffärtigen – SATB, 2 violins, 3 violas, bassoon, bc
- Es ist eine Stimme eines Predigers in der Wüsten, SATB, 2 violins, 3 violas, bassoon, bc
- Es spricht der Unweisen Mund wohl, SSAATTBB, 2 violins, 3 violas, 2 cornetts, 3 trombones, bassoon, bc, on Luther's hymn
- Gelobet sey Gott, SSATB, instruments, bc
- Gen Himmel zu dem Vater mein, SSATTB, 2 vn, 2 clarinos, timp, 2 trombones, bn, bc
- Gott sei mir gnädig nach deiner Güte, SSATB, (ripieno SSATB?), 4 va, bn, vle, bc
- Herr Christ, der eining Gottes Sohn – SSATB, 2 violins, 3 violas, 2 cornetts, 3 trombones, bassoon, bc
- Herr, hilf uns, wir verderben, SATB, 2 vn, 2 va, bn, bc
- Herr, ich habe lieb die Stätte deines Hauses, ATB, 2 vn, va, bc
- Herr Jesu Christ, wahr Mensch, SSATB, (ripieno SSATB?), 2 vn, violone/bassoon, bc, on Eber's hymn "Herr Jesu Christ, wahr Mensch und Gott"
- Herr, lehre mich thun nach deinem, SATTB, (ripieno SATTB?), 2 vn, 3 va, bn, bc
- Herr, lehre uns bedenken, SSATTB, 2 vn, 3 va, bn, bc
- Herr, strafe mich nicht in deinem Zorn – SATB, 3 violas, violone/bassoon, bc
- Herr, wer wird wohnen in deinen Hütten, SAB, 2 cornetts, 3 va, bc
- Ich freue mich in dir, SSATB, 2 vn, 2 va, 3 trombones, 2 fl, violone, bc
- Ich habe dich zum Licht der Heiden gemacht, SATTB, (ripieno SATTB?), 2 vn, 3 va, bn, 2 cornettinos, 3 trombones, bc
- Ich will singen von der Gnade, SATB, (ripieno SATB), 2 vn, 3 va, bn, bc
- Jauchzet dem Herrn alle Welt, SATB, SATB, 2 vn, 3 va, bn, 2 clarinos, 2 cornettinos, tpt, 2 trombones, bc
- Jesu, meine Freud und Wonne, 5vv, 5 insts
- Jesus Christus, unser Heiland – SSATB, 2 violins, 3 violas, bassoon, bc
- Justus ut palma florebit, SATB, bc
- Komm du schöne Freudenkrone, SSATB, 2 vn, 3 violettas, violetta/bn, 2 clarinos, tamburi, 3 trombones, bc
- Komm heilger Geist, SATB, (ripieno SATB), 4 va, 4 trombones, bc
- Kommet herzu, lasset uns den Herzen frohlocken, SSATB, 2 violins, violas, bc
- Lass dir gefallen, 2vv, 4 insts
- Lauda Jerusalem, SATB, 2 violins, violone, bn, bc
- Machet die Thore weit, SSATB, (ripieno SSATB), 2 vn, 4 va, 2 cornetts/bombards, 3 trombones, bc
- Mein Gott, betrübt ist meine Seele, SSATTB, bc, funeral motet, 20 Oct 1667
- Mein Herz hält dir für dein Wort, SAT, 2 vn, bn, bc
- Missa (brevis) super Freu dich selig, SSAATTB, 2 violins, 5 violas, bc
- Missa (brevis) super Herr Jesu Christ, wahr Mensch und Gott, SSATTB, 2 violins, 5 violas, bc
- Missa (brevis) super O welt ich muss dich lassen, SSAATTB, 2 violins, 5 violas, bc
- Nun dancket alle Gott, SSATTB, 2 vn, 3 va, bc
- Nun freut euch, lieben Christen gemein, SSTTB, 2 vn, 2 va, bn, bc
- O benignissime Jesu, ATB, 2 vn/cornettinos, va da gamba/bombard, bc
- Quaemadmodum desiderat cervus – B solo, SSATB, bc
- Quare fremuerunt gentes, SSATTB, 2 vn, 3 va, 2 cornetts, 4 trombones, bc
- Sende dein Licht, SATB, (ripieno SATB), 2 vn, 2 va, bn, bc
- Super flumina Babylonis – SATB, 2 violins, 3 violas, 2 cornettini, 3 trombones, bassoon, bc
- Surgite populi: De resurrectione et ascensione Domini, SATB, SATB, 2 vn, 3 va, bn, 2 cornettinos, cornett, 5 tpt, 3 trombones, timp, bc
- Veni Sancte Spiritus, SSATB, 2 vn, 2 va, bn, 4 clarinos, 2 cornettinos, 3 trombones, timp, bc
- Victoria, die Fürsten sind geschlagen, 5vv, 2 vn, 2 va, bn, 3 trombones, bc
- Vom Himmel hoch, da komm ich her:
  - chorus angelorum: SSS, 3 violas; SSS, 3 violins ripieni
  - choro dei pastori: ATB, 3 bombardi
  - choro pieno: SATB, 2 clarini, timpani, harp, bc
- Was mein Gott will, das g'scheh allzeit – SSATTB, 2 violins, 3 violas, 2 cornets, 3 trombones, bassoon, bc
- Was sind wir Menschen doch, SATB, funeral ode, 22 May 1672
- Was werden wir essen, dialogue, SATB, 4 violas, bc
- Weichet von mir, ihr Boshaftigen, SSATTB, funeral motet, 16 June 1661
- Welt Vater du! O Adam deine Kinder, 2 S, 3 va, vle, bc
- Wenn mein Stündlein vorhanden ist – SATB, 2 violins, 2 violas, violone, bc
- Wer ist, der so von Edom Kommt – SAB, 4 violas, bc
- Wer ist, der so von Edom Kommt – SSATB, 2 violins, 2 violas, 4 trombetti, timpani, bassoon, bc
- O Traurigkeit, o Hertzeleid, Grab-Lied über die Begräbnis … Jesu Christi (J. Rist), 4vv, in G. Vopelius, Gesangbuch (Leipzig, 1682)

== Secular music ==
- Lustige Madrigalien, 2–4vv, und Canzonetten, 1–3vv, insts (Leipzig, 1663)
