= Colander (disambiguation) =

A colander is a kitchen utensil for draining food. It may also refer to:

- Anton Colander (1590–1621), Saxon (German) composer and organist
- David Colander (1947–2023), American economist
- LaTasha Colander (born 1976), American track and field athlete

== See also ==
- Kolander, a surname
- Kolindros, a town in Greece
- Calender, used in paper manufacturing
- Qalandar (disambiguation)
