= Johann Wilhelm Furchheim =

Johann Wilhelm Furchheim (Dresden, ca. 1635–1682) was a German violinist, composer and organist, a pupil of Heinrich Schütz. Like his colleague Clemens Thieme he came from the neighborhood around the Dresden court.

== Works, editions and recordings ==
- Sonata in D major
- Sonatella in A major

both scored for three violins, two violas, and continuo.
