= Hartmannsdorf =

Hartmannsdorf may refer to the following places:

== In Austria ==
- Markt Hartmannsdorf, in Styria

== In Germany ==
- Hartmannsdorf, Mittelsachsen, in Saxony
- Hartmannsdorf, Greiz, in the Greiz district, Thuringia
- Hartmannsdorf, Saale-Holzland, in the Saale-Holzland district, Thuringia
- Hartmannsdorf bei Kirchberg, in the Zwickau district, Saxony
- A part of Hartmannsdorf-Reichenau in the Sächsische Schweiz-Osterzgebirge district, Saxony
- A part of Lübben (Spreewald), Brandenburg

== In Poland ==
- Miłoszów, (formerly known as Hartmannsdorf) in Silesia
