= Küttel =

Küttel is a surname (a variant of Kittel). Notable people with the surname include:

- Andreas Küttel (born 1979), Swiss ski jumper
- Arno Küttel (born 1963), Swiss racing cyclist
- Dimitrij Küttel (born 1994), Swiss handball player
- Joseph Küttel (1952–1997), Swiss footballer
