= Kittel (surname) =

Kittel is a surname and given name. Notable people with the name include:

- Kittel Halvorson (1846–1936), a U.S. Representative from Minnesota
- Adolf Kittel, Czech middle-distance runner
- Bertold Kittel (pl)
- Bruno Kittel (1922–?), Nazi officer
- Bruno Kittel (conductor) (1870–1948), German violinist and conductor (de)
- Caspar Kittel (1603–1639), a German composer
- Charles Kittel (1916-2019), American physicist
- Christoph Kittel (fl. 1640-1680), German organist
- Elżbieta Zawadowska-Kittel (pl)
- Emmy Kittel (1878–1930), Czech operatic soprano
- Eugen Kittel (1859–1946), German engineer (de)
- Ferdinand Kittel (1832–1903), German priest, missionary and indologist
- August Wilson (1945–2005) (born Frederick August Kittel), American playwright
- Gerhard Kittel (1888–1948), German theologian and lexicographer of biblical languages
- Heinrich Kittel (1892–1969), German officer
- Helmuth Kittel (1902–1984), German theologian
- Hermine Kittel (1879–1948), Austrian singer
- Johann Christian Kittel (1732–1809), German composer
- Kaspar Kittel, the composer also known as Caspar Kittel (see above)
- Marcel Kittel (born 1988), German cyclist
- Marlon Kittel (born 1983), German actor
- Martin Baldwin Kittel (1796–1885)
- Nicolaus Kittel (1830s–1870), German-Russian bow maker
- Otto Kittel (1917–1945), Silesian-German World War II pilot
- Rudolf Kittel (1853–1929), German Old Testament scholar
- Jan Bedřich Kittl/Johann Friedrich Kittl
- Walter Kittel
- Zygmunt Kittel

== See also ==
- Kittle (disambiguation)
- Kittlová
