= Heinrich Schütz House, Weißenfels =

Museum in Weissenfels, Germany

Heinrich Schütz House
- Heinrich-Schütz-Haus
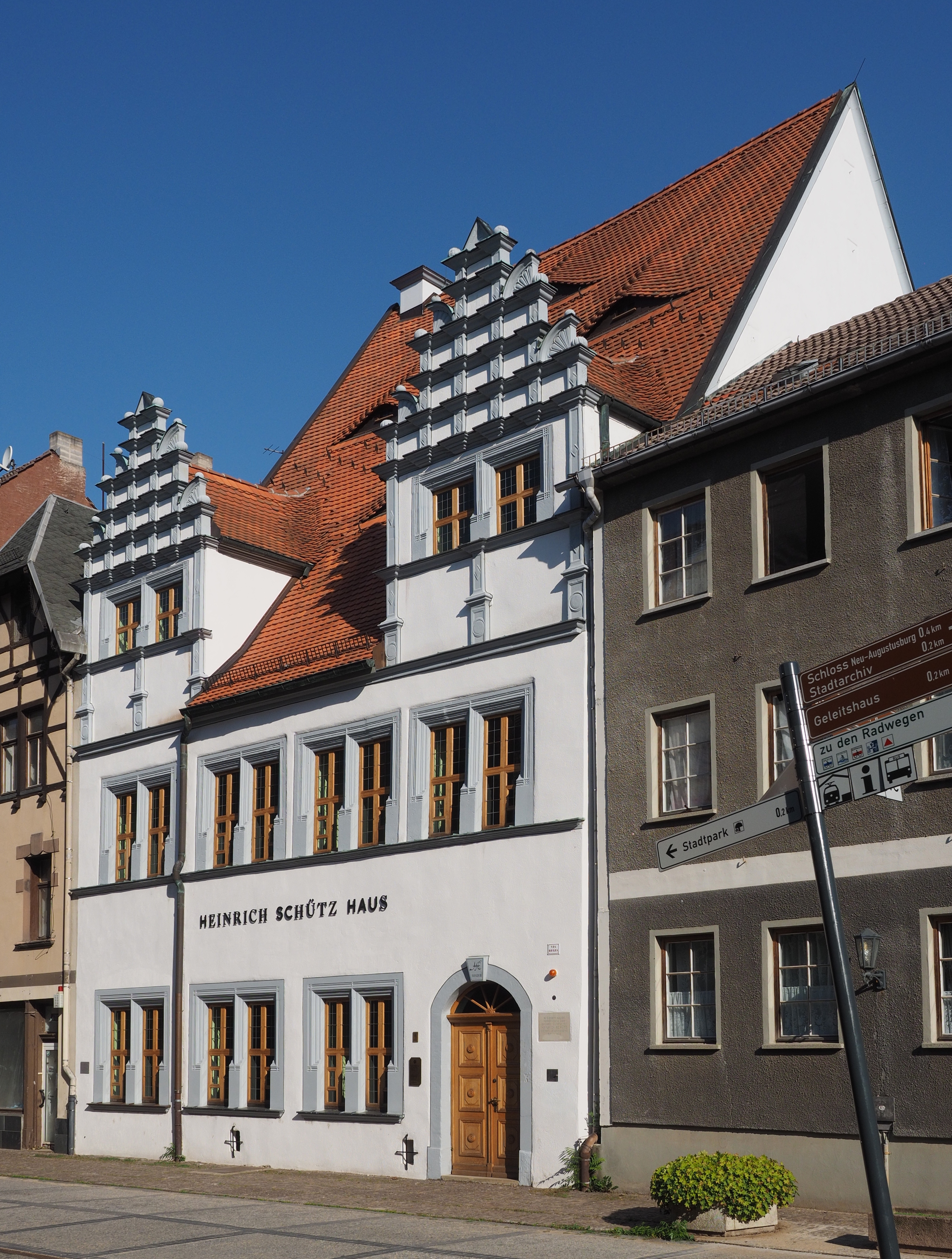
- The house in 2015

General information
- Address: Heinrich-Schütz-Haus; Nikolaistraße 13; D-06667 Weißenfels
- Country: Germany
- Coordinates: 51°11′58.6″N 11°58′16″E

Website
- https://schuetzhaus-weissenfels.de/en/

Heinrich Schütz House is a cultural site in Weißenfels, in Saxony-Anhalt, Germany. The composer Heinrich Schütz (1585–1672) lived here during his later years; the house is now a museum about his life and work.

== History ==
=== Schütz in Weißenfels ===
Schütz lived in Weißenfels from 1590, aged six, when the family moved here from Köstritz, the composer's birthplace. His father Christoph Schütz took one of the inns in the town. Moritz, Landgrave of Hesse-Kassel, staying overnight at the inn in 1599, discovered Heinrich's musical talent and offered to have him educated; Heinrich moved to the landgrave's court in Kassel, where he was a choirboy. Later, during his career as composer, Schütz mainly lived in Dresden.

The house in Nikolaistraße was built in 1552. Schütz bought the house in 1651, for his retirement, and he lived here from 1657, with his widowed sister Justina Thörmer. He moved to Dresden in 1672, and died there later that year.

=== The house ===
The museum, founded in 1985, is administered by the town of Weißenfels.

The house was restored from 2010 to 2012. In the ground floor and upper floor there is a permanent exhibition about Schütz's life and works. In the attic is the restored Komponierstube (composing room), where he composed his late works. In the room are two fragments of handwritten music by Schütz that were discovered in the building.

Staff at the museum carry out research about Schütz and about the musical life of Weißenfels, resulting in publications, exhibitions and events. In 2006 the house was included in the list of cultural heritage sites in the Blaubuch (Blue Book) of the federal government.

== See also ==
- Heinrich Schütz House (Bad Köstritz), a museum at the composer's birthplace
