= Gustav von Hüfner =

German chemist (1840–1908)

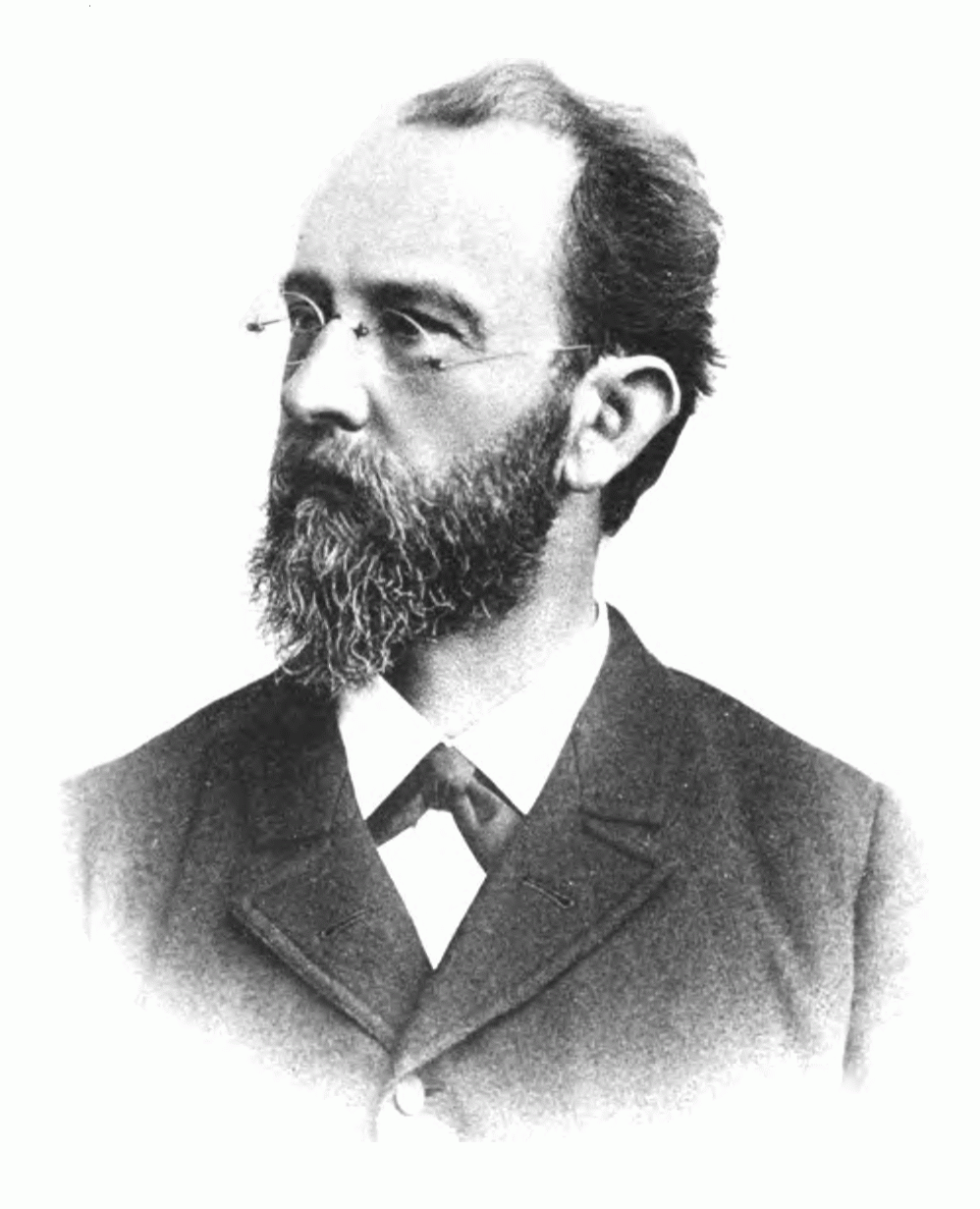
Gustav von Hüfner

Gustav von Hüfner (13 May 1840 in Köstritz – 14 March 1908 in Tübingen) was a German chemist.

From 1860 to 1865 he studied medicine at the University of Leipzig, and while a student, attended lectures given by biologists Carl Gegenbaur and Matthias Jakob Schleiden at the University of Jena. After graduation, he trained under physiologist Carl Ludwig and chemist Hermann Kolbe at Leipzig, and studied in the laboratory of Robert Bunsen at the University of Heidelberg. In 1869 he obtained his habilitation, and three years later, succeeded Felix Hoppe-Seyler at the University of Tübingen. In 1875, he was appointed a full professor of organic and physiological chemistry at the university.

He is best known for his research involving blood chemistry. The term "Hüfner number" is defined as the amount of oxygen that can bind with one gram of hemoglobin when fully saturated. In 1894 Hüfner determined that a gram of hemoglobin could maximally bind 0.0598 millimoles (1.34mL) of oxygen gas.

== Selected writings ==
- Beitrag zur Lehre von der Athmung der Eier, 1894.
- Neue Versuche zur Bestimmung der Sauerstoffcapacität des Blutfarbstoffs, 1894.
- Über den Ursprung und die Berechtigung besonderer Lehrstühle für physiologische Chemie, 1899.
