= Xingu (beer) =

Brazilian beer brand

- Type: Beer
- Origin: Brazil
- Introduced: 1986
- Alcohol by volume: Black: 4.6% Gold: 4.7%
- Website: www.xingubeer.com

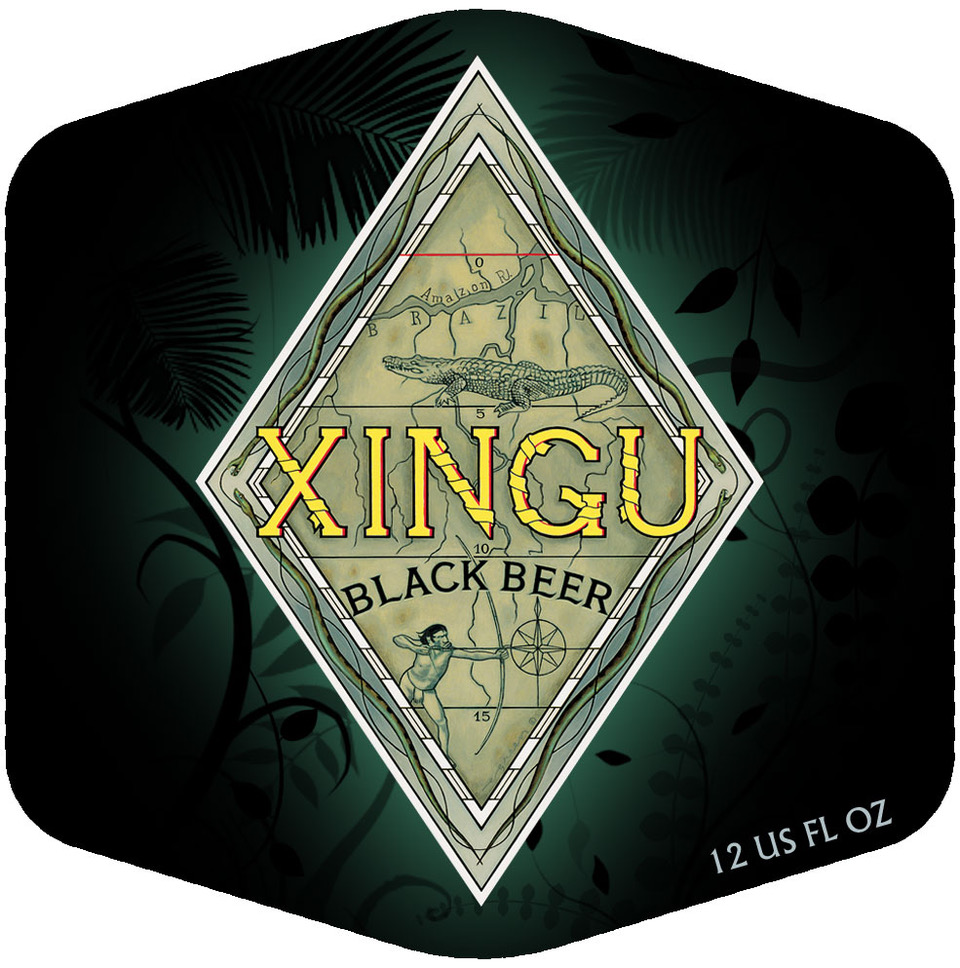
Original Xingu beer label by artist Eric Green

Xingu is a Brazilian beer brand. It was created by Amazon, Inc., a Brattleboro, Vermont based beer import company, founded by Anne Latchis and four women friends in June 1986. Anne's husband, beer historian Alan D. Eames was the guiding consultant on the project and artist Eric Green was contracted with to design the original diamond-shaped map label. The concept of the brand was inspired by the history of women brewing a "beer-like" fermented beverage from manioc root in the Amazon region of Brazil. The black lager style, or schwarzbier, was chosen to resurrect a nearly extinct style of beer in the US market. The brand was named for the Xingu River, a tributary of the Amazon River, to raise awareness of the need for conservation to protect the rainforest environment and home to the surviving members of the Kayapo native tribes. The original Xingu Black Beer label, created as a painting by Eric Green, depicts a map of the Xingu River region, anaconda snakes, a caiman, and a Kayapo native with lip disc.

== History ==
Amazon, Inc. of Vermont owned the Xingu Beer brand name and trademark, and Amazon, Inc. President Anne Latchis imported and marketed the brand from 1986 through 2001 selling in 35 states. Brazilian entrepreneur Cesario Mello Franco managed the Brazilian production and shipping of Xingu Black Beer, first contracting the brewing and bottling operation with Cervejaria Caçador in Santa Catarina, Brazil, in 1987. The first shipment arrived in the US in February 1988 and Xingu Black Beer was first introduced by Eames to the U.S. at the Culinary Institute of America in Hyde Park, NY in 1988.

In 2001, Amazon, Inc. sold the trademark to its Brazilian supplier Cervejas Premium do Brasil, Ltda.

The original Xingu Beer, created in 1986, was an opaque black lager beer with a 6.7% abv. In 2013, the Xingu brand became a line of beers with the introduction of Xingu Gold.

Cervejas Premium do Brasil, Ltda has been selling the Xingu brand line of beers in over 20 countries. Originally known for its Xingu Black Beer, the brand has expanded to include Xingu Gold, Xingu Weiss, and a Zoigl style, Xingu Red. More styles of the Xingu brand are in development in 2023.

Xingu Black was re-launched in Brazil in 2022, winning a Gold Medal at The Festival Paulista de Cervejas.

Xingu is a beer recognized worldwide and has been awarded top ratings for its quality in the USA, Brazil and Europe.

== Awards ==
- Beverage Testing Institute, Gold Medal (1998) – Xingu Black Beer
- Beverage Testing Institute, Gold Medal (1999)–- Xingu Black Beer
- Beverage Testing Institute, Gold Medal (2005) – Xingu Gold Beer
- Los Angeles International Beer Competition, Gold Medal (2017) – Xingu Black Beer
- Los Angeles International Beer Competition, Silver Medal (2017) – Xingu Gold Beer
