= Clemens Thieme =

German composer

Clemens Thieme (or Thiem, or Tieme) (September 7, 1631, in Grossdittmansdorf, Dresden – March 27, 1668, in Zeitz) was a German Baroque composer. He was born in the area around the Dresden court and studied as a pupil of Philipp Stolle. When he was eleven, Heinrich Schütz arranged for him to serve as choirboy for the royal court in Copenhagen, Denmark. After Thieme's voice broke, Schütz arranged for him to study and be a court musician in Dresden; in 1663, with the assistance of Schütz, he became a court instrumentalist in Saxe-Zeitz and eventually its Konzertmeister. While scholars know of about 100 works of his in both instrumental and choral genres, only 18 have survived.

== Works, editions and recordings ==
- Sonatas
- Rondeau
