= Köstritzer =

German brewery

- .
- Interactive map of Köstritzer
- Location: Bad Köstritz, Thuringia, Germany
- Coordinates: 50°55′50″N 12°0′53″E
- Opened: 1543 (483 years ago)
- Annual production volume: 700,000 hectolitres (600,000 US bbl)
- Owner: Bitburger (since 1991)

Active beers
Name	Type
Köstritzer Schwarzbier	Schwarzbier
Köstritzer Edel-Pils	Pilsener
Köstritzer Diät-Pils	Dry beer

The Köstritzer brewery is one of the oldest producers of Schwarzbier (black beer) in Germany. It is in Bad Köstritz, close to Gera in Thuringia.

== History ==
The brewery was first mentioned in inheritance tax documents as "Köstritzer Inheritance" in 1543, which makes it one of the oldest breweries in Germany. In 1696, the Counts of House Reuss acquired the brewery and renamed it to the "Knightly Estate Brewery." Since 1806, the brewery has been permitted to use the title "Princely Brewery" since the Knights of House Reuss were promoted to princes. In 1811, 6400 hectoliters (hl)(169,070.1 gallons) of different beers were produced and sold in cities as far away as Berlin, Dresden, Magdeburg and Frankfurt am Main.

Johann Wolfgang von Goethe, who lived in Weimar, is recorded as having mainly bought beers of various types, from the Köstritz and Oberweimar breweries as well as bread rolls. On November 17, 1823, the scholar Wilhelm von Humboldt wrote from Weimar, to his wife Caroline von Humboldt and others, about his and Goethe's diet:

"Since I stopped drinking tea, it's all over. Once I'm on the edge of the abyss and one step further, I'm swimming in beer. Oh God!, dear child, Goethe doesn't have an appetite for anything, not for bouillon, meat, vegetables; he lives on beer and bread rolls, drinks large glasses in the morning and debates with the servant whether he should drink dark or light brown Köstritzer or Oberweimarisches beer – or whatever the Greul are called. But he usually goes into another room when I'm there. The shyness does not go completely out in a human breast."

In 1829 the company along with 15 other buildings in Köstritz burned down. As a result, the brewery was rebuilt in the west wing of the palace. In 1872 the agricultural inspector and later entrepreneur Rudolf Zersch leased from the House of Reuss the domains of Köstritz, Dürrenberg and Hartmannsdorf and in 1875 the Princely Brewery Köstritz. The latter was initially expanded in the castle and at other production sites in Köstritz under the direction of master brewer Carl Holomoucky.

Under Holomoucky, the varieties Köstritzer Schwarzbier and the lager Blume des Elsterthales were initially produced. From the 19th century to the first half of the 20th century, black beer was said to have a health enhancing effect. In an advertisement from 1893, the brewery advertised that it was "recommended by high medical authorities for the anemic, those suffering from lung diseases, women who have recently given birth, breastfeeding mothers and convalescents of all kinds". The brewery sent Otto von Bismarck a container of Blume des Elsterthales on his birthday and advertised the beer with his praise.

In 1896 the brewery had a capacity of 40,000 hl (1,056,688.2 gallons) and produced 25,000 hl (660,430.13 gallons) of beer annually, of which 12,000 hl (317,006.46 gallons) was black beer.

Between 1906 and 1908 Zersch had a new brick company building erected in Köstritz. After the Second World War, the brewery was nationalized in October 1948 and traded as VEB Köstritzer Schwarzbierbrauerei from November 25 of the same year. In the German Democratic Republic, the Köstritzer brewery was one of the few companies that produced beers for export. The beer was exported to the Federal Republic of Germany from 1956 to 1976, then to all of Eastern Europe until reunification. The brewery was completely rebuilt between 1979 and 1990.

In April 1991, Bitburger Holding took over 100% of the business. From 1991 to 1993, the brewery was extensively modernized. In 1993, the company established "Köstritzer Schwarzbier" as its significant brand on the German market. The brewery increased its total output more than six-fold between 1991 (145,000 hl/ 3,830,494.76 gal) and 2005 (879,000 hl/ 23,220,723.4). To this day, Köstritzer has a 30 percent market share in Germany for dark bottom-fermented beers.

== Present Day ==
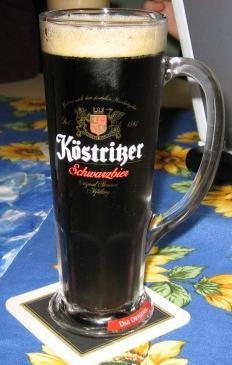
Köstritzer Schwarzbier

Köstritzer produces the following types of beer:

- Schwarzbier (4.8% ABV)
- Kranich-Bräu
- Edel-Pils
- Diät-Pils
- Bibop (a mixture of cola and beer)
- Witbier
- Pale Ale
- Kellerbier

== Notes ==
1. Anna von Sydow (Hrsg.): Wilhelm und Caroline von Humboldt in ihren Briefen: Reife Seelen. Briefe von 1820–1835, Zeller, 1968, S. 183.
2. ↑ Wilhelm von Humboldt im Verkehr mit seinen Freunden im Projekt Gutenberg-DE
3. ↑ Wilhelm von Humboldt: . Jazzybee Verlag, Altenmünster 2012, ISBN 978-3-8496-3865-8, S. 238 (eingeschränkte Vorschau in der Google-Buchsuche [retrieved 20 July 2017]).
4. ↑ ^{Hochspringen nach:a} ^{b} Werbeanzeige in: Veröffentlichungen des Kaiserlichen Gesundheitsamtes. Band 17, J. Springer, 1893, S. 32.
5. ↑ Fritz Regel: Thüringen. Ein geographisches Handbuch, Band 3, Jena 1896, S. 154.
6. ↑ ^{Hochspringen nach:a} ^{b} Dürener Kreiszeitung, 25 July 2011 Wirtschaftsteil, S. 21.
7. ↑ Super-Illu 13 February 2013.
8. ↑ gera.otz.de/Wirtschaft
9. ↑ Heinrich Voß: "Es muss überraschen" – Anforderungen an Biermixe steigen, Getränkefachgrosshandel, 4, 2009, S. 12.
