= Philipp Stolle =

Philipp Stolle (1614 – 4 October 1675) was a German composer, tenor and theorbo player of the Baroque era.

Stolle was born in 1614 at Radeburg. He was a pupil of Caspar Kittel. He worked for many years at the Dresden court of Johann Georg I, Elector of Saxony, while Heinrich Schütz was Kapellmeister there. On 16 January 1649 Stolle married Anna Maria Krätzschmar.

At the request of the Dresden court poet David Schirmer, Stolle produced musical settings for 68 of Schirmer's poems, published in 1654 as the songbook Singende Rosen Oder Liebes-und Tugend-Lieder. The settings were for soprano, theorbo or viola da gamba, and basso continuo. Schirmer also included 51 of the songs from Singende Rosen in his famous 1657 collection Poetische Rosen-Gepüsche.

Eventually Stolle was transferred into a new ensemble at court, under the musical direction of Giovanni Andrea Bontempi. This was set up by the Elector's son, the future Johann Georg II, in response to the chronic decline of his father's Kapelle. However, in 1653, Stolle wrote to Johann Georg II asking to be released, pointing out that after 21 years of service at Dresden, his annual salary of 300 thaler was still not enough for him to provide for his family. By then he and his wife had three children.

In 1654, Stolle finally left Dresden, for the court of Augustus, Duke of Saxe-Weissenfels at Halle, where he succeeded Samuel Scheidt as Kapellmeister. There he seems to have composed a number of Singspiel operas, although only one survives, Charimunda (1658, Halle). In 1660 he yielded the position of Kapellmeister at Halle to David Pohle, but apparently continued composing operas there, and subsequently went on to work at the secundogeniture court at Saxe-Weissenfels. He died at Halle on 4 October 1675.

== Sources ==
- Baron, John H. "Stolle, Philipp". Grove Music Online. Oxford University Press.(subscription required)
- Frandsen, Mary E (2006). Crossing Confessional Boundaries: the Patronage of Italian Sacred Music in 17th Century Dresden. Oxford: Oxford University Press. ISBN 978-0-19-517831-9.
- Harper, Anthony J (2003). German Secular Song-books of the Mid-Seventeenth Century. Aldershot, Hampshire: Ashgate. ISBN 0-7546-0642-2.
- Spagnoli, Gina (1993). "Dresden at the time of Heinrich Schütz". In Price, Curtis (ed.). The Early Baroque Era. Basingstoke, Hampshire: Macmillan. pp. 164–184. ISBN 0-333-51600-1.
