= Anton Colander =

German composer and organist

Anton Colander (1590, Weißenfels – 1621, Dresden) was a German (Electoral Saxon) composer and organist.

He was a childhood friend of Heinrich Schütz, studying law in Leipzig with Schütz's brother Benjamin from 1610.

In 1616 he was appointed to the post of organist at the Dresden court and began taking composition classes with Schütz. He was followed as organist by Johann Klemm, Kaspar Kittel, and Matthias Weckmann.

== Works, editions and recordings ==
- Geistliche Konzerte, 1643

Recordings

- Wie ein Rubin in feinem Golde leuchtet, Concerto
