= Kolander =

Kolander is a surname. Notable people with this surname include:

- Friedrich Kolander (1904–1979), German writer and stage actor
- Rok Kolander (born 1980), Slovenian rower
- Steve Kolander (born 1961), American country music artist
- Vatroslav Kolander (1848–1912), Croatian organist and composer

== See also ==
- Colander (disambiguation)
