= Bad Köstritz =

- Town
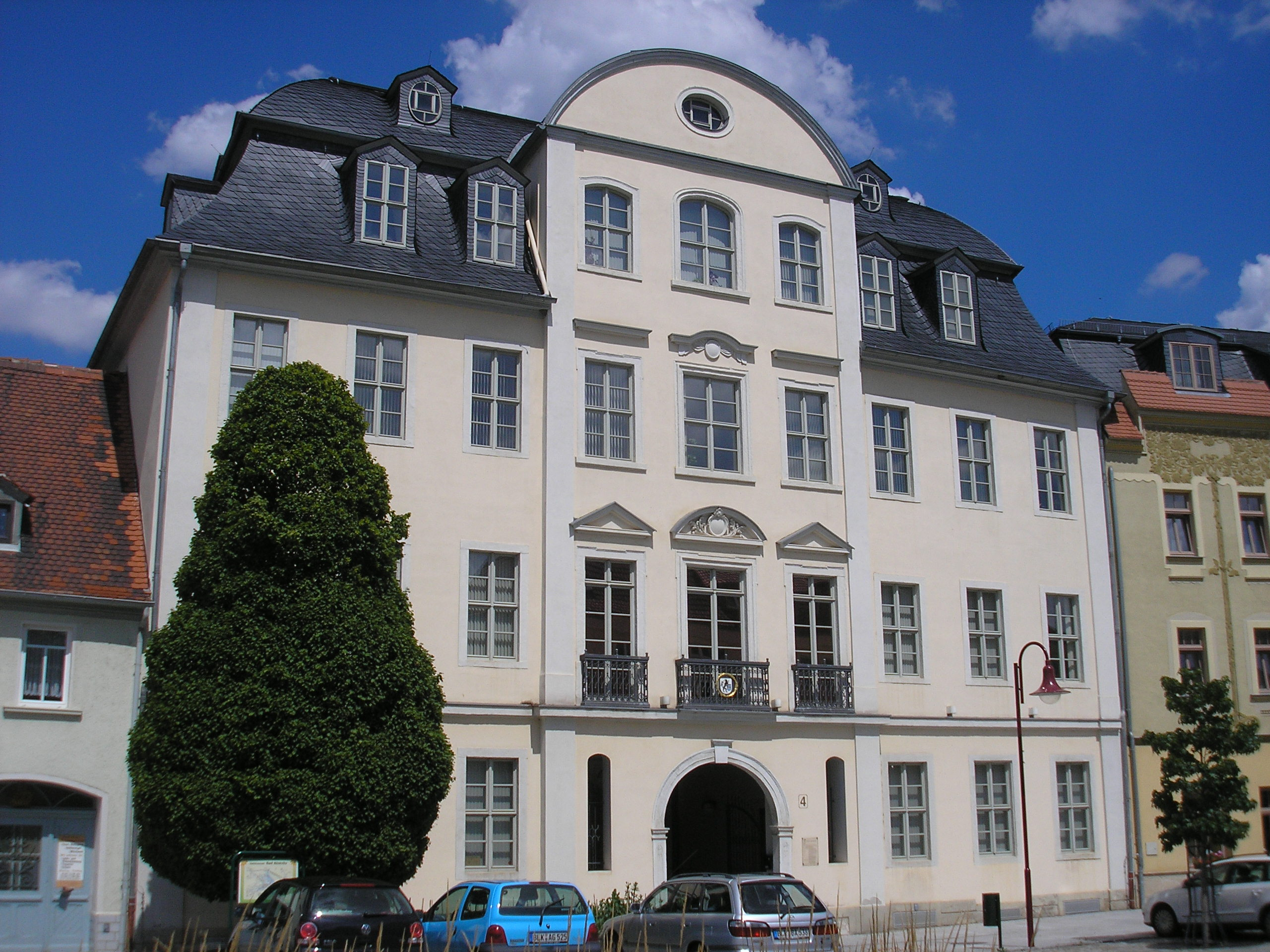
- Palace

- Coat of arms

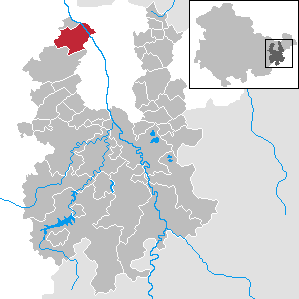
- Location of Bad Köstritz within Greiz district
- Interactive map of Bad Köstritz
- Location within Germany Location within Thuringia
- Coordinates: 50°55′50″N 12°0′35″E
- Country: Germany
- State: Thuringia
- District: Greiz

Government
  - Mayor (2021–27): Oliver Voigt (FW)

Area
  - Total: 20.34 km^{2} (7.85 sq mi)
- Elevation: 203 m (666 ft)

Population (2025-12-31)
  - Total: 3,651
  - Density: 179.5/km^{2} (464.9/sq mi)
- Time zone: UTC+01:00 (CET)
  - Summer (DST): UTC+02:00 (CEST)
- Postal codes: 07586
- Dialling codes: 036605
- Vehicle registration: GRZ
- Website: www.stadt-bad-koestritz.de

Bad Köstritz (German pronunciation: [baːt ˈkœstʁɪts]) is a town in the district of Greiz, in Thuringia, Germany. It is situated on the White Elster river, 7 km northwest of Gera. Bad Köstritz is known for the Köstritzer brewery and its Schwarzbier (black beer).

== History ==
The settlement was first mentioned in 1364 as Kostricz, a place of Slavic foundation. There has been a castle since the middle of the 13th century. The city has emerged from two medieval manors.

Within the German Empire (1871–1918), Köstritz was part of the Principality of Reuss-Gera. Köstritz Castle, a four-winged building around a courtyard built between 1687 and 1704, was the seat of a side wing of the ruling House of Reuss, named counts and (from 1806) princes Reuss-Köstritz. The castle was demolished in 1972 under the government of East Germany, with only the gatehouse left. Today, a modern hotel has been built on the site. In January 2023 Bad Köstritz absorbed the former municipality Hartmannsdorf.

== Local council ==
Election in May 2014:

- CDU: 9 seats
- The Left: 3 seats
- Free voters (FWG): 4 seats

== Sights ==
- Heinrich Schütz House
- Municipal park

== Sons and daughters of the town ==
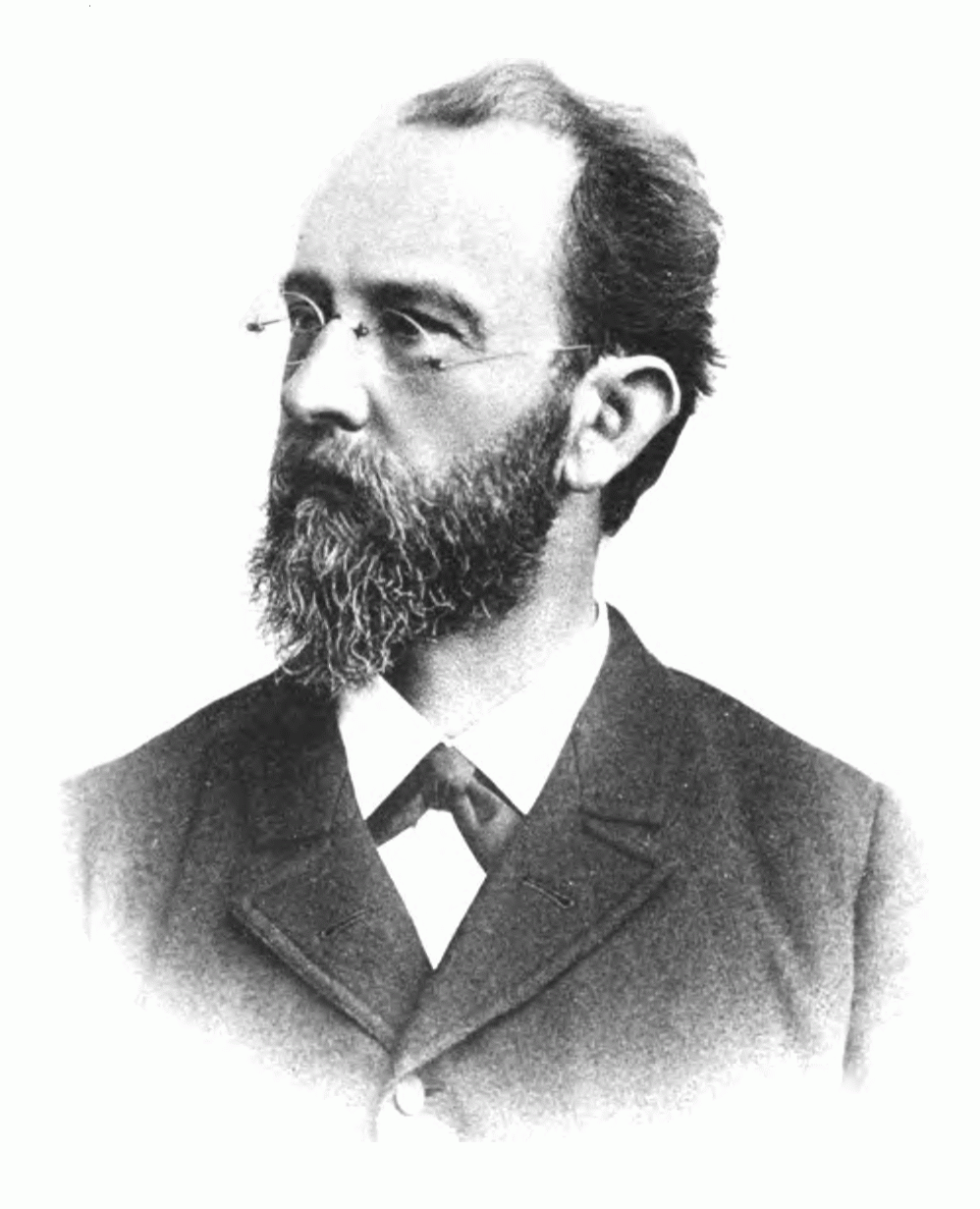
Gustav von Hüfner

- Heinrich Schütz (1585–1672), German composer of the early Baroque
- Heinrich IX, Count Reuss of Köstritz (1711–1780), founder of the middle branch family Reuss-Köstritz
- Julius Sturm (1816–1896), important German poet of late Romanticism, pastor in Köstritz 1856–1885, honorary citizen of Köstritz 1885
- Gustav von Hüfner (1840–1908), German chemist
- Heinrich Sturm (1860–1917), German jurist, politician and from 1908 to 1917 mayor of Chemnitz
