= Heinrich Schütz =

German composer and organist (1585–1672)

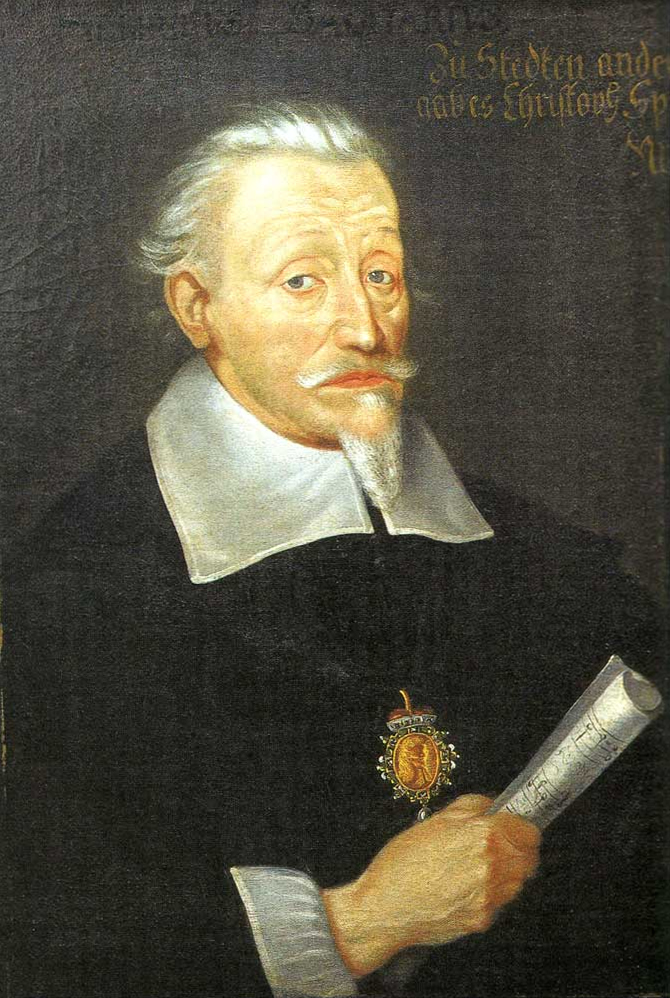
- Heinrich Schütz by Christoph Spätner, c. 1660 (Museum of Musical Instruments of Leipzig University)
- Born: 18 October [O.S. 8 October] 1585; Köstritz, Lordship of Reuss-Gera, Holy Roman Empire
- Died: 6 November 1672 (aged 87); Dresden, Electorate of Saxony, Holy Roman Empire
- Works: List of compositions

Heinrich Schütz (German: [ʃʏt͡s]; 18 October [O.S. 8 October] 1585 – 6 November 1672) was a German early Baroque composer and organist, generally regarded as the most important German composer before Johann Sebastian Bach and one of the most important composers of the 17th century. He is credited with bringing the Italian style to Germany and continuing its evolution from the Renaissance into the early Baroque. Most of his surviving music was written for the Lutheran church, primarily for the Electoral Chapel in Dresden. He wrote what is traditionally considered the first German opera, Dafne, performed at Torgau in 1627, the music of which has since been lost, along with nearly all of his ceremonial and theatrical scores. Schütz was a prolific composer, with more than 500 surviving works.

He is commemorated as a musician in the Calendar of Saints of some North American Lutheran churches on 28 July with Johann Sebastian Bach and George Frideric Handel.

== Early life and education ==
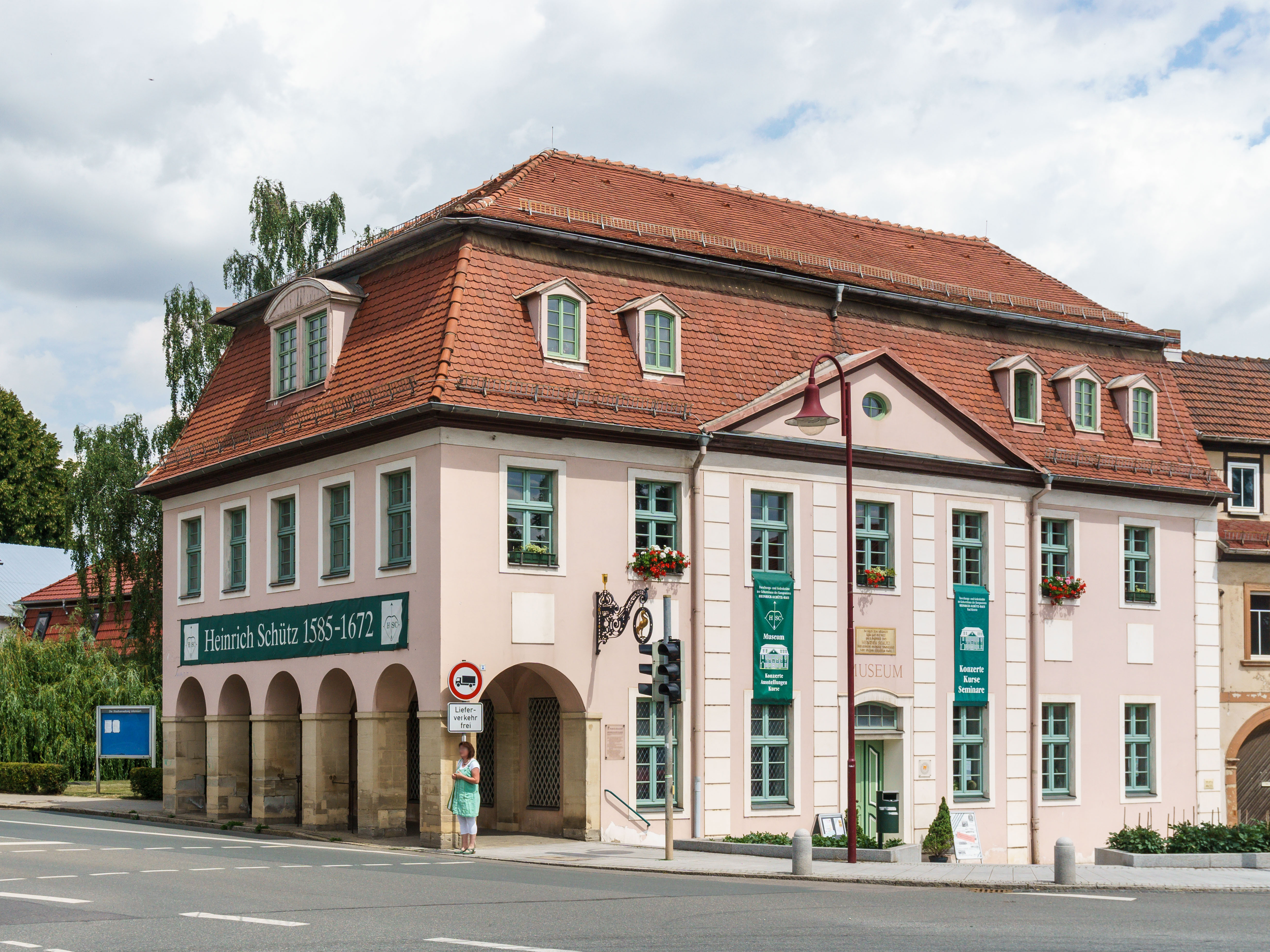
Heinrich Schütz House, the composer's birthplace in Bad Köstritz, now a museum

Schütz was born in Köstritz, the eldest son of Christoph Schütz and Euphrosyne Bieger.

In 1590 the family moved to Weißenfels, where his father managed the inn "Zum güldenen Ring". His father eventually served as burgomaster in Weißenfels, and in 1615 purchased another inn known as both "Zur güldenen Sackpfeife" and "Zum güldenen Esel", which he renamed "Zum Schützen".

While Schütz was living with his parents, his musical talents were discovered by Landgrave Moritz von Hessen-Kassel in 1598 during an overnight stay in Christoph Schütz's inn. Upon hearing young Heinrich sing, the landgrave requested that his parents allow the boy to be sent to his noble court for further education and instruction. His parents initially resisted the offer, but after much correspondence they took Heinrich to the landgrave's seat at Kassel in August 1599.

After being a choirboy, Schütz studied law at Marburg before going to Venice from 1609 to 1612 to study music with Giovanni Gabrieli. Gabrieli is the only person Schütz ever called his teacher. He inherited a ring from Gabrieli shortly before the latter's death. He was subsequently organist at Kassel from 1613 to 1615.

== Career ==
After a prolonged negotiation between the landgrave and the elector, Schütz moved to Dresden in 1615 to work as court composer to the Elector of Saxony. In 1619 Schütz married Magdalena Wildeck (born 1601). She bore two daughters before her death in 1625: Anna Justina in 1621 and Euphrosyne in 1623.

In Dresden Schütz sowed the seeds of what is now the Sächsische Staatskapelle Dresden, but left there on several occasions; in 1628 he went to Venice again, where he may have met Claudio Monteverdi. In 1633 he was invited to Copenhagen to compose the music for wedding festivities there, returning to Dresden in 1635. He again conducted an extended visit to Denmark in 1641, due to the devastation of the Electoral court. The Thirty Years' War ended in 1648, and he again became more active in Dresden. In 1655, the year his daughter Euphrosyne died, he accepted an ex officio post as Kapellmeister at Wolfenbüttel.

Schütz's Dresden compositions during the Thirty Years' War were, by necessity of the times, smaller-scale than the often massive earlier works; this period produced much of his most charming music. After the war, Schütz again wrote larger-scale compositions culminating in the 1660s, when he composed the greatest Passionmusic before Bach.

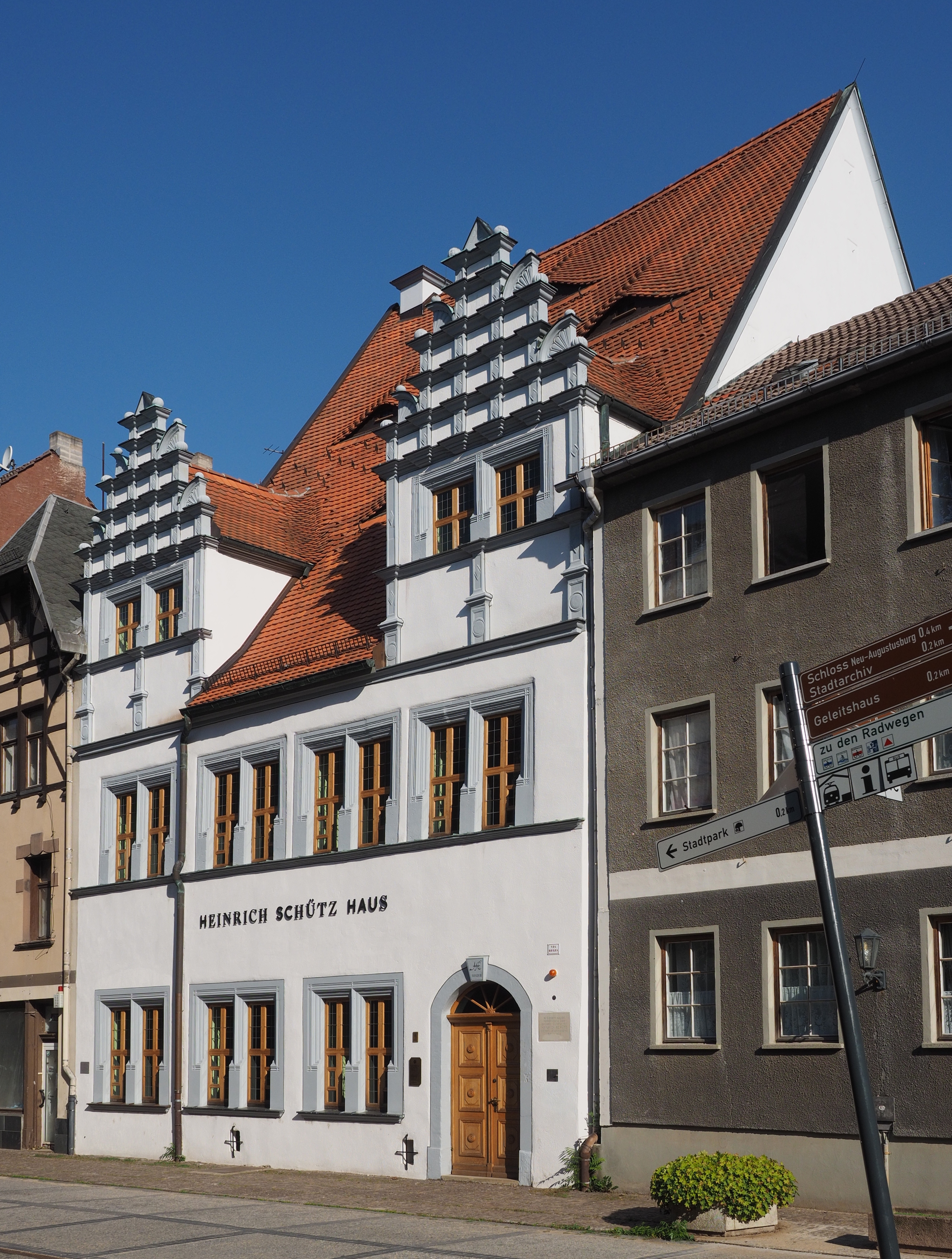
Heinrich Schütz House, the composer's home in Weißenfels, now a museum.

His pupils included Heinrich Albert, Christoph Bernhard, Anton Colander, Constantin Christian Dedekind, Carlo Farina, Johann Wilhelm Furchheim, Johann Kaspar Horn, Caspar Kittel, Christoph Kittel, Johann Klemm, Adam Krieger, Johann Jakob Loewe (or Löwe), Johann Nauwach, David Pohle, Philipp Stolle, Johann Theile, Clemens Thieme, Johann Vierdanck, Matthias Weckmann, Friedrich Werner, and Friedrich von Westhoff. (See: List of music students by teacher: R to S#Heinrich Schutz.)

== Later life ==
Schütz moved back to Weißenfels, in a retirement he had to beg for, to live with his sister (the house is now a museum of his life), but the Electoral Court often called him back to Dresden. He died in Dresden of a stroke in 1672 at age 87. He was buried in the old Dresden Frauenkirche, but his tomb was destroyed in 1727 when the church was torn down to build the new Dresden Frauenkirche. (His longtime house on the same square has been reconstructed in the same style and is an apartment building with hotel rooms and a restaurant.)

== Style ==
Schütz's compositions show the influence of Gabrieli (most notably in Schütz's use of polychoral and concertato styles) and Monteverdi. The influence of the Netherlandish composers of the 16th century is also prominent in his work. His best-known works are sacred, ranging from solo voice with instrumental accompaniment to a cappella choral music. Representative works include his Psalmen Davids (Psalms of David, Opus 2), Cantiones sacrae (Opus 4), three books of Symphoniae sacrae, Die sieben Worte Jesu Christi am Kreuz (The seven words of Jesus Christ on the Cross), three Passion settings, and the Christmas Story. Schütz's music, while in the most progressive styles early in his career, eventually grew simple and almost austere, culminating in his late Passion settings. Practical considerations were certainly responsible for part of this change: the Thirty Years' War devastated Germany's musical infrastructure, and it was no longer practical or even possible to put on the gigantic works in the Venetian style of his earlier period.

Schütz's composition "Es steh Gott auf" (SWV 356) is in many respects comparable to Monteverdi. His funeral music "Musikalische Exequien" (1636) for his noble friend Heinrich Posthumus of Reuss is considered a masterpiece, and is known today as the first German Requiem. Schütz was equally fluent in Latin and Germanic styles.

Schütz was one of the last composers to write in a modal style. His harmonies often result from the contrapuntal alignment of voices rather than from any sense of "harmonic motion"; contrastingly, much of his music shows a strong tonal pull when approaching cadences. His music includes a great deal of imitation, but structured in such a way that the successive voices do not necessarily enter after the same number of beats or at predictable intervallic distances. This contrasts sharply with the manner of his contemporary Johann Hermann Schein and Samuel Scheidt, whose counterpoint usually flows in regularly spaced entries. Schütz's writing often includes intense dissonances caused by the contrapuntal motion of voices moving in correct individual linear motion but resulting in startling harmonies. Above all, his music displays extreme sensitivity to the accents and meaning of the text, which is often conveyed using special technical figures drawn from musica poetica, themselves drawn from or created in analogy to the verbal figures of classical rhetoric. As noted above, Schütz's style became simpler in his later works, which make less frequent use of the kind of distantly related chords and licences found in such pieces as "Was hast du verwirket" (SWV 307) from Kleine geistliche Konzerte II.

Beyond the early book of madrigals, almost no secular music by Schütz has survived, save for a few domestic songs (arien) and occasional commemorative items (such as Wie wenn der Adler sich aus seiner Klippe schwingt (SWV 434), and no purely instrumental music at all (unless one counts the short instrumental movement, "sinfonia", that encloses the dialogue of Die sieben Worte), even though he had a reputation as one of Germany's finest organists.

Schütz was of great importance in bringing new musical ideas to Germany from Italy, and thus had a large influence on the German music which was to follow. After Bach, the most important composers Schütz influenced were Anton Webern and Brahms, who studied his work.

== Works ==
Rembrandt: Man with a Sheet of Music, 1633 (National Gallery of Art, Washington, D.C., 2014.136.41; formerly in the Corcoran Gallery of Art, William A. Clark Collection). Scholars regard it as inauthentic and not portraying Heinrich Schütz.

The following are major published works; most of these contain multiple pieces of music; single published works are also listed in the complete work list, including major works such as the Seven Last Words, and the Passions (according to Matthew, Luke, and John). Over 500 individual pieces by Schütz survive.

- Il primo libro de madrigali (first book of madrigals) (opus 1, Venice, 1611)
- Psalmen Davids (Book 1) (opus 2, Dresden, 1619)
- Historia der ... Aufferstehung ... (The Resurrection) (opus 3, Dresden, 1623)
- Cantiones sacrae (opus 4, Freiberg, 1625)
- Becker Psalter (opus 5, Freiberg, 1628, revised 1661)
- Symphoniae sacrae (Book 1) (opus 6, Venice, 1629)
- Musikalische Exequien (opus 7, Dresden, 1636)
- Kleine geistliche Konzerte (Book 1) (opus 8, Leipzig, 1636)
- Kleine geistliche Konzerte (Book 2) (opus 9, Leipzig, 1639)
- Symphoniae sacrae (Book 2) (opus 10, Dresden, 1647)
- Geistliche Chormusik (opus 11, Dresden, 1648)
- Symphoniae sacrae (Book 3) (opus 12, Dresden, 1650)
- Zwölf geistliche Gesänge (opus 13, Dresden, 1657)
- Historia der ... Geburt ... Jesu Christi (Christmas Story; Dresden, 1664)
- Lukas-Passion (The Passion According to St. Luke) (Dresden, 1665)
- Johannes-Passion (The Passion According to St. John) (Dresden, 1666)
- Matthäus-Passion (The Passion According to St. Matthew) (Dresden, 1666)
- Königs und Propheten 119er Psalm ... (Psalm 119, Psalm 100, and German Magnificat: Der Schwanengesang, "Swan Song") (opus ultimum, Dresden, 1671)

== General sources ==
- Manfred Bukofzer, Music in the Baroque Era. New York, W.W. Norton & Co., 1947. ISBN 0-393-09745-5
- Wolfram Steude, "Zum gegenwärtigen Stand der Schütz-Ikonographie," in Schütz-Jahrbuch 1986/87. Kassel, Bärenreiter, 1986, pp. 50–61. ISBN 3-7618-0778-3
- Basil Smallman, Heinrich Schütz, The Master Musicians, 2000.
- Tamsin (née T.D.) Jones, Passions in Perspective: An Analytical Discussion of the Three Passions of Heinrich Schütz (1585–1672) Against Their Historical and Stylistic Backgrounds (PhD thesis, University of Birmingham, 2000)
- Heinrich Schütz: Geistliche Chor-Music, Op. 11. Edited by Andrew Thomas Kuster. Ann Arbor, MI, 2005. ISBN 1-4116-4243-0.
- Bettina Varwig, Histories of Heinrich Schütz, Cambridge University Press, 2011. ISBN 978-0-521-19765-6
