= Schwarzbier =

Dark German lager

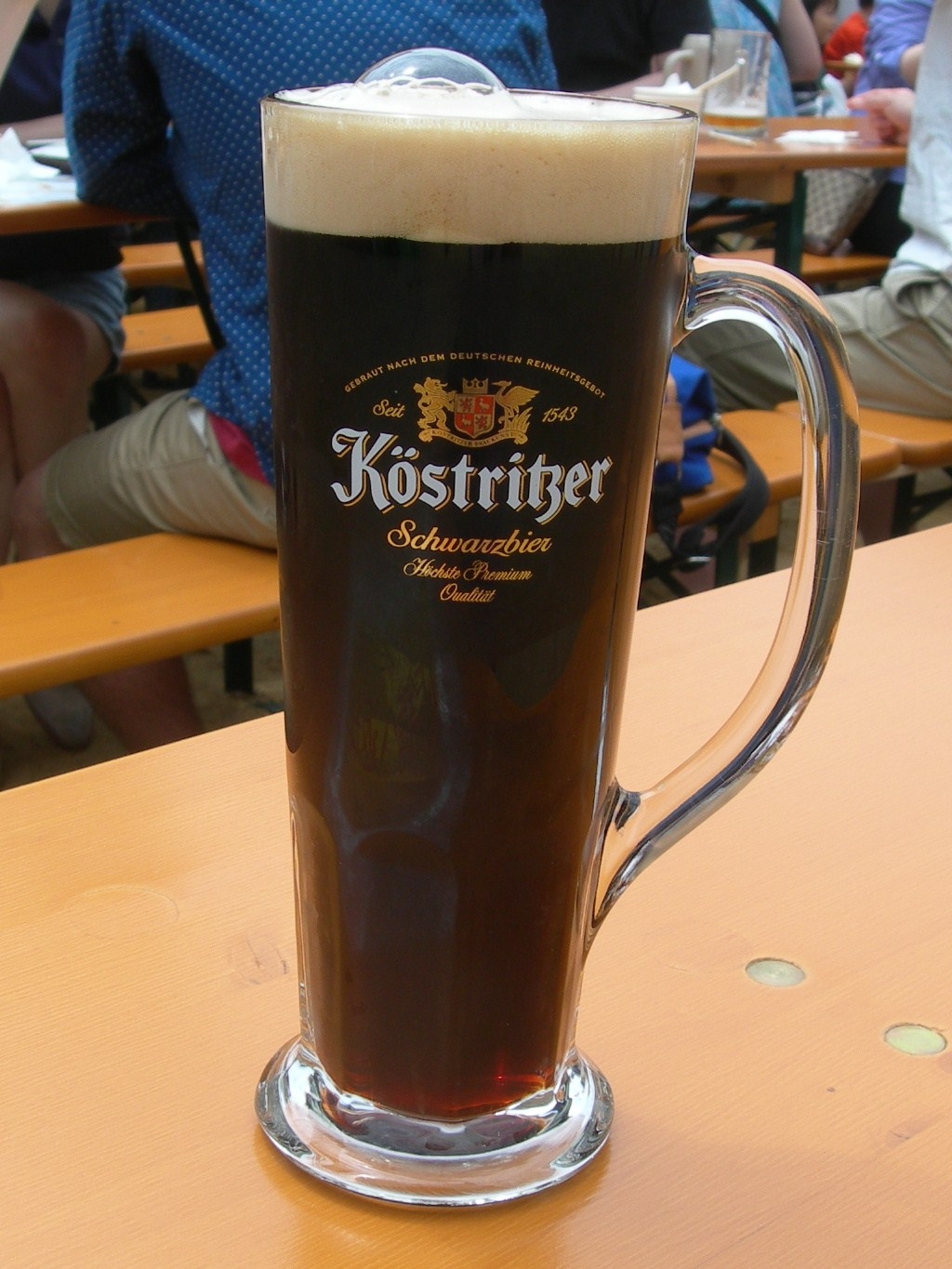
Köstritzer Schwarzbier

Schwarzbier (German: [ˈʃvaʁt͡sˌbiːɐ̯] lit. 'black beer') is a dark lager that originated in Germany. It has an opaque, black colour with hints of chocolate or coffee flavours, and is generally around 5% ABV. It is similar to stout in that it is made from roasted malt, which gives it its dark colour.

== Characteristics ==
Schwarzbiers are made using a cool fermentation method, which classes them as lager, though historically warm fermentation was used. The alcohol content usually ranges from 4.4% to 5.4%. They get their dark colour from the use of particularly dark malts or roast malt extract in brewing. The malt, in turn, gets its colour during the roasting procedure. Its flavour may vary between bitter and slightly sweet.

== History ==
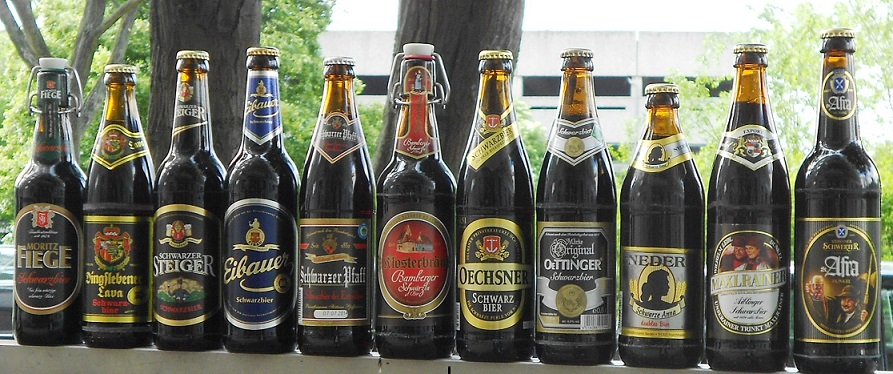
German Schwarzbier

The roots of Schwarzbier lie in Thuringia and Saxony. The oldest known black beer is Braunschweiger Mumme ("Brunswick Mum"), brewed since the Middle Ages; the first documented mention is from 1390 in Braunschweig. The earliest documented mention in Thuringia is of Köstritzer brewery from 1543, a brewery which later started producing Schwarzbier and still produces it today. Present-day eastern Germany has many unique varieties of this style from regional breweries.

== Examples ==
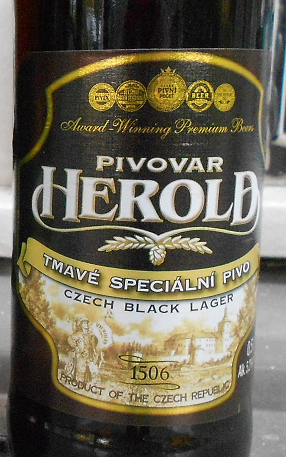
Czech Black Lager

Modern Schwarzbiers include Köstritzer, Sprecher Black Bavarian, Red Hawk Brewing Schwarzbier,Samuel Adams Black Lager, New Belgium 1554 Black Lager, Shiner Black, and Xingu Black.

Dark Czech lagers range from dark to black beers (Czech tmavé and černé).
