= Hartmannsdorf, Greiz =

Hartmannsdorf
- Ortsteil of Bad Köstritz
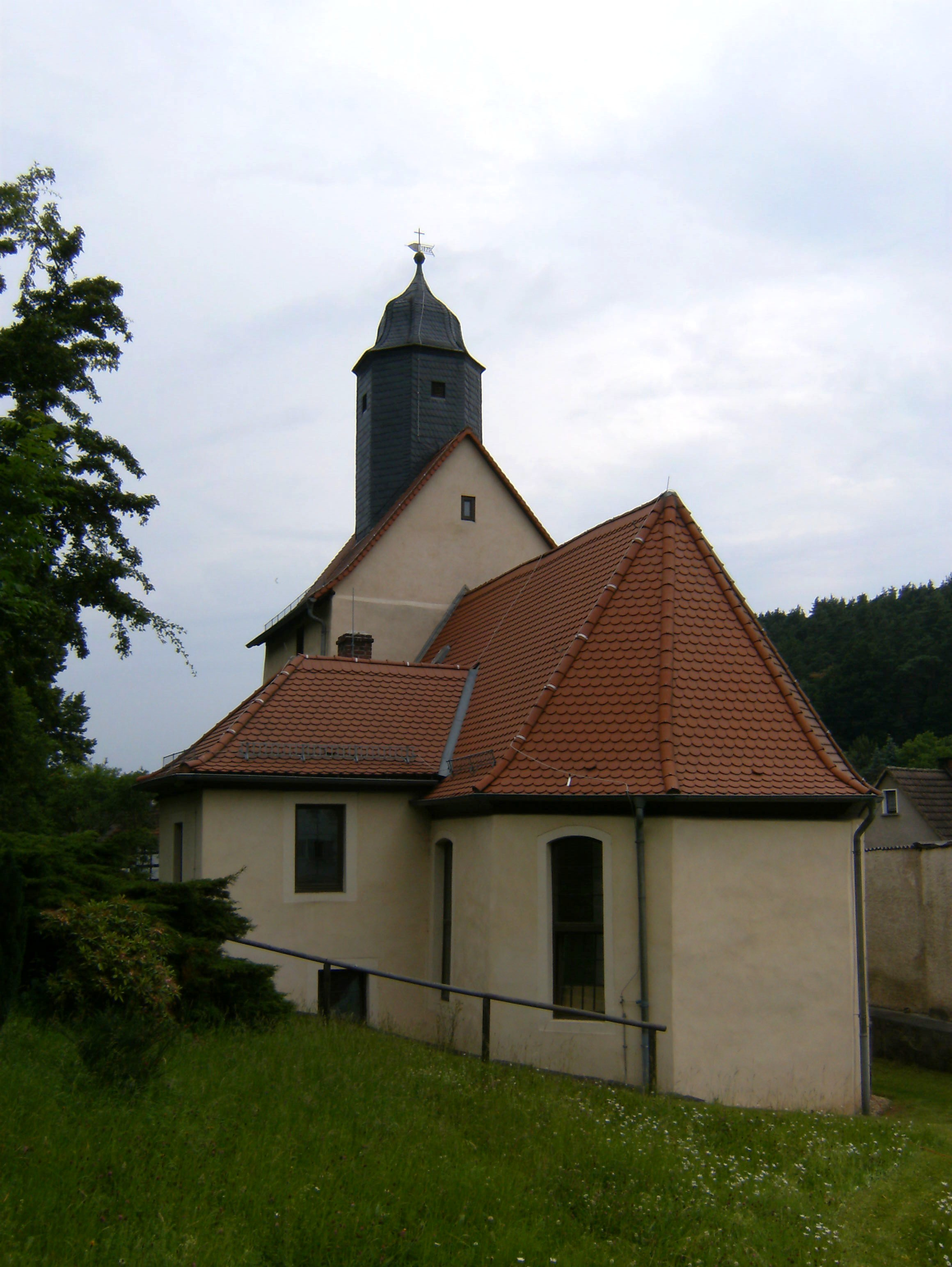
- Church in Hartmannsdorf
- Interactive map of Hartmannsdorf
- Location within Germany Location within Thuringia
- Coordinates: 50°54′37″N 12°0′15″E
- Country: Germany
- State: Thuringia
- District: Greiz
- Town: Bad Köstritz

Area
  - Total: 3.41 km^{2} (1.32 sq mi)
- Elevation: 225 m (738 ft)

Population (2021-12-31)
  - Total: 334
  - Density: 97.9/km^{2} (254/sq mi)
- Time zone: UTC+01:00 (CET)
  - Summer (DST): UTC+02:00 (CEST)
- Postal codes: 07586
- Dialling codes: 036605

Hartmannsdorf (German pronunciation: [ˈhaʁtmansdɔʁf]) is a village and a former municipality in the district of Greiz, in Thuringia, Germany. On 1 January 2023 it became part of the town Bad Köstritz.
