= Johann Kaspar Horn =

German composer, physician and musician

Johann Caspar Horn or Kaspar (fl. 1640s) was a German composer, physician and musician. At Dresden he was connected with Heinrich Schütz.

== Works, editions and recordings ==
- Geistliche Harmonien, Wintertheil (Dresden, 1680)
- Geistliche Harmonien, Sommertheil (Dresden, 1681)
- Parergon musicum, oder Musicalisches Neben-Werck (Leipzig. 1663–76)
