= Heinrich Schütz House, Bad Köstritz =

Museum in Germany

Heinrich Schütz House.
- Heinrich-Schütz-Haus
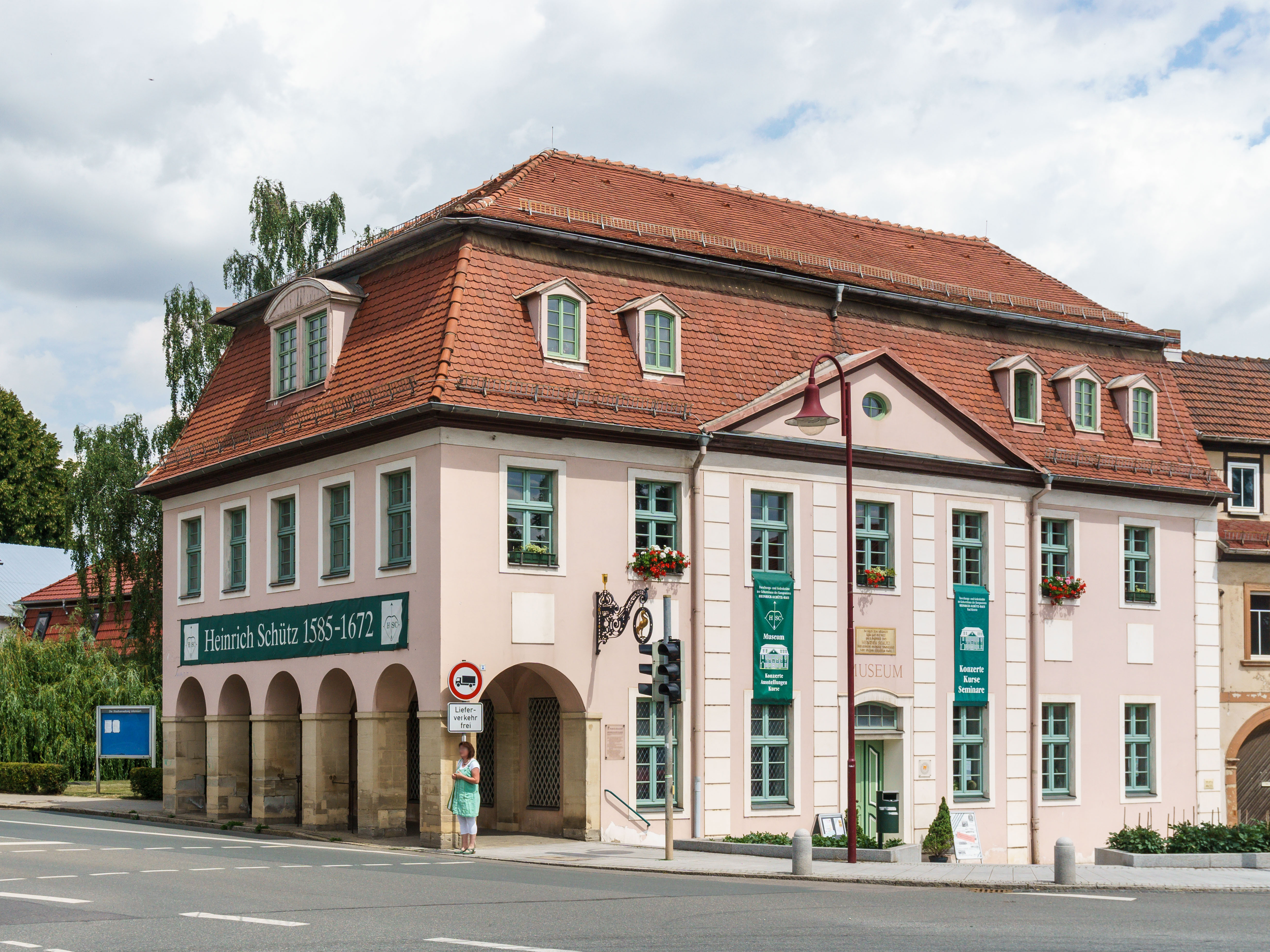
- The house in 2016

General information
- Address: Heinrich-Schütz-Straße 1; 07586 Bad Köstritz
- Country: Germany
- Coordinates: 50°55′49″N 12°0′40″E

Website
- http://www.heinrich-schuetz-haus.de/

Heinrich Schütz House is a cultural site in Bad Köstritz, in Thuringia, Germany. The composer Heinrich Schütz (1585–1672) was born here; the house is now a museum about his life and work.

== History ==
The earliest mention of the building is in 1505. Albrecht Schütz, the composer's grandfather, was named as innkeeper in 1545, and in 1572 Christoph Schütz, the composer's father, took over the inn.

In 1583 Christoph Schütz married Euphrosine Bieger, the daughter of the mayor of Gera; it was his third marriage. Heinrich Schütz, their second child, was born on 8 October 1585. In 1591 the family moved to Weißenfels, and Christoph's brother Andreas took over the inn. The composer's later home in the town, the Heinrich Schütz House in Weißenfels, is now a museum.

In 1931 a memorial plaque was unveiled by the Heinrich Schütz Committee of Bad Köstritz. In 1952 the outbuildings and part of the inn were demolished when a new road was built; in the remaining part, a small memorial about the composer was created for the first time in 1954.

In 1985, the 400th anniversary of the composer's birth, the building was transformed into the Forschungs- und Gedenkstätte Heinrich Schütz Haus Bad Köstritz – "the research and memorial place, the Heinrich Schütz House at Bad Köstritz". It opened on 15 October 1985. The house was renovated in 2000.

== Exhibitions and events ==
There is a permanent exhibition about the life and cultural background of the composer, regarded as the first German composer of international importance. The house is a venue of the regional annual Heinrich Schütz Music Festival, which began as Köstritzer Schütz Tage (Köstritz Schütz Days). It offers concerts, seminars, courses in early music, and temporary exhibitions in the museum.
