= Caspar Kittel =

German Baroque theorbist and composer (1603 - 1639)

Caspar Kittel (1603 in Lauenstein–October 9, 1639 in Dresden) was a German Baroque theorbist and composer at the Dresden Hofkapelle. He was a pupil, then colleague of Heinrich Schütz, and preceded Schütz on the Kapellmeister's second sojourn in Italy from 1624. His brother was Christoph Kittel. His music was heavily influenced by the poetry of Martin Opitz.

== Works, editions and recordings ==
- Arien und Kantaten, Dresden, 1648
- Jordan und Jaffe, Berlin, 1649
