= Christoph Kittel =

German organist and music publisher

Christoph Kittel (born around 1620 - died Dresden, 1680, of the pest) was a German organist, music publisher. He was son of Kaspar Kittel, baptized at Lauenstein in 1603, died on 9 Dec. 1939 in Dresden, who had become a member of the Dresden Court orchestra on 23 Sept. 1616. The Saxon Elector sent him to Venice from 1624 - to 1629 to study singing and playing the orb. When back in Dresden, he was promoted to court organist. With the publication of his "Arien und Cantaten" (texts by Opitz), Kaspar Kittel became the first German composer to use the Italian terms 'aria and cantata', by which he meant strophic variations. His son Christoph (born 1620 or a little later, died of the pest in 1680) was appointed to the Dresden Hofkapelle as player of the lute. Like his father Kaspar Kittel Christoph was a pupil of Heinrich Schütz; Christoph published the "Zwölff geistlichen Konzerte" of Schütz in 1657" (SWV 420-31). Christoph only had two children: Anna Maria Kittel (Dresden 7.8.1648 - 6.9.1680 Colditz), buried on 7. Sept., married in 1674 Magister Martin Haugk, rector of the Colditz school. Her brother Johann Kittel, Christoph's only son (13.10.1652 - 17.7.1682 Dresden, GND 131664816) became second organist at the Dresden Court chapel; he seems not to have married and children have not been found so far.
